= List of hospitals in India =

This is a list of notable hospitals in India.

Various medical colleges and medicine related educational institutes also serve as hospitals. For those, refer to List of medical colleges in India. For a list of psychiatric hospitals and nursing homes in India refer to List of psychiatric hospitals in India.

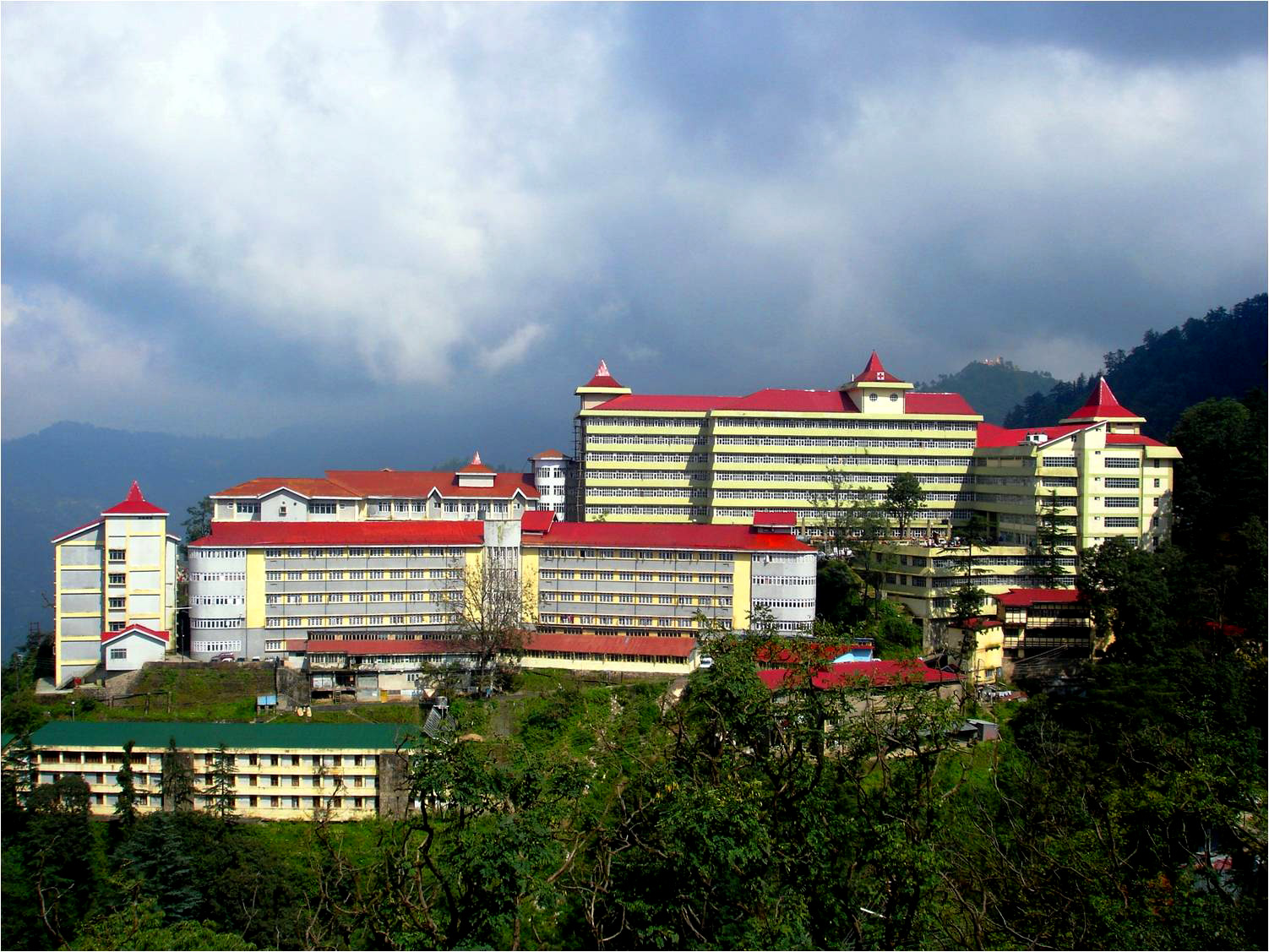
Indira Gandhi Medical College and Hospital, Shimla, India

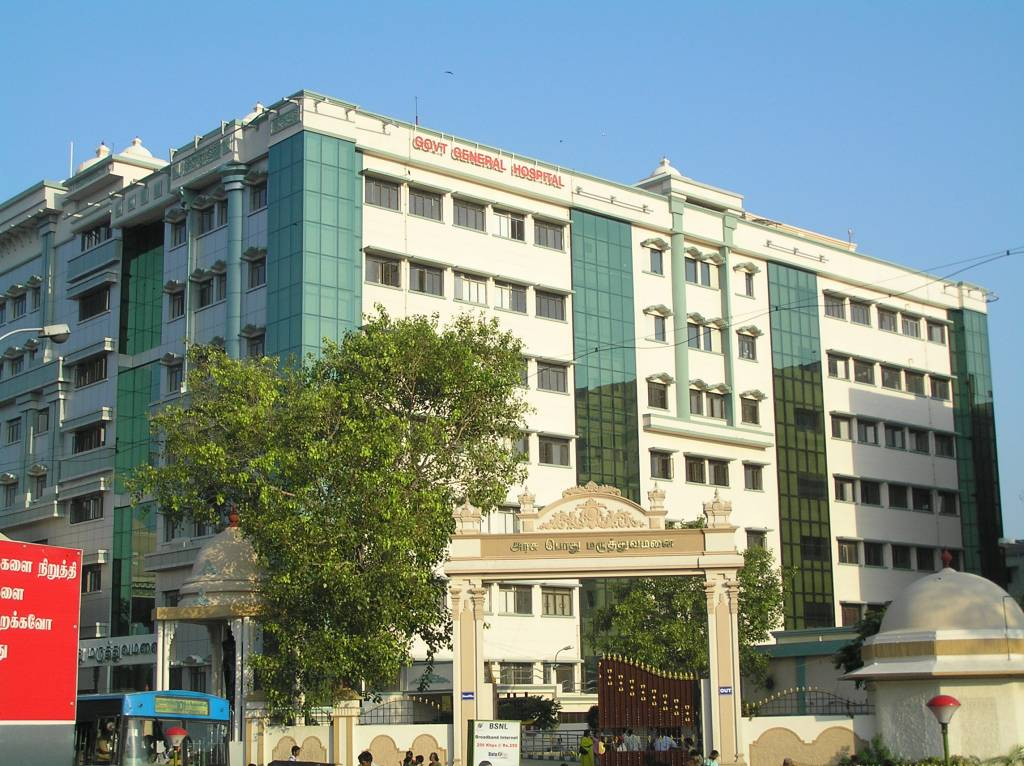
Opened in 1664, Rajiv Gandhi Government General Hospital, Chennai is the first medical institution in the country.

== Chain hospitals ==
Various chain or network hospitals operate in various cities of India. These are:

- Apollo Hospitals
- Asian Institute of Medical Sciences
- Aster DM Healthcare
- Billroth Hospitals
- Baby Memorial Hospital
- Care Hospitals
- Command Hospital
- Council of Christian Hospitals
- Devadoss Hospital
- Dr. Agarwal's Eye Hospital
- Dr. Mehta's Hospitals
- Dr. Mohan's Diabetes Specialities Centre
- Fortis Healthcare
- Gleneagles Global Hospitals
- Hinduja Healthcare Limited
- Kailash Group of Hospitals
- Krishna Institute of Medical Sciences
- L. V. Prasad Eye Institutes
- LifeSpring Hospitals
- Manipal Hospitals
- Medanta Hospitals
- Max Healthcare
- Medicover Hospitals
- Metro Group of Hospitals
- Narayana Health
- Paras Healthcare
- Rainbow Hospitals
- Regional Cancer Centre
- Sahyadri Hospital
- Shalby Hospital
- Sir Jamshetjee Jeejebhoy Group of Hospitals
- Sterling Hospitals
- Wockhardt Hospitals
- Yatharth Hospitals

== Andhra Pradesh ==
=== Anantapuram ===
- Sri Sathya Sai Institute of Higher Medical Sciences, Puttaparthi

=== Tirupati ===
- Sri Venkateswara Institute of Medical Sciences (SVIMS)

=== Vijayawada ===
- Dr. Mohan’s Diabetes Specialities Centre
- Krishna Institute of Medical Sciences
- L. V. Prasad Eye Institute
- Manipal Hospital
- Rainbow Hospital
- Siddhartha Medical College, Dr. NTR University of Health Sciences

=== Visakhapatnam ===
- Apollo Hospitals, Visakhapatnam
- Care Hospital
- Dr. Agarwal's Eye Hospital
- Government ENT Hospital, Visakhapatnam
- Government Regional Eye Hospital
- Government TB and Chest Hospital, Visakhapatnam
- Government Victoria Hospital
- Homi Bhabha Cancer Hospital & Research Centre
- King George Hospital
- Krishna Institute of Medical Sciences
- L. V. Prasad Eye Institute
- Medicover Hospital
- Rainbow Hospital
- Rani Chandramani Devi Government Hospital
- SevenHills Hospital
- Visakha Institute of Medical Sciences

== Assam ==
=== Guwahati ===
- All India Institute of Medical Sciences, Guwahati
- Apollo Hospitals
- Gauhati Medical College and Hospital
- GNRC
- Narayana Superspeciality Hospital

=== Dibrugarh ===
- Assam Medical College

=== Silchar ===
- SMCH – Silchar Medical College and Hospital
- CCHRC - Cachar Cancer Hospital and Research Centre

=== Jorhat ===
- Jorhat Medical College and Hospital
- Medical Institute Jorhat

=== Tezpur ===
- Lokopriya Gopinath Bordoloi Regional Institute of Mental Health
- Tezpur Medical College and Hospital

=== Diphu ===
- Diphu Medical College and Hospital

=== Barpeta ===
- Fakhruddin Ali Ahmed Medical College and Hospital

== Bihar ==
=== Bhagalpur ===
- Jawaharlal Nehru Medical College and Hospital

=== Darbhanga ===
- All India Institute of Medical Sciences, Darbhanga
- Darbhanga Medical College and Hospital
- Mithila Minority Dental College and Hospital

=== Gaya ===
- Anugrah Narayan Magadh Medical College and Hospital

=== Katihar ===
- Katihar Medical College

=== Muzaffarpur ===
- Sri Krishna Medical College

=== Patna ===
- AIIMS Patna
- Ford Hospital and Research Centre
- Medanta Hospital
- Guru Gobind Singh Hospital, Patna Sahib
- Indira Gandhi Institute of Medical Sciences (IGIMS)
- Nalanda Medical College Hospital, Kankarbagh
- Patna Medical College Hospital, Ashok Raj Patna

=== Sasaram ===
- Narayan Medical College and Hospital

== Chandigarh ==
- Post Graduate Institute of Medical Education and Research, Sector 12

== Chhattisgarh ==
=== Raipur ===
- All India Institute of Medical Sciences, Raipur
- Dr. B.R. Ambedkar Memorial Hospital
- MMI Narayana Multispeciality Hospital

=== Durg-Bhilai ===
- CCM Medical College & CCMGMC Memorial Hospital

=== Bilaspur ===
- CIMS Hospital, Bilaspur (C.G.)

== Delhi ==
Name	Type	Managed by	Location
Charak Palika Hospital	Public	New Delhi Municipal Council	Moti Bagh
Dharamshila Narayana Superspeciality Hospital	Private	Narayana Health	Vasundhara Enclave
Dr. Ram Manohar Lohia Hospital	Public	Government of India	Connaught Place
Guru Teg Bahadur Hospital	Public	Government of NCT of Delhi	Dilshad Garden
Indraprastha Apollo Hospital	Private	Apollo Hospitals	Jasola Vihar
Lok Nayak Hospital	Public	Government of NCT of Delhi	Jawaharlal Nehru Marg
Maharaja Agrasen Hospital	Private	Maharaja Agrasen Hospital Charitable Trust	Punjabi Bagh
Max Med Centre & Institute of Cancer Care	Private	Max Healthcare	Lajpat Nagar
Rajiv Gandhi Cancer Institute and Research Centre	Private	Indraprastha Cancer Society and Research Centre	Niti Bagh & Rohini
Safdarjung Hospital	Public	Government of India	Ansari Nagar West
Sanjeevan Hospital	Private		Daryaganj
Sir Ganga Ram Hospital	Private		Rajinder Nagar
St. Stephen's Hospital	Private		Tis Hazari
Dr. Rupali's Abortion Hospital	Private	Dr. Rupali Mishra	Pul Pehladpur

== Gujarat ==
=== Ahmedabad ===
- Ahmedabad Civil Hospital
- B.J. Medical College, Asarwa
- Dr. Agarwal's Eye Hospital
- GCRI, Ahmedabad
- GMERS Medical College and Hospital, Ahmedabad
- Shalby Hospital

=== Amreli ===
- Shantabaa Medical College Hospital, Amreli

=== Bhavnagar ===
- Government Medical College Hospital Bhavnagar

=== Gandhinagar ===
- GMERS Medical College and Hospital, Gandhinagar

=== Jamnagar ===
- Irwin Group of Hospitals renamed as Guru Gobind Singh Hospital at M. P. Shah Medical College

=== Junagadh ===
- GMERS Medical College and Hospital, Junagadh

=== Rajkot ===
- All India Institute of Medical Sciences, Rajkot & Pandit Deendayal Upadhyay Medical College Hospital, Rajkot
- Shalby Hospital

=== Vadodara ===
- Baroda Medical College Hospitals at M S University
- GMERS Medical College and Hospital, Vadodara
- Metro Hospital & Research Institute

=== Surat ===
- Smimer Hospital

=== Nadiad ===
- Muljibhai Patel Urological Hospital

=== Vapi ===
- Shalby Hospital

== Haryana ==
=== Ambala ===
- Meditrina Hospital

=== Faridabad ===
- Asian Institute of Medical Sciences
- Fortis Escorts Hospital
- Metro Hospital
- Meditrina Hospital

=== Gurugram ===
- Fortis Memorial Research Institute
- Manipal Hospital (formerly known as Columbia Asia)
- Max Hospital
- Medanta - The Medicity
- Meditrina Hospital
- Motherhood Hospital
- Narayana Superspeciality Hospital
- Sukoon Health, Sector 56
- Paras Hospital

=== Hisar ===
- Ganga Ram Hospital

=== Panchkula ===
- Paras Hospital
- Meditrina Hospital

=== Panipat ===
- Navdeep Hospital
- NC Medical College and Hospital

== Himachal Pradesh ==
=== Shimla ===
- Deendayal Upadhyaya Hospital, Shimla (Ripon Hospital)
- Indira Gandhi Medical College and Hospital, Shimla (Snowdown Hospital)

=== Others ===
- All India Institute of Medical Sciences, Bilaspur
- Dr. Rajendra Prasad Government Medical College Kangra
- Shri Lal Bahadur Shastri Government Medical College and Hospital, Mandi

== Jharkhand ==
Name	Location	Note
Sadar Hospital, Ranchi	Ranchi	Opened on August 2011 and owned by government
Brahmananda Narayana Multispeciality Hospital	Jamshedpur	Opened in July 2008 by Narayana Health and the Brahmananda Sewa Sadan Trust

== Karnataka ==
=== Bengaluru ===
- Apollo Hospital
- Bangalore Medical College
- Basaveshwara Teaching and General Hospital, Gulbarga
- Bowring & Lady Curzon Hospitals
- Columbia Asia, Hebbal
- Columbia Asia, Yeshwanthpur
- Dr. Agarwal's Eye Hospital
- Dr. Mohan’s Diabetes Specialities Centre
- Indira Gandhi Institute of Child Health, Bangalore
- Kidwai Memorial Institute of Oncology
- Medicover Hospital
- Minto Eye Hospital, Bangalore Medical College
- Narayana Hrudayalaya, Hosur Road
- National Institute of Mental Health and Neurosciences (Nimhans), Bangalore
- Rajarajeswari Medical College and Hospital
- SDS Tuberculosis and Rajiv Gandhi Institute of Chest diseases
- Sri Jayadeva Institute of Cardiology, Jayanagar
- St. Johns Medical College
- Sukoon Health, Poornapura
- Vanivilas Women and Children Hospital, Bangalore Medical College
- Victoria Hospital, Bangalore Medical College
- Vydehi Institute of Medical Sciences and Research Centre Whitefield, Bangalore

=== Gulbarga ===
- Sri Jayadeva Institute of Cardiology, Sedam road

=== Mysore ===
- All India Institute of Speech and Hearing (AIISH), Manasagangotri
- Cheluvamba Hospital
- Columbia Asia, Belvadi
- Dr. Mohan’s Diabetes Specialities Centre
- Krishna Rajendra Hospital
- Motherhood Hospital
- Narayana Multispeciality Hospital

=== Mangalore ===
- A J Institute of Medical Science
- KMC Hospital, Mangalore
- Wenlock District Hospital

=== Manipal ===
- Kasturba Medical College

== Kerala ==
=== Alappuzha ===
- Government T D Medical College, Alappuzha

=== Kozhikode ===
- Aster MIMS
- Chest Hospital
- Matria Hospital
- Government Medical College, Kozhikode
- Medical College Hospital

=== Kochi ===
- Amrita Institute of Medical Sciences
- Apollo Adlux Hospital
- Aster Medcity
- General Hospital, Ernakulam
- Indira Gandhi Cooperative Hospital
- Lakeshore Hospital
- Lisie Hospital
- Little Flower Hospital
- Medical Trust Hospital
- Meditrina Hospital
- Rajagiri Hospital
- Renai Medicity
- Saraf Hospital
- Sunrise Hospital

=== Kollam ===
- Azeezia Medical College, Meeyannoor, Kollam
- District Hospital, Kollam
- Government Medical College, Kollam
- Meditrina Hospital, Ayathil
- N. S. Memorial Institute of Medical Sciences
- Travancore Medical College Hospital

=== Kottayam ===
- Medical College Hospital, Athirampuzha

=== Palakkad ===
- Meditrina Hospital

=== Thiruvananthapuram ===
- Divya Prabha Eye Hospital
- Government Medical College, Thiruvananthapuram
- Mission Hospital, Pothencode
- Regional Cancer Centre
- Sree Chitra Thirunal Institute of Medical Sciences and Technology

=== Thrissur ===
- Amala Ayurvedic Hospital and Research Centre, Amala Nagar
- Amala Institute of Medical Sciences, Amala Nagar
- Aswini Hospital, Sastha Nagar
- Jubilee Mission Medical College and Research Institute, Thrissur
- Daya General Hospital and Specialty Surgical Centre, Thrissur

=== Malappuram ===
- Shihab Thangal Hospital
- Government District Hospital, Perinthalmanna
- Government District Hospital, Nilambur
- Government Medical College Hospital, Manjeri

== Madhya Pradesh ==
=== Bhopal ===
- All India Institute of Medical Sciences, Bhopal
- Apollo Sage Hospital, Bhopal
- Kamla Nehru Hospital & Gandhi Medical College
- Hamidia Hospital

=== Indore ===
- Apollo Hospital
- Bombay Hospital, Indore
- CHL Indore
- Medanta Hospital
- Shalby Hospital
- Maharaja Yeshwantrao Hospital
- Sri Aurobindo Hospital

=== Jabalpur ===
- Netaji Subhash Chandra Bose Medical College, Jabalpur
- Shalby Hospital, Jabalpur
- Apollo Hospital, Jabalpur

=== Gwalior ===
- Cancer Hospital & Research Centre
- Shalby Hospital
- Sahara Hospital

== Maharashtra ==
=== Aurangabad ===
- Hedgewar Hospital
- MGM Medical College and Hospital, Aurangabad

=== Kalyan ===
- Dr. Agarwal's Eye Hospital
- Fortis Hospital, Kalyan

=== Mumbai ===
- Kokilaben Dhirubhai Ambani Hospital, Four Bungalows, Mumbai.
- Acworth Municipal Hospital for Leprosy, Wadala
- Asian Heart Institute, Bandra-Kurla Complex
- Bhabha Hospital, Bandra
- Bhaktivedanta Hospital, Mira Road
- Bombay Hospital, Marine Lines
- Breach Candy Hospital, Mahalaxmi
- Cooper Hospital, Vile Parle
- D Y Patil Hospital, Nerul
- Doctor Das Multispecialty Hospital, Chembur
- Gokuldas Tejpal Hospital, Fort
- Grant Medical College and Sir Jamshedjee Jeejebhoy Group of Hospitals, Sandhurst Road
- Hinduja Healthcare Surgical, Khar, Mumbai
- Hinduja Hospital, Mahim, Mumbai
- Holy Family Hospital, Bandra
- Hurkisondas Hospital, Girgaon
- Jaslok Hospital, Pedar Road
- KEM Hospital, Parel
- Lilavati Hospital, Bandra
- Lokmanya Tilak Hospital, Sion
- Mahatma Gandhi Memorial Hospital, Parel
- Nanavati Hospital, Vile Parle
- Prince Aly Khan Hospital, Byculla
- Rajawadi Hospital, Ghatkopar
- Saifee Hospital, Charni Road
- Shushrusha Citizens' Co-operative Hospital, Shivaji Park
- Shushrusha's Suman Ramesh Tulsiani Hospital, Vikhroli
- Sunrise Hospital, Bhandup
- Tata Memorial Hospital, Parel

=== Nashik ===
- Shree Saibaba Heart Institute And Research Centre

=== Pimpri-Chinchwad ===
- Aditya Birla Memorial Hospital

=== Pune ===
- Dr. Agarwal's Eye Hospital
- Deenanath Mangeshkar Hospital
- Hardikar Hospital
- Jehangir Hospital
- Joshi Hospital
- Ruby Hall Clinic
- Sahyadri Hospital
- Sassoon Hospital
- embrio ivf centre

=== Nagpur ===
- All India Institute of Medical Sciences, Nagpur
- Government Medical College and Hospital, Nagpur
- Indira Gandhi Government Medical College, Nagpur
- N.K.P. Salve Institute of Medical Sciences Popularly known as Lata Mangeshkar Hospital, Nagpur
- Wockhardt Hospital

=== Thane ===
- Currae Hospital
- Chhatrapati Shivaji Maharaj Hospital & Rajiv Gandhi Medical College

=== Wardha ===
- Kasturba Hospital, Sewagram

=== Yavatmal ===
- Shri Vasantrao Naik Government Medical College

== Manipur ==
=== Imphal ===
- Jawaharlal Nehru Institute of Medical Sciences
- Regional Institute of Medical Sciences

== Meghalaya ==
=== Shillong ===
- North Eastern Indira Gandhi Regional Institute of Health and Medical Sciences

== Odisha ==
=== Angul ===
- District Headquarters Hospital, Angul (DHH)
- Pabitra Mohan Pradhan Medical College and Hospital, Talcher

=== Balasore ===
- District Headquarters Hospital, Balasore (DHH)
- Fakir Mohan Medical College and Hospital

=== Balangir ===
- Bhima Bhoi Medical College and Hospital

=== Bargarh ===
- District Headquarters Hospital, Bargarh (DHH)

=== Baripada ===
- Pandit Raghunath Murmu Medical College and Hospital

=== Berhampur ===
- City Hospital & District Headquarters Hospital, Cuttack (DHH)
- MKCG Medical College and Hospital

=== Bhadrak ===
- District Headquarters Hospital, Bhadrak (DHH)

=== Bhawanipatna ===
- Maa Manikeswari Multispecialty Hospital
- Saheed Rendo Majhi Medical College and Hospital

=== Bhubaneswar ===
- Aditya Ashwini Hospital
- All India Institute of Medical Sciences, Bhubaneswar
- Ankura Hospital for Women & Children
- Apollo Bhubaneswar
- CARE Hospitals
- Dr. Agarwal's Eye Hospital
- Hi-Tech Medical College & Hospital
- Institute of Medical Sciences and Sum Hospital
- Kalinga Institute of Dental Sciences
- Kalinga Institute of Medical Sciences
- Kalinga Hospital
- KIDS Hospital
- Kar Clinic & Hospital
- Manipal Hospitals
- Neelachal Hospital
- Shree Hospitals
- Sparsh Hospitals & Critical Care
- Sunshine Hospital
- Utkal Hospital
- Vivekanand Hospital

=== Boudh ===
- District Headquarters Hospital, Boudh (DHH)

=== Cuttack ===
- Ashwini Hospital
- City Hospital & District Headquarters Hospital, Cuttack (DHH)
- Shanti Memorial Hospital
- Srirama Chandra Bhanja Medical College and Hospital
- Sun Hospital

=== Deogarh ===
- District Headquarters Hospital, Deogarh (DHH)

=== Dhenkanal ===
- District Headquarters Hospital, Dhenkanal (DHH)

=== Gajapati ===
- District Headquarters Hospital, Paralakhemundi (DHH)
- Serango Christian Hospital

=== Jagatsinghpur ===
- District Headquarters Hospital, Jagatsinghpur (DHH)

=== Jajpur ===
- District Headquarters Hospital, Jajpur (DHH)
- Jajati Keshri Medical College and Hospital, Jajpur

=== Jharsuguda ===
- BMRC Jharsuguda Cardiac Care Hospital, Jharsuguda
- District Headquarters Hospital, Jharsuguda (DHH)

=== Kandhamal ===
- District Headquarters Hospital, Phulbani (DHH)
- Sub-Division Hospital, Balliguda
- Swami Laxmanananda Saraswati Medical College & Hospital, Phulbani

=== Kendrapada ===
- District Headquarters Hospital, Kendrapada (DHH)

=== Keonjhar ===
- District Headquarters Hospital, Keonjhar (DHH)
- Dharanidhar Medical College and Hospital

=== Khordha ===
- District Headquarters Hospital, Khordha (DHH)

=== Koraput ===
- District Headquarters Hospital, Koraput (DHH)
- Saheed Laxman Nayak Medical College and Hospital

=== Malkangiri ===
- District Headquarters Hospital, Malkangiri (DHH)

=== Nabarangpur ===
- Christian Hospital, Nabarangpur
- District Headquarters Hospital, Nabarangpur (DHH)

=== Nayagarh ===
- District Headquarters Hospital, Nayagarh (DHH)

=== Nuapada ===
- District Headquarters Hospital, Nuapada (DHH)

=== Puri ===
- District Headquarters Hospital, Puri (DHH)
- Shri Jagannath Medical College and Hospital

=== Rayagada ===
- Christian Hospital, Bissam Cuttack
- District Headquarters Hospital, Rayagada (DHH)

=== Rourkela ===
- Hi-Tech Medical College & Hospital

=== Sambalpur ===
- District Headquarters Hospital, Sambalpur (DHH)
- Veer Surendra Sai Institute of Medical Sciences and Research

=== Subarnapur ===
- District Headquarters Hospital, Subarnapur (DHH)

=== Sundargarh ===
- District Headquarters Hospital, Sundargarh (DHH)
- Government Medical College and Hospital, Sundargarh

== Pondicherry ==
- Aarupadai Veedu Medical College
- Aravind Eye Hospital
- Dr. Mohan’s Diabetes Specialities Centre
- Jawaharlal Institute of Postgraduate Medical Education and Research
- Mahatma Gandhi Medical College and Research Institute, Pillaiyarkuppam
- Pondicherry Institute of Medical Sciences, Kalapet
- Rajiv Gandhi Government Women And Children's Hospital
- Sri Venkateshwaraa Medical College Hospital and Research Centre
- Vinayaka Missions Medical College

== Punjab ==
=== Ludhiana ===
- Rama Sofat Hospital

=== Mohali ===
- Fortis Hospital
- Motherhood Hospital
- Shalby Hospital

== Rajasthan ==
Name	Type	Managed by	Location
Bhagwan Mahaveer Cancer Hospital and Research Centre	Private	KG Kothari Memorial Trust	Jaipur
Mathura Das Mathur Hospital	Public	Government of Rajasthan	Jodhpur
Narayana Multispeciality Hospital	Private	Narayana Health	Jaipur
Santokba Durlabhji Memorial Hospital	Private	Santokba Durlabhji Trust	Jaipur
Sawai Man Singh Hospital	Public	Government of Rajasthan	Jaipur
PBM Hospital	Public	Government of Rajasthan	Bikaner

== Tamil Nadu ==
=== Chennai ===
- Adyar Cancer Institute
- Apollo Hospital, Greams Road
- Balaji Dental and Craniofacial Hospital
- Billroth Hospitals
- Dr. Mehta's Hospitals
- Dr. Mohan’s Diabetes Specialities Centre
- Fortis Malar Hospital
- Global Hospitals & Health City
- Government General Hospital
- Government Hospital of Thoracic Medicine
- Government Institute of Rehabilitation Medicine
- Government Royapettah Hospital
- Hindu Mission Hospital
- Kilpauk Medical College Hospital
- Madras Medical Mission
- Mehta Multispeciality Hospitals India Pvt. Ltd.
- MIOT Hospital
- Motherhood Hospital
- National Institute of Siddha
- Regional Institute of Ophthalmology and Government Ophthalmic Hospital
- Sankara Nethralaya
- Southern Railway Headquarters Hospital, Chennai
- Sir Ivan Stedeford Hospital
- Sri Ramachandra Medical College and Research Institute
- Stanley Medical College and Hospital
- Sundaram Medical Foundation (SMF Hospital), Anna Nagar
- Tamil Nadu Government Dental College and Hospital
- Tamil Nadu Government Multi Super Speciality Hospital
- Voluntary Health Services

=== Coimbatore ===
- Aravind Eye Hospital
- Dr. Mohan’s Diabetes Specialities Centre
- PSG Institute of Medical Sciences & Research
- Sankara Eye Foundation
- Sri Ramakrishna Hospital

=== Madurai ===
- All India Institute of Medical Sciences, Madurai
- Apollo Hospitals
- Aravind Eye Hospital
- Dr. Mohan’s Diabetes Specialities Centre

=== Salem ===
- Aravind Eye Hospital

=== Vellore ===
- Christian Medical College & Hospital
- Dr. Mohan’s Diabetes Specialities Centre, Katpadi
- Government Vellore Medical College Hospital
- Sri Narayani Hospital & Research Centre Melvisharam

=== Tiruchirappalli ===
- Divisional Railway Hospital, Golden Rock

=== Tirunelveli ===
- Adiparasakthi Hospital
- Krishna Hospital
- Shifa Hospital

=== Nagercoil ===
- Catherine Booth Hospital
- Dr. Jeyasekharan Hospital & Nursing Home
- Little Flower Hospital

== Telangana ==
=== Hyderabad ===
- Sir Ronald Ross Institute of Tropical and Communicable Diseases
- Dr. Agarwal's Eye Hospital
- Dr. Mohan’s Diabetes Specialities Centre, Domalguda & Jubilee Hills
- Durgabai Deshmukh Hospital, Vidyanagar
- Fernandez Hospital, Boggulkunta
- Krishna Institute of Medical Sciences
- L. V. Prasad Eye Institute
- LifeSpring Hospitals
- Medicover Hospitals (HITEC City, Begumpet, Chanda Nagar)
- National Institute of Mentally Handicapped, New Bowenpally
- Nizam's Institute of Medical Sciences, Somajiguda
- Osmania General Hospital, Afzal Gunj
- Sarojini Devi Eye Hospital, Mehidipatnam
- Yashoda Hospitals (Malakpet, Secunderabad, Somajiguda, HITEC City)
- Care Hospitals
- Rainbow Hospitals (Banjara Hills)
- Durru Shehvar Children's & General Hospital (Purani Haveli)
- Apollo Hospitals(Jubilee Hills, Karimnagar)
- Gleneagles Global Hospitals

(Lakdikapul)

- Continental Hospital, Gachibowli Nanakramguda.
- K K Reddy Hospital,

Kukatpally

- Sai Neha Hospital

Kondapur

- Lakshmi Hospital & Research Centre, Himayat Nagar
- Cloudnine Hospital, Gachibowli.
- Matrika Hospital Somajiguda
- Remedy Hospital Kukatpally
- Bristlecone Hospital Barkatpura
- Trident Hospital Shamshabad

=== Warangal ===
- Mahatma Gandhi Memorial Hospital

=== Nizamabad ===
- Government General Hospital, Nizamabad

== Tripura ==
=== Agartala ===
- Agartala Government Medical College
- Tripura Medical College & Dr. B.R. Ambedkar Memorial Teaching Hospital

== Uttar Pradesh ==
=== Agra ===
- District Hospital, Agra
- Institute of Mental Health and Hospital
- Sarojini Naidu Medical College and Hospital

=== Aligarh ===
- Jawaharlal Nehru Medical College, AMU, Aligarh
- KK Hospital

=== Ghaziabad ===
- Manipal Hospital
- Max Super Speciality Hospital, Vaishali

=== Gorakhpur ===
- All India Institute of Medical Sciences, Gorakhpur
- Baba Raghav Das Medical College
- KMC Medical College & Hospital, Maharajganj

=== Kanpur ===
- Ganesh Shankar Vidyarthi Memorial Medical College
- Hallet Hospital
- J L Rohatgi Memorial Eye Hospital
- Rama Medical College
- Regency Hospital

=== Lucknow ===
- King George's Medical University
- Mayo Hospital
- Medanta Hospital
- Shalby Hospital
- Sahara Hospital
- SGPGI

=== Meerut ===
- Metro Hospital & Heart Institute, Meerut

=== Moradabad ===
- Teerthanker Mahaveer Medical College & Research Centre

=== Noida ===
- Fortis Hospital
- Jaypee Hospital
- Kailash Group of Hospitals
- Max Multi Speciality Centre
- Metro Hospitals & Heart Institute
- Motherhood Hospital
- Yatharth Hospitals

=== Prayagraj ===
- Kamla Nehru Memorial Hospital

=== Varanasi ===
- Sir Sunderlal Hospital (IMS BHU)

== Uttarakhand ==
=== Dehradun ===
- Government Doon Medical College
- Kailash Hospital, Dehradun
- Max Super Speciality Hospital
- Shri Mahant Indresh Hospital

=== Others ===
- All India Institute of Medical Sciences, Rishikesh
- Metro Hospital & Heart Institute, Haridwar

== West Bengal ==
Name	Type	Managed by	Location
Belle Vue Clinic	Private	MP Birla Group	Kolkata
Bidhannagar Sub-Divisional Hospital	Public	Government of West Bengal	Kolkata
Desun Hospital & Heart Institute	Private	A unit of P. N. Memorial Neurocentre & Research Institute Ltd.	Kolkata
The Mission Hospital	Private	A unit of Durgapur Medical Centre Pvt. Ltd.	Durgapur
Narayana Multispeciality Hospital	Private	Narayana Health	Howrah
Narayana Superspeciality Hospital	Private	Narayana Health	Howrah
Rabindranath Tagore International Institute of Cardiac Sciences	Private	Narayana Health	Kolkata
Suri Sadar Hospital	Public	Government of West Bengal	Birbhum
Tata Medical Center	Private	Tata Medical Center Trust	Kolkata

== See also ==
- Healthcare in India
- Indian states ranking by institutional delivery
