= Devadoss =

Devadoss is a surname. Notable people with the surname include:

- David Devadoss (1868–1951), Indian judge
- Manohar Devadoss (1936–2022), Indian artist and writer
- Satyan Devadoss, American mathematician

== See also ==
- Devadoss Hospital
