= Ford Hospital =

Ford Hospital may refer to:

- Ford Hospital (Nebraska), a former hospital in Omaha, Nebraska, United States
- Ford Hospital and Research Centre, a hospital and research center in Patna, Bihar, India
- Henry Ford Hospital, a hospital and research complex in Detroit, Michigan, United States
