= Hardikar =

Hardikar may refer to:

== People ==
- Lata Mangeshkar (1929–2022), Indian playback singer, born as Hema Hardikar
- Manohar Hardikar (1936–1995), Indian cricket player
- Narayan Subbarao Hardikar (1889–1975), Indian freedom fighter and politician
- Aditi Hardikar American public official

== Buildings ==
- Hardikar Hospital, a hospital in Pune, India
