= Bhagwan Mahaveer Cancer Hospital and Research Centre =

- K G Kothari Memorial Trust
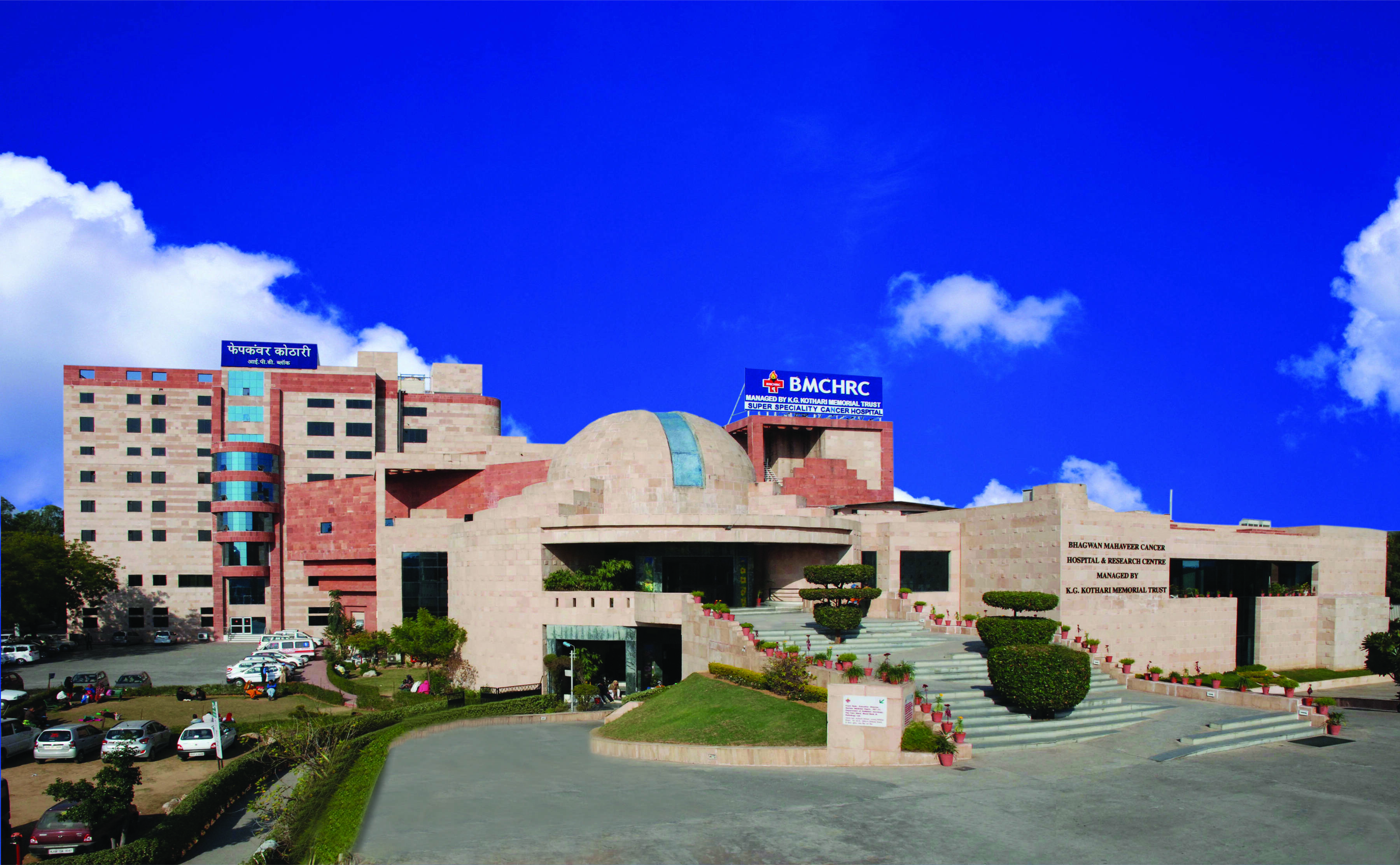

Geography
- Location: Jawahar Lal Nehru Marg, Bajaj Nagar, Jaipur, Rajasthan, India
- Coordinates: 26.863498°N 75.805754°E

Organisation
- Care system: Private
- Funding: Not-for-profit
- Type: Specialist

Services
- Beds: over 300
- Speciality: Oncology

History
- Opened: 1997

Links
- Website: bmchrc.org
- Lists: Hospitals in India

The Bhagwan Mahaveer Cancer Hospital and Research Centre (BMCHRC) is located in Jawahar Lal Nehru Marg, Bajaj Nagar, Jaipur, Rajasthan. The hospital is NABH and NABL accredited super speciality cancer treatment centre. The hospital is following international protocol for cancer treatment managed by K.G. Kothari Memorial Trust.

== History ==
In 1992, the initiative of establishing a cancer hospital in Rajasthan was put forward in August. The meeting was held in the presence of Late Bhairon Singh Shekhawat, the then Chief Minister of Rajasthan & Late Vidya Vinod Kala. The approval on the proposal to establish the centre was given, and the state government allotted 22166 sq. yd. of land for construction.

The Bhagwan Mahaveer Cancer Hospital and Research Centre was commissioned in 1996 by Navrattan Kothari and became operational in 1997 as a centre with values and concern for every patient. Started as a 50-bed hospital, it now has 300 beds, and an IPD block is under construction.

== Facilities ==
BMCHRC provides comprehensive cancer care to patients. The specialities include

- Surgical Oncology
- Neuro Onco Surgery
- Ortho Oncology
- Plastic & Reconstructive Surgery
- Medical Oncology
- Bone Marrow Transplant (BMT)
- Radiation Oncology
- Haematology-oncology
- Gynecologic Oncology
- Gastroenterology
- Anesthesiology

== Awards ==
- 2016: Best Healthcare Trust Provider Award

== R&D and Technology ==
The hospital has 6 integrated modular operation theatres, complete with all the latest modalities in cancer surgery like Laser Cancer Surgery and Micro Laryngeal Surgery. In addition to these, the hospital also has a special 14 bedded Surgical ICU, a 60 bedded daycare ward for chemotherapy patients, and a dedicated Pain And Palliative Care Department.

BMCHRC is also well known for providing assistance and clinical trial grounds to researchers from around the globe. A testimony to this is the treatment of bone cancer using the hot dog technique, which is considered to be a boon for treating bone cancer in patients.
