= Matria Hospital =

Hospital for women and children in Kerala

- Formerly: Cradle Hospital Calicut
- Company type: Private
- Industry: Healthcare
- Founded: 2010 (16 years ago)
- Headquarters: Calicut, Kerala, India
- Key people: Dr Mohammed Kutty, Founder and Chairman; Dr Mohammed Kasim, Managing Director
- Services: Maternity hospital
- Website: matria.in

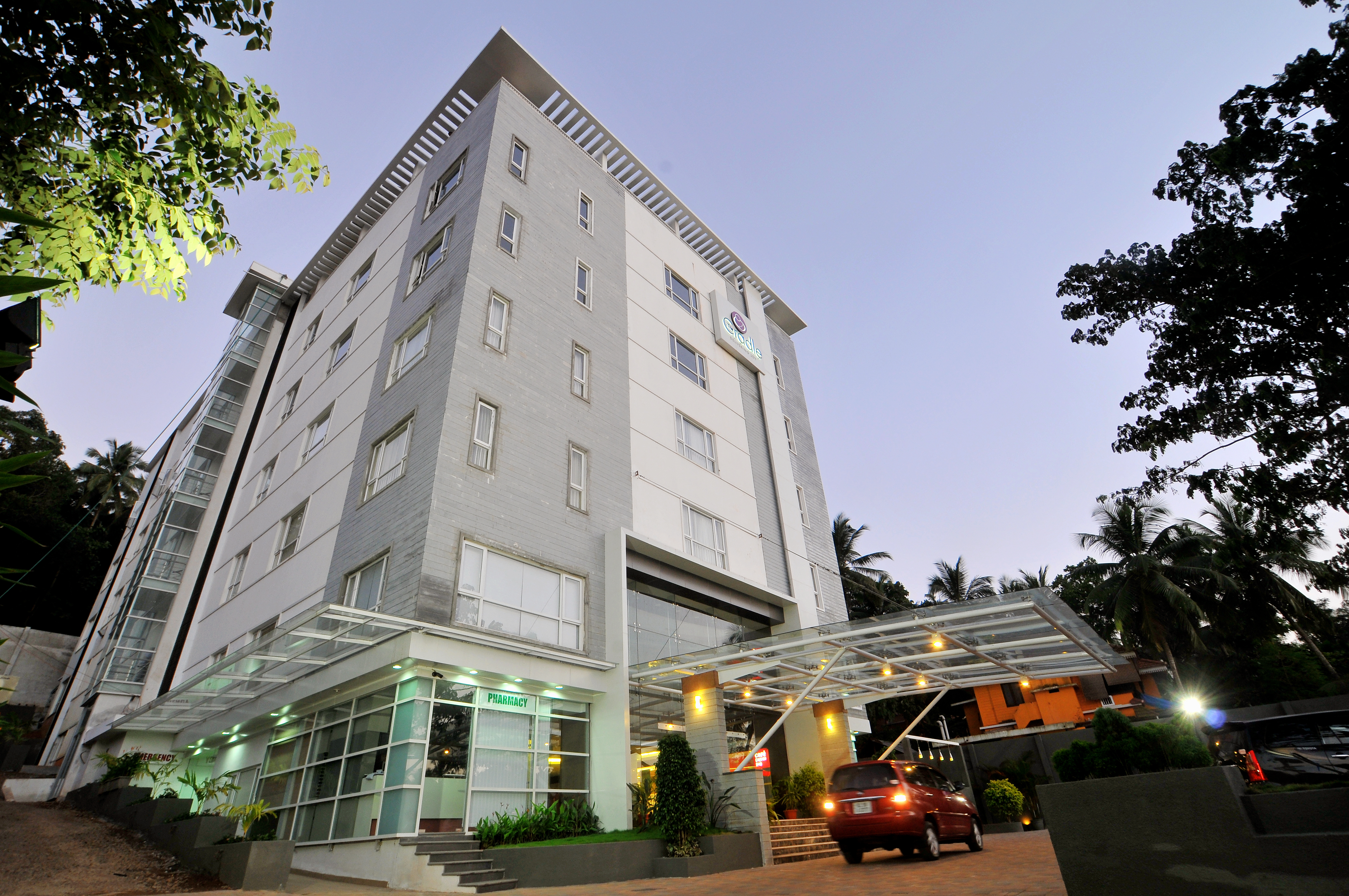
The Cradle, Calicut

The Matria Hospital for Women and Children, formerly known as Cradle Hospital Calicut, is a hospital in Calicut, Kerala, India. Founded in 2010 by Dr. V. K. Kutty, the hospital specialises in gynecology and neonatal care.

In its first 10 years, the hospital delivered 15,000 babies. Each time a new baby is born, the hospital gifts a mango sapling to the parents. The tradition was started by Dr. Kutty because his mother was unhappy that so many trees were cut down to make way for the hospital.

The hospital takes a modern approach to care for women and children, offering laparoscopy surgery and diagnostic services. In 2015, the Cradle Hospital Calicut launched a mobile health app to help parents manage prenatal and paediatric needs, such as vaccinations and appointments.

== See also ==
- List of hospitals in India
