= Fernandez Hospital =

- Fernandez Foundation

Geography
- Location: Hyderabad, Telangana, India

Organisation
- Care system: Private
- Type: Specialist

Services
- Emergency department: Yes
- Beds: 320
- Speciality: Maternity, Neonatology, Women’s Health

History
- Founded: 1948

Links
- Website: www.fernandezhospital.com
- Lists: Hospitals in India

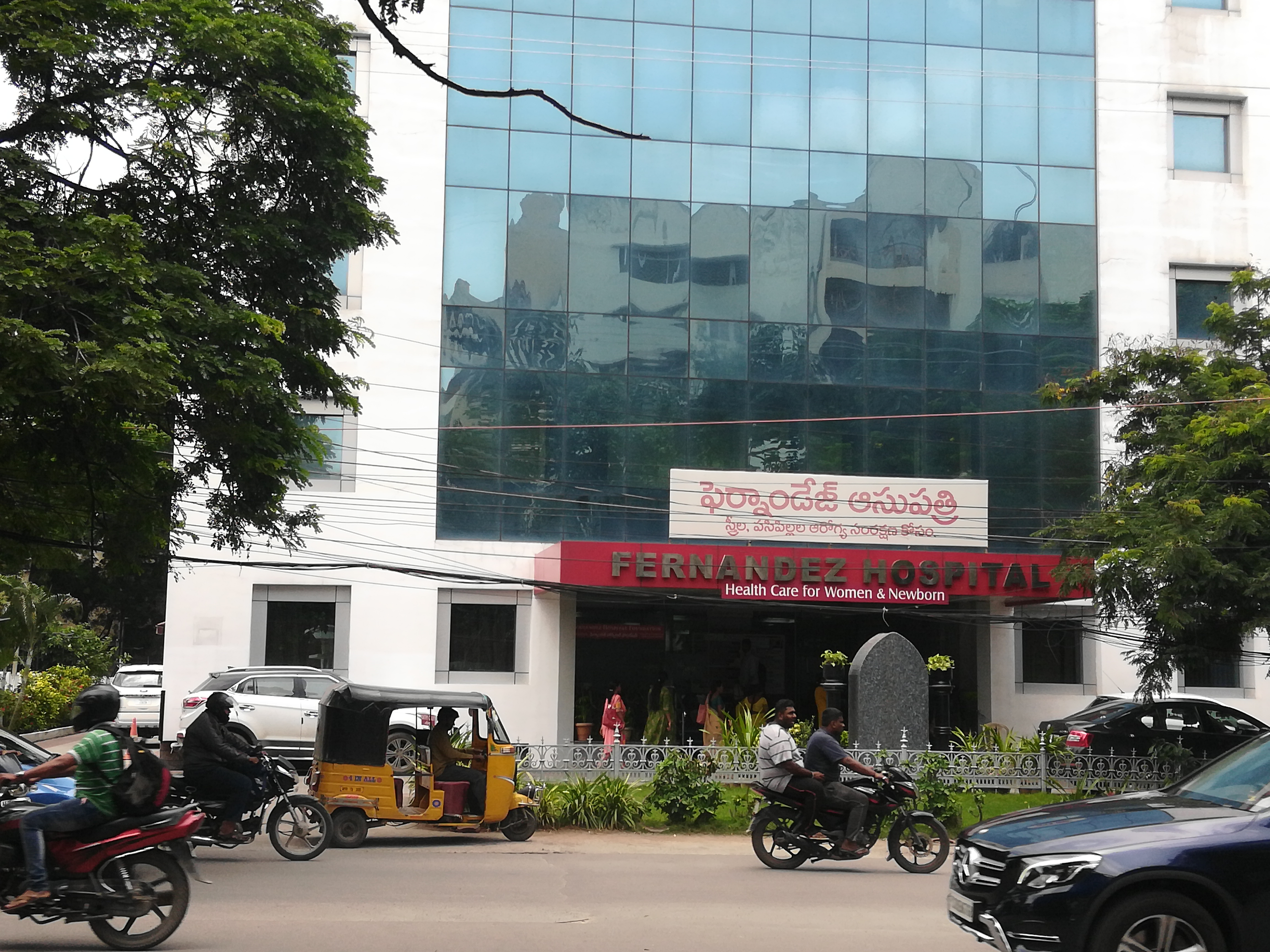
Photograph of the entrance of the hospital Fernandez Hospital, Hyderabad, Telangana, India. Fernandez Hospital is a private tertiary care hospital for obstretics in Hyderabad. Established in 1948 as a maternity clinic, it is now a hospital chain offering healthcare for women and children from six locations with approximately 9,000 births each year.

The hospital was founded by Dr. Lourdes C Fernandez and Dr. Leslie J Fernandez. It is now under the care of their daughter Dr. Evita Fernandez since 1985.

In 2024, Fernandez Hospital opened a children's eye clinic in at its Necklace Road clinic, in conjunction with LV Prasad Eye Institute (LVPEI). In 2025, it opened a specialty outpatient clinic at Boggulkunta in Hyderabad.
