= GMERS Medical College and Hospital, Sola =

Medical college in Ahmedabad, Gujarat

- Type: Government
- Established: 2012; 14 years ago
- Affiliations: Gujarat University
- Dean: Dr. Yogeshanand S. Goswami
- Location: Ahmedabad, Gujarat, India
- Website: http://www.gmersmchsola.com/Home

GMERS Medical College and Hospital, Sola is a medical college located in Ahmedabad, Gujarat. It was established in the year 2012. The college imparts the degree Bachelor of Medicine and Surgery (MBBS). Nursing and para-medical courses are also offered. The college is affiliated to Gujarat University and is recognised by National Medical Commission. The selection to the college is done on the basis of merit through National Eligibility and Entrance Test. Yearly undergraduate student intake is 150.

== Courses ==
GMERS Medical College and Hospital, Sola undertakes education and training of students MBBS courses. This college is offering 150 MBBS seats from 2019 of which 85% Seats are of state quota and 15% is for Nation Counselling.

== Sola Civil Hospital ==
Sola Civil Hospital

Geography
- Location: Sola, Ahmedabad, Gujarat, India

Organisation
- Care system: Public
- Type: General

Services
- Emergency department: Yes

Links
- Website: GMERS Sola-Hospital

Sola Civil Hospital is a public healthcare facility situated in the Sola area of Ahmedabad, Gujarat, India. The hospital offers a wide range of healthcare services, encompassing general medical care as well as specialized treatments in departments such as cardiology, neurology, orthopedics, pediatrics, and gynecology. Sola Civil Hospital aims to deliver affordable healthcare, with a focus on serving disadvantaged sections of society.

=== Services and facilities ===
The hospital is equipped with modern medical technology and provides emergency services, outpatient and inpatient care, as well as surgical procedures. It has also conducted clinical trials for Covaxin, the COVID-19 vaccine developed in India.

=== Community outreach ===
The hospital actively participates in public health initiatives and campaigns for disease prevention. Additionally, it organizes health camps, offering free or subsidized healthcare services to underprivileged communities.

== See also ==
- Healthcare in India
- List of hospitals in India
