= SevenHills Hospital =

SevenHills Hospitals
- SevenHills Healthcare, Ltd.

Geography
- Location: Mumbai, Maharashtra and Visakhapatnam, Andhra Pradesh, India

Organisation
- Care system: Rajiv Gandhi Jeevandayee Arogya Yojana
- Type: General
- Patron: Jitendra Das Maganti, founder and managing director

Services
- Emergency department: Yes
- Beds: 1,500 (Mumbai)

History
- Founded: 1986 (Vishakapatnam), 2010 (Mumbai)

Links
- Website: www.sevenhillshospital.com
- Lists: Hospitals in India

SevenHills Hospital is a group of three private hospitals, operating under central management, in Mumbai, Maharashtra, and Visakhapatnam, Andhra Pradesh, India. The Visakhapatnam branch opened in 1986, and the Mumbai branch opened in 2010. The Mumbai hospital was the result of a ₹10 billion public-private partnership between SevenHills and Brihanmumbai Municipal Corporation (BMC). At 17 acres (6.9 ha) and 2,000,000 sq ft (190,000 m^{2}) of built-up space, the Mumbai hospital was designed to be the country's largest hospital in a single location. A dedicated COVID-19 hospital was added in 2020.

== History and facilities ==
In 2002, talks began between SevenHills and Brihanmumbai Municipal Corporation (BMC) to open a multi-specialty branch of the hospital in Mumbai. According to the resulting public-private partnership agreement, signed in 2005, BMC gave SevenHills a 60-year lease on a 17-acre (6.9 ha) plot in the Mumbai suburb of Andheri, near the Mumbai International Airport. In exchange, SevenHills agreed to reserve 20% (300) of its 1,500 beds for low-income patients who come through the BMC healthcare system, charging them at the same rate as offered by public hospitals.

The funding for the project came from private capital and bank loans, and the majority stakeholder is Jitendra Das Maganti, M.D., the founder and managing director of the hospitals. The Mumbai hospital was inaugurated in July 2010 by the president of India, Pratibha Patil, which caused controversy as the hospital space for low-income patients was not ready.

The Mumbai complex has a 2,000,000 sq ft (190,000 m^{2}) bghuilt-up area with plans for 1500 beds (300 for critical care), intensive care units for cardiology, burns, neonates, and paediatrics, and 36 operating rooms. The hospitals have services in over 30 specialties including Neurology and Neurosurgery, Cardiology, Oncology, Orthopedic Surgery, General Surgery and Laparoscopic Surgery, Emergency Services, Pediatrics, Otorhinolaryngology, Nephrology and Kidney Transplant, and Liver Transplantation.

== Financial difficulties and controversy ==
The hospital began operations in phases; in the first phase, 300 beds were ready. However, all of the wards meant for BMC patients were still under construction, and a memorandum of understanding (MOU) between BMC and the hospital had not been signed. An expansion of the hospital (to open more of the 1,500 beds) was dependent upon the MOU. When the two parties could not agree on the terms, the matter was brought first to a civic house session (in 2010) and then to the Bombay High Court (in 2011). Finally, in 2013, SevenHills agreed to provide 20% of all hospital beds (general and ICU) and facilities to poor patients, and to provide medicines at BMC rates. In addition, BMC was given power to "take over the hospital" if the hospital violated the agreement. An MOU between BMC and Seven Hills was signed in December 2013, and the hospital received a certificate of occupancy.

The delay in hospital expansion severely hampered the ability of SevenHills to raise revenue which, in turn, led to increased debt. In 2013, JPMorgan Chase, through its Asia Infrastructure Fund, invested ₹2.7 billion (US$28 million) in SevenHills, allowing it to add 300 beds. A subsequent investment made JP Morgan a 35% owner in the company. In addition, hospital lenders, including Axis Bank, agreed to restructuring the hospital's debt of ₹8 billion (US$83 million). Maganti remained the controlling shareholder.

In 2015–16, SevenHills reported revenue of ₹2.3 billion (US$24 million)2.3 billion and a loss of ₹1.47 billion (US$15 million), and the company continued to operate at 20% capacity. According to SevenHills's annual report, "The current level of operations of the company could not support the fixed overheads (finance costs, depreciation and amortization expenses) incurred for its Mumbai Hospital. Time overrun, coupled with substantial increase in cost and lower operational level, had put strain on the operational cash flows of the company, thereby resulting in liquidity problem for the company". As of 2017, only 300 beds at the Mumbai hospital are operational.

The Mumbai High Court gave the hospital until 31 March 2017 to repay its debts. JP Morgan first tried to find a buyer for its holdings, then tried to gain control of the company. Other companies have also expressed an interest in buying out the hospital's debt, however, no agreements were reached.

On 20 November 2017, the hospital's lenders filed for insolvency, which will force an auction of the hospital. The total liability is estimated at ₹11 billion (US$110 million)–₹12 billion (US$120 million).

== Hospital outreach ==
In 2010, the hospital launched a "Save a Heart" program for under-privileged children with congenital heart defects. In 2011, Bollywood actor Hrithik Roshan donated Rs 1.5 million for ten children who were in need of cardiac surgery.

In 2012, the British Deputy High Commissioner gifted a Mobile Diabetes Unit to SevenHills, the first such unit in Mumbai. The mobile clinic was named Amitabh in honor of actor Amitabh Bachchan, the international patron of Silver Star, a charity that specialises in raising awareness of diabetes.

== COVID-19 hospital ==
COVID-19 hospital
- SevenHills Hospital

Geography
- Location: Mumbai, Mumbai, Maharashtra

Organisation
- Type: Specialist

Services
- Beds: 100
- Speciality: COVID-19 patients

History
- Opened: 2020

In 2020, a COVID-19 hospital was constructed as part of the Seven Hills Hospital group in Mumbai City, India. It was constructed by Reliance Industries Limited for COVID-19 patients. It is the first dedicated COVID-19 hospital in India and managed by Reliance Industries Limited AND Brihanmumbai Municipal Corporation (Brihanmumbai Municipal Corporation)

for SevenHills Hospital Group.[16]
