= Christian Hospital, Bissam Cuttack =

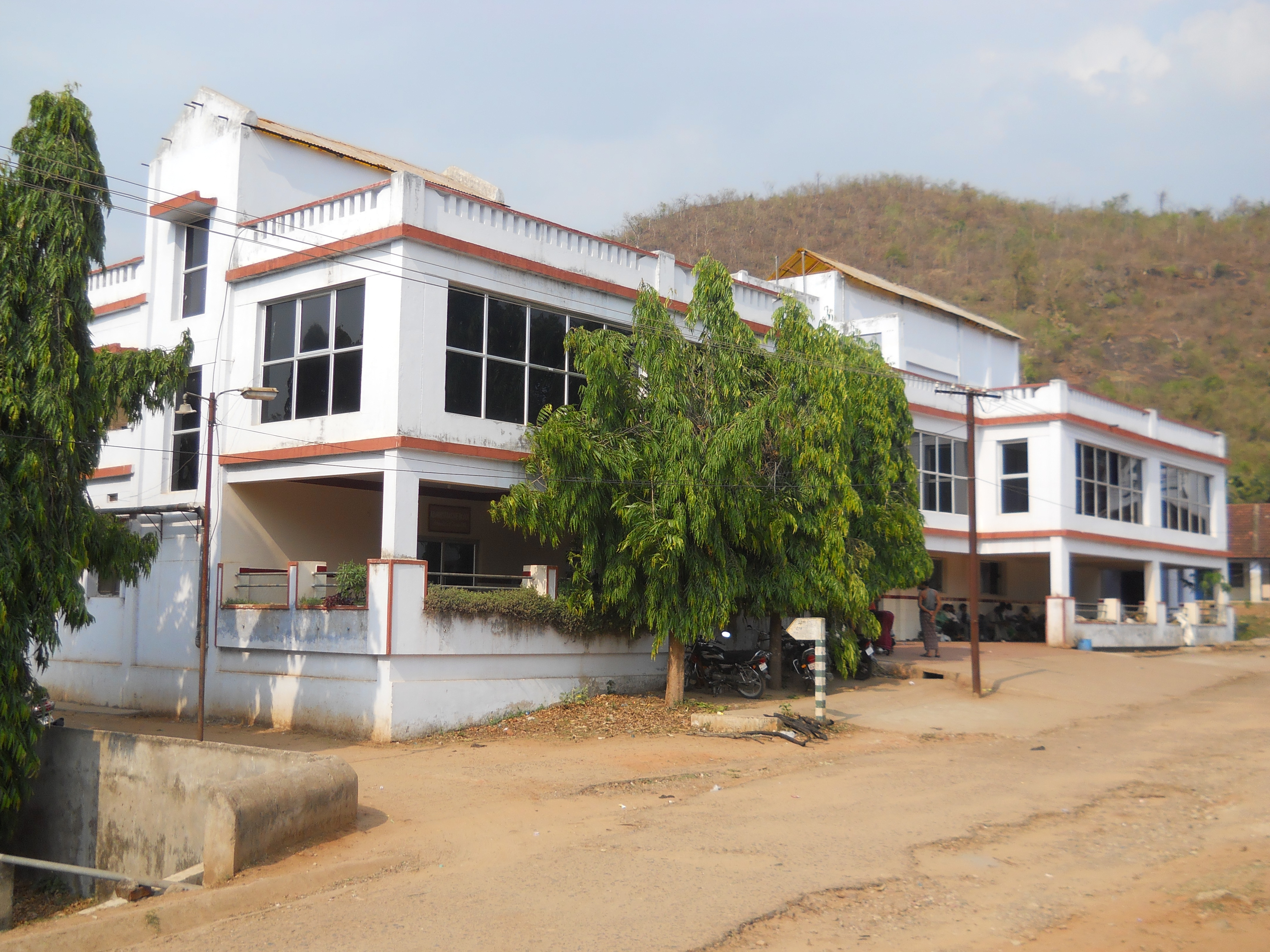
- Mother and child care deptt. of Christian Hospital, Bissam cuttack

Geography
- Location: Bissam Cuttack, Rayagada district, Odisha, India
- Coordinates: 19.516551°N 83.507285°E

Organisation
- Type: General

History
- Founded: 1954

Links
- Website: www.chbmck.org
- Lists: Hospitals in India

Christian Hospital, Bissamcuttack is a prime not-for-profit missionary hospital as well as one of the private recognized hospitals of Indian Railways in the most deprived regions of the state of Odisha, India. The hospital extends its services in general medicine, general surgery, obstetrics and gynaecology, pediatrics, ophthalmology, orthopaedics, dental, chaplaincy, nursing education and a Community Health programme called MITRA (Madsen's Institute for Tribal and Rural Advancement). The hospital also runs a recognised college of nursing on the medical campus.

== History ==
Christian Hospital, Bissamcuttack (better known as CHB) started on the verandah of a church in the year 1954, by the Danish missionary Dr. Elizabeth Madsen (1913–1991). After a prolonged service of 11 years she wanted to handover the charge to a suitable successor. Madsen's search for a successor came to an end when she found Mr. & Mrs. Henry. Nancy Lott, while working in India as a volunteer from the United Church of Christ, met Dr Virendra K. Henry and married him. In 1975 Dr. and Mrs. Henry joined to take over the hospital. The Henrys worked at Bissamcuttack for a long time and later moved to Mungeli Christian Hospital. Today the hospital has its own buildings and has extended its services in out-patient department and in-patient departments. The hospital is a non-profit organisation and a member of the Conference on World Mission, Athens-2005. The medical centre celebrated its Diamond Jubilee in 2004. Some notable features of CHB are as follows:

- Starting in 1992, CHB became the first hospital in the state to start routine screening of blood donors for HIV.
- CHB was one of the first hospitals in the state to introduce incubators for Neonatal Care.
- CHB was the first hospital in India to run a community-based, self-supporting Malaria Control Programme using impregnated mosquito nets.

== See also ==
- Council of Christian Hospitals
- List of hospitals in India
