= Regency Hospital, Kanpur =

Regency Hospital
- Regency Healthcare

Geography
- Location: Kanpur, Uttar Pradesh, India
- Coordinates: 26.481589°N 80.316584°E

Organisation
- Type: Specialist

Services
- Emergency department: 24 Hours
- Beds: 550+
- Speciality: Renal sciencies

History
- Founded: 1995

Links
- Website: regencyhealthcare.in
- Lists: Hospitals in India

Regency Hospital is a Super speciality tertiary care corporate hospital in Uttar Pradesh, India, established in 1995. The hospital was established in technical consultancy with Indian Hospital Corporation Ltd. (Apollo Hospital). Regency Hospital Ltd was a listed Public Ltd. Company at BSE and UP Stock Exchange Ltd. The hospital has regular OPD, 24 hours emergency service with in-patient admission facilities for more than 200 patients.
