= Desun Hospital =

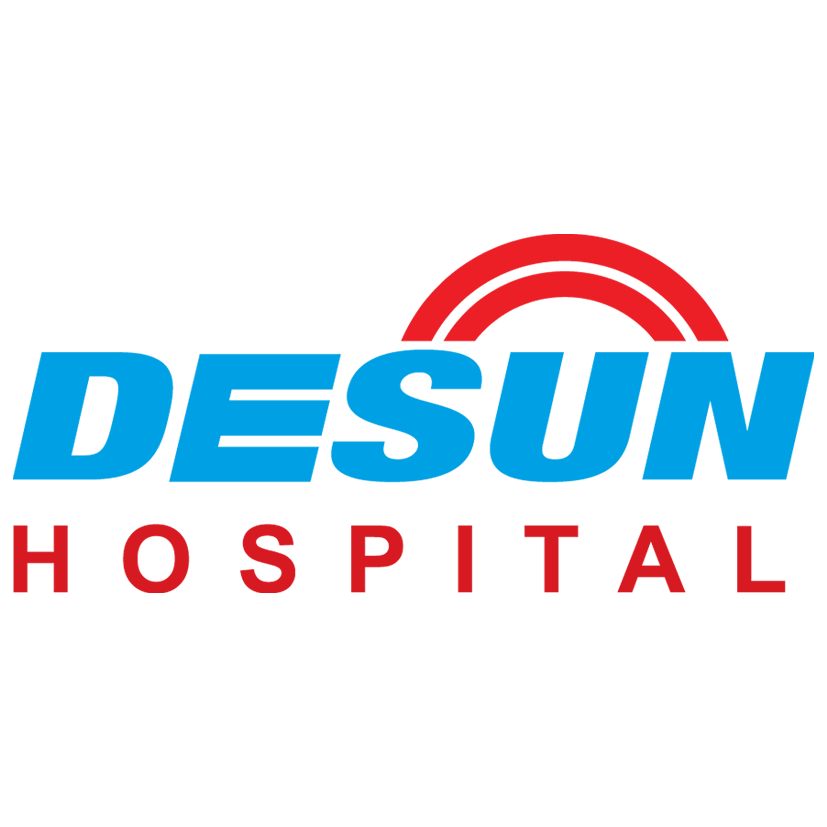

Geography
- Location: Kasba Golpark, Kolkata, West Bengal, India
- Coordinates: 22°30′53.43″N 88°24′03.97″E

Organisation
- Type: Specialist

Services
- Emergency department: <9051715171>
- Speciality: Cardiology, Emergency, Orthopedics, Oncology

History
- Founded: 2008; 18 years ago

Links
- Website: http://www.desunhospital.com/
- Lists: Hospitals in India

Desun Hospital is a JCI (Joint Commission International) and NABH accredited 750 beds hospital with dedicated 100 beds for women & children in Kolkata, West Bengal, India. Desun Hospital has another 300 beds hospital at Siliguri and also planned to open Hospital in Bangladesh.

== Overview ==
Desun hospital was founded by Sajal Dutta in 2008, who pursued Mechanical Engineering from Jadavpur University and post-graduation degree in Business Management from IIM Calcutta (Joka). The hospital has a ten storied building and is spread across 250,000 sq. ft area.

=== Departments ===
- Cardiology
- Neurology
- Nephrology
- General Medicine
- ENT
- Gastroenterology
- Gynaecology
- Oncology
- Emergency Med
