= Paras Healthcare =

Geography
- Location: Paras Twin Towers, 1st Floor, B, Golf Course Rd, Sector 54, Gurugram, Haryana 122022, India

Organisation
- Care system: Private

Services
- Beds: 900+

History
- Founded: 2006

Links
- Website: www.parashospitals.com
- Lists: Hospitals in India

Paras Healthcare Pvt. Ltd. is a chain of hospitals offering specialized tertiary medical care. The first Paras Hospital was established in Gurgaon in 2006. Over the years, the healthcare organization has established its specialty centers in Chandigarh, Panchkula, Darbhanga, and Patna, with a total capacity of 730 beds.

Paras Healthcare was founded by Dr. Dharminder Nagar. The organization is broadly categorized into Paras Hospitals and Paras Bliss, both focusing on respective specialized medical facilities. On June 3, 2019, Paras Healthcare announced the appointment of Puneet Srivastava as its Vice President.

Paras Hospitals in Gurgaon, Patna, and Darbhanga offer multispecialty tertiary care, while Paras Bliss in Panchkula and New Delhi focuses on specialized mother and child care.

The organization plans to expand the number of healthcare units in the country, with new centers to be announced in Uttar Pradesh.

== Accreditation ==
Paras healthcare hospitals are NABH accredited.

== Hospital Networks ==
- Paras Hospitals Gurugram
- Paras HMRI Hospital Patna
- Paras Hospitals Panchkula
- Paras JK Hospital Udaipur

Unaccredited

- Paras Global Hospital Darbhanga
- Paras HEC Hospital Ranchi

== Medical Treatments ==
The key specialties that are mainly focused in all units are - cancer care, neurology, neurosurgery, orthopedics & joint replacement, urology, nephrology, kidney transplant, cardiology, cardiac sciences, gastroenterology & GI surgery, general & lap surgery along plastic surgery. Approximately every unit has at least 30 specialties and super specialties.

== Cancer Care Center ==
In May 2019, Managing Director Dr. Dharminder Nagar inaugurated a Free Cancer Care Center in Patna.

== Accomplishments ==
Paras HMRI Hospital, Patna achieves an AO Fellowship accreditation by Switzerland-based Association for the Study of Internal Fixation.

== Academics ==
Paras Healthcare hospitals are actively involved in medical education and training programs. Several units are recognized for conducting postgraduate and diploma courses in various specialties.

The academic programs offered include:

- Diplomate of National Board (DNB) courses in specialties such as General Medicine, General Surgery, Orthopedics, Pediatrics, Anaesthesia, Radiology, and other super-specialties (as per accreditation).
- Fellowship programs in subspecialties including critical care, cardiology, neurology, and minimally invasive surgery.
- Short-term certificate courses and observer-ship programs for medical graduates and interns.
- Continuing Medical Education (CME), workshops, and clinical training sessions conducted regularly for skill development and knowledge enhancement.

Paras HMRI Hospital, Patna and other tertiary care centers under Paras Healthcare serve as teaching hospitals, providing hands-on clinical exposure and research opportunities for trainees.

The academic programs are conducted in accordance with the guidelines of the National Board of Examinations (NBE) and other relevant regulatory bodies.
