= Acworth Municipal Hospital for Leprosy =

Government leprosy hospital in Mumbai

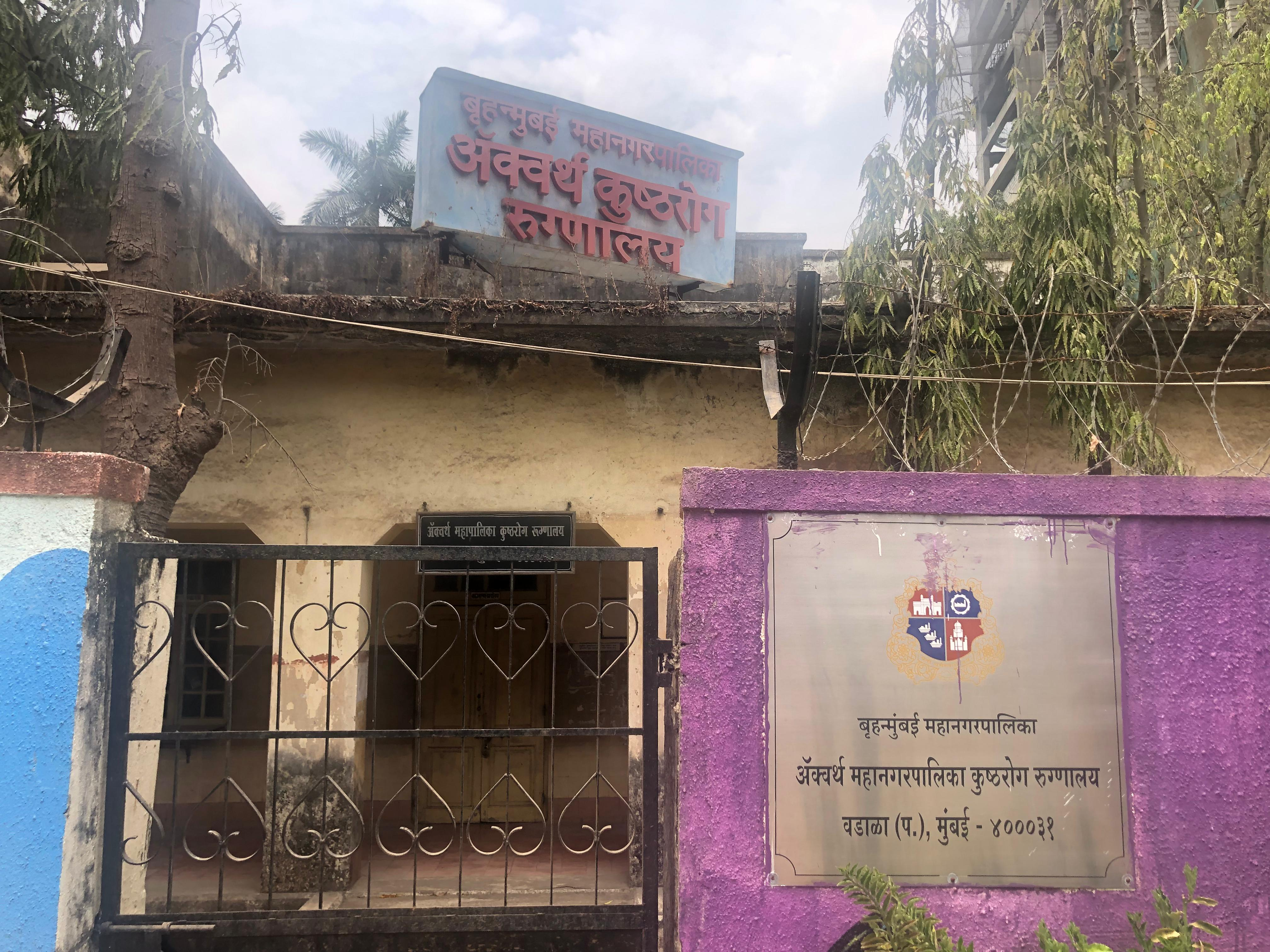
- An entrance gate of the hospital

Geography
- Location: Wadala, Mumbai, India

History
- Opened: 1890

Links
- Lists: Hospitals in India

Acworth Municipal Hospital for Leprosy (AMHL), or simply Acworth Leprosy Hospital, is a public hospital for leprosy located in Wadala, Mumbai. It is the city's only dedicated leprosy centre, and as of November 2022, has 67 patients in care. Out of these, only two have active leprosy. It was also known as Asylum for Homeless Lepers.

It started with 50 beds as Homeless Leper Asylum on 7 November 1890, and was funded by the city's philanthropists and then municipal commissioner Harry Arbuthnot Acworth. It was later renamed as Acworth Leper Asylum in 1904. The hospital was developed in the premises of Matunga Artillery Centre which were vacated in 1885. By 1957, the hospital had 500 beds. In 1970, the hospital staff started the Acworth Leprosy Hospital Society for Research, Rehabilitation, and Education in Leprosy (ALH-RRE) to commemorate the hospital's 80th anniversary. It is currently run by the Brihanmumbai Municipal Corporation, which restored it in March 2023.

The hospital premises also houses the Acworth Leprosy Museum, one of the only five in Asia. It was inaugurated on 5 February 2003.

== Gallery ==
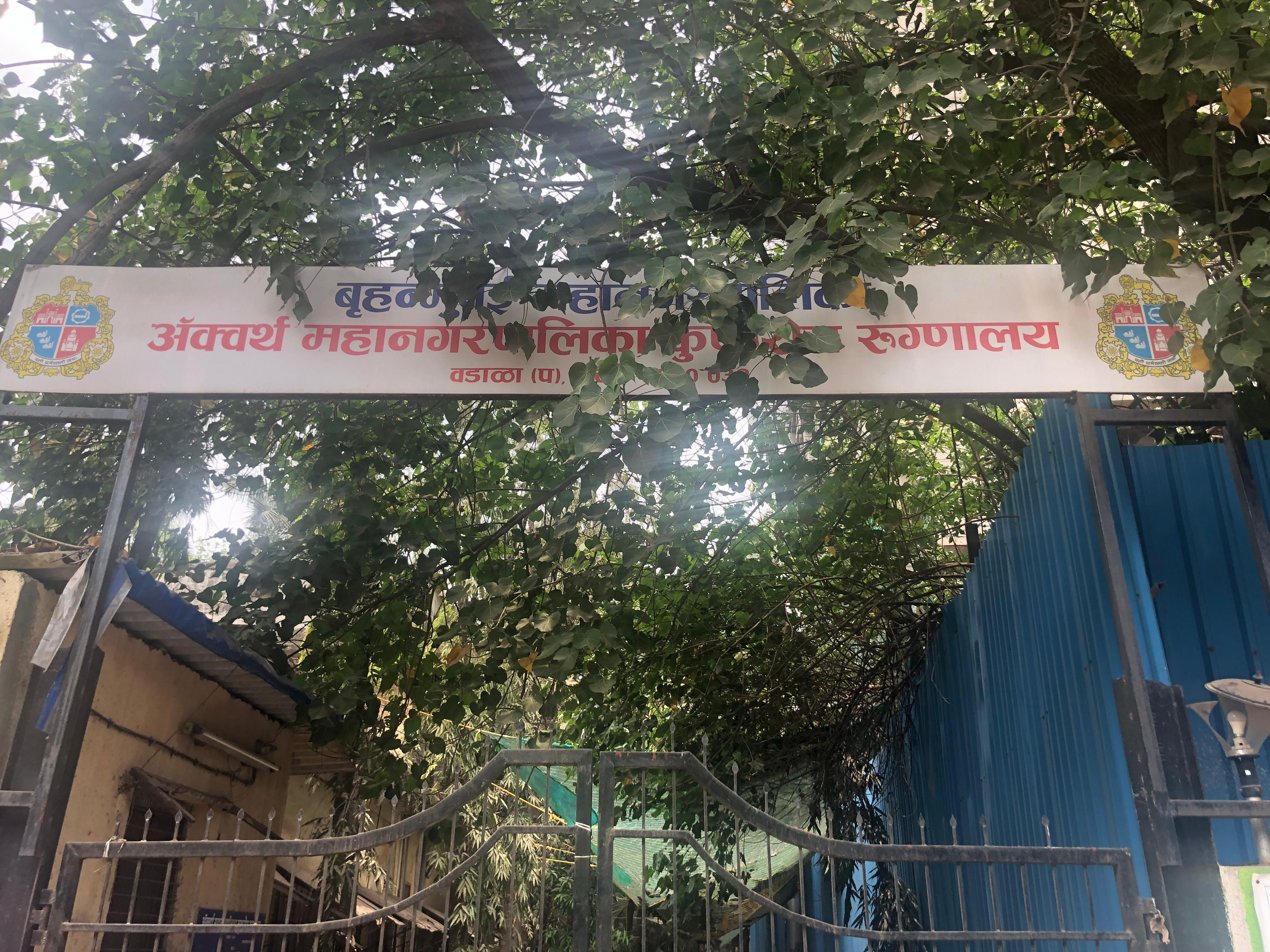
Main entrance

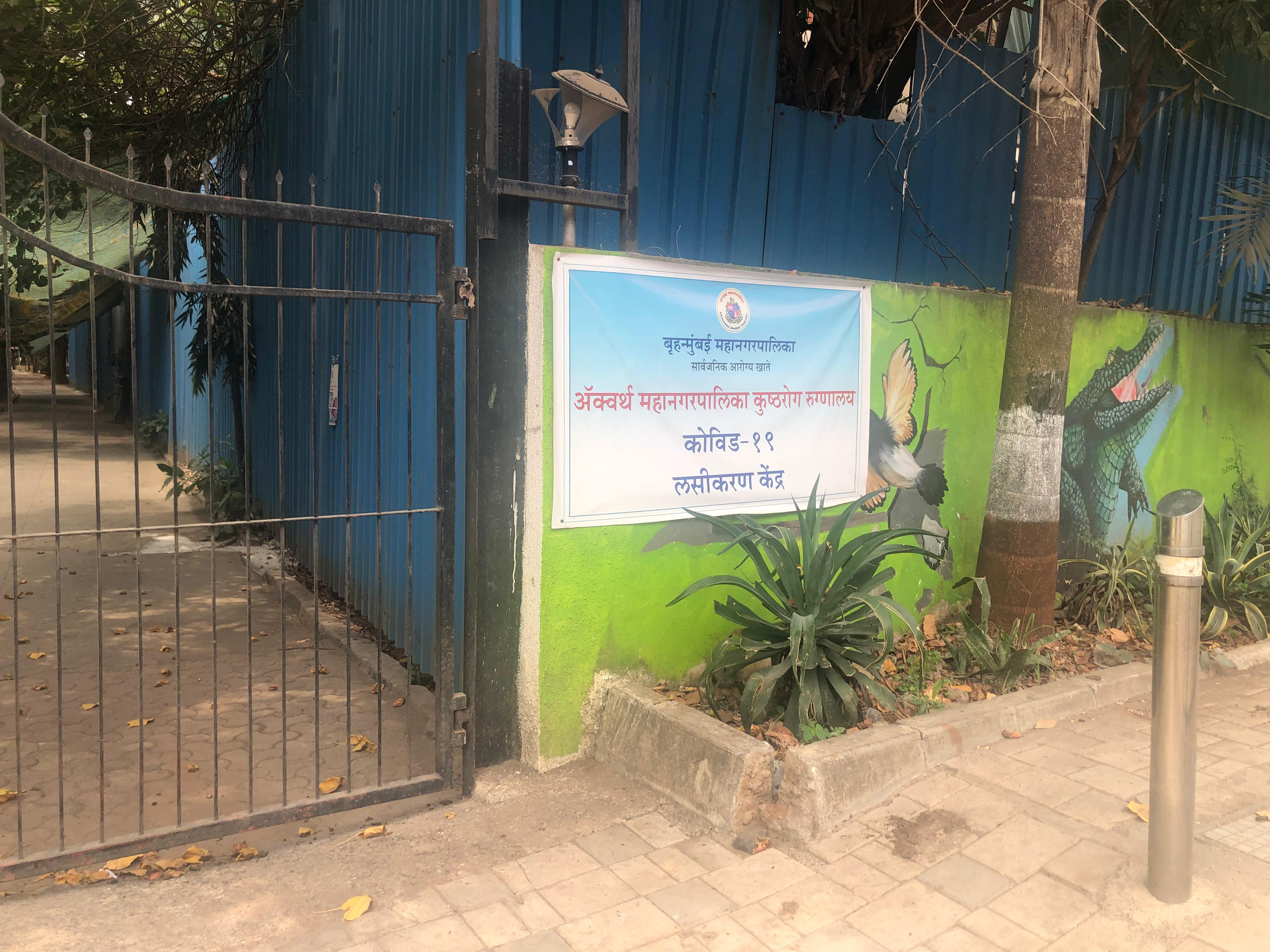
A gate of the hospital
