= Santokba Durlabhji Memorial hospital =

- Location within Jaipur Location within Rajasthan Location within India

Geography
- Location: Jaipur, Rajasthan, India
- Coordinates: 26.893678°N 75.812472°E

Services
- Beds: 551

History
- Opened: 1971

Links
- Website: www.sdmh.in
- Lists: Hospitals in India

Santokba Durlabhji Memorial Hospital is a hospital in Jaipur city of Rajasthan state in India. The hospital was inaugurated by the then prime minister of India Late Smt. Indira Gandhi in 1971 and was then the first private hospital of State. It is a trust-managed, autonomous, fee-for-services and not-for-profit hospital. Padmashri Khailshankar Durlabhji a businessperson and a renowned emerald exporter was the founder of the hospital. It is a multidisciplinary, 551-bed, tertiary care hospital. It houses several wards, operation theatres, ICUs, laboratories, utility services, specialties and super specialties, including one of the best blood banks in the country, catering to the entire state of Rajasthan.
