= Bidhannagar Sub-Divisional Hospital =

Bidhannagar Sub-Divitional Hospital
- Government of West Bengal

Geography
- Location: Salt Lake, West Bengal, India
- Coordinates: 22°35′28.20″N 88°24′32.01″E

Organisation
- Type: General

Services
- Beds: 200

History
- Founded: 14 November 1980; 45 years ago

Links
- Lists: Hospitals in India

Bidhannagar Sub-Divisional Hospital is a government hospital in Bidhannagar, Kolkata, India.

== Location ==
The Bidhannagar Sub-Divisional Hospital is located in Salt Lake City, DD Block, Sector I, Kolkata – 700064. This government hospital is situated opposite of SBR Technologies office and beside Seba Hospital, near City Centre, Salt Lake.

== Year Established ==
The former Chief Minister of West Bengal, Jyoti Basu transformed this health facility, which was established on 14 November 1980, into a state-run hospital on 27 February 1991.

== Facilities ==
Number of Beds: According to sources, there are 100 beds in this health facility. For residents living in the extended areas of the Bidhannagar township such as Naobhanga, Sukantanagar, and Mahishbatan - this is the only option for an affordable treatment for the common masses. Even patients from far-flung places like Bashirhat, Sunderbans and Sashan opt for this hospital for emergency situations like accidents. There is an operation theatre available in the hospital. There are 2 air-conditioned VIP rooms also available.

According to doctors attached to the hospital, they have to handle accident cases almost daily in the morning. The Rajarhat and New Town road being in the vicinity, people end up with severe accidents and injuries due to reckless driving. Most of the patients are first brought to the Bidhannagar Sub-divisional hospital owing to its closeness to Rajarhat and New Town.

Transfusion Facilities: The Bidhannagar Sub-Divisional Hospital now has transfusion facilities for Thalassemia patients of the city. The West Bengal state health department can now accommodate these patients. The hospital provides an in-patient unit for people suffering from Thalassemia. Though this is a 100-bed facility, it can easily accommodate 30-40 patients (for blood transfusion) suffering from this ailment.

This is an initiative to benefit patients so that unused space in the hospital can be utilized for a good purpose.
