= Rajiv Gandhi Government Women and Children's Hospital =

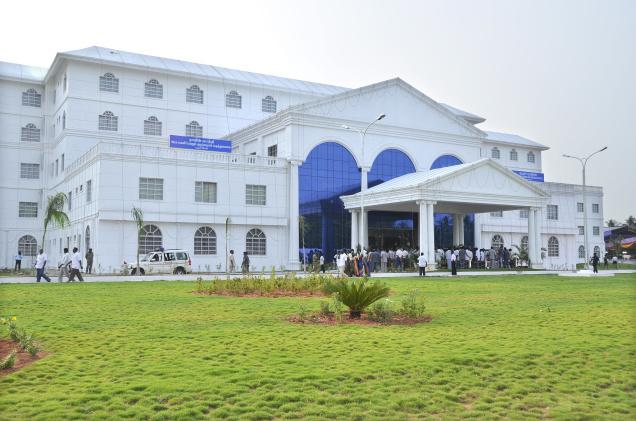
- Rajiv Gandhi Government Women and Children Hospital inaugurated by UPA Chairperson Sonia Gandhi in Puducherry.

Geography
- Location: Iyyanar Koil St, Aruthra Nagar, Pondicherry, Union territory of Puducherry, India
- Coordinates: 11.937827°N 79.806948°E

Organisation
- Type: Specialist

Services
- Speciality: Women and children's hospital

Links
- Lists: Hospitals in India

Rajiv Gandhi Women and Children's Hospital is a hospital in Pondicherry, the capital of the Union territory of Puducherry, India. The building is over 300 years old. In 2017, a proposal was made to increase the number of beds from 430 to 700. In 2019, there were 1,104 members of staff (including 32 specialists, 291 nurses and 158 ward attenders).
