= Little Flower Hospital =

Little Flower Hospital and Research Centre
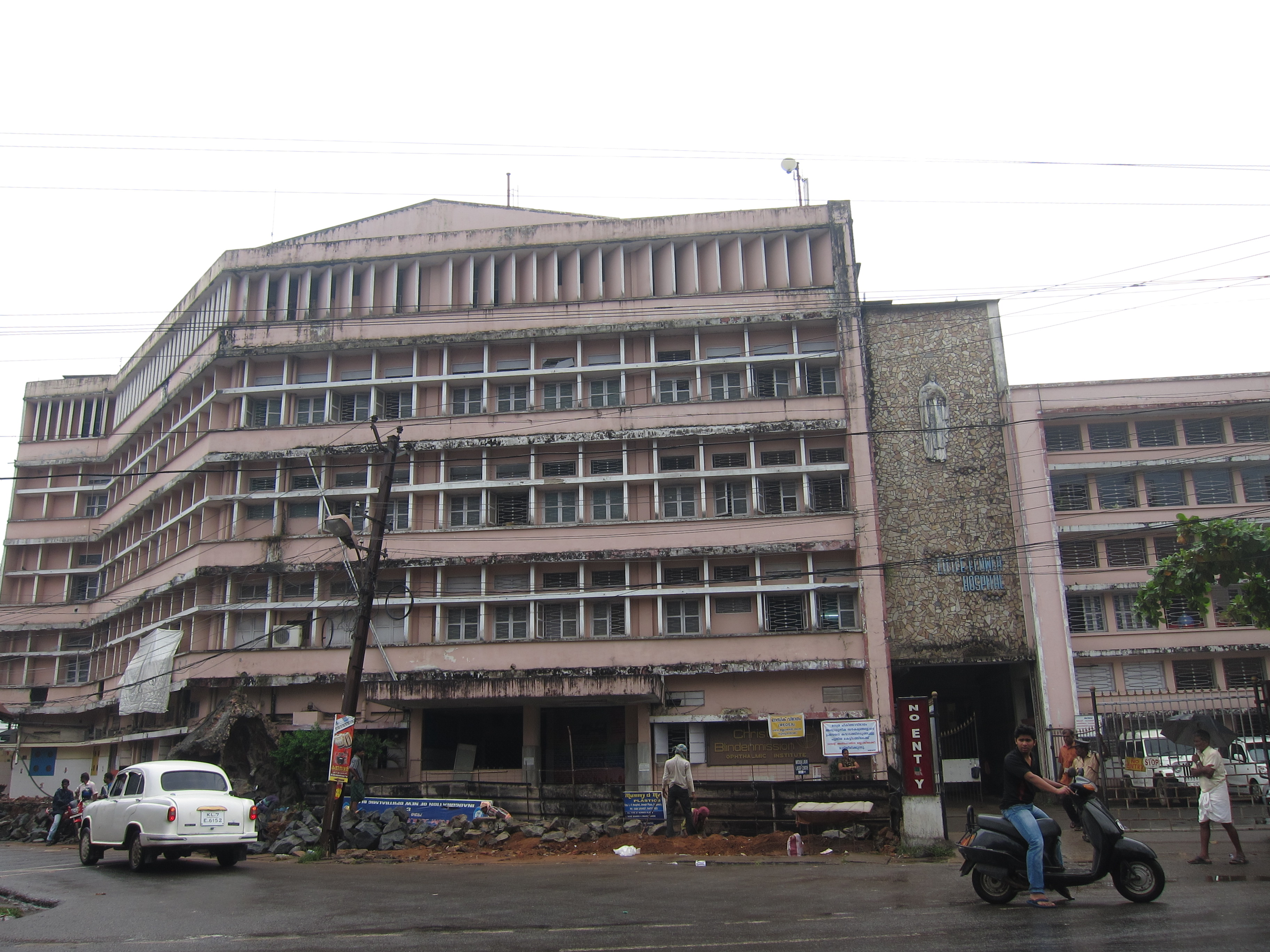
- Angamali – Little Flower Hospital

Geography
- Location: Angamaly, Kochi – 683572, Kerala, India
- Coordinates: 10.1908°N 76.3894°E

Services
- Emergency department: Yes
- Beds: 950

History
- Opened: 1936; 89 years ago

Links
- Website: lfhospital.org
- Lists: Hospitals in India

Little Flower Hospital & Research Centre is a 690-bed multi-specialty hospital in Kerala, India. It is in the town of Angamaly, Eranakulam District, about 25 kilometres north of Kochi, situated at the junction of the Main Central Road of Kerala with the National Highway 47.

The hospital was opened in 1936 under the management of the Archdiocese of Ernakulam. It is run by the Major Archdiocese of Ernakulam-Angamaly of the Syro-Malabar Catholic Church.

In 2002, the hospital opened a nursing school; it is affiliated to the Kerala University of Health Sciences.
