= General Hospital Ernakulam =

General Hospital, Ernakulam
- Health and Family Welfare Department, Government of Kerala

Geography
- Location: Kochi, Kerala, India

Organisation
- Type: General
- Affiliated university: National Accreditation Board for Hospitals & Healthcare Providers

Links
- Website: generalhospitalernakulam.in
- Lists: Hospitals in India

General Hospital Ernakulam is a state-owned hospital providing super-speciality training and treatment in cardiology, cardiothoracic and vascular surgery (CTVS), nephrology and urology, along with internal medicine and general surgery, in Kochi, India. It is managed as part of the public health system of the Government of Kerala.
