= Renai Medicity =

Geography
- Location: Palarivattom, Kochi, India

Services
- Emergency department: Yes
- Beds: 500

Links
- Lists: Hospitals in India

Renai Medicity is a multi super-speciality Hospital in Kochi, Kerala, built in memory of founder late Polakulath Narayanan. The hospital is situated on 1.2 hectares (3 acres) of land adjacent to NH 544, between Palarivattom and Edapally.

== Overview ==
Renai Medicity is managed by Polakulath Group of Hotels, Resorts & Healthcare. The hospital is located at the heart of Kochi. The hospital has an in-patient capacity of 500 beds and has 24 hour Accident & Emergency care facilities. The nearest airport is Cochin International Airport, 25 kilometres (15 1/2 miles) from the hospital by road. The Vytilla mobility hub is 6 kilometres (3 3/4 miles) away and can be accessed through NH 544. The nearest railway station, Edappally is 2 kilometres (1 1/4 miles) away and the Kochi metro has a station just 50 metres (55 yards) away.

== Facilities ==
The hospital has 500 beds and has centrally air conditioned rooms. Renai Medicity has a 24x7 Accident & Emergency care unit that can handle any emergency, the first of its kind in Kerala. It has 15 operation theaters including Hybrid OT’s for cardiothoracic surgeries and 11 separate Intensive Care Units with 120 beds. It houses more than 35 specialty and super specialty departments, multiple Cath Labs, a chest pain centre, modern radiological equipment, 24 Hour Pharmacies and clinical laboratories, suites and wards, multiple restaurants, ample car parking facilities and more.

The core departments include anesthesia and critical care, cardiology, endocrinology, oncology, gastroenterology, dental sciences, ayurveda, dermatology & cosmetology, neonatology, nephrology, neurosurgery, orthopaedics, psychiatry, plastic surgery, palliative care and urology.
