= Suri Sadar Hospital =

Suri Sadar Hospital সিউড়ি সদর হাসপাতাল
- Government of West Bengal
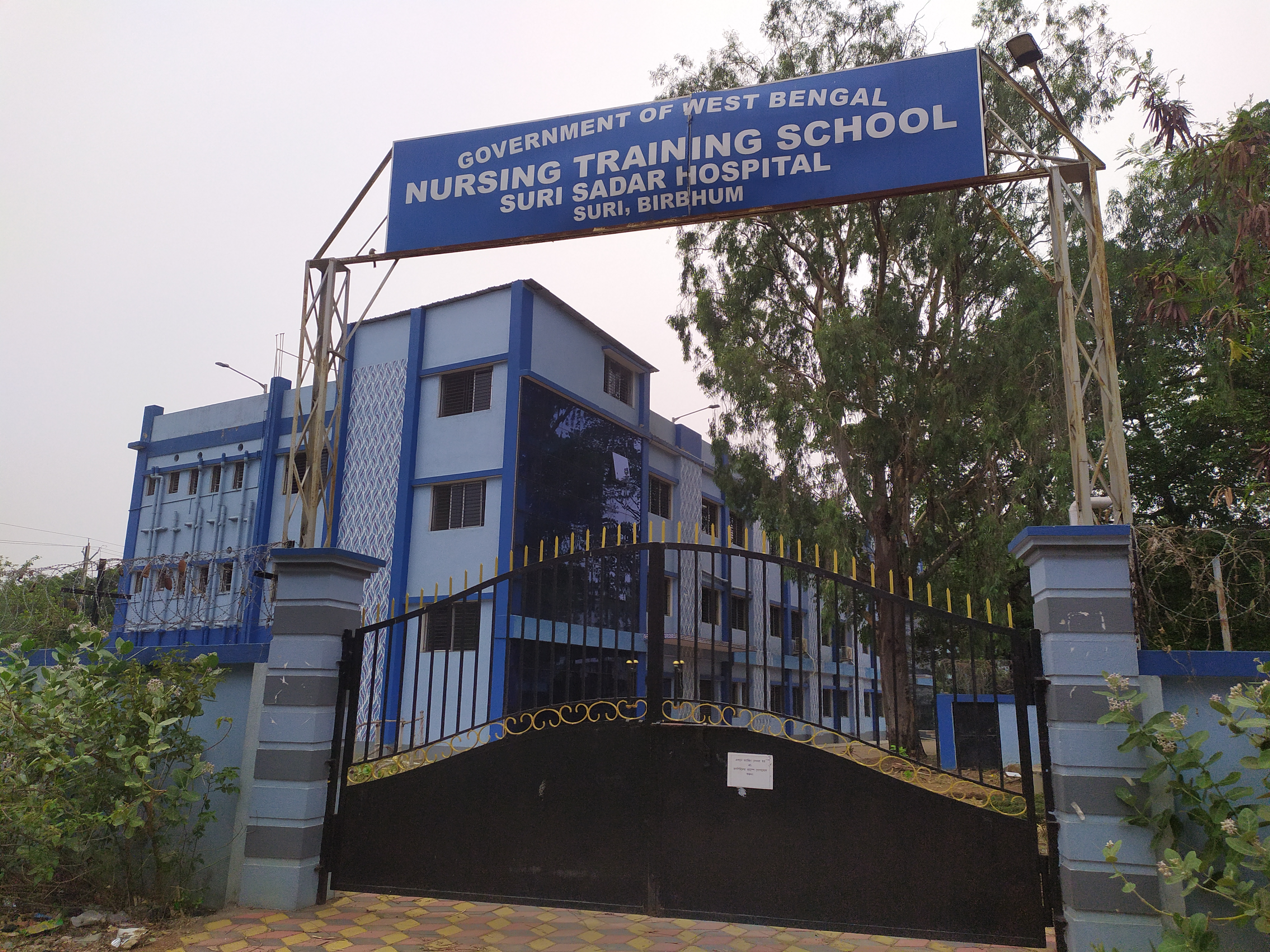
- Nursing Training School, Suri Sadar Hospital

Geography
- Location: Suri Sadar Hospital Road, Sabuj Pally, Suri, Birbhum District, West Bengal, India
- Coordinates: 23.915044°N 87.518443°E

Organisation
- Type: District Hospital

Services
- Standards: Super Speciality Hospital
- Emergency department: Yes
- Beds: 520

Links
- Website: www.birbhum.gov.in www.wbhealth.gov.in
- Lists: Hospitals in India

Suri Sadar Hospital is a district hospital situated at Suri, the District Headquarters of Birbhum district, India. It is also one of the three super-specialty hospitals built in Birbhum district. Apart from people of Suri, people of neighbouring villages and towns (such as, Rajnagar, Mohammad Bazar, Purandarpur, Sainthia etc.) and even the people of neighbouring state Jharkhand also depend on this hospital.

The total number of beds in this hospital is 520. During the 2020 COVID-19 pandemic, a coronavirus testing laboratory was established at the Suri Sadar Hospital.
