= Shree Saibaba Heart Institute And Research Centre =

Geography
- Location: Near Kalidas Kala Mandir, Shalimar, Nashik, Maharashtra, India

Links
- Website: http://www.shreesaibabaheartinstitute.com/
- Lists: Hospitals in India

Shree Saibaba Heart Institute and Research Centre (SSHIRC) is a cardiology and multi-specialty hospital in Mumbai Naka, Nashik, Maharashtra, India. It was established in 2009. SSHIRC provides comprehensive cardiac services including interventional cardiology, cardiothoracic surgery, critical care, and advanced cardiac imaging, and also operates a multispecialty unit near Mumbai Naka in Nashik.
