= Metro Hospital =

Private Hospital in India

Metro Group of Hospital

Geography
- Location: Sector-12, Noida, U.P, India
- Coordinates: 28.228839°N 77.322616°E

Organisation
- Type: Healthcare

Services
- Beds: 2500

History
- Opened: 1997

Links
- Website: www.metrohospitals.com
- Lists: Hospitals in India

Metro Group of Hospitals is an Indian hospital network with 10 NABH and 4 NABL accredited hospitals operational across India. With 2,500 beds, the hospital network is the largest tertiary care provider in the region.

== History ==
The hospital system was founded in 1997 by Purshotam Lal, an Indian cardiologist.

== Hospitals in the Network ==
- Metro Hospitals & Heart Institute, Noida-12, UP
- Metro Hospitals & Heart Institute, Sector-11, UP
- Metro Hospital & Cancer Institute, Preet Vihar, Delhi
- RLKC Metro Hospital & Heart Institute, Pandav Nagar, Delhi
- Metro Heart Institute & Multispecialty, Faridabad, Delhi NCR
- Metro Hospital & Heart Institute, Haridwar, Uttarakhand
- Metro MAS Hospital, Jaipur, Rajasthan
- Metro Hospital & Heart Institute, Meerut, UP
- Metro Hospital & Heart Institute, Rewari, Haryana
- Metro Hospital & Research Institute, Vadodara, Gujarat
- Metro Cancer Institute, Faridabad, Delhi/NCR
