= Joshi Hospital =

- shown in Pune, Maharashtra

Geography
- Location: Pune, Maharashtra, India
- Coordinates: 18.5334°N 73.8772°E

Links
- Lists: Hospitals in India

Joshi Hospital is a large state-run hospital in Pune, India. The hospital was founded in 1950 by Dr. L. B. Joshi, a surgeon in Pune. In 1978, he donated the hospital to Maharashtra Medical Foundation and since then, the foundation has operated the facility.

The hospital offers many modern facilities under one roof including general, laparoscopic, Oncological, hand, gastroenterology surgery. The hospital has more than 100 beds.
