= Mathura Das Mathur Hospital =

- Rajasthan Government

Geography
- Location: Jodhpur, Rajasthan, India
- Coordinates: 26.266188°N 73.009125°E

Services
- Emergency department: Yes

History
- Construction started: 1974
- Opened: 1979

Links
- Lists: Hospitals in India

Mathura Das Mathur Hospital is a public hospital in Jodhpur, Rajasthan, India. This hospital is run by the Government of Rajasthan.

== History ==
The foundation stone of this hospital was laid in 1974 by the then Chief Minister Shri Harideo Joshi, and was inaugurated in 1979 with a capacity of 200 beds. The departments working in this hospital are Cardiology, Neurosurgery, Radiotherapy, Urology, Ophthalmology, Dermatology, ENT, Orthopedics, Radiology, and Forensic Medicine. This hospital also has a trauma center.

== See also ==
- Healthcare in India
