= CHL Indore =

Hospital in Madhya Pradesh, India

CHL Hospitals

Geography
- Location: Indore, Madhya Pradesh, India
- Coordinates: 22.732°N 75.889°E

Organisation
- Type: Private
- Patron: Rajesh Bhargava, N.C. Maru
- Network: NABH, NABL

Services
- Beds: 225

Links
- Website: http://www.chlhospitals.com
- Lists: Hospitals in India

Convenient Hospitals Ltd. (CHL) Hospital, Indore is a hospital in Indore, India.

CHL is managed and owned by Convenient Hospitals Ltd (CHL Group), Indore. Now it has been acquired by Hyderabad-based Care Group hospital. The deal was valued at ₹350-400 crore. The facility is a 225-bed multi-specialty critical care hospital located on A.B Road.
