= Sunrise Hospital Kochi =

Sunrise Hospital

Geography
- Location: Kakkanad, Kochi, India

Organisation
- Care system: Tertiary
- Type: Multi-specialty

Services
- Emergency department: Yes
- Beds: 250

History
- Founded: 2005

Links
- Website: http://sunrisehospitalcochin.com/
- Lists: Hospitals in India

Sunrise Hospital is a tertiary care multi-speciality hospital and prominent laparoscopic center in the city Kochi in the South Indian state of Kerala. It was established in 2005, by Dr. Hafeez Rahman, the Chairman of Sunrise Group of Hospitals. Sunrise Group of Hospitals have branches in United Arab Emirates and India provides consultations.

== Overview ==
The hospital is about 23 km from Cochin international Airport, located in Kakkanad and is accessible through the Seaport-Airport Road. The hospital complex is spread over 1.5 acres with a built-up area of 100,000 sq.ft. Sunrise Hospital has 40 medical departments and specialties with shoulder & upper limb surgery, reproductive medicine, gastroenterology, pulmonology, cardiovascular surgery, autism treatment and other developmental disorders, gynaecology & obstetrics, urology, obesity & diabetic surgery and plastic surgery etc.
