= District Hospital, Agra =

Geography
- Location: Mahatma Gandhi Rd, Chhipitola, Rakabganj, Agra,, Uttar Pradesh, India
- Coordinates: 27.170830°N 78.010424°E

Services
- Beds: 112

Links
- Lists: Hospitals in India

District Hospital, Agra is a government-run hospital in Agra, India, on Mahatma Gandhi Road. It serves the Agra district of the Uttar Pradesh state, India.

As of 2016, the hospital has 112 beds, including 100 general, 12 emergency and 6 private. The staff strength is 160, which includes 56 doctors, 44 paramedical personnel and 60 others. The doctors include 53 specialists.

It is recognised by the Medical Council of India under the Medical Council of India Act, 1956. The Lady Lyall (L.L.) Hospital in Agra is attached to District Hospital, Agra for Obstretrics and Gynecology departments.
