= Balaji Dental and Craniofacial Hospital =

- S. M. Balaji

Geography
- Location: Chennai, Tamil Nadu, India
- Coordinates: 13.0353845°N 80.2469639°E

Organisation
- Type: Specialist

Services
- Emergency department: Yes
- Beds: 25
- Speciality: Dental and surgical care

History
- Founded: 1993; 33 years ago

Links
- Website: www.smbalaji.com
- Lists: Hospitals in India

Balaji Dental and Craniofacial Hospital is a dental and surgical care center based in Chennai, Tamil Nadu, India. S. M. Balaji founded it in 1993.

== Achievements ==
- An 18-month-old Pakistani toddler from Karachi with a ‘congenital mid-facial, bilateral cleft deformity'.
- Two-year-old Chayce Lee (from Singapore) was born with a rare autosomal recessive genetic disorder called Pierre-Robin syndrome.
