= The Mission Hospital, Durgapur =

Hospital in Durgapur, India mission

The Mission Hospital দি মিশন‌ হাসপাতাল
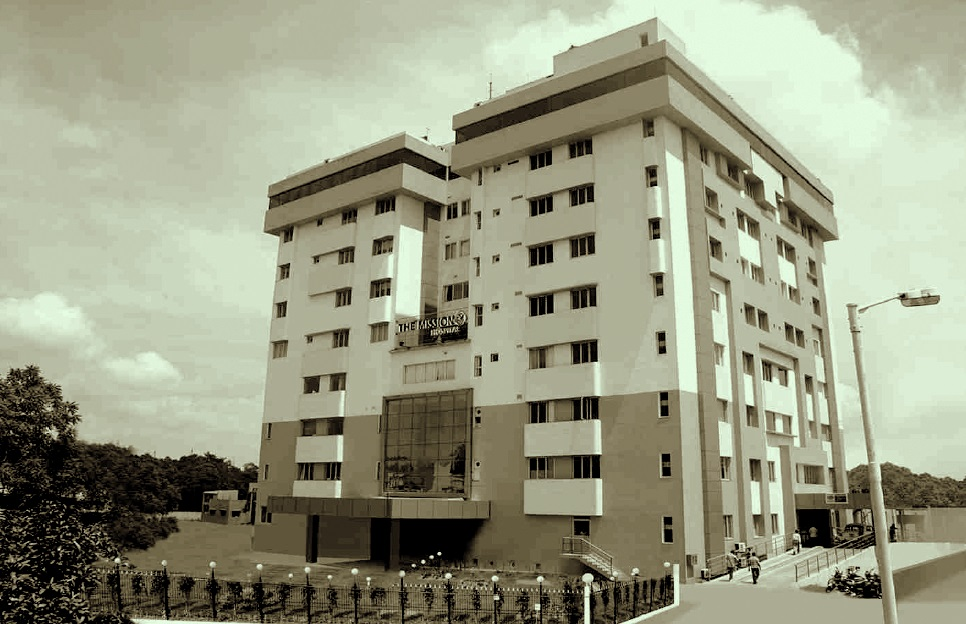
- Type: Private
- Industry: Healthcare
- Founded: 2 April 2008; 18 years ago
- Headquarters: Durgapur, West Bengal, India
- Key people: Dr. Satyajit Bose (Founder & Chairman)
- Number of employees: 2500
- Website: themissionhospital.com

The Mission Hospital (A Unit of Durgapur Medical Centre Pvt. Ltd.) is a 550-bed super-specialty hospital located in Durgapur, West Bengal, India. Built in an area spanning three acres, it has an array of facilities:

- A digital flat panel Cath lab
- Seven major operation theaters
- State of the art critical care units
- A mother and child care unit
- A 24-hour accident and emergency department
- Blood bank
- A computer-controlled Sumetzberger hospital pneumatic tube system.

The Mission Hospital started its operation on April 2, 2008. This is the first specialty corporate hospital in Eastern India outside Kolkata.

== Services and departments ==
The Mission Hospital has the following departments:

Accident & Emergency Medicine, Anesthesiology, Cardiology, Pediatric Cardiology, Cardio Thoracic & Vascular Surgery, Critical Care, Dentistry, Dermatology, Endocrinology, ENT, Gastroenterology & Gastrointestinal Surgery, General & Laparoscopic Surgery, General Medicine, Institute Of Laboratory Medicine & Research, Nephrology, Neurology & Neuro Surgery, Obstetrics & Gynecology, Ophthalmology, Orthopedics & Spine Surgery, Pediatrics & Neonatology, Plastic & Reconstructive Surgery, Psychiatry, Pulmonology/Respiratory Medicine, Radio-Diagnosis & Imaging Sciences, Transfusion Medicine, Urology & The Department of Physical Therapy and Rehabilitation.

== Awards ==
In 2022, Dr Satyajit Bose, the founder of the hospital received the Times Lifetime Achievement Award for immense contribution in the field of cardiology and cardiac surgery.

== See also ==
- List of hospitals in India
