= Rama Sofat Hospital =

Dr. Rama Sofat Hospital

Geography
- Location: Ludhiana, Punjab, Punjab, India
- Coordinates: 30.90884°N 75.82869°E

Organisation
- Care system: Private
- Type: Infertility Treatment Hospital

Services
- Emergency department: Gynecology, Obstetrics, infertility, laparoscopy, hysteroscopy, advanced gynae cancer surgeries, maternity including high risk pregnancy management services

History
- Opened: 1972

Links
- Website: http://www.ramasofathospital.com/
- Lists: Hospitals in India

Dr. Rama Sofat Hospital is an infertility hospital in the Ludhiana city of the Indian state of Punjab. It is affiliated with the Indian Medical Association. The hospital was established in 1972 with a 10-bed capacity which later expanded. It was the first hospital in Northern India to provide all the infertility-related treatments.

== History ==
The hospital was established by Dr. Rama Sofat in 1972, offering better facilities and making patients aware of the options for the treatment of infertility, particularly in the lesser-educated and rural areas of Punjab.

== Facilities ==
- Infertility
- Endoscopy
- Male Sexual Dysfunction
- Recurrent Pregnancy Lost
- Aesthetic Gynaecology
- Urogynaecology
- Gynea Cancer Clinic
- Maternity
- Menopausal Clinic
- Paediatric
- Radiology
- Dentistry

== See also ==
- Healthcare in India
