= Cancer Hospital & Research Institute, Gwalior =

Hospital in India

Geography
- Location: Gwalior, Madhya Pradesh, India
- Coordinates: 26.184254°N 78.1642224°E

Organisation
- Type: Specialist

Services
- Speciality: Oncology

Links
- Website: cancerhospitalgwalior.com
- Lists: Hospitals in India

Cancer Hospital & Research Institute is a Regional Cancer Centre funded by the Government of India in Gwalior. The institution was founded as a medical college department affiliated to the Jiwaji University of Gwalior.
