= Dr. Mohan's Diabetes Specialities Centre =

Indian diabetes speciality hospital chain

Dr. Mohan’s Diabetes Specialities Centre
- Dr. Mohan's Group

Geography
- Location: Chennai, Tamil Nadu, India

Organisation
- Type: Specialist

Services
- Speciality: Diabetes

History
- Founded: 1991

Links
- Website: www.drmohans.com
- Lists: Hospitals in India

Dr. Mohan's Diabetes Specialities Centre is a diabetes speciality hospital chain that is headquartered in Chennai, Tamil Nadu. It was founded in 1991 by V. Mohan along with his wife Rema. Dr. Mohan's Group has 50 centres and more than 4000 staff members. Dr. Mohan's Diabetes Specialities Centre is also the collaboration centre for World Health Organization on Non-Communicable Diseases Prevention and Control. In 2017, the centre raised $10.3 million in Series funding. This is the first round of funding for the centre since its founding in 1991. The money will be allocated to Dr. Mohan's Diabetes Specialties Centre across India.

== Founder ==
V. Mohan was born on April 10, 1954 in a small town in northern Kerala state (India). He worked with his father M. Viswanathan as a Diabetologist and a researcher until 1990 at MV Hospital and Diabetes Research Centre, Chennai.

== Branches ==
Dr. Mohan's Diabetes Specialities Centre has 50 diabetes centres and clinics in India viz. 8 centres in Chennai, 8 centres in Telangana, 10 centres in Andhra Pradesh, 5 centres in Karnataka 2 centres in Kerala 2 centres in West Bengal and 1 each in Coimbatore, Madurai, Pondicherry, Chunampet, Vellore, Gudiyatham, Trichy, Thanjavur, Erode, Salem, Tuticorin, Tirupur, Kanchipuram, Dindigul and Bhubaneswar.

== Achievements and awards ==
- Dr. Mohan's Diabetes Specialities Centre was awarded Best Diabetes Endocrine Hospital in India for at the CNBC-TV18 Health Care Awards in 2013.
- Dr. Mohan's Diabetes Specialities Centre was the first diabetes centre in India to offer Bariatric surgery.
