= Ford Hospital and Research Centre =

Coordinates: 25.5844°N 85.1630°E

Ford Hospital and Research Centre Pvt. Ltd.

Geography
- Location: Patna, Bihar, India, Patna, Bihar, India

Organisation
- Type: Private Hospital
- Affiliated university: NABH ACCREDITED

Services
- Beds: 105

History
- Founded: 2008

Links
- Website: http://www.fordhospital.org

Ford Hospital and Research Centre (FHRC) was established in Patna, Bihar, India in Year 2008 and officially inaugurated by Chief Minister of Bihar Shri Nitish Kumar on 24 August 2010, with the sole objective of providing advance healthcare services to the people of Bihar. The first phase of the hospital was commissioned on 24 August 2010 with 60 beds. The hospital has now expanded to 105 beds and is the one among the largest private hospital of Bihar.

== Infrastructure ==
The hospital provides diagnostic facilities and complete treatment, surgery, rehabilitation and Cardiac care under one roof. Most diagnostic and therapeutic procedures are available here.

The department of radiology and imaging offers facilities for CT scans, mammography, ultrasonography, echocardiography, endoscopies, digital radiography, CT and ultrasound-guided procedures.

== Departments ==
The main departments at Ford Hospital are:

- Cardiology
- Gastroenterology
- Neurology
- Urology
- Orthopedics
- ENT
- Pediatrics
- Gynecology
- Internal Medicine
- Dermatology
- Dental
- Diabetology
- Endocrinology
- Nephrology
- Ophthalmology
- Plastic Surgery
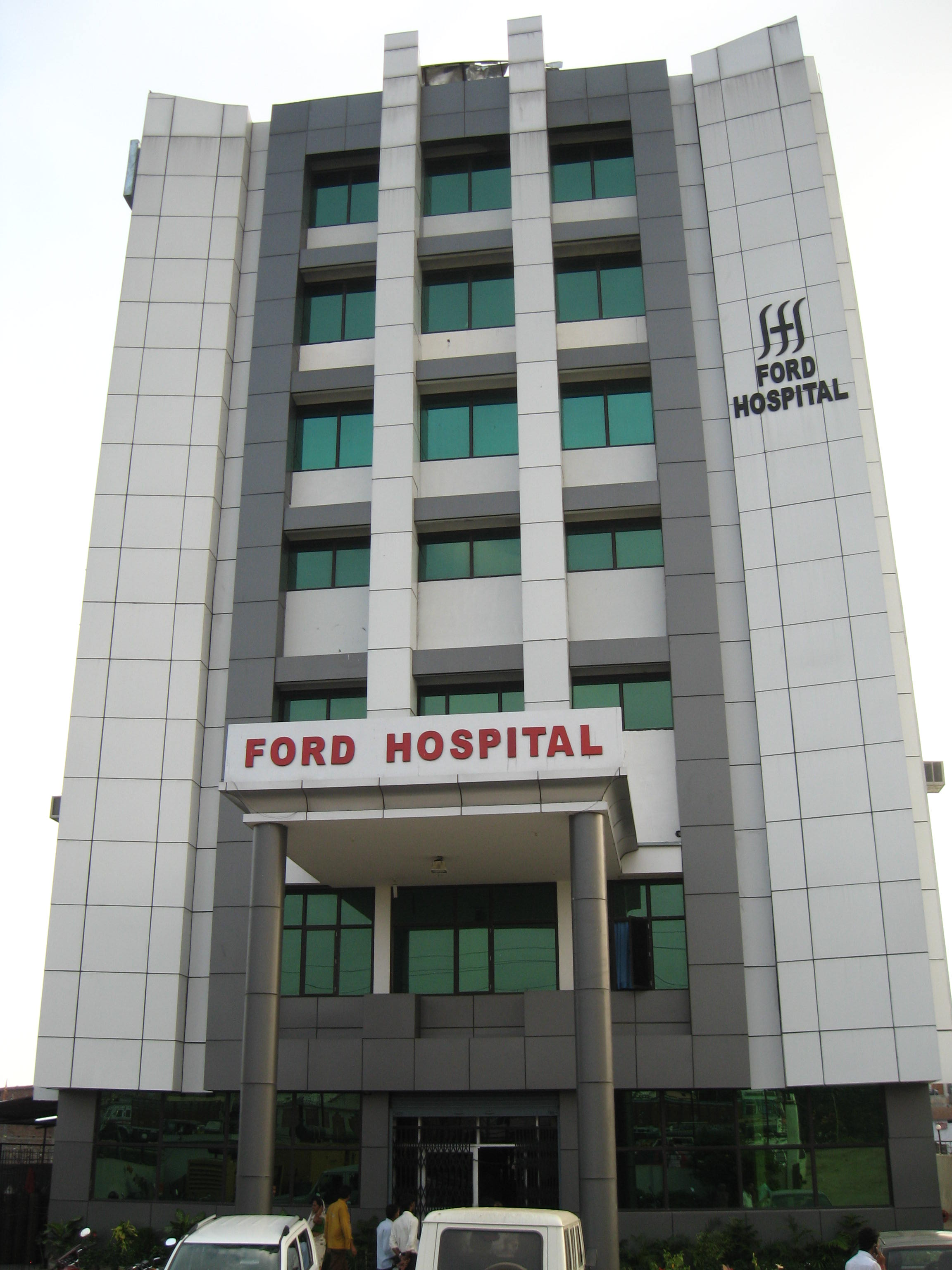
- Ford Hospital, Patna
  Pain Clinic
- Pulmonology
- Occupational Therapy
- Surgical Oncology
- Radiology & Imaging
- Pathology & Blood Bank
- Anesthesiology and ICU
- Allied Services
- Medical Records
- Physiotherapy

== See also ==
- List of hospitals in India
