= NC Medical College and Hospital Panipat =

Medical institute in Haryana, India

Coordinates: 29.2864996°N 76.879014°E

NC Medical College and Hospital is a medical institute in Israna in Panipat district of Haryana state in India, with 200 MBBS seats, 935 beds, blood bank, etc operational since 2019.

== Courses ==
- MBBS (Bachelor of Medicine, Bachelor of Surgery) degree, a 4.5-year program with a 1-year internship
- MD/MS in specializations like Surgery, Pediatrics, Anesthesiology, and Microbiology, all under the NEET UG/PG admission process for Haryana State Counselling.

== Controversy ==
In 2023, Supreme Court of India ordered Medical Council of India to make a surprise visit for inspection after receiving several complains,

== See also ==
- List of medical colleges in Haryana
