= Sanjeevan Hospital =

Hospitals in delhi

Sanjeevan Hospitals
- Type: Private
- Location: 24, Ansari Road Darya Ganj, New Delhi-110002
- Website: sanjeevanhealthcare.com

Sanjeevan Hospital is a private hospital located in Daryaganj, New Delhi.

The hospital was founded by Dr. Prem Aggarwal, a cardiologist and specialist in critical care, along with a group of senior doctors from Maulana Azad Medical College in 1983. The hospital has more than 100 beds and 10 bedded ICU.

It bagged the NABH recognition in the year 2017 and is on the panel of Central Government Health Scheme (CGHS), Government of India and Delhi Government Employment Health Scheme (DGEHS)
