= Hardikar Hospital =

Geography
- Location: Pune, Maharashtra, India
- Coordinates: 18.530517°N 73.847100°E

Services
- Beds: 120

Links
- Website: deccanhospital.in
- Lists: Hospitals in India

Hardikar Hospital is a multi speciality hospital in Pune, Maharashtra, India. It has 120 beds, serves as a private institution, and has a medical school attached to it.
