= Rainbow Hospitals =

Healthcare organization in Hyderabad, India

- Type: Public
- Traded as: NSE: RAINBOW; BSE: 543524
- Industry: Healthcare
- Founded: 1999
- Founder: Ramesh Kancharla
- Headquarters: Hyderabad, Telangana, India
- Key people: Ramesh Kancharla (Chairman)
- Brands: Rainbow Children's Hospital; BirthRight by Rainbow Hospitals
- Services: Paediatric care; Neonatal care; Maternity healthcare; Women's healthcare; Fertility clinic; Outpatient clinic
- Website: rainbowhospitals.in

Rainbow Children's Medicare, commonly known as Rainbow Hospitals, is an Indian chain of paediatric hospitals headquartered in Hyderabad. Founded by Dr. Ramesh Kancharla in 1999, the hospital's main focus is paediatric and maternal healthcare services. The flagship facility of Rainbow Children's Hospitals is located at Banjara Hills, Hyderabad. The Rainbow Hospital Group currently operates out of 19 hospitals and 3 outpatient clinics – eight in Hyderabad, four in Bangalore, two each in Delhi, Chennai, Vijayawada, and Visakhapatnam.

== Awards ==
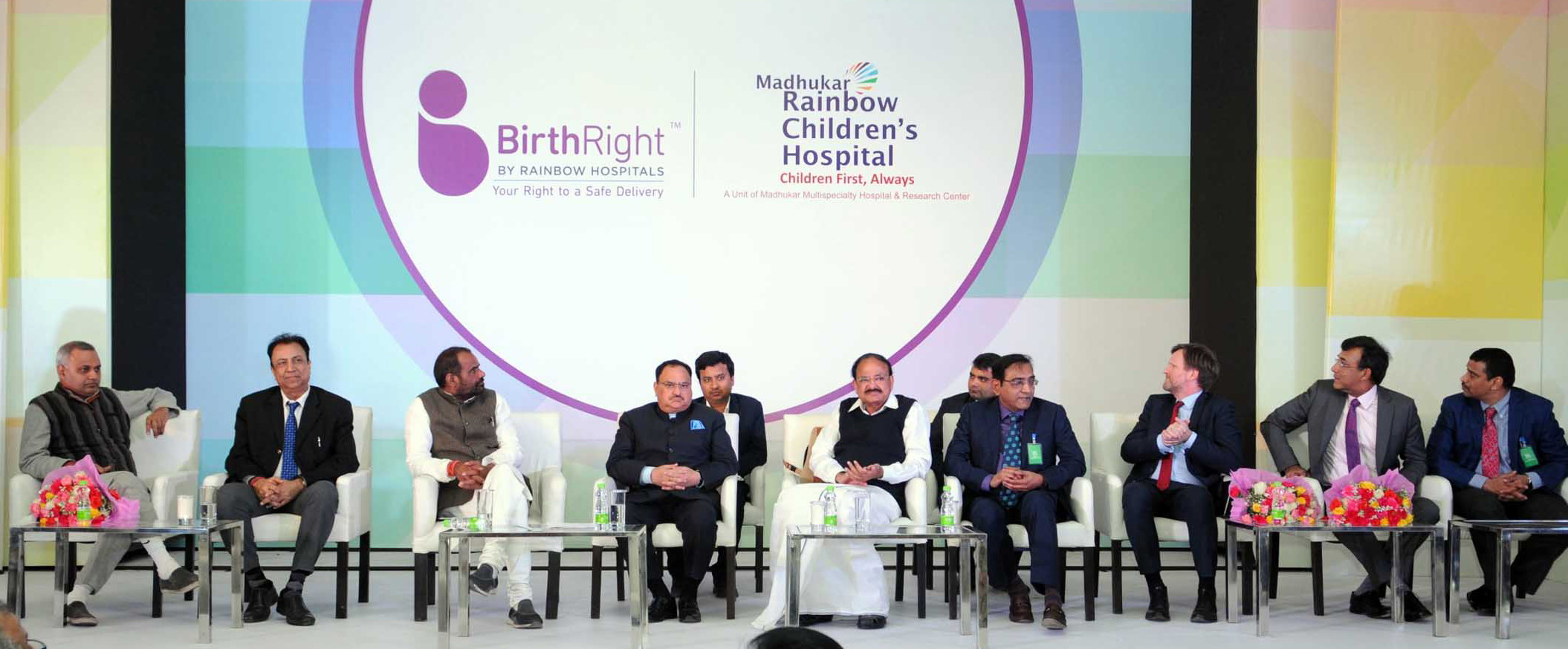
Inauguration of Rainbow Children's Hospital in Delhi in 2018.

- ICICI Lombard and CNBC-TV18 India Healthcare Award for Best Pediatric Hospital-2018
- VCCircle Awards 2016 - Best Healthcare company of the year 2016.
- VCCircle Awards 2015 - Best Hospital in Single Specialty services.

== Records ==
- Rainbow Hospitals sets the "Guinness World Record —for the largest gathering of people born prematurely under one roof" on World Prematurity Day held on 17 November 2016
- Rainbow Children's Hospital attains a place in 'Limca book of records - for saving a baby born with 375gms of birth weight.
