= GMERS Medical College and Hospital, Gandhinagar =

Medical college in Gandhinagar, Gujarat

- Type: Medical College and Hospital
- Established: 2012
- Affiliations: Gujarat University
- Location: Gandhinagar, Gujarat, India; 23°13′07″N 72°38′26″E
- Map: Map
- Website: http://www.gmersmchgandhinagar.com/

GMERS Medical College and Hospital, Gandhinagar is a medical college located in Gandhinagar, Gujarat. It was established in 2012. The college imparts the degree Bachelor of Medicine and Surgery (MBBS). Nursing and para-medical courses are also offered. The college is affiliated with Gujarat University. It is recognized by the National Medical Commission. The hospital associated with the college is one of the largest hospitals in the Gandhinagar. The selection to the college is made based on merit through National Eligibility and Entrance Test. Yearly undergraduate student intake is 200.

== Courses ==
GMERS Medical College and Hospital, Gandhinagar, undertakes education and training of students in MBBS courses. This college offers 200 MBBS seats from 2019, of which 85% of Seats are of state quota, and 15% are for Nation Counselling.
