= Rajawadi Hospital =

Hospital in Ghatkopar, India

Coordinates: 19.07951°N 72.901304°E

- Established: October 2, 1958; 67 years ago
- Location: Ghatkopar, Mumbai, India

The Rajawadi Hospital (opened on 2 October 1958) is a municipal hospital located in the Rajawadi area of Ghatkopar, Mumbai, India.

The hospital's official name is Seth V.C.Gandhi & M.A Vora Municipal General Hospital.

== History ==
The land on which Rajawadi Hospital sits belonged to the erstwhile Maharaja King Gaikwad of Baroda, which had been donated to him by his family members. The area was then referred to as Rajawadi. The land was later acquired by the Bombay Municipal Corporation in 1950 and initial planning of Rajawadi Hospital took place. In 1956, with the generous donation by the Gandhi and Vora family to the tune of Rs. 1,01,101/- and with the help of the local Municipal Corporation, a ground floor structure dispensary was constructed, which gave necessary health care to the poor and the needy of the area.

In 1957, due to the merger of the extended eastern suburbs up to Mulund into the Municipal Corporation limits, the dispensary was expanded by joining the S.V. Khimji Maternity Hospital at Rajawadi hospital into a 20-bed hospital. Later the hospital was expanded into a 50-bed hospital with facilities such which included an Operating Theatre, X-Ray Department and Pathology Departments. A plaque at the Operating Theatre recognises the donations from Seth V C Gandhi.

In 1969, the hospital added new departments, including Obstetrics, Gynaecology and a Pediatrics ward. The inauguration of a Casualty Department took place on 1 August 1973. Further major expansion of the hospital took place in 1976. At present Rajawadi Hospital is a major peripheral hospital in the Eastern suburbs of Mumbai, with a capacity of 596 beds.

== Present day ==
The Rajawadi Hospital operates 24 hours a day, 7 days a week and 365 days a year. The hospital boasts a well-equipped MICU/ICCU, Trauma Care Unit, C.T. Scan facilities, Blood Bank, Operating Theatres and Casualty departments.
