= MGM Medical College and Hospital, Aurangabad =

Indian medical college in Maharashtra

- एम जी एम वैद्यकीय महाविद्यालय एवं रूग्णालय
- Motto: In Pursuit of Excellence Education | Service | Research
- Type: Medical college and hospital
- Established: January 1990
- Affiliations: MGM University of Health Sciences, Navi Mumbai
- Chancellor: Kamalkishore Kadam
- Dean: Rajendra Bohra
- Director: Ajit G Shroff
- Location: N-6, CIDCO, Aurangabad, Maharashtra, India; 19.8777896°N 75.3519396°E
- Website: www.mgmmcha.org

MGM Medical College and Hospital, Aurangabad is a full-fledged medical college in Aurangabad, Maharashtra, India. The college imparts the degree Bachelor of Medicine and Bachelor of Surgery (MBBS). It is recognised by the National Medical Commission.

Selection to the college is done on the basis of merit through the National Eligibility and Entrance Test. Yearly undergraduate student intake is 150.
