= J L Rohatgi Memorial Eye Hospital =

Coordinates: 26°28′42″N 80°17′47″E

J L Rohatgi Memorial Eye Hospital is a big eye hospital and training institute for ophthalmology in kanpur, India.

The full name is Association For The Prevention of Blindness (U.P) and its unit Dr.Jawaharlal Rohatgi Memorial Eye Hospital. The Association for the prevention of blindness, U.P. was founded in Kanpur, (India) in 1946 with the mission to eradicate needless blindness in Uttar Pradesh. Subsequently an eye hospital was established in 1956 under the name of Kanpur Eye Hospital which was later changed to Dr Jawahar Lal Rohatgi Memorial Eye Hospital to carry on this work.

Now the hospital’s innovative eye care delivery system is recognized as a model for other developing Eye Hospitals. All patients are accorded the same care and level of service, regardless of their economic status, as a result of a unique fee system and management.

The Hospital follows the principle that large volume service result in low cost and self-sustainability and has the distinction of being a very productive eye care organization, in terms of surgical volume and the number of patients treated.

The eye hospital has now associated with it Dr. Rajendra Rohatgi institute of Ophthalmology and J L Rohatgi Hospital.
