= Devadoss Hospital =

Private Hospital in Madurai, India

Geography
- Location: Madurai, Tamil Nadu, India
- Coordinates: 9.95794°N 78.154117°E

Organisation
- Type: District General
- Patron: Dr. A. Devadoss

Services
- Emergency department: Yes
- Beds: 200

History
- Founded: 2007

Links
- Website: devadosshospitals.com
- Lists: Hospitals in India

Devadoss Hospital is a private hospital located in Madurai, Tamil Nadu, India. It was founded by orthopedist Prof. A. Devadoss. The hospital was inaugurated in 2007.

The hospital received substantial publicity in 2019 when a Nepal woman, acid attack survivor Bindabasini Kansakar, was admitted for treatment involving a face transplant. The hospital reconstructed her face by almost 90 per cent.

In 2023, laboratories run there started using first automated artificial joint surgery robot system in southern Tamil Nadu.

== History ==
The hospital was founded by Dr. A. Devadoss, an orthopedic surgeon to provide the multi-disciplinary healthcare in 2007.

The Government of Tamil Nadu and The Hindu recognized the hospital as one of the doyens of healthcare in Tamil Nadu. The award and recognition were given to managing director Dr. Hema Sathish and Dr. Sathish Devadoss.

== Hospital Facilities ==
Devadoss Hospital is a multispeciality hospital offering the following facilities:

- Total no. of beds: 200
- Non-ICU beds: 188
- ICU beds: 20

== Accreditations ==
Devadoss Hospital received certification from National Accreditation Board for Hospitals & Healthcare Providers, a constituent board of Quality Council of India, set up to establish and operate accreditation program for healthcare organizations.
