= Wockhardt Hospitals =

Indian hospital chain

- Company type: Private
- Industry: Healthcare
- Founded: 1989; 37 years ago
- Headquarters: Mumbai, Maharashtra, India
- Number of locations: 6
- Key people: Zahabiya Khorakiwala (MD)
- Revenue: ▼₹579 crore (US$60 million) (FY23)
- Operating income: ▼₹31 crore (US$3.2 million) (FY23)
- Net income: ▲₹−87 crore (US$−9.1 million) (FY23)
- Number of employees: 2,500+
- Website: www.wockhardthospitals.com

Wockhardt Hospitals Ltd is an Indian for-profit private hospital network headquartered in Mumbai. The chain of hospitals is owned by the promoters of Wockhardt, a multinational pharmaceutical company. It has six hospitals across four western Indian cities–Mumbai, Nagpur, Nashik and Rajkot.

== History ==
Wockhardt Hospitals started its first operations with a medical center in Kolkata in 1989 and a heart hospital in Bangalore two years later. The company was incorporated on 28 August 1991 under the Companies Act, 1956 as a public limited company, originally named First Hospitals and Heart Institute Limited. Wockhardt Hospitals were one of the early movers among corporate health-care chains in India.

On 11 September 2000, the name was changed to Wockhardt Health Sciences Limited and subsequently on 19 October 2000 the name was changed to Wockhardt Hospitals Limited.

In 2009, Wockhardt Hospitals sold 10 of its hospitals in Mumbai, Bangalore and Kolkata to Fortis Healthcare for ₹909 crore, which left it with seven multi speciality hospitals in Western India.

=== Timeline ===
- January 1990 Wockhardt Medical Centre, Kolkata
- March 1991 Wockhardt Hospital and Heart Institute, Bangalore
- July 1993 Wockhardt Hospital and Kidney Institute, Kolkata
- July 2002 Wockhardt Hospital, Mulund, Mumbai
- July 2004 Wockhardt Heart Hospital, Nagpur
- July 2005 Kamineni Wockhardt Hospital, Hyderabad
- January 2006 Wockhardt Hospital, Bannerghatta Road, Bangalore
- February 2006 Wockhardt Heart Centre, Hyderabad
- January 2007 N M Virani Wockhardt Hospital, Rajkot
- January 2007 Wockhardt Hospital, Chord Road, Bangalore
- April 2007 Sterling Wockhardt Hospital, Navi Mumbai
- June 2007 Wockhardt Hospital, Chord Road, Bangalore
- 2010 NUSI Wockhardt Hospitals, Goa
- 2014 Acquisition of Management and Operation of TUIMSAR, North Mumbai
- November 2014 New Age Wockhardt Hospitals, South Mumbai

== Associations ==
- Wockhardt-HMI HIV/AIDS Education and Research Foundation (WHARF) is a non-government organization established to provide training to healthcare professionals and counselors in India.
