= Medicover Hospitals =

Hospital chain

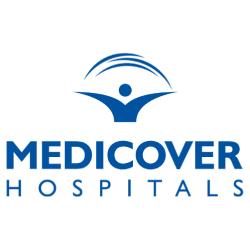
- Type: Private
- Industry: Healthcare
- Founded: 1995; 31 years ago
- Headquarters: Sweden
- Areas served: Poland, Germany, Romania, India, Bosnia and Herzegovina, Bulgaria, Croatia, Cyprus, Denmark, Georgia, Greece, Moldova, North Macedonia, Norway, Serbia, Sweden, Turkey, Ukraine
- Key people: John Stubbington (CEO and Interim COO); Dr. G. Anil Krishna (Chairman & Managing Director); Dr. Sharath Reddy (Executive Director); P. Hari Krishna (Executive Director); Anand Patel, CFO
- Products: Hospitals, pharmacy, diagnostic centres
- Website: www.medicover.com

Medicover Hospitals is a private healthcare services operating a network of medical facilities in Europe and India. It is part of the Medicover Group, an international healthcare and diagnostic services company operating in 18 countries.

The company's services include multispecialty hospitals, oncology centres, fertility clinics, and diagnostic laboratories.

On August 6 2026 KKR, a leading global investment firm announced the signing of definitive agreements under which funds managed by KKR (“KKR”) will acquire Medicover India, the India hospital operations of leading international healthcare and diagnostic services provider Medicover.

== History ==
Medicover was established in 1995 and headquartered in Sweden. Medicover Warsaw Hospital first opened in Poland in 2009.

In August 2017, Medicover acquired a majority stake in the MaxCure Hospitals network in India through its investment in Sahrudaya Healthcare Private Limited. Following the acquisition, the MaxCure hospitals were rebranded as Medicover Hospitals.

Medicover Hospitals has 26 hospitals across several states in India including Telangana, Andhra Pradesh, Maharashtra, and Karnataka. Major hospital locations includes Hyderabad, Vishakapatnam, Navi Mumbai, Bengaluru, and Pune.

In March 2026, the group opened a new hospital in the Financial District of Hyderabad, expanding its hospital network in India.

== Departments ==
The following departments are served by Medicover Hospitals India:

- Cardiology
- Orthopedics
- Neurology
- Oncology
- Gynecology
- Obstetrics
- Pediatrics
- Neonatology
- Gastroenterology
- General Surgery
- Nephrology
- Internal Medicine
- Plastic Surgery
- Urology
- Physiotherapy
- Critical Care
- Anesthesia
- Emergency Medicine
- Kidney Transplantation
- Liver Transplantation
- Ear, nose, and throat (ENT)
- Dermatology, cosmetic & plastic surgery
- Pulmonology
- Cardiothoracic and Vascular Surgeon (CTVS)
- Pancreas Transplant
- Psychiatry
- Dental
- Rheumatology
- Vascular Surgery
- Ophthalmology
- Endocrinology
- Interventional Radiology
- Neurosurgery
- Organ Transplantation
- Robotic Surgery
