= Krishna Hospital, Cuddalore =

Hospital in India

Krisha Hospital, Cuddalore is a hospital in Cuddalore, Tamil Nadu, India. A division of the non-profit Krishna Hospital & Research Foundation, it offers reasonable to free medical care to area residents from its main hospital and two rural health centers, depending on need. The hospital was founded by K. Krishnamurthy and Lakshmi Krishnamurthy in 1968. It provides services in a wide range of specialties, including pediatrics, cardiology, obstetrics, neurology, psychiatry and plastic surgery. In addition to inpatient services, it offers 24-hour emergency medical care and a pharmacy and is equipped to provide a wide range of diagnostic testing. The hospital also hosts a blood bank. It is affiliated with the Krishna Hospital School of Nursing.
