= Yatharth Hospitals =

Public Limited Healthcare Organization in India

Yatharth Hospital & Trauma Care Services Limited
- Type: Public
- Traded as: BSE: 543950; NSE: YATHARTH
- Industry: Healthcare
- Founded: 2008; 18 years ago
- Headquarters: New Delhi, India
- Number of locations: Nine
- Area served: India
- Key people: Dr. Ajay Kumar Tyagi (Chairman & Whole-time Director) Dr. Kapil Kumar (Managing Director) Yatharth Tyagi (Whole-time Director)
- Website: www.yatharthhospitals.com

Yatharth Hospital & Trauma Care Services Ltd is an Indian for-profit private hospital chain of North India. As of October 2026, Yatharth group operates 8 hospitals in North India, and has acquired its ninth hospital in Gurugram, taking the group’s total capacity to over 2,800 beds. It was founded by Dr. Ajay Kumar Tyagi and Dr. Kapil Kumar in 2008. Its facility in Greater Noida West is the first and only hospital in Uttar Pradesh to be accredited by Joint Commission International.

== History ==
Yatharth Hospitals commenced its operations in 2008. In 2013, Yatharth Hospital established its second hospital, a 250 bedded hospital, in Noida, followed by its third hospital in 2019 in Noida Extension.

In 2020, Yatharth Hospitals had one of the highest covid bed capacity in North India with 1100 covid beds, which turned out to be a beacon of hope for many covid patients. A 200 bedded private covid facility was set up at Yatharth Hospital, Noida Extension, which was the biggest private covid hospital in Uttar Pradesh.

In 2024, the company acquired Faridabad based 175 bedded multispecialty Asian Fidelis Hospital for Rs 116 crore, and expanded it to 200 beds. It was officially launched in May 2024. The company also announced acquisition of a super-specialty hospital in Delhi previously known as MD City Hospital – for a cost of approximately Rs 160 crore. It also announced that it has entered into a strategic collaboration agreement for the acquisition of a 60% stake in a 400 bedded hospital in Faridabad, Haryana.

Yatharth Hospital & Trauma Care Services Ltd was listed on the stock exchanges in August 2023.

In December 2024, Yatharth Hospital & Trauma Care Services Ltd raised ₹625 crore through Qualified Institutional Placement.

The group announced acquisition of Shantived Hospital, Agra in September 2025. In June 2026, it acquired a 250 bed hospital located in Gurugram.

== Controversies ==
In 2017, the family of a three-year-old child lodged an FIR against five doctors of Yatharth Super Speciality Hospital Greater Noida and Jaypee hospital (Now Max Super Speciality Hospital, Noida)for medical negligence.

National Organ & Tissue Transplant Organization (NOTTO), has sought a report from the Uttar Pradesh government after an illegal organ transplant racket was unearthed at Indraprastha Apollo Hospital in southeast Delhi with links to Yatharth Hospital in Noida. In 2023, the Income Tax department authorities carried out searches at 15 locations in Delhi-NCR and Uttar Pradesh on the premises linked to Yatharth Hospital and its promoters and directors.
