= Saraf Hospital =

Private hospital in Kochi, Kerala, India

Saraf Hospital is a private hospital located at Kochi in Kerala, India. It was built in the memory of late Vithal Govindrao Saraf. The best healthcare facility also offering healthcare packages including, Comprehensive Health checkup, Diabetes Health checkup, Special Health checkup for women, Well Women Health checkup, Basic women Health checkup, Pre Employment Health checkup.

It is home to the Beautiful Face Project, which provides surgery to people with dento-facial deformities so that their faces become more normal in appearance.
