= Currae Hospital =

Hospital chain in India

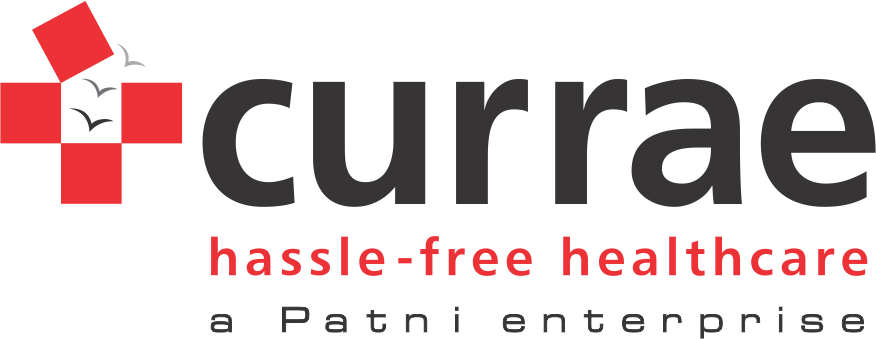
- Company type: Private
- Industry: Healthcare, Hospital
- Headquarters: India
- Number of locations: Thane and Mumbai
- Key people: Apoorva Patni, Devendra Dabak (MD & CEO Patni Healthcare)
- Parent: Patni Healthcare Limited
- Website: www.currae.com

Currae Hospital is a chain of multi-specialty hospitals in India. It has its hospitals in Thane and Mumbai.

Currae is owned by Apoorva Patni, son of Ashok Patni who co-founded Patni Computer Systems. Patni Healthcare Ltd. owns and operates Currae Hospitals. It is engaged in providing specialties including orthopaedics and spine, general surgery, bariatric, gynaecology, urology, plastic and cosmetic surgery and gastroenterology. It plans to set up about 20 hospitals under this brand focusing on child and mother care, orthopaedics and ophthalmology. Four were established between 2012 and 2016.

In 2016 it offered a cashless cataract surgery program for patients without health insurance where payment could be made by monthly installments without interest.

Currae Hospitals was recognised by the National Accreditation Board for Hospitals & Healthcare Providers, India in 2017 for its quality of healthcare

== Expansion & network ==
Apoorva Patni (Director at Currae Healthcare - a Patni enterprise), is planning an investment of Rs.500 crore to set up 30 hospitals by 2022. Two hospitals in areas of ortho-spine, mother & child and Infertility Treatment have been set up in Mumbai & Thane with an investment of Rs.100 crore.

Currae Hospitals currently has 2 hospitals in its network :

- Currae Specialty Hospital, Thane (W) (Kapurbawdi Junction)
- Currae Women's Hospital, Thane (W) (Ghodbunder Road)

It has established an investment fund, the Currae HealthTech Fund, which has made investments in 17 health technology companies.
