= Mahatma Gandhi Memorial Hospital =

Mahatma Gandhi Memorial Hospital is located in Warangal city of the Indian state of Telangana. It is a 1,450-bed hospital which is undertaken by the government of Telangana.

The then Health minister of Telangana, Etela Rajendar announced that the existing MGM Hospital will be upgraded to a world class teaching hospital under the KNRUHS. Mgm will be having around 3,000 outpatients per day. The super specialized hospital is in its final stage of construction, with almost all the specialities.
