= Dr. Jeyasekharan Hospital & Nursing Home =

Hospital

Coordinates: 8.184478°N 77.409907°E

Geography
- Location: Kottar-Parvathipuram Rd, Weavers Colony, Nagercoil, Tamil Nadu 629003, India

Links
- Website: http://www.jeyasekharanmedicaltrust.com/

Dr. Jeyasekharan Hospital was founded in Nagercoil in the southernmost district of India by the late Dr. N. D. Jeyasekharan and late Mrs. Rani Jeyasekharan in 1965. It is an ISO 9001-2015 and ISO 14001:2015 Bureau Veritas certified & NABH Accredited hospital. Presently, the Dr. Jeyasekharan Medical Trust includes Dr. Jeyasekharan Hospital and Nursing Home, the JMT Pharmacy, the School of Nursing & Paramedical Education, Dr. Jeyasekharan College of Nursing, Postgraduate medical education accredited to National Board of Examinations, Dr.JMT college of Allied Health Sciences and the Dr.Jeyasekharan Educational and Research Charitable Trust.

== History ==
In June 1965, Dr. N.D. Jeyasekharan left the Neyyoor Medical Mission after serving it for nearly nine years. He and his wife Rani started a nursing home with bare necessities. Shortly thereafter, the doctor decided to build a set of rooms with basic amenities, a good theatre and a labour room. Those were times when there were no tar roads, no street lights and no traffic except a few lorries as it was an isolated corner of the town. Fifty patient rooms, an operating theatre, a labour room and a general ward were built.

The Jeyasekharan Nursing Home was opened in a public meeting on 15 November 1967 by Dr. A. Asirvatham. Dr. Asirvatham, Principal and Dean of Madurai Medical College, was a former teacher of Dr. Jeyasekharan at Madras Medical College.

Today, the hospital is recognized by the National Board of Examinations, New Delhi.

The Trust is at present run by Trustees Dr.Devaprasath Jeyasekharan, Dr.Sabu Jeyasekharan & Dr. Ranjit Jeyasekharan, Administrators Dr. Renu Devaprasath, Mrs. Beena Sabu & Mrs. Sujatha Ranjit.

Dr. N.D. Jeyasekharan took premature retirement, giving way for his sons to carry on the work he started. He died on 30 January 2006.

== Departments and units ==
Dr. Jeyasekharan Hospital is a multispeciality hospital with the following departments:

- Anaesthesia
- Bronchoscopy
- Cardiology
- Dermatology
- Dentistry
- ENT
- Gastroenterology
- General Medicine
- General surgery
- Maxillofacial surgery
- Nephrology/Haemodialysis
- Neurology
- Neuro-surgery
- Obstetrics & Gynaecology
- Oncology
- Ophthalmic surgery
- Orthopaedics
- Paediatrics
- Paediatric surgery
- Palliative medicine
- Plastic surgery
- Psychiatry
- Pulmonology
- Radiology/ sonology
- Rheumatology
- Urology

The hospital also houses several intensive care and intermediate care units, including a multidisciplinary intensive/intermediary care unit, an intensive/intermediate coronary care unit, a paediatric intensive care unit and stepdown ward, a postoperative ward and a neonatal intensive care unit.

== Clinical services ==
Clinical services include:

- Biochemistry lab
- Clinical Pathology lab
- Microbiology lab
- Blood bank
- Dietetics
- Occupational therapy
- Physiotherapy
- Pharmacy
- Ambulance

== Education and Training ==
The Trust conducts the following recognized courses:

Recognized by National Board of Examinations, New Delhi: Post Graduate Degree courses to train candidates towards Diplomate of National Board in:

- General Surgery
- Anaesthesia
- General Medicine

Recognized by Government of Tamil Nadu:

- Diploma in General Nursing & Midwifery (GNM)
- Diploma in Medical Laboratory Technology (DMLT)

Affiliated to Dr. MGR Medical University:

- B.Sc. in Nursing
- B.Sc. in Operation Theatre & Anaesthesia Technology
- B.Sc. Radiography & Imaging Technology
- B.Sc. in Dialysis Technology
- B.Sc. in Cardiac Technology

Medical students from the U.K. and Germany have also been coming here for their elective postings.
