= Aswini Hospital =

Hospital in Thrissur, Kerala, India

Coordinates: 10.5347°N 76.2141°E

Aswini Hospital is a private multi-specialty hospital located in Thrissur, Kerala, India. The hospital is situated near Vadakkechira bus stand and Poonkunam railway station within the Thrissur Municipal Corporation area. Established as a 40-bed hospital in 1987, the hospital has expanded over time into a larger multi-specialty institution. The hospital also runs the Aswini School of Nursing in Nadathara, Thrissur. The hospital offers treatment to the people of Thrissur, Palakkad and Malappuram districts.

Sugadhan K K is the managing director of the hospital and Pradeep Chandran is the chairman. There are 80 doctors, serving in the hospital.

== History ==
Aswini Hospital was founded in 1987 in Thrissur. It began as a small hospital with limited bed capacity and expanded its facilities in subsequent years.
