= Navdeep Hospital and Emergency Care =

Coordinates: 29.3992485°N 76.9733937°E

Navdeep Hospital, Hair transplant & Laser Clinic is a private, multispeciality hospital in Panipat, India. It is located in 112, Sukhdev Nagar, Panipat. The hospital, which is named after Dr Navdeep Goyal, was established in 2009 to provide medical care to natives of Panipat and nearby districts.

Medical superintendent: Dr Navdeep Goyal.
