= Healthcare in Chennai =

Healthcare in Chennai, India

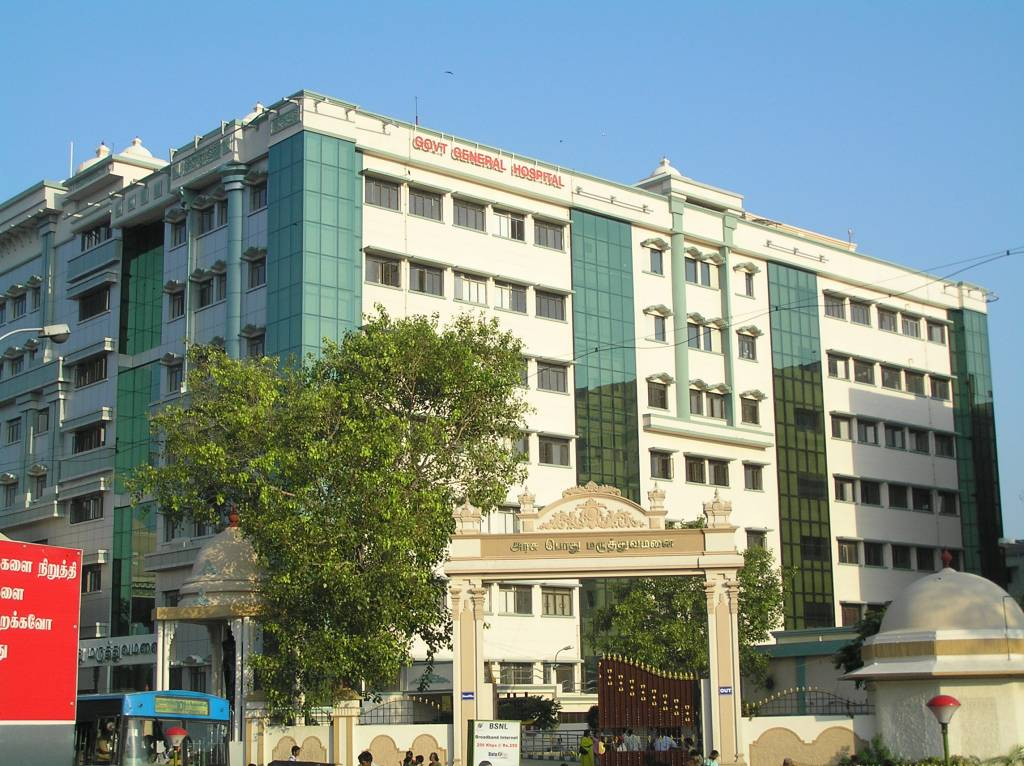
Façade of the Government General Hospital. Catering to about 40 percent of domestic and 45 percent of international health tourists arriving in the country, Chennai is termed the Health Capital of India.

Healthcare in Chennai is provided by both government-run and private hospitals. Chennai attracts about 45 percent of health tourists from abroad arriving in the country and 30 to 40 percent of domestic health tourists. The city has been termed Health Capital of India. Multi- and super-specialty hospitals across the city bring in an estimated 150 international patients every day. Factors behind the tourists' inflow in the city include low costs, little to no waiting period, and facilities offered at the speciality hospitals in the city.

== History ==
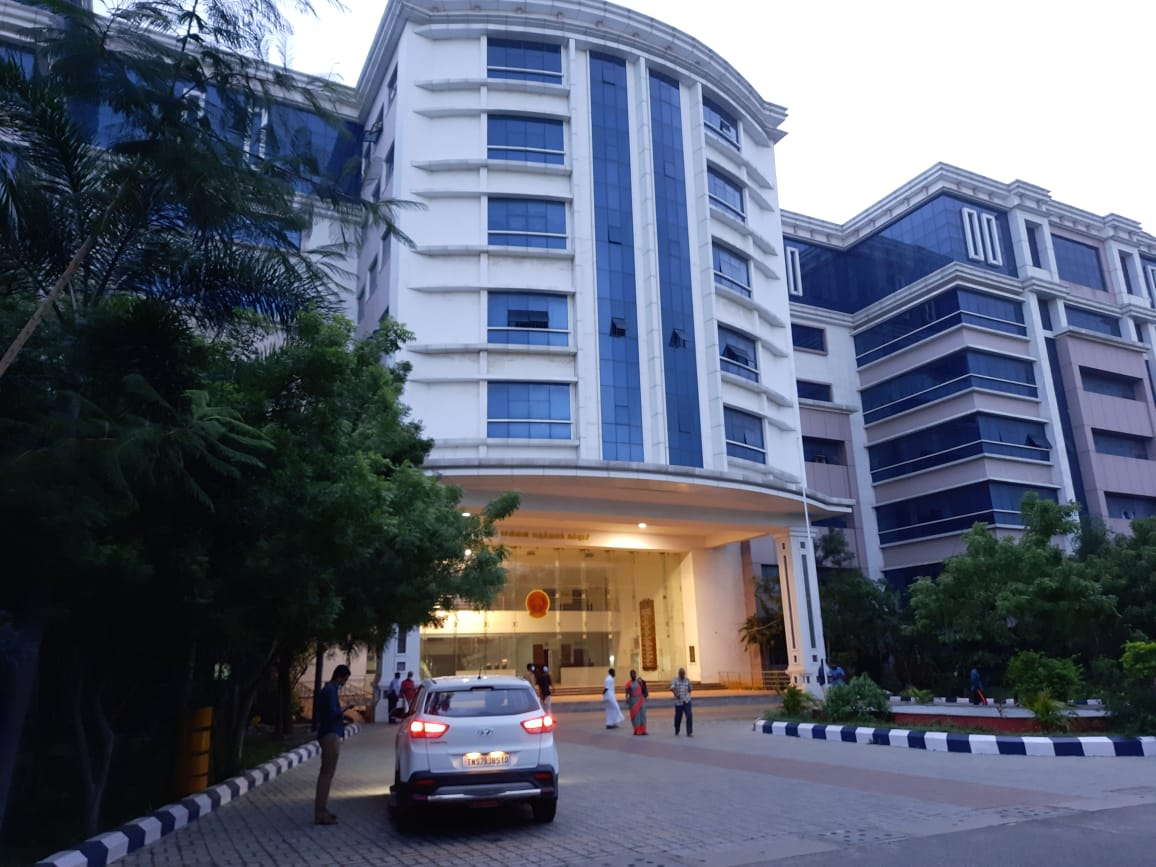
Madras Medical College

The medical lineage of the city began with the first hospital of India set up at Fort St. George on 16 November 1664 by Sir Edward Winter to treat sick soldiers of the East India Company. The hospital grew, expanded, and moved out of the fort to its present location in 1772, where it stands today as the Rajiv Gandhi Government General Hospital, and was opened to Indians in 1842. In 1785, medical departments were set up in Bengal, Madras, and Bombay presidencies with 234 surgeons.

Although the Western system of medicine was brought to India by the Portuguese, the base for a systematised and widespread network of government-run hospitals began with the hospital in Madras, as the city was known then. Throughout the colonial era, doctors from Europe and Eurasia trained and practised at the first hospital. Between 1800 and 1820, about four hospitals were formed in Madras. In 1835, Madras Medical College was set up, making it one of the oldest colleges of European medicine in Asia. In 1854, when the British government agreed to supply medicines and instruments to the growing network of minor hospitals and dispensaries, government store depots were established in Calcutta, Madras, Bombay, and Rangoon. In 1900, the Christian Medical College, Vellore was established, attracting some of the best talents in the United States. By 1933, Dr. Mehta's Hospitals was established. The Madras Public Health Act, the first of its kind in the country, was passed in 1939.

In the later half of the twentieth century, many prominent institutions began to appear in the city. The Cancer Institute in Adyar was set up in 1954, Voluntary Health Services hospital, Chennai was established in 1958 and Sankara Nethralaya was founded in 1976, adding to the city's reputation. Along with the Government General Hospital they served as renowned centres for diagnosis, treatment and research for decades. The establishment of the Apollo Hospital in the city in 1983 marked the advent of corporate hospitals in the country. The city is where one of the earliest paediatric intensive care units (PICUs) was established in the 1990s.

Today, Chennai is the hub of medical tourism in the country, an industry that is expected to grow at an estimated 30% per year, which is expected to become worth about ₹ 95,000 million by 2015, according to the Associated Chambers of Commerce and Industry of India.

== Healthcare institutes ==
The government-aided hospitals in the city include General Hospital, Government multi-super speciality hospital, Government Kilpauk Hospital, Government Royapettah Hospital, Government Stanley Hospital, Adyar Cancer Institute, TB Sanatorium, and National Institute of Siddha. The National Institute of Siddha is one of the seven apex national-level educational institutions that promote excellence in Indian system of medicine and Ayurveda. Non-profit hospitals in the city include Voluntary Health Services Hospital and the Hindu Mission Hospital. Some of the popular private-run hospitals in Chennai are Dr. Rela Institute & Medical Centre, Apollo Hospitals, SIMS Hospital, Dr. Kamakshi Memorial Hospitals, Chettinad Health City, Billroth Hospitals, MIOT Hospital, Global Health City, SRM Hospital, Vasan Healthcare, Kauvery Hospital, Deepam Pallavaram Hospital, Dr. Mohan's Diabetes Specialities Centre and OneHealth Super Speciality Hospital. The prime NABH-accredited hospitals includes Chennai Apollo Speciality Hospital, Dr Mehta Hospitals, Frontier Lifeline Hospital, Global Hospitals & Health City, Sankara Nethralaya, and Vijaya Medical & Educational Trust. Apollo Hospitals Group has five hospitals in the city, including a main hospital and a speciality oncology hospital, with a total bed count of 1,100. The city has about seven palliative care units. Poonamallee High Road, one of the arterial roads of the city, has more hospitals than any other roads in the city and is known as the city's 'Med street'.

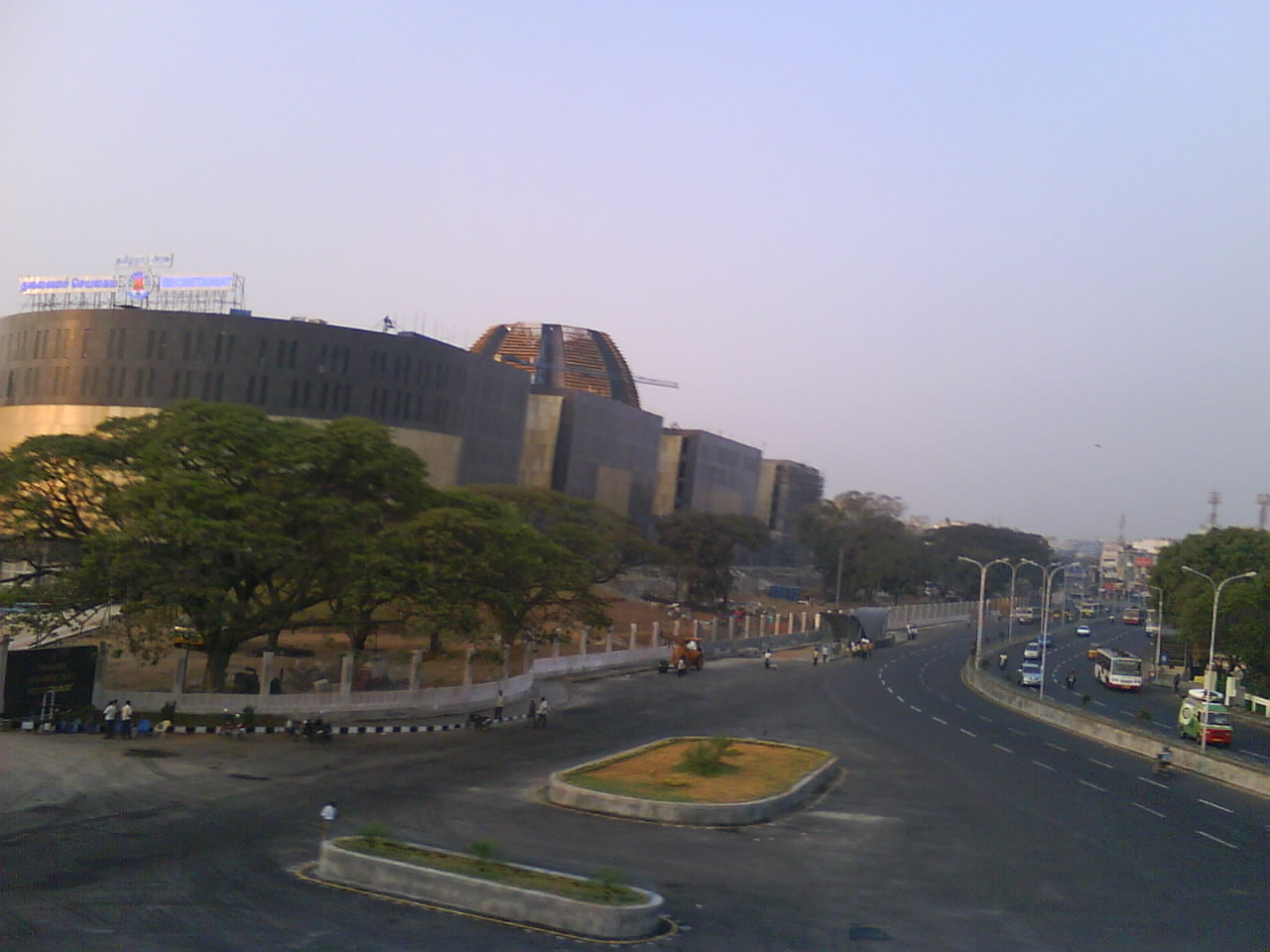
Government multi-super speciality hospital

As of 2012, the city had an estimated 12,500 hospital beds, of which only half is used by the city's population with the rest being shared by patients from other states of the country and foreigners. It is estimated that the number of beds in multi-specialty hospitals in the private sector in the city is in the range of 5,000 beds, whereas in the public sector it is over 6,000 beds. This works to 2.1 beds per 1,000 population against the national average of less than 1 bed per 1,000 population, making the city better than other cities in the country, viz., Delhi (1.4), Mumbai (0.8), Kolkata (0.8), Hyderabad (1.5) and Bangalore (2.1). However, this still does not fulfil World Health Organization norms of three beds per 1,000 persons. By mid-2012, with the addition of at least 3,000 beds in four leading hospitals in the city, the private hospital sector in the city is expected to increase its bed strength by nearly 25 percent. As of 2019, four government hospitals have pay wards, namely, Rajiv Gandhi Government General Hospital (198 beds), Institute of Obstetrics and Gynaecology and Government Hospital for Women and Children (46 beds), Government Kasturba Gandhi Hospital for Women and Children (32 beds), and Gastrointestinal Bleed Centre of Government Stanley Medical College Hospital (58 beds). The occupancy rates in these pay wards was 90 to 100 percent.

According to Chennai Corporation sources, there are about 250 registered laboratories in the city, although there are almost thrice as many unregistered ones. The city has six units of the state government's co-operative drug stores across the state known as Kamadhenu co-operative medical stores, where a wide range of 13,000 important medicines would be sold, including 6,000 medicines available on any given day. The government is planning to add 10 more stores in the city.

In May 2011, Corporation of Chennai initiated an online direct health-reporting system under which all the hospitals in the city are required to provide details of the patients on a daily basis to the corporation.

List of major hospitals in Chennai
Institute	Hospital type	Locality	Established	Chief specialty	Number of beds	Notes
Voluntary Health Services hospital, Chennai	Non-profit hospital	Tharamani Rajiv Gandhi Salai Old Mahabalipuram Road Chennai	1958	Multi-Speciality Hospital & Research institute	218	Pioneers in many healthcare research
Government General Hospital	Government	Park Town	1664	General medicine	2,029	The first medical institution in India
Dr. Mehta's Hospitals	Private	Chetpet, Velappanchavadi	1933	Multi Specialty Tertiary Care		
Dr. Rela Institute & Medical Centre	Private	Chromepet	2018	Multi Specialty	450	A quaternary care hospital known for its expertise in liver transplantation and oncology
Vijaya Hospital	Private	Vadapalani	1972	Multi Specialty	750	Multi Specialty Hospital in Chennai
SIMS Hospital	Private	Vadapalani	2014	Multi Super Specialty Quaternary Care	345	Corporate Hospital established by SRM Group
Government multi-super speciality hospital	Government	Government Estate	2014	General medicine	400	Originally built as an assembly complex but later converted into a hospital
Dr. Mohan's Diabetes Specialities Centre	Private	Gopalapuram	1991	Diabetes		
Government Royapettah Hospital	Government	Royapettah	1911	General medicine	712	
Government Stanley Hospital	Government	Vallalar Nagar	1799	General medicine	1,271	
Kilpauk Medical College Hospital	Government	Kilpauk	1960	General medicine	515	
Perambur railway hospital	Government	Ayanavaram	1928	General medicine	505	
Institute of Obstetrics & Gynaecology Hospital for Women & Children	Government	Egmore		Obstetrics & Gynaecology and Paediatrics	752	
Institute of Child Health & Hospital for Children	Government	Egmore	1948	Paediatrics	537	
Government Institute of Mental Health	Government	Kilpauk	1794	Neurology	1,800	Second largest mental health institute in India
Government Peripheral Hospital, K. K. Nagar	Government	K. K. Nagar	1977	General medicine	100	
Government Peripheral Hospital, Tondiarpet	Government	Tondiarpet	1979	General medicine	100	
Government Peripheral Hospital, Anna Nagar	Government	Anna Nagar	1979	General medicine	100	
Regional Institute of Ophthalmology and Government Ophthalmic Hospital	Government	Egmore	1819	Ophthalmology	478	
Government Institute of Rehabilitation Medicine	Government	K. K. Nagar	1979		60	
Government Hospital of Thoracic Medicine	Government	Tambaram Sanatorium	1920	Thoracic medicine	776	
Raja Sir Ramasamy Mudaliar Lying-In Hospital	Government	Royapuram	1880		510	
Voluntary Health Services	Private	Taramani	1958		465	
Government Kasthuribai Gandhi Hospital	Government	Chepauk			695	
Institute of Thoracic Medicine, Chetput	Government	Chetput	1916			
Thiruvetreeswarar Hospital for Thoracic Medicine, Otteri	Government	Otteri				
Tamil Nadu Government Dental College and Hospital	Government	George Town	1953			
Adyar Cancer Institute		Adyar	1954	Oncology	423	Rated by the World Health Organization as the top-ranking centre in the country
Apollo Hospitals		Greams Road	1983			First corporate hospital in the country
Chettinad Health City	Corporate	Kelambakkam	2007		600	
Fortis Malar Hospital	Corporate	Adyar			161	
Hindu Mission Hospital	NGO	Tambaram	1982		220	
LIMA (Lifeline Institute of Minimal Access) Keyhole Surgery	Corporate	Kilpauk	1932	Keyhole Surgery (since 1997)	100	Started as an individual-owned clinic
MGM Healthcare	Private	Aminjikarai		General medicine	400	
Madras Medical Mission		Mugappair	1987		207	
National Institute of Siddha		Tambaram	2005		120	
OneHealth Super Speciality Hospital	Private	Vandalur	2022	Multi Speciality Tertiary Care	65	
Sankara Nethralaya			1978			
Sir Ivan Stedeford Hospital		Ambattur	1966		212	
Sri Ramachandra Medical College		Porur	1985		>1,500	
Sundaram Medical Foundation		Anna Nagar	1990			
Dr. Kamakshi Memorial Hospitals	Corporate	Pallikaranai, Velachery & Chennai	2005		300	Performed more than 45000+ critical surgeries
MIOT Hospital	Private	Manapakkam	1999	Orthopaedics and Traumatology	1000	Performed more than 30,000 joint replacement surgeries
Billroth Hospitals	Corporate	Shenoy Nagar, RA Puram and Tiruvallur	1990		600	
Balaji Dental and Craniofacial Hospital		Teynampet	1994		25	
Deepam Pallavaram Hospital		Pallavaram	1995	Trauma Care	>135 to 250	
Apollo Hospitals	Private	21 Greams Lane, Off, Greams Road, Thousand Lights	1983	Multi Specialty Tertiary Care	560	

== Home healthcare ==
Home healthcare and home nursing are also a growing phenomena in India. India Home Health Care is one such service provider, based in Chennai and Bangalore with over 300 nurses. Since 2014, on-demand platforms like "Treat at Home" app are providing services like doctor home visit, nursing, caretaking and physiotherapy to patients at home by connecting them with their nearest available providers.

== Medical education ==
The city has four government medical colleges and one ESI medical college, apart from private medical colleges. The four government-run colleges include Madras Medical College, Stanley Medical College, Kilpauk Medical College, and Omandurar Government Medical College.

== Medical tourism ==
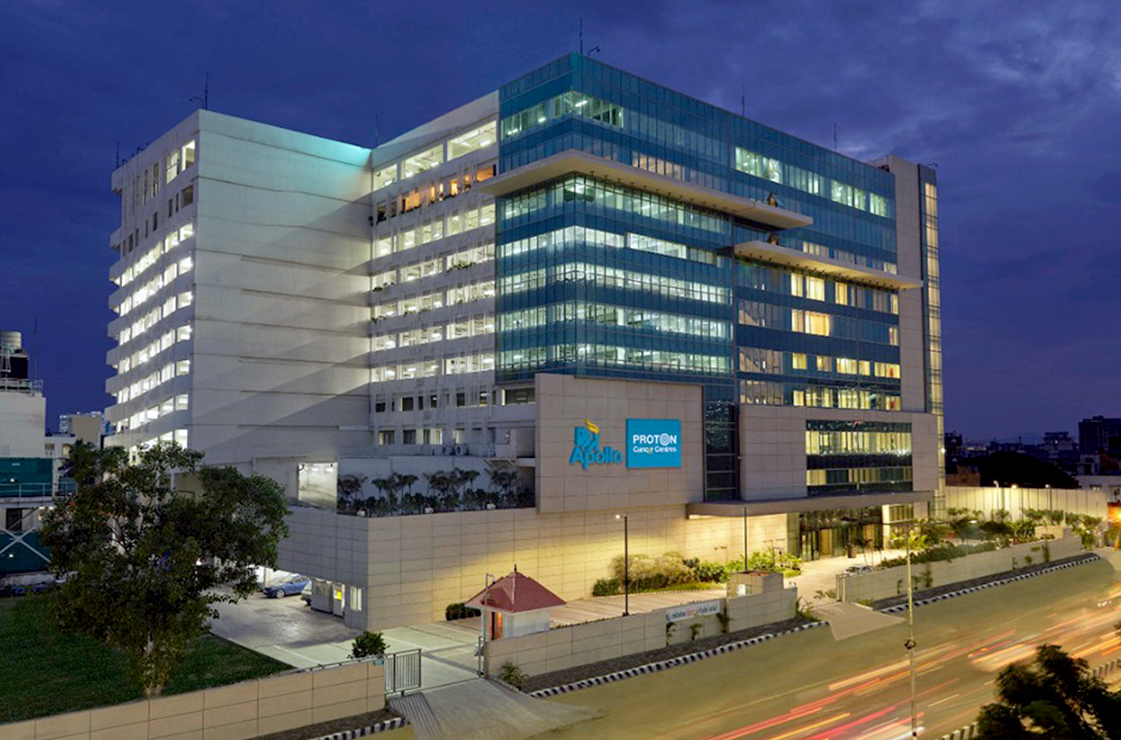
Apollo Hospitals in Chennai

With people from across the country and abroad preferring to get treated in the hospitals in Chennai, the city is increasingly becoming a hub of medical tourism. According to a study by Confederation of Indian Industries (CII), Chennai attracts about 40 percent of the country's medical tourists. As of 2013, the city receives up to 200 foreign patients every day. The Coromandel Express, which plies between Kolkata and Chennai, is nicknamed 'Ambulance Express' in Howrah since it regularly ferries a chunk of patients from the eastern region for medical treatment at hospitals in Chennai. Foreigners, especially those from developing and underdeveloped countries such as Nigeria, Kenya, Burundi, Congo, Malawi, Bangladesh, Oman and Iraq, come to the city for advanced medical care. About 150 Maldivian patients arrive at the city every day for medical treatment, which resulted in Maldivian Airlines launching a thrice-a-week direct flight from Male to Chennai. From Malawi, numerous patients are travelling to India. Their most preferred destination is Chennai & Medobal healthcare. However, there are no consolidated statistics about the number of foreign patients that the city receives. Most leading hospitals, which receive a steady stream of patients from other states of India and abroad every day, have separate wings for international patients. Sri Ramachandra Medical Centre receives up to 100 overseas patients a month. Dr.Kamakshi Memorial Hospital receives 10 to 15 foreign patients in a month. Fortis Malar Hospital receives 15 to 20 foreign patients a month. Madras Medical Mission receives 14 foreign medical tourists every month, mainly from East African nations. Sankara Nethralaya receives nearly 500 overseas patients a month. MIOT Hospitals receives nearly 300 foreign patients every month. The Medical Tourism Industry in India is expected to reach US$9 billion by 2020.

== Special certifications ==
With more than 75 percent of the medical tourists being from the Middle East, hospitals in the city are vying for 'halal' certification. On 14 May 2012, the city-based Global Health City became the first in the country to receive the halal certification from the Halal Development Authority. Other hospitals in the city that have applied for the certification include Dr. Mehta's Hospitals and Lifeline Hospitals. Halal-friendly medical tourism services include food, prayer hall, 'quiblah' (the direction of Mecca) signs in every room, prayer mat, copies of Quran and appointments of woman physicians for woman patients.

== Supportive infrastructure ==
In January 2010, Aloka Trivitron Medical Technologies Park, the country's first medical technological park, was inaugurated in the SIPCOT complex at Irungattukottai in Sriperumbudur. Spread across 25 acres, the medical technology park, a facility to produce high-tech medical equipment, is designed to house 10 international medical technology manufacturers, in addition to Trivitron's own manufacturing units. The range of products to be manufactured at the medical technology park include ultrasound systems, X-ray machines/C-arm, in-vitro diagnostic reagents, modular operating theatres, operating room tables and lights, molecular diagnostic products, hemodialysis products, ECG/cardiac diagnostic instruments, critical care instruments and implantable medical devices.

== NGOs and Non-Profits ==
Chennai has a strong base of healthcare non-profit organisations and non-government organisations. One such example is the Indian Heart Association, focused on cardiovascular health prevention.

Other NGO example includes MOHAN Foundation that works for awareness for cadaver donation since 1997 and creating an organ sharing registry in the state of Tamil Nadu.

== Facts and records ==
A former superintendent of the Regional Institute of Ophthalmology in the city, Kirk Patrick, was the first to have found the adenovirus that caused conjunctivitis, leading to the name Madras eye for the disease.

The city is preeminent in transplant surgery, with several city-based hospitals creating records in such surgeries. Chennai recorded the first ever liver transplant in the country in the Government Stanley Medical College in the 1990s.

In May 2011, the Madras Medical College opened the first-of-its-kind Orthopaedic Cadaveric Skills Lab in any government college in the country to train post graduate students in cadaveric dissection.

In March 2012, the Government General Hospital performed its 1,000th kidney transplant, the highest in any government hospital in the country, of which about 90 were cadaver transplants.

In 2008, the state government established a cadaver transplant programme at the Chennai Medical College. The programme has a regular transplant-coordinator and a computerised network linking government and private hospitals. Apollo Hospitals and the Government General Hospital continues to be the two main sources of cadaveric organs in the city. With the organ donor rate in the state of Tamil Nadu standing at 1.2 per million population, which is 15 times the national average, Chennai acts as a hub of deceased organ donation in India.

Tamil Nadu has been the number one state in deceased donation. It has been awarded the best performing state in organ donation and transplantation in India by the Indian government for 2015 and 2016.

In 2009, a group of doctors and specialists in Chennai and Coimbatore registered the successful treatment of thalassemia in a child using a sibling's umbilical cord blood.

== Future projects ==
In August 2011, the state government decided to convert the much controversial, half-constructed Assembly-Secretariat complex in the city, built at an estimated ₹ 10,920 million, into a multi-specialty hospital.

The city-based KM Cherian–promoted Frontier Lifeline has proposed a ₹ 10,000-million medicity project named Frontier Mediville on 350 acres of land of which 42 acres had received special economic zone (SEZ) status from the central government in 2009. Located at Elavur village, 40 km from the city centre, the project will be executed in three phases. The ₹ 1,600-million first phase will comprise a medical science park in the SEZ zone. It also includes a research and training centre and an animal laboratory to house clinical research organisations (CROs). The second will costing ₹ 5,000 million includes a ₹ 1,440-million bio hospital with 200 beds in the SEZ. The bio hospital is expected to be the first of its kind in India, designed as tertiary care in all sub-specialities of medicine supported by modern basic sciences including stem cell technology, tissue engineering and nanotechnology, which would also focus on integration of traditional and alternate medicinal technologies such as ayurveda, naturopathy, and siddha to the services. The second phase also includes another 750-bed multispeciality general hospital to be developed outside the SEZ.

In 2014, the Indian government decided to establish a regional centre for organ transplant in Chennai, which would be one of the five regional centres in the country. The regional centres would collect data and send it to the national registry. The Chennai centre would cover the southern states of Tamil Nadu, Andhra Pradesh, Karnataka, Kerala, Pondicherry, and Andaman and Nicobar and Lakshadweep islands.

== Criticisms ==
Despite being known as the 'Mecca' of healthcare, only six private hospitals in the city have been accredited by the National Board for Accreditation of Hospitals and Healthcare Providers (NABH) as of 2012. However, per a release by National Board for Accreditation of Hospitals and Healthcare Providers, over 23 hospitals in the city were NABH accredited as of 2017.

Per a research published in the August 2011 issue of the Journal of Clinical Pharmacy and Therapeutics, there was no evidence of falsification of medicines in a sampling study carried out in the city, though 43 percent of drugs were substandard.

== See also ==
- Healthcare in India
- List of hospitals in India
- Medical tourism in India
- Organ transplantation in Tamil Nadu
