= Tamil Nadu Government Multi Super Speciality Hospital =

Coordinates: 13.069205°N 80.273699°E

- Government of Tamil Nadu
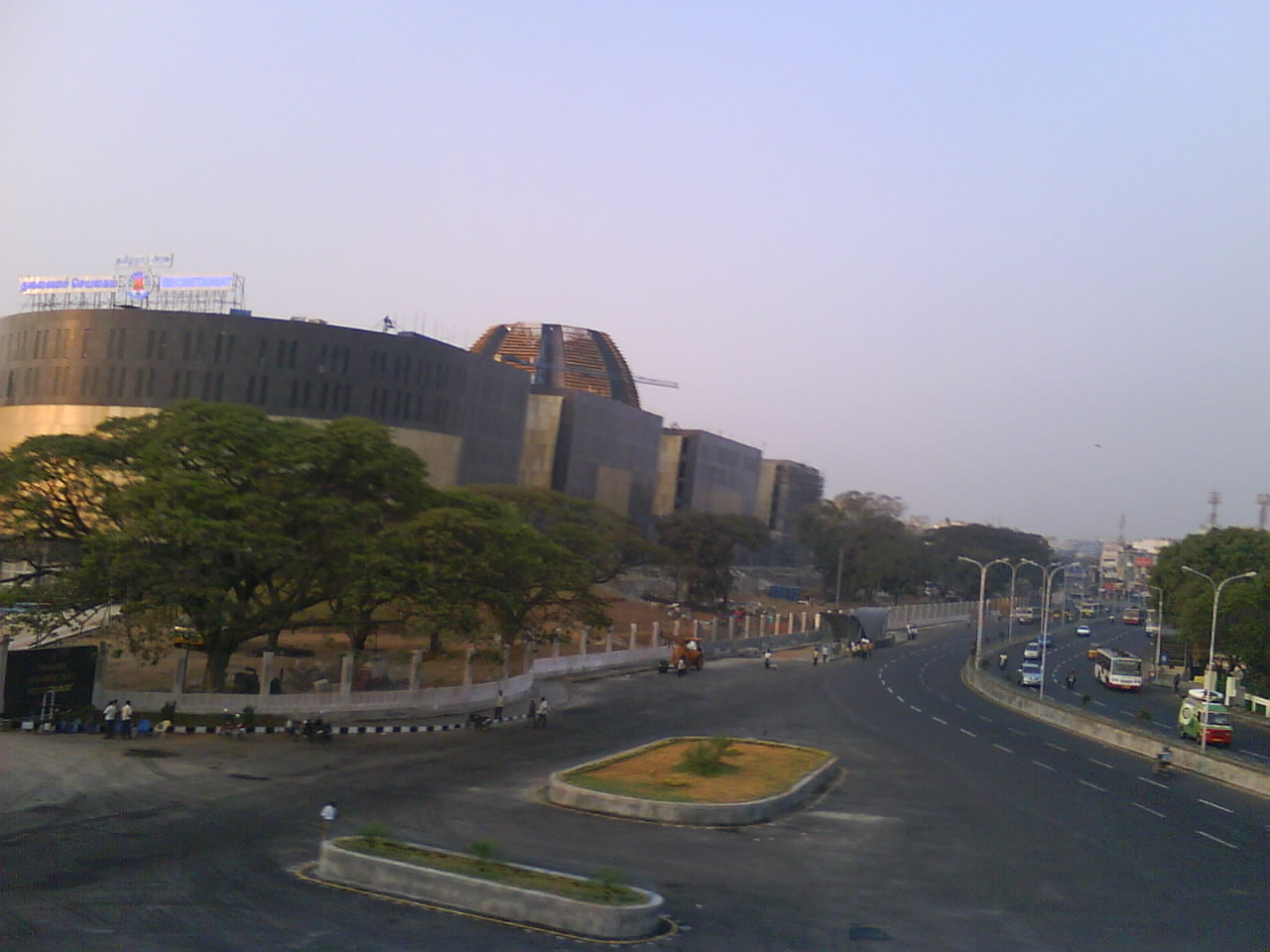
- Government Multi Super Speciality Hospital, Chennai

Geography
- Location: Government Estate, Anna Salai, Chennai, Tamil Nadu, India

Organisation
- Care system: Public
- Type: Full-service medical center, referral, and teaching hospital

Services
- Beds: 400

Tamil Nadu Government Multi Super Speciality Hospital

General information
- Construction started: 2008; 18 years ago
- Completed: 2010; 16 years ago
- Inaugurated: March 13, 2010; 16 years ago (as legislative assembly building); February 21, 2014; 12 years ago (as hospital)
- Cost: ₹ 4,250 million in 2010
- Owner: Government of Tamil Nadu

Height
- Top floor: 5

Technical details
- Floor count: 6
- Floor area: 1,930,000 sq ft (179,000 m^{2})

Design and construction
- Architect: Gerkan, Marg and Partners

Tamil Nadu Government Multi-Super-Speciality Hospital is a 400-bed government-owned super-speciality hospital in Chennai, India. It is located at the Omandurar Government Estate on Anna Salai and was opened in February 2014. Originally built as Tamil Nadu legislative assembly and secretariat complex in 2010 to house the assembly hall, secretariat and offices of the chief minister and cabinet ministers, the complex was later converted into a super-speciality hospital. It was built in 1.93 million sq ft. at a total cost of ₹ 4,250 million in 2010.

== History ==
Attempts to build a new assembly complex dates back to 1983 when M. G. Ramachandran was the chief minister. He floated the idea of constructing an assembly complex in front of Marina beach and even moving to Tiruchirappalli during severe water scarcity in Chennai city. The idea was later revived again in 2002 when J. Jayalalithaa was the chief minister. She announced in the Assembly that the government was considering a 2,000-acre administrative city near Maamallapuram. Later it was stated that the proposed city would come up in Thiruvidanthai and Thaiyur villages, about 40 km south of Chennai. In January 2003, the Chennai Metropolitan Development Authority (CMDA) signed an agreement with the Construction Industry Development Board of Malaysia for a feasibility study of the administrative city project. Subsequently, Jayalalithaa informed the Assembly that as the proposed administrative city would take 15 to 25 years to build, the Secretariat would be shifted to a vacant space opposite the Marina Beach in two years. Originally, the Lady Willingdon College campus was chosen. However, since the area (about 15 acres) of the campus was found inadequate, she came up with the proposal of building a new Integrated Assembly building in the 30-acre Queen Mary's College, Chennai campus, which she announced in April 2003. But this was dropped due to opposition from the political parties and the students of the college concerned.

Five months later, the government decided to establish the Secretariat over an extent of 43 acres in Kotturpuram that belonged to Anna University, the Madras University and the State Government Data Centre. The CMDA was entrusted with the work of selecting the architect and the construction agency apart from being authorised to mobilise funds. It was reported that M. K. Stalin, at the time of this proposal, went to the college and supported the student's strike. In October that year, Jayalalithaa laid the foundation stone for the project. Seven months later, there was rethinking on the project.

In May 2007, when the Assembly organised celebrations to mark the completion of 50 years of association of the then Chief Minister M. Karunanidhi with the legislature, the idea of constructing the Assembly-Secretariat complex was mooted. Karunanidhi laid the foundation stone in June 2008 and the site was formally handed over to the contractors five months later.

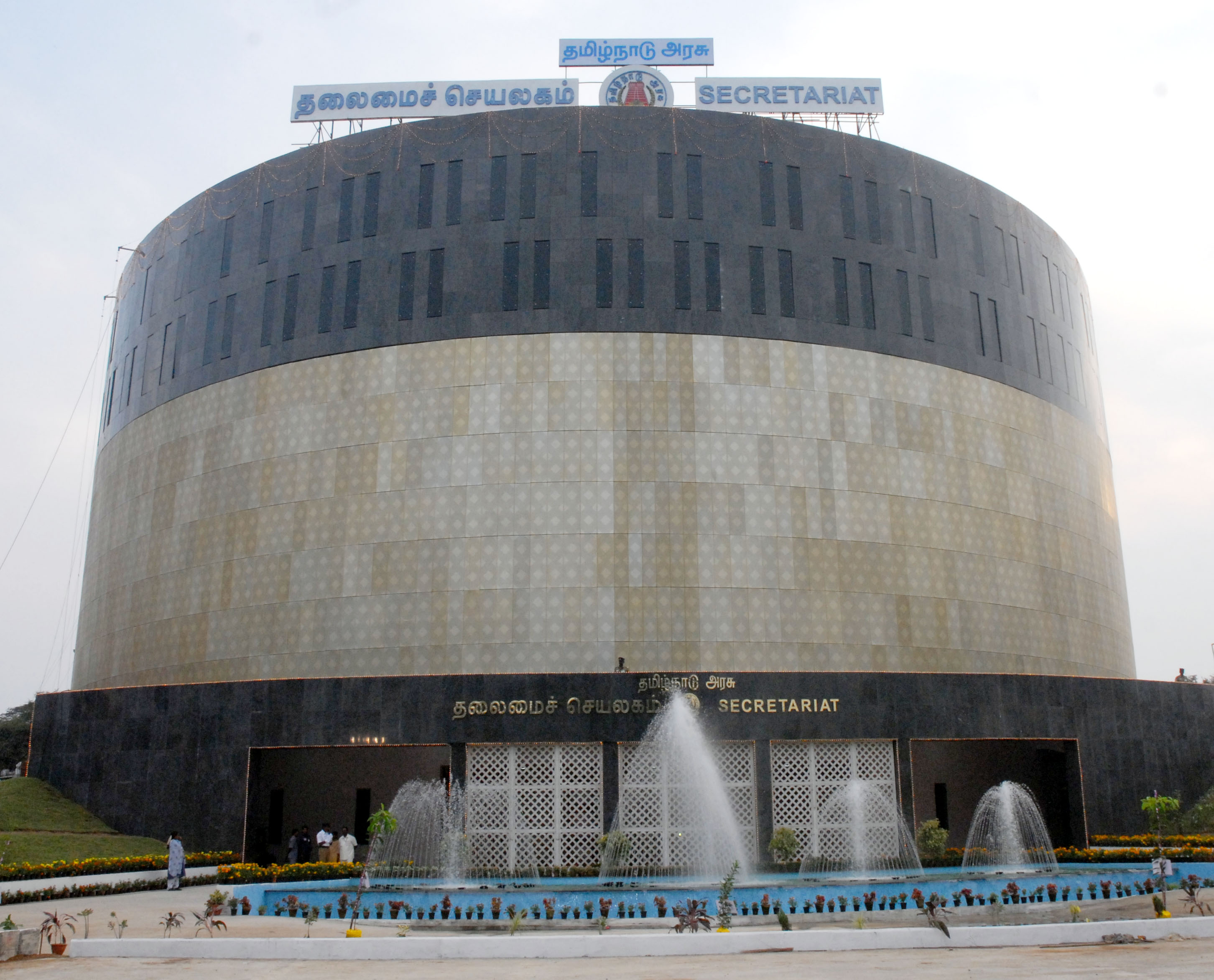
The complex in 2010, before conversion into a hospital

The building, constructed as a legislative assembly complex, was inaugurated on 13 March 2010 by the then Indian prime minister Manmohan Singh. The construction was still incomplete at the time of its inauguration. A temporary dome was constructed at a cost of ₹ 30 million for the inauguration of the complex. The temporary dome was later dismantled to give way for a permanent dome, to be built at a cost of ₹ 250 million. A 3,200-sq.-ft. fully air-conditioned canteen to accommodate 200 people too was planned on the third floor of the complex's 'A' block.

=== Abandonment and conversion to hospital ===
The last session in the old assembly building at Fort St. George was held on 11 January 2010 by the former DMK government. When the AIADMK government came to power in May 2011, it abandoned the building and moved back to the former legislative building, Fort St. George. On 19 August 2011, Chief Minister Jayalalithaa announced in the state legislative assembly that the A-Block in new Secretariat complex, built by the previous DMK regime, would be converted into a multi-super specialty hospital and B-Block would be constructed as a government medical college. Work to convert the building to a multi-speciality hospital began in February 2013 following National Green Tribunal's approval. Modifications were made to suit the needs of the hospital.

=== Inauguration as hospital ===
The six-storied hospital was inaugurated on 21 February 2014, with four medical departments, namely, cardiology, neurology, medical oncology and nephrology and five surgical departments, namely, cardiothoracic, neuro, hand and reconstructive micro surgery, vascular and surgical oncology, in addition to a lifestyle clinic for yoga and naturopathy. Opened with 400 beds, the strength will be increased up to 500 beds.

== Cost and revisions ==
Originally planned for 1.8 million sq ft at a cost of ₹ 2,000 million the building’s dimensions were suddenly increased by an additional 130,000 sq ft and the final estimate was raised to ₹ 4,650 million. Increase in prices of inputs, additional works, design change, increase in the basement height of Block A and implementation of stringent fire safety measures and electrical safety standards as well as suggestions made from the angle of police security are cited as reasons for the increase in the project cost.

In January 2014, the government sanctioned an amount of ₹ 269.3 million towards the civil work, ₹ 760.4 million towards buying medical equipment and furniture, ₹20 million towards mosquito eradication measures, and ₹ 68.6 million towards completion of the dome, with a provision for natural lighting.

== Design ==
The complex is designed by German-based architect company GMP, a united venture of Meinhard von Gerkan and Volkwin Marg based at Berlin. Archivista Engineering Projects Pvt Ltd their Indian Partner carried out Detailed design engineering works. The construction of the new assembly was entrusted to East Coast Constructions and Industries Limited.

With its highly visible dome measuring 30 m tall and 45 m in diameter, the complex has four circular courtyards, and the design echoes the structural features of Dravidian temple complexes in south India. The dome is modelled on the Draupadi Ratha at Mamallapuram and resembles the top of a Tamil temple car. The complex has two blocks — Block A and Block B. The seven-storey Block A houses the hospital. A baffle wall is constructed in three layers and is being erected in a circular structure at a height of 100 ft.

Work on the construction of the seven-storey Block B started in December 2009 at an initial cost estimate of ₹ 2,795.6 million. Initially expected to be completed in 18 months, the construction work is still ongoing, and will house the medical college.

The plinth area of Block A is 930,297 sq. ft. (86,460 sq. m), while that of Block B is 743,900 sq. ft. The dome is cast in stone and closed with glass and will function as the principal iconic element. A park was initially created on the 5th floor of the Secretariat complex where the upper house was to be situated.

== Facilities at the hospital ==
The facilities include 14 dedicated operation theatres, laboratories, CT scan and MRI scans. Upon completion, the premises will have two blocks, namely, the hospital and a college with eight departments. The 400-bed hospital will also have a 500-seater conference hall. It will also have a hospital management information system with a storage capacity of 60 terabytes specifically to store patient information, including investigations and the treatment given. Other facilities would include two cath labs with diagnostic imaging equipment separately for the heart and brain, an emergency room near the entrance to the building, Wifi connectivity, mobile phone signal boosters, battery cars on every floor and in the compound and 150 surveillance cameras. The intensive care units have seventy electro-hydraulically operated imported beds with digital touch screens. Drinking water is dispensed by means of 10 water dispensers on each floor, which are sourced from the reverse osmosis plant with a capacity of 6,000 litres of water per hour, operated by remote monitoring software.

=== Treating COVID-19 patients ===
Following the coronavirus pandemic in Tamil Nadu, the government upgraded the hospital as an exclusive block with 500 beds to treat COVID-19 patients.

== Controversy ==
The building was constructed very fast in order to facilitate its opening in year 2010 which received criticism from opposition politicians. Two Public Interest Litigations were filed and concerns were raising about the safety of the construction. Both the petitions were dismissed by the court.

== Trivia ==
The main complex has been constructed at the site on the estate where an oil expeller had been kept alongside an old building. The oil expeller was kept there as a symbol of the suffering of people during the freedom struggle. V.O. Chidambaram Pillai (1872–1936), one of the luminaries of the national movement during the pre-Gandhi era, was made to operate it when he was imprisoned at the Coimbatore central jail. Thirty-six years ago, the oil expeller was found buried in Coimbatore and brought to Chennai for display on the estate. In the late 1990s, the oil expeller was removed to the Gandhi Mandapam complex.

== Location in Context ==
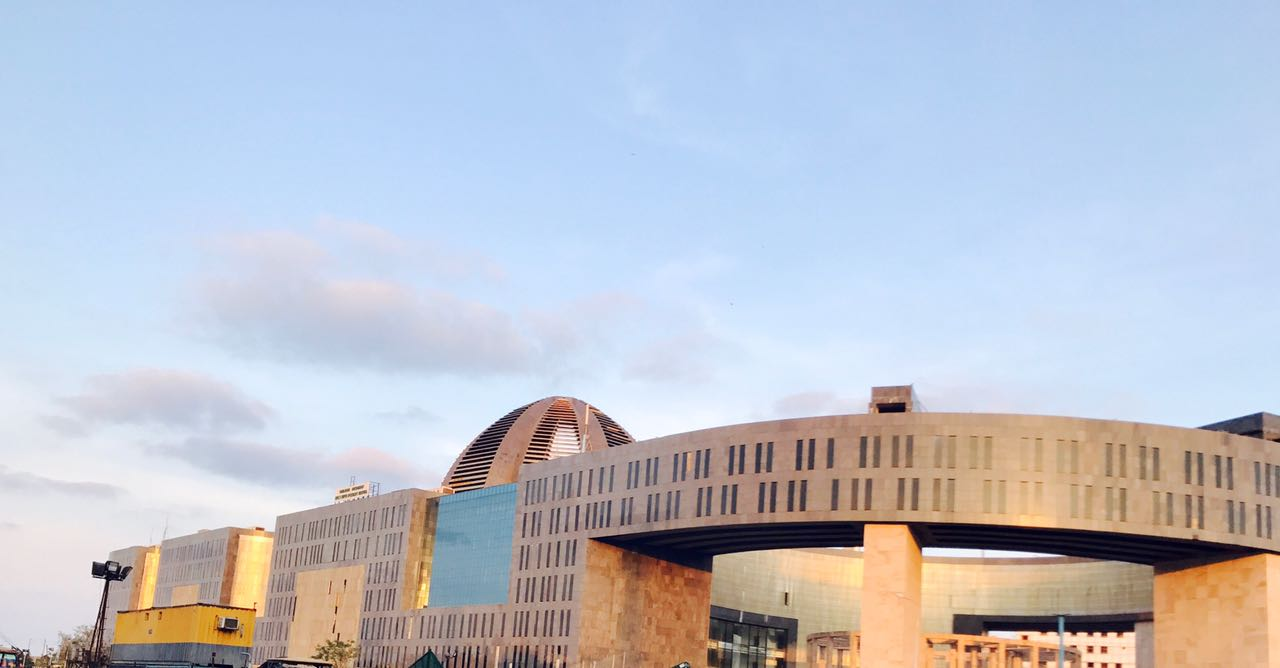
View of the super multi-speciality hospital Chennai from the road towards Pudhupettai

The hospital is located at the western end of the Omandurar Government Estate on Anna Salai, abutting the MRTS elevated railway line. The nearby railway stations include Chintadripet and Government Estate metro.

== See also ==
- Healthcare in Chennai
- Government General Hospital, Chennai
- Kilpauk Medical College
- Government Royapettah Hospital
- Stanley Medical College
- Government Hospital of Thoracic Medicine, Chennai
- Adyar Cancer Institute
- National Institute of Siddha
- List of Tamil Nadu Government Estates, Complexes, Buildings and Structures
