= Government Institute of Rehabilitation Medicine, Chennai =

Government Institute of Rehabilitation Medicine
- Government of Tamil Nadu

Geography
- Location: K. K. Nagar, Chennai, Tamil Nadu, India
- Coordinates: 13.035781°N 80.209347°E

Organisation
- Care system: Public
- Affiliated university: Directorate of Medical Education

Services
- Beds: 60

History
- Founded: 1979

Government Institute of Rehabilitation Medicine is a state-owned hospital situated in K. K. Nagar in Chennai, India. Founded in 1979, the hospital is funded and managed by the state government of Tamil Nadu and is attached to Directorate of Medical Education. It is the only government-run centre that makes prosthetic limbs.

== History ==
Tamil Nadu was the first state in the country to start a three-year diploma course in orthotics and prosthetics in the late 1960s. The course was conducted by the orthopaedics department of Madras Medical College to which the Government General Hospital is attached. In 1979, the Government Institute of Rehabilitation Medicine was opened, where students were trained to develop prosthesis. In 1968, the institute developed the Madras Foot, which was designed to incorporate metti (traditional toe rings) meant for married women. The design was later used by a physician named Sethi for the Jaipur foot.

== The hospital today ==
The hospital has been in limbo for many years now. As of 2013, the institute has only 12 workers. Although earlier there were 72 technicians, the vacancies created due to retirement were not filled for a long time, resulting in 64 posts being vacant.

== See also ==
- Healthcare in Chennai
- Government General Hospital
