= Dr. Mehta's Hospital =

Coordinates: 13.0718062°N 80.2382883°E

Dr. Mehta's Hospitals

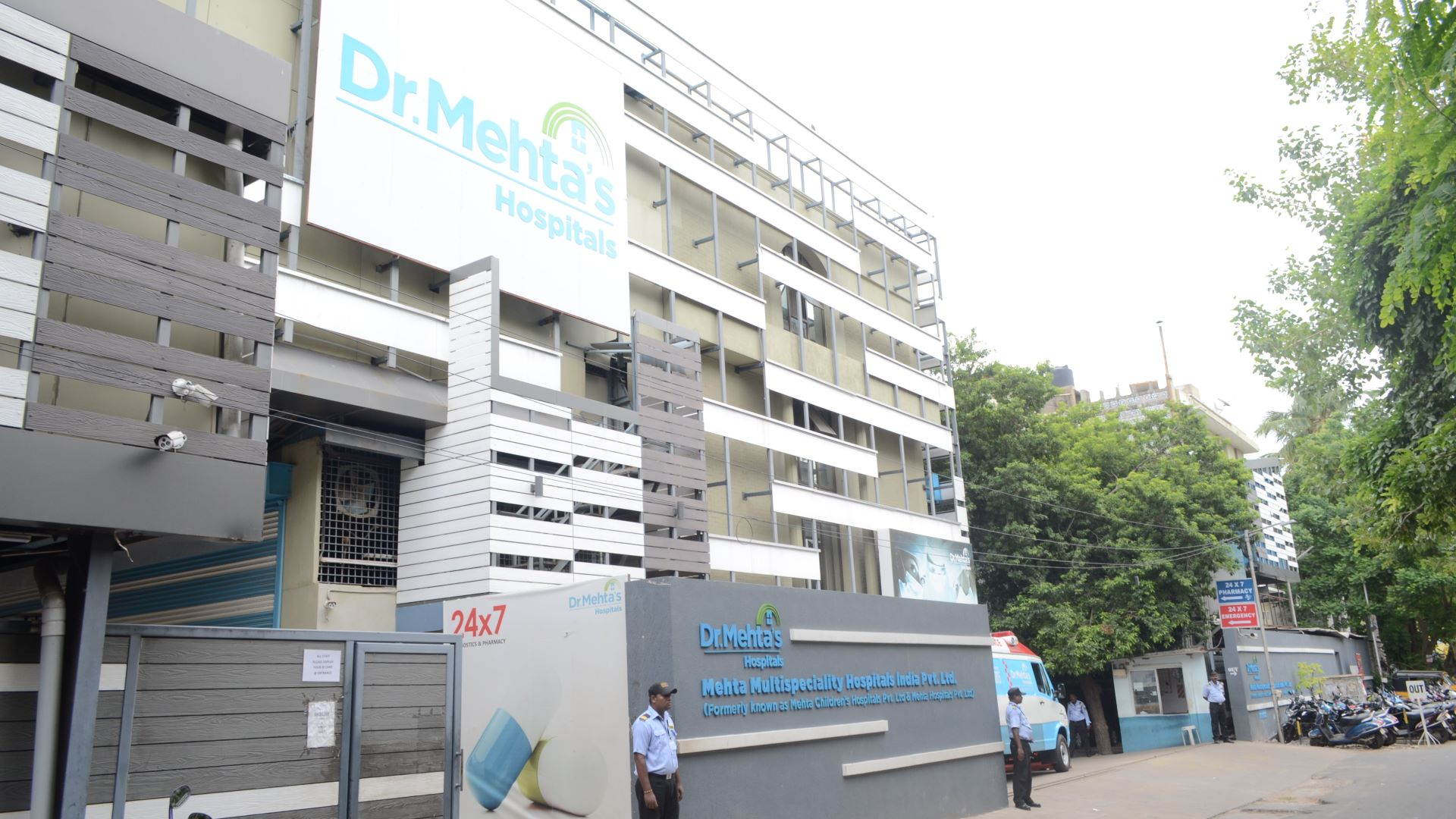
- Dr. Mehta's hospital

Geography
- Location: Chennai, Tamil Nadu, India

Organisation
- Care system: Private
- Type: Multispecialty Tertiary Care

Services
- Emergency department: Yes
- Beds: over 400

History
- Founded: 1933 by Dr. Anantrai Jayanatilal Mehta

Links
- Website: mehtahospital.com

Dr. Mehta's Hospitals is a private tertiary-care multispecialty hospital in Chennai, India, founded in 1933.It operates two campuses at Chetpet and Velappanchavadi and offers tertiary care across multiple medical and surgical specialties. Its services include pediatrics, neonatology, obstetrics and gynecology, cardiology, gastroenterology, neurosurgery, and critical care. The hospital is also an NBEMS-accredited teaching institution

== History ==
Dr. Mehta's Hospitals was established in 1933 by Anantrai Jayantilal Mehta, also known as A.J. Mehta, as a clinic and nursing home. In 1955, it relocated to Chetpet, where it expanded into a maternity and surgical hospital with one delivery room and two convalescence rooms. The hospital celebrated its 80th anniversary marking eight decades of healthcare service in 2013. As of 2026, Sameer Mehta serves as the Chairperson, Pranav Mehta as Director, and Dilip Mehta as Emeritus Chairperson.

== Expansion ==
Beginning in 2007, under the leadership of Sameer Mehta, the hospital underwent a phase of major expansion and modernisation, broadening its clinical services and infrastructure into a tertiary-care multispecialty healthcare institution. In 2014, the hospital announced plans for a new multi-acre campus near Thiruverkadu, in Velappanchavadi.

Four years later, in 2018, the Velappanchavadi campus (also known as the Global Campus) was inaugurated on 5.5 acres, with 220 operational beds, and the intention of scaling up to 1,000 beds. The centres of excellence in this campus includes specialities such as Cardiology, Obstetrics & Gynecology, Pediatrics, Neonatal Intensive Care (NICU), and Emergency Medicine.

In 2024, the hospital established a Cardiology Centre of Excellence at its Global Campus, equipped with a cardiac catheterisation laboratory and advanced critical care facilities.

== Education ==
The hospital is an NBEMS-accredited teaching institution offering postgraduate residency programmes, super-specialty training programs, university-affiliated post-doctoral fellowships, society-certified fellowship courses and Continuing Medical Education (CME) programmes for healthcare professionals.

== Facilities ==
The hospital provides intensive care services, cardiac catheterisation laboratories, diagnostic imaging, dialysis and renal transplant services, emergency care, rehabilitation services, and neonatal and pediatric intensive care units. Like:

- Advanced Critical Cardiac Care (ACCU) Unit
- Cardiac Catheterization Laboratory
- Echocardiography (ECHO)
- CT Scanner
- Operating Room
- Holter Monitor
- Electrocardiography (ECG)
- Intensive care units, including neonatal and paediatric intensive care units
- Operating theatres
- Cardiac catheterization laboratory
- Diagnostic imaging services, including computed tomography (CT), ultrasound, mammography, and radiography (X-ray)
- Cardiac diagnostic services, including echocardiography, electrocardiography (ECG), Holter monitoring, and treadmill testing
- Clinical laboratories, including biochemistry, microbiology, pathology, histopathology, and virology
- Dialysis and renal transplant services
- Emergency medical and ambulance services
- Rehabilitation services, including occupational therapy, psychology, and speech and language therapy

== Accreditation ==
- National Accreditation Board for Hospitals and Healthcare Providers (NABH)
- National Accreditation Board for Testing and Calibration Laboratories (NABL)
- National Board of Examination in Medical Sciences (NBEMS)
- Quality Accreditation in Healthcare India (QAI) - Emergency Medicine

== Recognitions ==
Times Healthcare Achievers Awards Tamil Nadu 2026

Economic Times Healthcare Awards 2026:

- Hospital of the year in Nursing Excellence in South India
- Hospital of the year in Laparoscopic Surgery in South India

India HealthNext Awards 2026:

- Best Patient Experience

Financial Express Healthcare Awards 2026:

- Excellence in Multispecialty Care in South India

Outlook & NEB Research Survey- Best Ranking Hospital 2026:

- 1st Best Pediatric Hospital in Chennai
- 2nd Best Multispecialty Hospital in Chennai
- 2nd Best Pulmonology Hospital in Chennai
- 2nd Best Oncology Hospital in Chennai
- 2nd Best Gastroenterology Hospital in Chennai
- 2nd Best Neurology Hospital in Chennai
- 2nd Best Endocrinology & Diabetes in Chennai
- 2nd Best Nephrology Hospital in Chennai
- 2nd Best Urology Hospital in Chennai
- 2nd Best Cardiology Hospital in Chennai
- 2nd Best Orthopaedic Hospital in Chennai
- 2nd Best Pediatrics Hospital in India
- 3rd Best Organ Transplant Hospital in Chennai
- 3rd Best Gynaecology & Obstetrics Hospital in India
- 4th Best Multispecialty Hospital in South India
- 7th Best Multispecialty Hospital in India
- 8th Best Cardiology Hospital in India
- 9th Best Orthopaedic Hospital in India

Outlook Business Southern Achievers Awards 2026:

- Clinical Excellence in Obstetrics & Gynecological Care
- Clinical Excellence in Neonatal, Paediatrics & Pediatric Surgery

Outlook & NEB Research Survey- Best Ranking Hospital 2025:

- 1st Best Pediatric Hospital in Chennai
- 2nd Best Nephrology Hospital in Chennai
- 2nd Best Gastroenterology Hospital in Chennai
- 2nd Best Oncology Hospital in Chennai
- 3rd Best Multispecialty Hospital in Chennai
- 3rd Best Cardiology Hospital in Chennai
- 3rd Best Endocrinology & Diabetes in Chennai
- 3rd Best Orthopedic Hospital in Chennai
- 3rd Best Urology Hospital in Chennai
- 3rd Best Neurology Hospital in Chennai
- 4th Best Pediatric Hospital in India
- 4th Best Pulmonology Hospital in Chennai
- 4th Best Organ Transplant Hospital in Chennai
- 6th Best Multispecialty Hospital in South India
- 8th Best Gynecology and Obstetrics Hospitals in India
- 9th Best Multispecialty Hospital in India
- 11th Best Orthopedic Hospital in India
- 13th Best Cardiology Hospital in India

Economic Times Healthcare Awards 2025:

- Hospital of the Year - Obstetrics & Gynaecology (OBGYN)
- Hospital of the Year - Cardiology
- Hospital of the Year - General Medicine

== See also ==
- Healthcare in Chennai
- List of Hospitals in India
