= Pooran Chand Joshi =

Indian academic (1956–2025)

P. C. Joshi
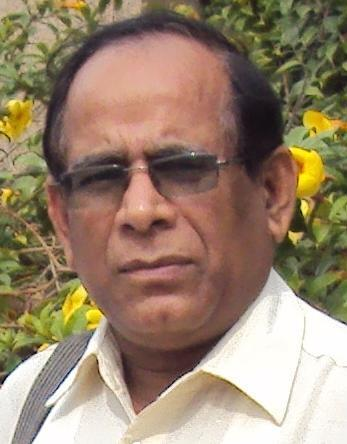
- Born: Pooran Chand Joshi; 1 June 1956; Khairakot, Almora district, Uttar Pradesh, India
- Died: 20 June 2025 (aged 69)
- Education: University of Delhi
- Awards: Indira Priyadarshini Vriksha Mitra National Award (1987); Inter-University Centre Associateship Award (1996–1999)
- Scientific career
- Fields: Social Anthropology, Medical Anthropology
- Workplaces: University of Delhi

P. C. Joshi (1 June 1956 – 20 June 2025) was an Indian academic who served as the 23rd Pro-vice-chancellor of the University of Delhi. He was a professor of Social Anthropology at the Department of Anthropology, University of Delhi, India. His area of specialization was Medical Anthropology and he focused on the Anthropology of Disasters, Anthropology of Development and on issues related to Social Exclusion and Adverse Inclusion.

Joshi served as Acting Vice-Chancellor of the university from 29 October 2020 after the suspension of Vice-chancellor Yogesh Tyagi and served there till 31 May 2021.

== Career ==
Joshi, Pro-Vice-Chancellor of the University of Delhi, assumed office on 28 June 2020.

Joshi was a delegate of the European Union at the United Nations Framework Climate Change Conference held at Poznan, Poland in 2008.

== Professional membership ==
Joshi was the first president of the Society for Indian Medical Anthropology and Executive Member of the Ethnographic and Folk Culture Society based in Lucknow, India. He was a life member of the India Anthropological Association and a Life Fellow of the Indian Association of Social Psychiatry. He was the Editor of the Society for Medical Anthropology Bulletin.

Joshi, Department of Anthropology, University of Delhi, was appointed to Pro-Vice-Chancellor.

On 28 October 2020, the President of India, who was a visitor to the University of Delhi, suspended incumbent VC Pro. Yogesh Kumar Tyagi and directed Joshi to assume the office of acting Vice-Chancellor of the University of Delhi forthwith till further arrangements.

== Death ==
Joshi died on 20 June 2025, at the age of 69.

== Awards and honours ==
Joshi was a recipient in 1987 of the Indira Priyadarshini Vrikshamitra Awards as a founder member of Friends of Trees, and the Inter-University Centre Associateship Award in Humanities and Social Sciences, 1996–1999, Certificate of Honour at the First France-India Meet on Psychiatry, Psychoanalysis and Psychotherapy, 2007, Plaque of Appreciation from Department of Sociology and Anthropology, Xavier University Ateneo de Cagayan de Oro City, Philippines, 2008, and Certificate of Appreciation on his research on disaster impacts in Asia and Europe by Faculty of Public Health, University of Indonesia in 2009, among other honours and distinctions.

He also had the distinction of discovering a Palaeolithic site in Delhi in 1983.

== Publications ==
Joshi co-authored nine books, over 157 articles, book chapters and reviews in areas of Medical Anthropology, Traditional Medicines, Shamanism, the Impact of Disasters, Lifestyle Diseases and Antibiotic Resistance. He worked on many research projects and submitted over 14 research reports to various funding agencies and government policy planning agencies. He worked in interdisciplinary areas with psychiatrists, psychologists, epidemiologists and other researchers on various topics and co-authored many papers. His papers appeared in the journals such as World Development, Indian Journal of Pharmacology, Man in India, American Journal of Orthopsychiatry, Indian Journal of Medical Research, Journal of Clinical Pharmacy and Therapeutics, and National Medical Journal of India.

Publications include:

- Studies in Medical Anthropology (co-editor with Anil Mahajan), Reliance Publishers, New Delhi, 1990.
- Tribal Health and Medicines (co-editor with A. K. Kalla). Concept Publishing Company, New Delhi, 2004.
- Risk factors for Mortality and Injury: Post-Tsunami Epidemiological findings from Tamil Nadu (co-author with Debarati Guha-Sapir, Lian Parry, Olivier Degomme, and J. P. Saulina Arnold). WHO Centre for Research on Epidemiology of Disaster, Brussels, 2006. (Also published in Hindi and Tamil)
- The Impact of Recurrent Disasters on Mental Health: A Study on Seasonal Floods in Northern India
