= K. K. Nagar =

K. K. Nagar or Kalaignar Karunanidhi Nagar may refer to:

- K. K. Nagar, Chennai, Tamil Nadu, India
- K. K. Nagar, Tiruchirappalli, Tamil Nadu, India.
