= Egmore Eye Hospital =

Hospital in Chennai, India

Regional Institute of Ophthalmology and Government Ophthalmic Hospital
- Former names: Madras Eye Infirmary
- Type: Public institution
- Established: 1819
- Location: Chennai, Tamil Nadu, India; 13.070313°N 80.260735°E
- Campus: Metropolitan
- Website: riogohchennai.in

The Egmore Eye Hospital, officially the Regional Institute of Ophthalmology and Government Ophthalmic Hospital, is a public eye hospital in Chennai, India. Considered the oldest eye hospital in Asia, the institute was established in 1819 and is the second-oldest hospital of its kind, next only to the Moorfields Eye Hospital in the United Kingdom.

The hospital is associated with the prestigious Government General Hospital and Madras Medical College, Chennai and is affiliated to the Tamil Nadu Dr. M.G.R. Medical University.

== History ==
The hospital was originally founded in the neighbourhood of Royapettah (on the grounds of the present-day Wesley Church) in 1819 as the Madras Eye Infirmary (MEI). The first to initiate the idea of a hospital was Dr. Travers, a surgeon in London with the East India Company, and in July 1819 Dr. Robert Richardson, another surgeon, came to Madras to establish the hospital. Modelled on Moorfields Eye Hospital in London, the hospital expanded under the leadership of Drake Brodeman from 1873. Although established in Royapettah, by 1820, the hospital was shifted to Egmore, where it occupied a tram shed until 1884, when the hospital was shifted to the present-day location, where it became known as the Government Ophthalmic Hospital from 1886. A couple of buildings were built in the premises. A black plaque outside the hospital premises reads: "Government Infirmary for gratuitous treatment of diseases of the eye."

Between 1904 and 1913, the hospital expanded under the superintendency of Lieutenant Colonel R. H. Elliot, who is credited for the Elliot's Trephine, an instrument used in glaucoma surgery. It was during his tenure that the Lawley Ward, a building that was declared a heritage building by the Archaeological Department of India, was built at the centre of the premises.

The Elliot School of Ophthalmology, the first in South India, was established in the hospital in 1919 by Elliot's successor Lieutenant Colonel Kirkpatric. In 1921, the Elliot Ophthalmic Museum was opened by Kirkpatric's successor Lieutenant Colonel R. E. Wright. Both of these were named after R. H. Elliot. The museum's holdings include an 1829 painting of an affected eye, sketches of tropical eye diseases by earlier practitioners, several 19th-century specimens of affected eyes and case registers (dating back to 1819), and centuries-old medical instruments. In 1940, K. Koman Nayar was appointed the hospital first Indian superintendent, who is remembered for building the Iris Repositor at the hospital. In 1942, the medical school started offering a post-graduate diploma program in ophthalmology. In 1948, India's first eye bank was opened here by the then superintendent R. E. S. Muthayya. With its opening, the hospital had an entire block dedicated for eye bank. It is believed that Muthayya was the first to perform a keratoplasty.

In 1960, an old garden house opposite the old campus was obtained to build its nurses' quarters. In 1962, the School of Optometry started functioning inside the campus.

The hospital began to employ microscopes for surgeries when E. T. Selvam first used one. The hospital became a Regional Institute in 1985 under the National Programme for Control of Blindness. The Government of India recognized the hospital as a centre of excellence following which government ophthalmologists from all over the country arrive at the hospital to undergo training.

== Description ==
With support from the Lions Club of Chennai District 324 A (an organized and separate eye bank that co-ordinates with the doctors, paramedical team and community support) workers ensure a 24-hour eye donation and eye banking service.

Training programmes offered include short-term exam-oriented training for diploma in National Board Exams.

=== Courses offered ===
- MS (Ophthalmology) and DO (Diploma in Ophthalmology) - Post-graduate courses after MBBS
- Optometry: Diploma in Optometry and BSc Optometry

== See also ==
- Healthcare in Chennai
- Heritage structures in Chennai
