= Government Dental Hospital and College, Chennai =

Dental wing of the Madras Medical College

Tamil Nadu Government Dental College
- Type: Dental college and hospital
- Established: 10 August 1953
- Affiliations: The Tamil Nadu Dr. M.G.R. Medical University
- Location: Chennai, India; 13°5′0″N 80°16′54″E
- Website: www.tamilnadudentalcollege.com

Tamil Nadu Government Dental College, also known as Government Dental Hospital and College, is the dental wing of the Madras Medical College. Although the college is a separate entity administratively, it is functionally integrated with the Madras Medical College and Government General Hospital.

The hospital is claimed to be the first in the country to provide treatment to 1,000 to 1,500 patients a day in various branches.

== Expansion ==
In 2012, new annexe building constructed at a cost of ₹ 206.3 million was inaugurated by the then Chief Minister Jayalalithaa. The new building consists of two floors with a capacity to treat nearly 300 patients at a time. The out-patient block and other facilities were transferred to the new building.

== See also ==
- List of Tamil Nadu Government's Educational Institutions
- List of medical colleges in India
- Healthcare in Chennai
