= Rela Institute & Medical Centre =

Rela Hospital

Geography
- Location: Chromepet, Chennai, India
- Coordinates: 12.953614°N 80.1385857°E

Organisation
- Care system: Quaternary
- Type: Specialist
- Patron: Prof. Mohamed Rela

Services
- Beds: 450
- Speciality: Multi-specialty

History
- Founded: 2018

Links
- Website: www.relainstitute.com

Rela Hospital is a multi-specialty hospital based in Chromepet, Chennai, India. It was founded in 2018 by Mohamed Rela, liver transplantation surgeon who currently serves as its chairman and director. It is a 450-bedded facility with over 55 clinical departments, and is primarily known for critically ill and multi-organ transplantation.

== History ==
The hospital was started in 2018 in Chromepet, Chennai, as a multi-specialty hospital with focus on critically ill and multi-organ transplantation. The 450 beds hospital is spread over 36 acres of land in Chennai and has 130 critical care beds, 14 operating rooms and advanced Radiology & Laboratory services.

In 2019, Rela Hospital performed a successful pediatric liver transplant on a 42 days old boy, which was the youngest successful pediatric liver transplant in India.

== Facilities ==
Rela Hospital has 55 medical departments and specialties to name a few Advanced Paediatric, Liver Disease and Transplantation, Obstetrics and Gynaecology, Orthopaedics, Critical Care and Anaesthesiology, Gastroenterology, Cardiology, Ear Nose and Throat diseases, Neurology, Radiotherapy, Radiology Treatment, Urological Diseases, Plastic & Reconstructive Surgery and other treatments.

== Achievements and Recognitions ==
Rela Hospital successfully performed Tamil Nadu’s first orthopedic balloon implantation on a senior citizen with a massive rotator cuff tear. This minimally invasive procedure, using the InSpace Balloon, significantly reduces pain and enhances biomechanics, marking a breakthrough in advanced shoulder surgery. This institute continues to push boundaries in heart and lung transplantation, reinforcing its status as a premier transplant center in India.

They have performed Advanced Endoscopic Breast Conservation Surgery for 60-Year-Old Cancer Patients. Rela Hospital Launches 24/7 Cath Lab for Acute Stroke Interventions.

Rela Hospital has launched Movement Disorder & DBS Troubleshooting Clinic for Parkinson’s Patients on April 10, 2024. Following that, they successfully performed Bilateral Lung Transplant on an 18-year-old girl.

On June 22, 2024, Rela Hospital became the first in Tamil Nadu to use synthetic ligaments for knee injury treatment. Mr. E. Manikandan, a 23-year-old software professional from Chennai, successfully underwent arthroscopic surgery at the hospital, where surgeons reconstructed two cruciate ligaments using artificial ligaments.

== Infrastructure & Technology ==
Rela Hospital is a multispecialty medical facility. It features 450 beds, 72 outpatient consultation suites, and a dedicated preventive health check lounge. The hospital houses India’s largest liver transplant ICU, a specialized ICU for pediatric multi-organ transplantation, and 159+ ICU beds catering to various specialties.

Its medical services include a fertility center, radiology and imaging services with 128 Slice CT, 3 Tesla MRI, and Cardiac MRI, and a blood bank and transfusion medicine unit. Rela Hospital also has an automated laboratory, an endoscopy unit, and one of India’s ERCP & EUS suites.
