= India Home Health Care =

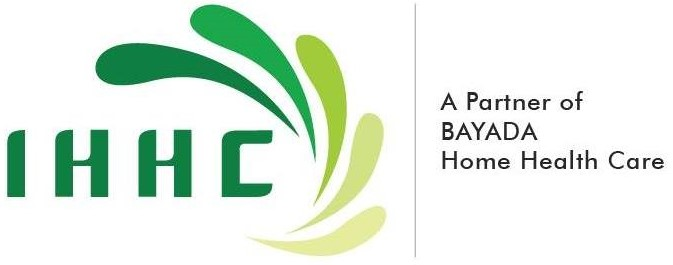
- Type: Private
- Industry: Home Health Care
- Headquarters: Chennai, India
- Area served: Chennai, Bangalore, Hyderabad, Mumbai & Pune
- Website: www.indiahomehealthcare.com

India Home Health Care (IHHC) established in 2009 by V.Thiyagarajan provides home health care and home nursing services in Chennai, Bangalore, Hyderabad, Pune and Mumbai in India. It has 800 employees, registered nurses, associate nurses and medical caretakers across these cities. IHHC announced expansion into Hyderabad & Pune in 2014.

In July 2013, the American non-profit Bayada Home Health Care acquired a 26% stake in India Home Health Care. Bayada employs over 18,000 nursing support staff in 250 offices throughout Ireland, Germany, India, the United States and South Korea. Bayada and India Home Health Care subsequently announced an investment of $10 million to create a pan India presence by 2016 with a team size of 3000 and revenue of $12 million.

== Work ==
IHHC's services cater to geriatric patients, patients with neurological disorders, orthopaedics and cancer patients. It also offers home health care for post surgical care, new born care and care for terminal illnesses. Bayada has also launched IHHC’s NRI services through its offices in the USA.
