= Billroth Hospitals =

- Billroth Hospitals

Geography
- Location: Chennai, Tamil Nadu, India
- Coordinates: 13.0757°N 80.2272°E

Services
- Emergency department: Yes
- Beds: 600

History
- Founded: 1990

Links
- Website: www.billrothhospitals.com

Billroth Hospitals is a hospital chain in Chennai, Tamil Nadu, India. It was founded by V. Jeganathan on 30 November 1990.

== Facilities ==
The healthcare facility offers a range of amenities. These include Ambulance & Emergency Services, a Critical Care Unit, Diagnostic Services featuring advanced technologies such as Dual Source CT, Dialysis, Endoscopy, and Pharmacy Services.

== Achievements ==
- Fast Track Cardiac Surgery.
  - In this 4-day fast-track surgery, Day 1 is operation, Day 2 is ICU mobilization, Day 3 is Ward care and Day 4 is the discharge of the patient.
- Bloodless Heart Surgery was performed by a team of doctors under the Chief Cardiac surgeon Dr. S Thiagaraja Murthy
  - Surgery was performed on a patient who underwent an aortic valve replacement procedure and coronary artery bypass surgery and refused a blood transfusion.

== See also ==
- Healthcare in Chennai
