= Medical tourism in India =

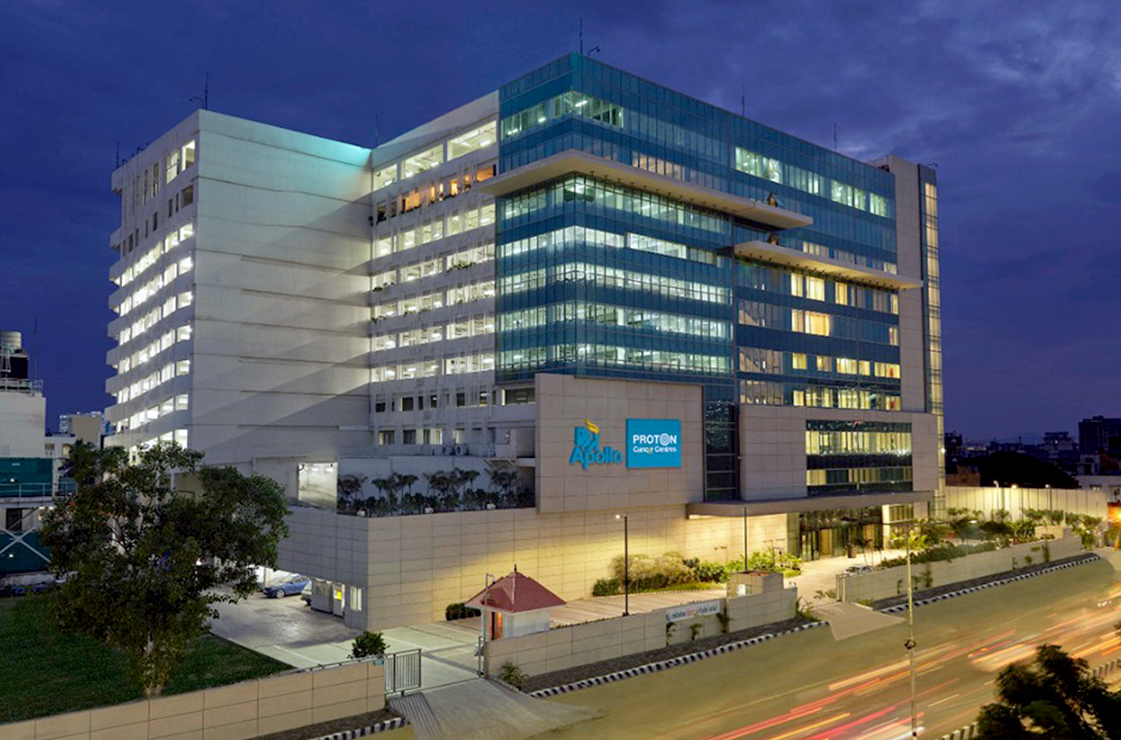
Apollo Hospitals in Chennai

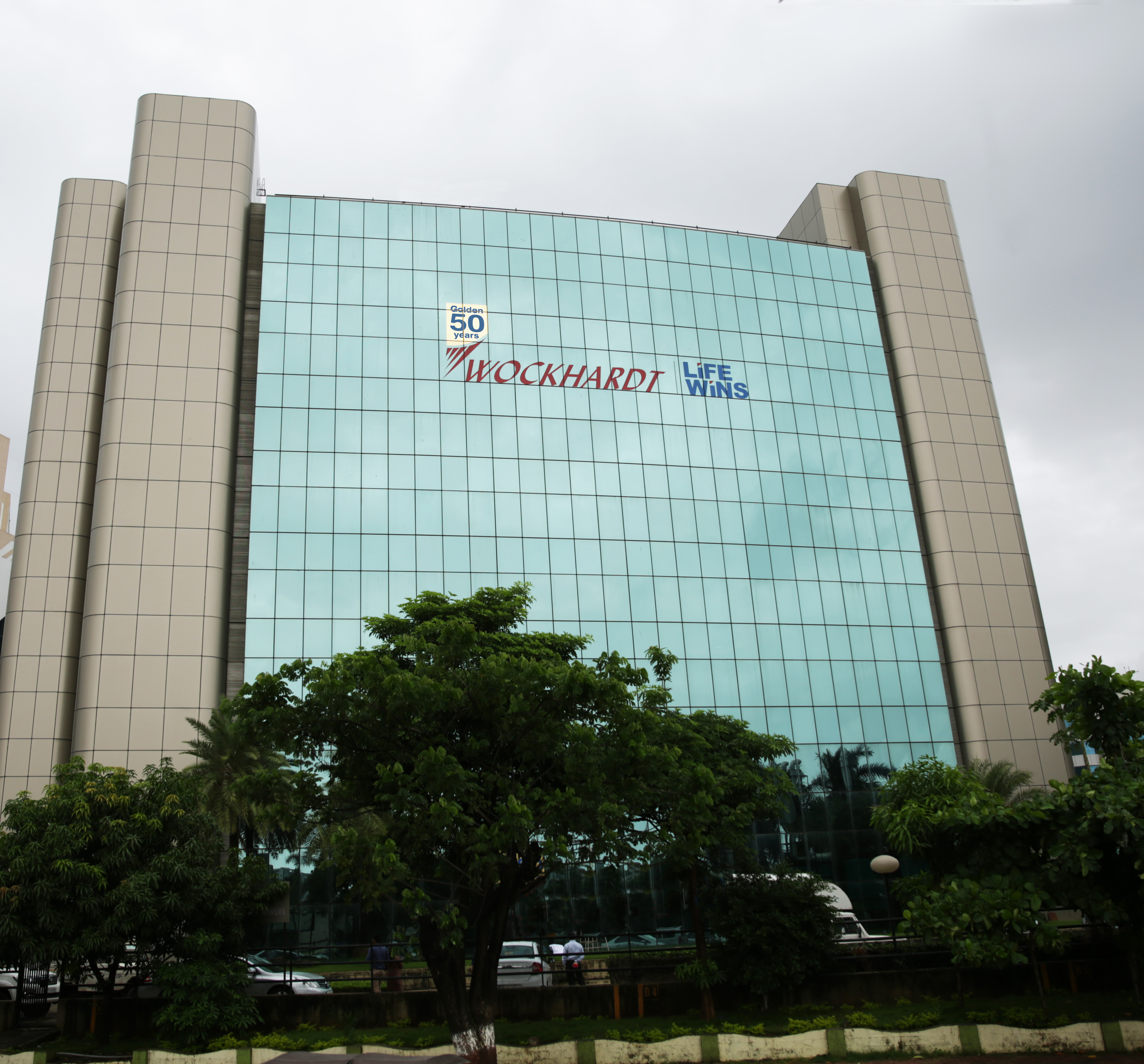
Wockhardt towers HQ of Wockhardt hospitals

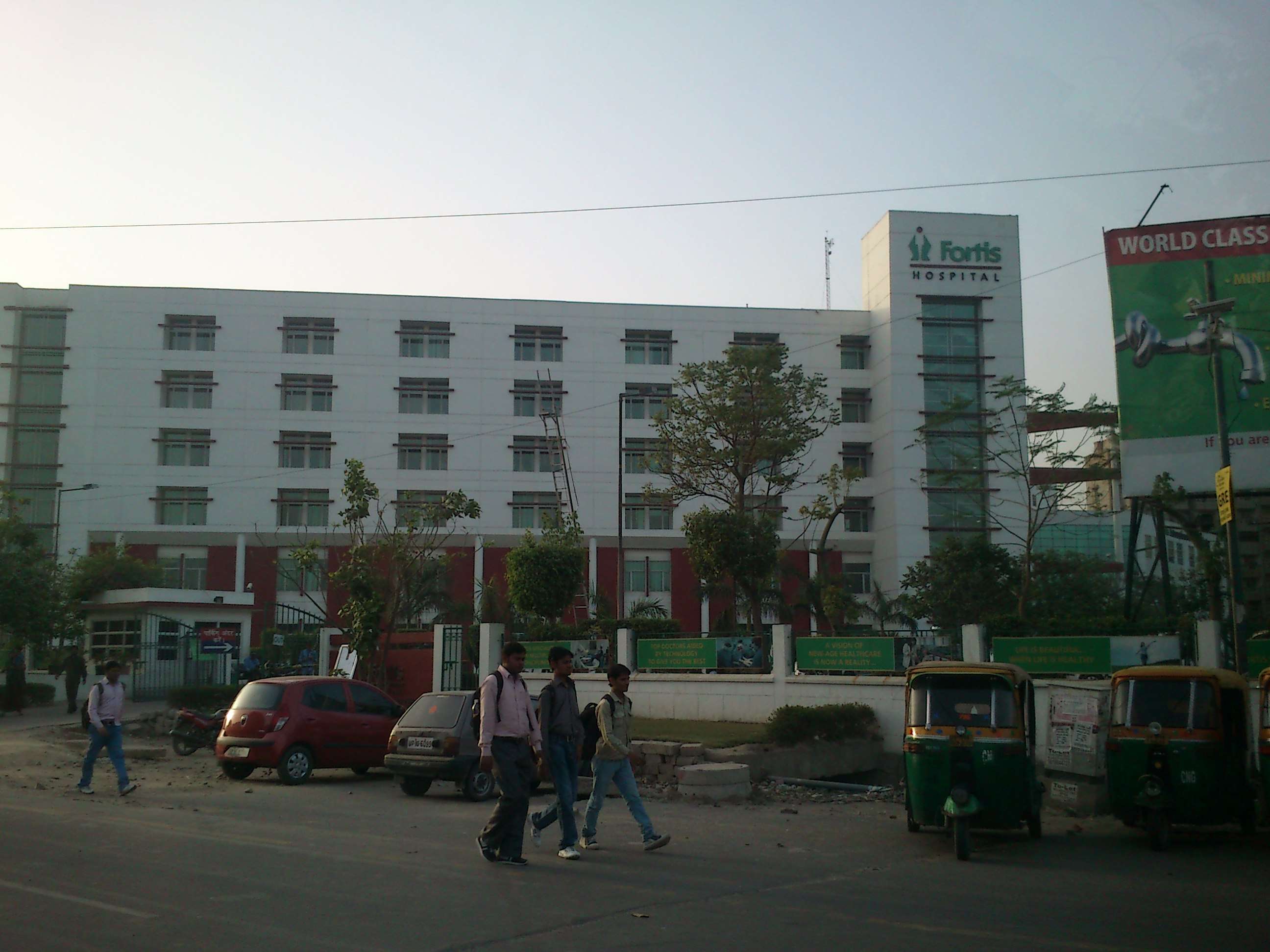
Fortis Hospital in Noida

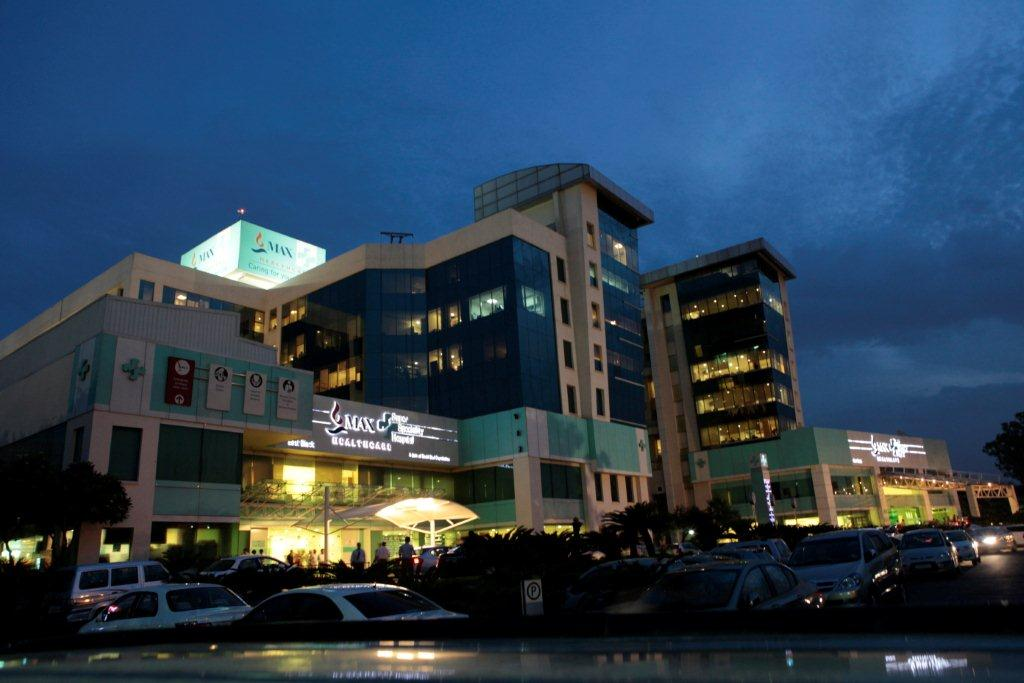
Max Healthcare in Gurgaon

Medical tourism in India is a growing sector within the country's economy. In 2022, India's medical tourism sector was estimated to be worth US$9 billion. Approximately 2 million patients visit India each year from 78 countries for medical, wellness and IVF treatments, generating $6 billion for the industry which is expected to reach $13 billion by 2026 and is backed by the Indian government's Heal in India initiative. According to a report from 2019 by the Federation of Indian Chambers of Commerce and Industry and Ernst & Young, most of the medical patients arrivals in India were from Southeast Asia, Middle East, Africa, and SAARC region. India also receives significant number of medical patients from Australia, Canada, China, Russia, the United Kingdom, and the United States. The city of Chennai has come to be known as the healthcare capital of India.

To encourage applications and ease the travel process for medical tourists, the India government has expanded its e-tourism visa regime in February 2019. The maximum duration of stay under this visa is 6 months. Since 30 August 2019, foreigners can receive any medical treatment in India with the exception of organ transplants without a medical visa.

In Aug 2023, the Government of India's Ministry of Home Affairs has announced the creation of the Ayush Visa category for foreign nationals at promoting travel healthcare in India and also and also tech-savvy companies are now stepping in to address this gap, offering online medical tourism in India.

== Attractions ==
Advantages of medical treatment in India include reduced costs, the availability of latest medical technologies, and compliance on international quality standards, doctors trained in western countries including the United States and the United Kingdom, as well as English-speaking personnel, due to which foreigners are less likely to face language barriers in India.

== Advantages ==
=== Cost ===
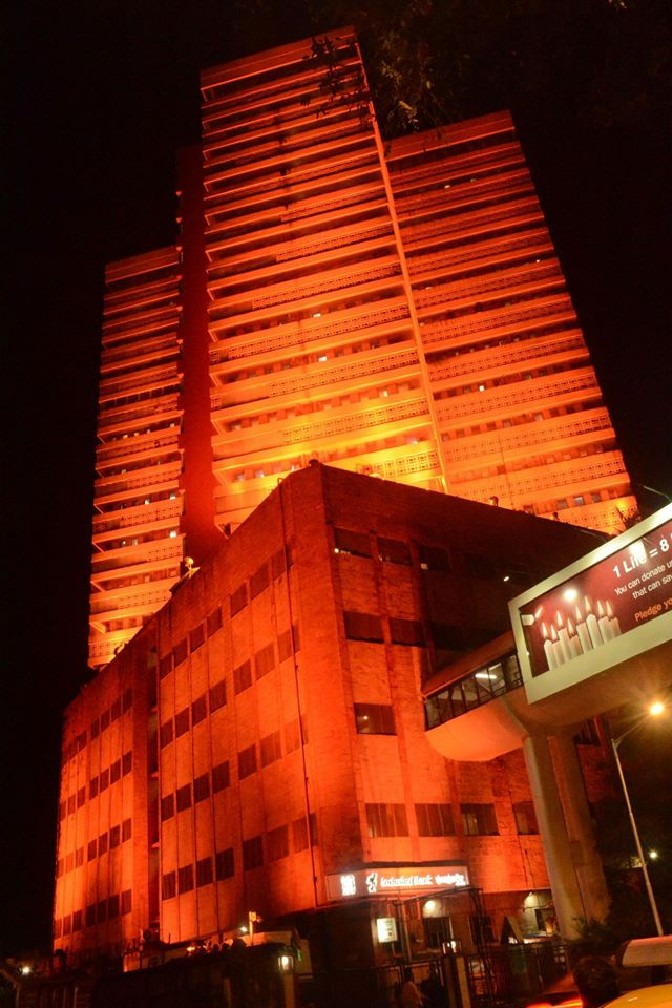
Hinduja National Hospital, Mumbai

Most estimates found that treatment costs in India start at around one-tenth of the price of comparable treatment in the United States or the United Kingdom. The most popular treatments sought in India by medical tourists are alternative medicine, bone-marrow transplant, cardiac bypass, eye surgery, and joint replacement.

=== Quality of care ===
India has 839 NABH accredited hospitals. However, for a patient traveling to India, it is important to find the optimal doctor-hospital combination. Today, many international patients are looking beyond treatment outcomes-they also value privacy, seamless coordination, premium accommodations, and a stress-free recovery environment. After the patient has been treated, the patient has the option of either recuperating in the hospital or at a paid accommodation nearby. Many hospitals also give the option of continuing the treatment through telemedicine.

The city of Chennai has been termed "India's health capital". Multi- and super-specialty hospitals across the city bring in an estimated 150 international patients every day. Chennai attracts about 45 percent of health tourists from abroad arriving in the country and 30 to 40 percent of domestic health tourists. Factors behind the tourists inflow in the city include low costs, little to no waiting period, and facilities offered at the specialty hospitals in the city. The city has an estimated 12,500 hospital beds, of which only half is used by the city's population with the rest being shared by patients from other states of the country and foreigners. Dental clinics have attracted dental care tourism to Chennai.

Private institutions and organizations such as Max Healthcare have consulted and treated up to 50,000 foreign patients in hospitals across the country.

The promotion of medical tourism in India has helped private players capitalize on this market opportunity.

According to Pankaj Chandna, Co-founder of Vaidam Health

As an industry grows bigger, it catches the attention of smart and tech-savvy entrepreneurs about how they can catch up with someone who has been running the business through traditional means for 7-10 years. That’s exactly what is happening in medical travel now.

According to Darpan Jain, Joint Secretary of the Indian government's Department of Commerce, Ministry of Commerce & Industry:

The strength of India lies in the skills of our doctors, support staff, calibre of our nurses and the state–of–the art infrastructure which has come up in the last few years, some of which are still not available even in very developed economies.

Similarly, Guneet Bhatia, founder of the medical travel platform HOSPIDIO, has emphasized:

The need for end-to-end patient coordination beyond hospital bookings, noting that international patients often require structured support across logistics, language, and post-discharge recovery.

Hyderabad, Bengaluru, Vizag, Vijayawada, Chandigarh Capital Region (CCR), Delhi NCR including

Gurugram and Faridabad, Jaipur, Kerala, Kolkata, and Mumbai are other Medical tourism hubs in India. Hisar Medicity is an upcoming hub, which was under planning and construction in 2021.

=== Ease of travel ===
The government has removed visa restrictions on tourist visas that required a two-month gap between consecutive visits for people from Gulf countries which is likely to boost medical tourism. A visa-on-arrival scheme for tourists from select countries has been instituted which allows foreign nationals to stay in India for 30 days for medical reasons. In 2016, citizens of Bangladesh, Afghanistan, Maldives, Republic of Korea and Nigeria availed the most medical visas.

=== Language ===
Despite India's diversity of languages, English is an official language and is widely spoken by most people and almost universally by medical professionals. In Noida, a number of hospitals have hired language translators to make patients from Balkan and African countries feel more comfortable while at the same time helping in the facilitation of their treatment.

A large number of medical tourism companies are facilitating foreigners, especially patients from Arabic, Russian and English-speaking countries.

== Medical statistics ==
In November 2019, a report from The Economic Times stated that of all medical tourist arrivals in India, Maharashtra receives 27%, Chennai receives around 15%, and Kerala receives 5–7% of them.

== See also ==
- Medical tourism provider
