= Sundaram Medical Foundation =

Hospital in India

Sundaram Medical Foundation (also referred to as SMF or Dr. Rangarajan Memorial Hospital) is a community-centered, non-profit, trust hospital established in 1990 by S. Rangarajan. Sundaram Medical Foundation's main hospital premises operate at Shanthi Colony in the neighborhood of Anna Nagar, while an outpatient facility operates at Elango Salai Rd., Mogappair West, Ambattur Industrial Estate, Chennai.

== Facilitation ==
Sundaram Medical Foundation offers multi-specialty medical care, including 24-hour ambulance service and emergency room facilities. It has many specialties such as

- General medicine
- General surgery
- Pediatrics
- Obstetrics and gynecology
- ENT
- Ophthalmology
- Dermatology
- Dentistry
- Family medicine
- Orthopedics
- Psychiatry
- Anaesthesiology
- Cardiology
- Oncology
- Emergency Medicine
- Endocrinology
- Hematology
- Infectious Disease
- Medical Gastroenterology
- Nephrology
- Neurology
- Plastic & Reconstructive Surgery
- Pulmonology
- Urology
- Andrology
- Vascular Surgery

Sundaram Medical Foundation offers medical education in ten post-graduate disciplines under the National Board of Examinations (through which Dip.NB is awarded). SMF maintains community health initiatives including CANSTOP, a cancer-care NGO dedicated to the memory of S. Rangarajan, educational programs for local residents in diabetes, hypertension and asthma (named STEP programs) and others.

Sundaram Medical Foundation has been supported since its inception by the Sundaram Finance Group (a former TVS group company). Rangarajan died in 1997. After his death, Sundaram Medical Foundation additionally incorporated the name 'Dr. Rangarajan Memorial Hospital'.

== Accreditation ==
SMF is accredited according to the standards of ISO:9001:2008.

- It is accredited as NABL: 15189:2007 for laboratory services in Biochemistry, Microbiology, Clinical Pathology and Histopathology.
- It is the first hospital in India to be certified with ISO/ IEC 27001:2005 – Information Security Management in Sep 2007 and upgraded to 2013 version in Sep 2015.

== See also ==
- Healthcare in Chennai
