= Madras Medical Mission =

The Madras Medical Mission

Geography
- Location: Chennai, Tamil Nadu, India
- Coordinates: 13.0859°N 80.1871°E

Organisation
- Type: 'Specialist' & 'Teaching'
- Affiliated university: Pondicherry University (MBBS, MS, MD & BSc Nursing at PIMS) & Madras University for BSc Nursing at MMM

Services
- Emergency department: Yes
- Beds: 300

History
- Founded: 1987

Links
- Website: http://www.madrasmedicalmission.org
- Lists: Hospitals in India

The Madras Medical Mission is a hospital located in Chennai. The first unit of the hospital was set up in 1987. The hospital houses 300 beds including 76 intensive care beds.

== See also ==
- Healthcare in Chennai
- Medical missions
