= Mohamed Rela =

Indian liver-transplant surgeon

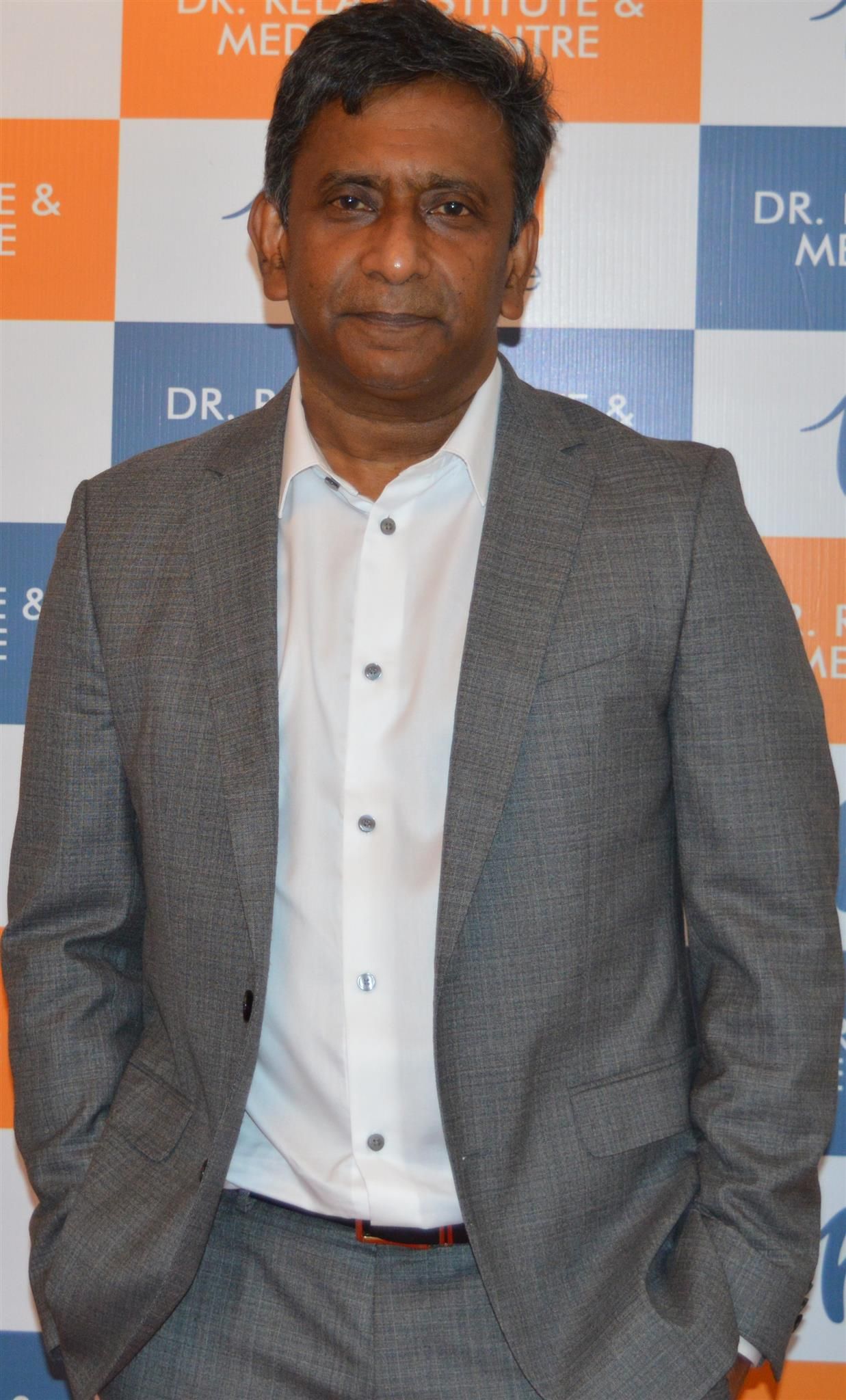
- Born: Kiliyanur, Mayiladuthurai district, Tamil Nadu, India
- Education: Stanley Medical College
- Known for: Liver transplantation Split Liver Transplantation; Auxiliary Liver Transplantation; Resection for HCC, Cholangio carcinoma, Hepatoblastoma; Pancreaticoduodenectomy
- Awards: Guinness Book of Records in 2000
- Scientific career
- Fields: Liver transplantation, Pancreatic disease
- Workplaces: King's College Hospital, London; Dr Rela Institute and Medical Centre Chennai; Institute of Liver Disease and Transplantation Chennai
- Website: www.relainstitute.com

Mohamed Rela is an Indian surgeon and expert in liver transplantation and hepatopancreatobiliary (HPB) surgery. He is considered one of the world's best liver transplant surgeons. He is in the Guinness Book of Records for performing a liver transplant on a 5-day-old baby.

He is the chairman and director of Dr Rela Hospital, India and the Professor of Liver Surgery and Transplantation, at the King's College Hospital, London.

== Education ==
Rela was born in Kiliyanur village near Mayiladuthurai in Tamil Nadu, India. His parents are S A Shamsudin and Hasma Beevi. He received his MBBS (in 1980) and MS degree from the Stanley Medical College, Chennai.

He later went to the United Kingdom in 1986, to receive another MS from Edinburgh and become a Fellow of the Royal College of Surgeons in 1988.

== Career ==
Rela worked in various hospitals in UK before joining London's King's College Hospital in 1991, where he is the Professor of liver surgery.

Rela performed over 6000 liver transplants, including one on a five-day-old baby, for which he was listed in the Guinness Book of Records in 2000.

Rela works in India and has started his own institution Dr.Rela Institute & Medical Centre - Hospital in Chrompet, Chennai, India in 2018 where he set up a Living Donor Liver Transplant program performing over 300 liver transplants a year.
