= Government Royapettah Hospital =

- Government of Tamil Nadu

Geography
- Location: 1 Westcott Road, Royapettah, Chennai, Tamil Nadu, India
- Coordinates: 13.055285°N 80.264850°E

Organisation
- Care system: Public
- Type: Full-service medical center
- Affiliated university: Directorate of Medical Education

Services
- Beds: 712

History
- Founded: 1911

Links
- Website: http://royapettahhospital.com/

Government Royapettah Hospital is a major state-owned hospital situated in Royapettah in Chennai, India. The hospital with 712 beds is funded and managed by the state government of Tamil Nadu. It was founded in 1911 and is attached to Directorate of Medical Education. It is the city's largest peripheral hospital, and its limit extends up to Chengalpattu.

== History ==
The Government Royapettah Hospital was opened in 1911. The first superintendent of the hospital was Col. C. Donovan. The cancer treatment centre at the hospital's annexure building was constructed for ₹ 170 million. The centre is the first exclusive government-run facility for cancer care in the state.

The hospital is the second in the government sector, after the Rajiv Gandhi Government General Hospital, to have a full-fledged emergency department, which includes triage area, resuscitation bay and colour-coded zones, per the Tamil Nadu Accident and Emergency Care Initiative (TAEI) guidelines.

In 2021, the hospital performed its first tumor-removal keyhole surgery.

== Future developments ==
In 2011, as part of its centenary celebration, the Central Government funded the hospital a sum of ₹ 43.5 million to construct two additional floors in its Accident and Trauma Block. There was also a proposal for setting up a "Zero Delay Ward". The state government funded ₹ 10 million on the new surgical block. The casualty ward is already under renovation.

== See also ==
- Healthcare in Chennai
- Government General Hospital
- Kilpauk Medical College
- Stanley Medical College
- Government Hospital of Thoracic Medicine
- Adyar Cancer Institute
- National Institute of Siddha
