= Orthopaedic sports medicine =

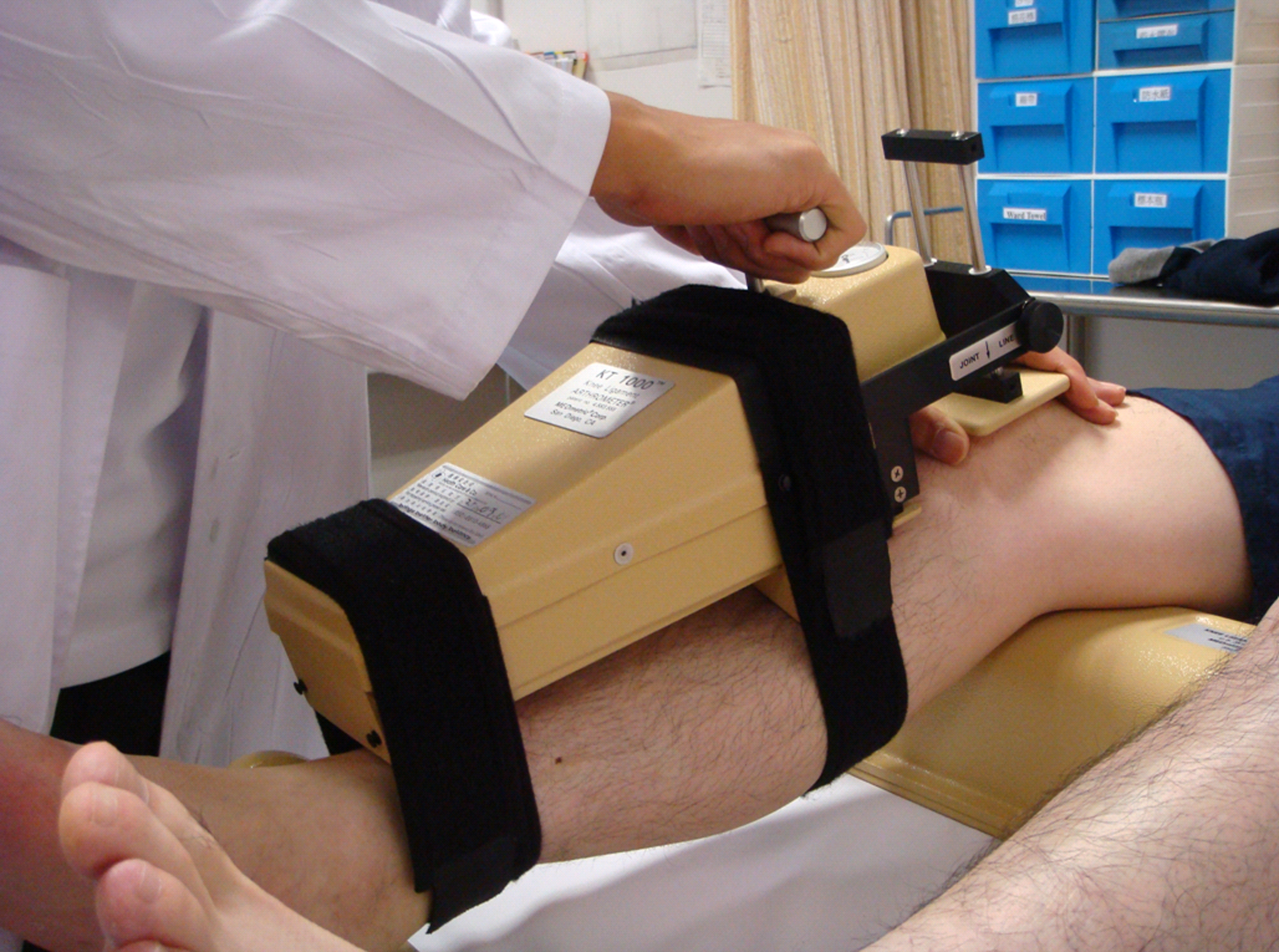
- Orthopaedics is a large part of sports medicine, and knee injuries a common theme. Here a subject is having the anterior-posterior laxity of his knee tested.
- System: Musculoskeletal
- Focus: Sports especially athletics
- Significant diseases: Trauma; Sports injuries
- Significant tests: Musculoskeletal tests
- Specialist: Orthopaedic sports physician
- Glossary: Glossary of medicine

Orthopaedic sports medicine is a combined subspecialty of orthopaedic medicine and sports medicine. The word orthopaedic derives from "ortho" which is the Greek root for "straight" and "pais" which is the Greek root for child. During the early history of orthopaedic medicine, orthopaedists used braces, among other things, to make a child "straight."

== Subspecialty: Orthopaedic Sports Medicine ==
The phrase "sports medicine" is not specific to one career or profession. Instead, it encompasses a group of professionals from various disciplines whose focus is the health of an athlete. Athletes can be all ages and play on all different levels (youth, high school, collegiate, recreational, and professional).

Orthopaedic sports medicine is the investigation, preservation, and restoration by medical, surgical, and rehabilitative means to all structures of the musculoskeletal system affected by athletic activity.

== Schooling ==
A person interested in becoming an orthopaedic sports medicine specialist must complete four years of medical school. After their undergraduate schooling is completed, training continues with a five year residency in orthopaedics. In order to sub-specialize, which is the case with an orthopaedic sports medicine, a one-year fellowship is required, although some programs extend two to four years.

After they have finished their training and have graduated from an accredited residency, orthopaedic surgeons are eligible to become certified by the American Board of Orthopaedic Surgery (ABOS). Certification by the Board is required in order to practice. In addition, the orthopaedist who plans on specializing in sports medicine must complete certification in the sports medicine sub-specialty which is administered by the ABOS. Education does not stop there; orthopaedists are required to take continuing education classes to maintain their license.

== Careers ==
Orthopaedist specializing in sports medicine have various options of employment: from serving as a team’s physician (high school, college, and professional), to running a private practice, to working in the academic setting.

According to a salary.com, the data they collected from HR reported data in August 2008 showed that an orthopaedic surgeon, on average, made about $606,307 a year not including bonuses and benefits.
