= Kiliyanur =

Kiliyanur Kiliyanur
- village
- Interactive map of Kiliyanur
- Coordinates: 12°7′0″N 79°45′0″E
- Postal code: 604102

Kiliyanur is a village in Villupuram district, Tamil Nadu, India.

== Geography ==
It is located at 12°7′0″N 79°45′0″E at an elevation of 17 m from MSL.

== Location ==
ECR passes through Kiliyanur. Nearest airport is Trichy International Airport.
