= Bayada Home Health Care =

American health care company

BAYADA Home Health Care
- Formerly: BAYADA Nurses, RN Homecare
- Type: Nonprofit
- Industry: Home health care
- Founded: Philadelphia, Pennsylvania, United States (January 17, 1975)
- Founder: J. Mark Baiada
- Headquarters: Moorestown, New Jersey, United States
- Number of locations: 367 (As of 2018)
- Area served: Eastern, Midwest, and Southwestern United States; Hyderabad, India; Ireland, South Korea, Germany
- Key people: David Baiada, CEO
- Production output: 950,823 clients served (As of 2018)
- Services: Pediatric and adult home health care, hospice, behavioral health and rehabilitation
- Number of employees: 26,000+ (As of 2018)
- Subsidiaries: Bayada Foundation, BAYADA Home Care
- Website: bayada.com

Bayada Home Health Care (stylized BAYADA) is an international nonprofit home health care provider. Founded in 1975, Bayada has more than 360 offices in 23 states, with locations in Germany, India, Ireland, New Zealand, and South Korea.

Originally a provider of home health aide services (also known as assistive care, or personal care services), Bayada expanded its services to include additional home health care services for people of all ages and abilities.

However, some patients' experience has included ER visits to correct mistakes and oversights made by incompetent nursing staff. The company is also not equipped to address emergencies after hours, even those resulting from nursing staff errors.

== Company overview ==
Headquartered in suburban Philadelphia, PA, USA, with a Global Support Center in Pennsauken, NJ, Bayada Home Health Care employs more than 28,000 nurses, home health aides, therapists, medical social workers, and other home health care professionals as well as business support staff. In May 2019, Bayada reached a milestone of serving its one millionth client.

Bayada provides nursing, rehabilitative, therapeutic, hospice, and assistive care services to children, adults, and seniors. In some states, BAYADA offers behavioral health and habilitation services.

== History ==
On January 17, 1975, Bayada Home Health Care was established as RN Homecare, by J. Mark Baiada in Philadelphia, Pennsylvania. In 1983, the name of the company was changed to Bayada Nurses. On the company's 37th anniversary, Bayada Nurses rebranded as BAYADA Home Health Care.

In 2011, the company was awarded the HomeCare Elite Award and the Pennsylvania Homecare Association Award.

As of 2026, Bayada Home Health Care operates in 22 US states. It also owns part of a home health business in India. The company employs more than 35,000 nurses, home health aides, therapists, medical social workers, and other workers. The company ranks as #14 on the list of largest employers in Philadelphia and has been on. The privately held company stated 2018 revenue of $1.3B. In 2018, Forbes magazine named Bayada a "Forbes Best Employer for New Grads 2018".

=== Nonprofit transition ===
On August 17, 2017, Mark Baiada retired as CEO of Bayada and announced that his family would gift their privately owned business to transition into a nonprofit organization by January 2019. On the same date, Mark’s son David Baiada, who has worked in the company since 2002, assumed the position of CEO, and Mark Baiada became Chair of the new nonprofit’s Board of Trustees. On December 31, 2018, Bayada officially transitioned from a family-owned, for-profit company to a nonprofit organization.

== Accreditation ==
Bayada Home Health Care is CHAP-accredited for delivering home health care.

Bayada's Pediatric RN Residency Program is the only one in-home care accredited with distinction by the American Nurses Credentialing Center (ANCC).

== Innovations ==
In 1998, Bayada launched BAYADAbility Rehab Solutions, the a specialized in-home rehabilitative nursing program for people with catastrophic diagnoses.

In 2011, Bayada launched a simulation (SIM) lab training program in-home care, subsequently offered in more than 50 locations.
