= Rajiv Gandhi Government General Hospital =

Coordinates: 13°4′53.1″N 80°16′37.9″E

- Government of Tamil Nadu
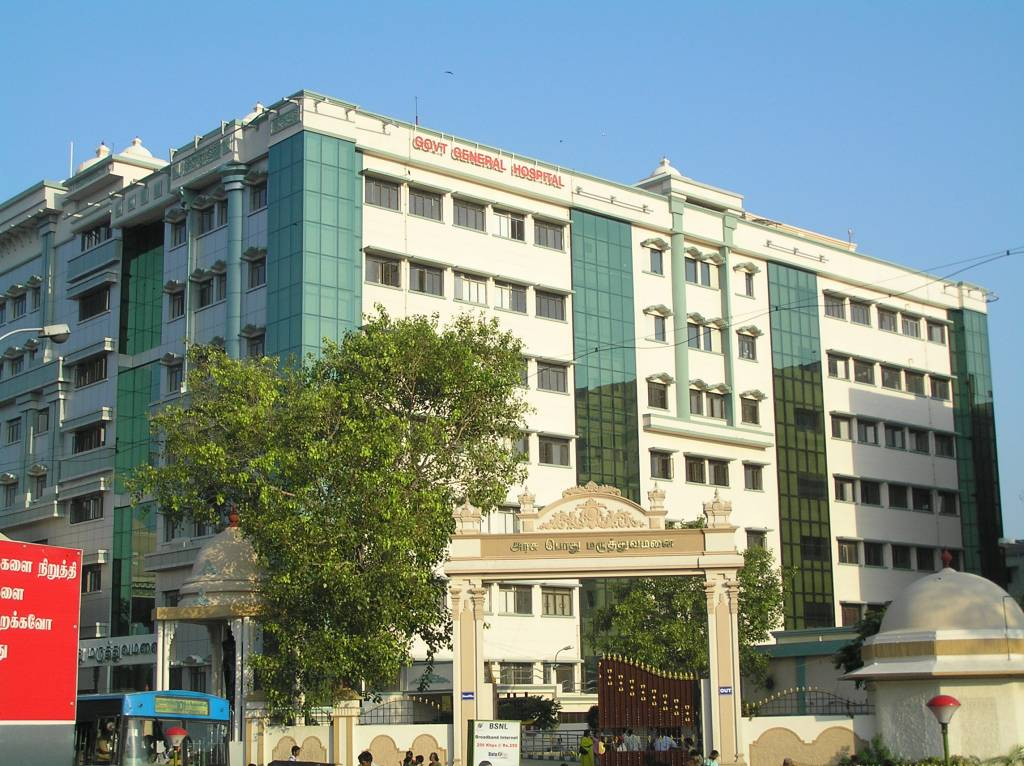
- Rajiv Gandhi Government General Hospital

Geography
- Location: Grand Western Trunk Road, Park Town, Chennai, Tamil Nadu, India

Organisation
- Care system: Public
- Type: Full-service medical center & teaching hospital
- Affiliated university: Madras Medical College

Services
- Beds: 2,722

History
- Founded: 16 November 1664; 362 years ago

Links
- Website: http://www.mmc.tn.gov.in/

Rajiv Gandhi Government General Hospital is a major state-owned hospital situated in Chennai, India. The hospital is funded and managed by the state government of Tamil Nadu. Founded in 1664 by the British East India Company, it is the first modern hospital in India. In the 19th century, the Madras Medical College joined it. As of 2018, the hospital receives an average of 12,000 outpatients every day.

== History ==
The Government General Hospital was started by 16 November 1664 as a small hospital to treat the sick soldiers of the British East India Company. Sir Edward Winter, who was the agent of the company, was instrumental in the establishment of the first British Hospital at Madras.

In its early days, the hospital was housed at the Fort St. George and in the next 25 years, it grew into a formal medical facility. Governor Sir Elihu Yale (the initial benefactor of the world-renowned Yale University) was instrumental in the development of the hospital and gave it new premises within the Fort in 1690.

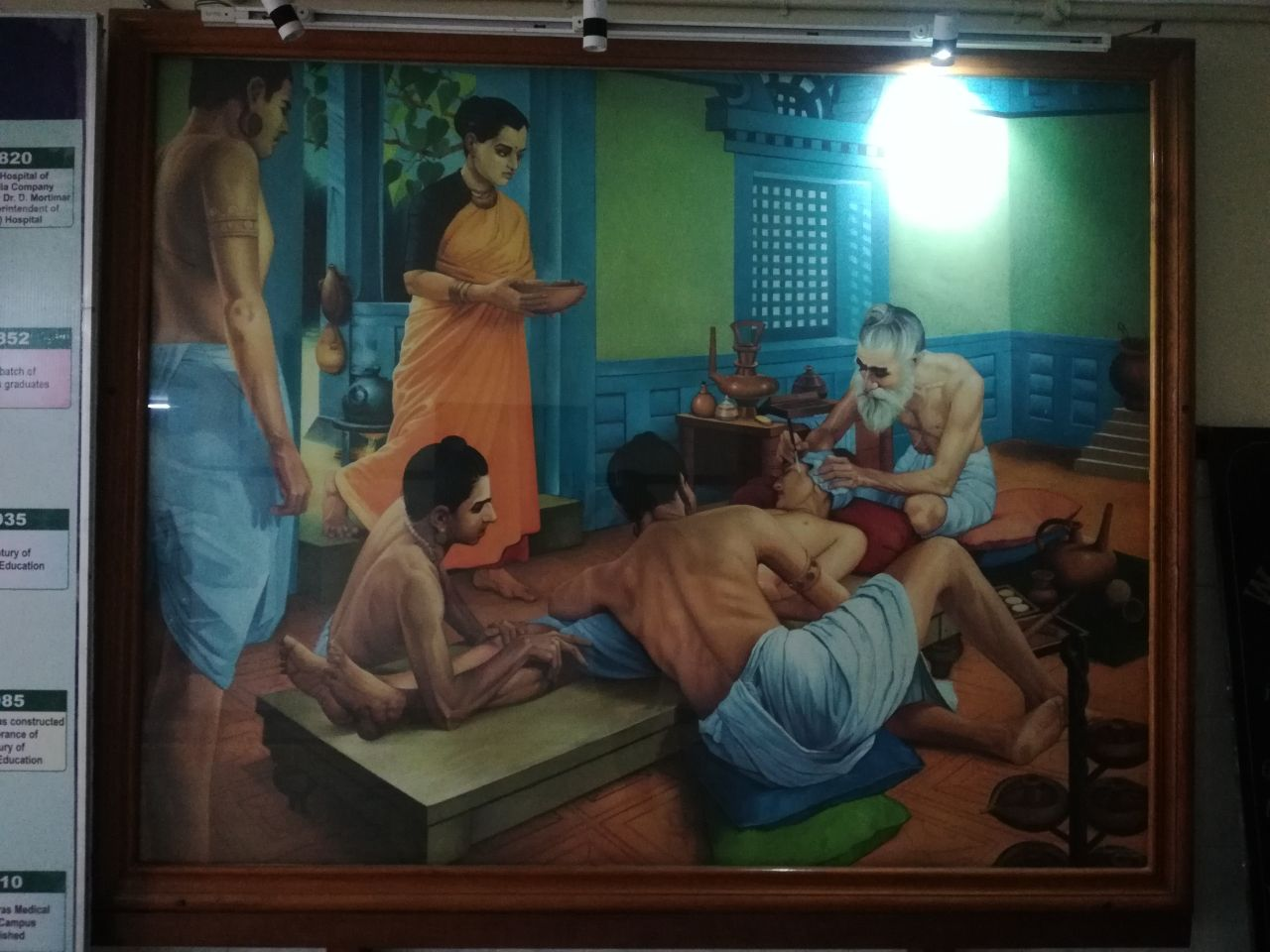
Art of a surgery in progress in ancient India, on display at the hospital

The hospital moved out of the fort after the Anglo-French War and it took 20 years before it could settle in the present permanent place in 1772. By 1771, the new location for the hospital, which until then was located on Armenian Street, was finalized—the land on which the East India Company's Garden House stood in the 1680s on the lower slopes of Nari Medu (literally "Hog's Hill") (the area around present-day Chennai Central). New building at this site was constructed by John Sullivan at a cost of 42,000 pagodas and the hospital at the present-day site was formally opened on 5 October 1772. Between 1664 and 1772, the hospital had been moved nine times.

By 1772, the hospital was training Europeans, Eurasians and natives in Western methods of diagnosis and treatment and methods of preparing medicines. These trained personnel were posted to various dispensaries in the district headquarters of the then Madras Presidency to assist the qualified doctors. Subsequently, the hospital was turned into Garrison Hospital in 1814. By 1820, the institution had the recognition as the model hospital of the East India Company. In 1827, D. Mortimar was appointed as the superintendent of the hospital.

The Madras Medical College started off as a private medical hall run by Mortimar, and was regularised into a medical school in 1835, which was opened by the governor, Sir Frederick Adams. The governor then promulgated an ordinance to make the school a state-sponsored one and attached it to the General Hospital.

In 1842, the H-shaped main building was constructed, and the hospital was opened to Indians. Simultaneously, the medical school was upgraded to Madras Medical College and started functioning from 1850. Between 1928 and 1938, the hospital was expanded to a great extent owing to the growing number of patients. A. L. Mudaliar was appointed as the first Indian principal of Madras Medical College. Since 1935, with the creations of various departments, new buildings were constructed and the Public Works Department started maintaining the hospital. By the end of the 20th century, the government decided to demolish the old building and replace it with two tower blocks at a cost of ₹ 1,050 million.

On 10 July 1987, the first ever transplant surgery in the hospital was done. The first successful cadaver renal transplantation was performed at the hospital in January 1996.

In April 2007, the government decided to open pay-and-use wards with 200 beds and own nurses, to be maintained by the Tamil Nadu Medical Commission, at the hospital.

In March 2013, a new kidney dialysis centre with 12 machines was commissioned at the hospital at a cost of ₹ 10 million.

== Infrastructure ==
As the city of Chennai falls under seismic zone III, the structure is designed to be quake-resistant. A framed structure with pile foundation is used in the superstructures. The tower blocks are constructed with structural glazing, aluminium composite panel cladding and Novakote finish.

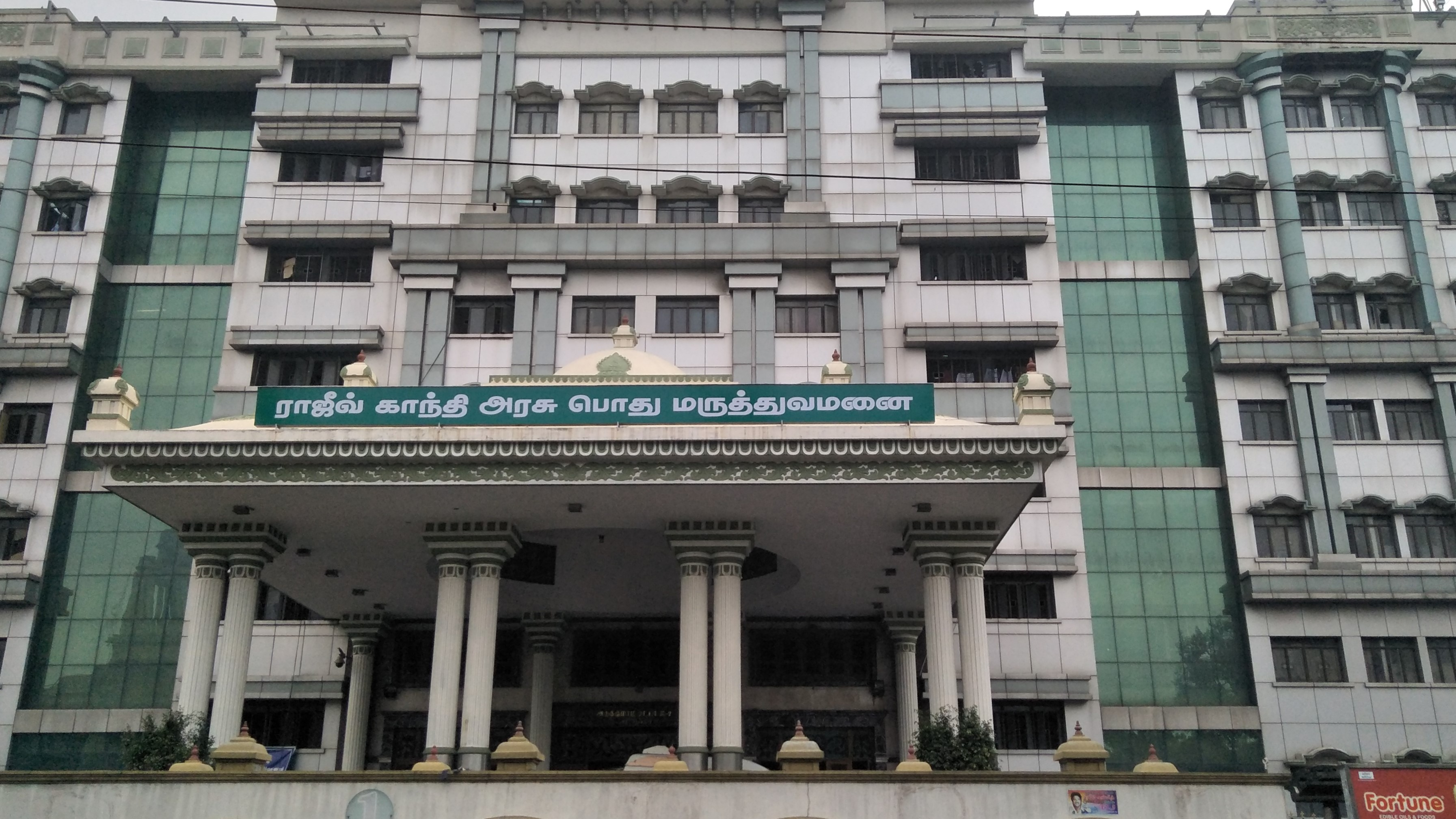
Main facade of the hospital

The total plinth area of Tower Block I is 31,559 square metres and Tower Block II is 33,304 square metres. The ground level is raised up to 1.40 metres (4 ft 7 in) to avoid water stagnation and to allow gravity flow of rainwater. Each tower block has three staircases and eight lifts and the building has a ramp with access to all floors. A separate fire-escape staircase and garbage disposal lift are found at the rear side of the building. Construction of an eight-storey block to house 23 outpatient departments began in August 2016 at a cost of ₹ 1014.5 million. It will add to the hospital an additional 432,000 square feet when it is opened in July 2019. The new block will have four bed-cum-passenger elevators and four passenger elevators.

The building has a 1,000 KVA generator with automatic main failure panel. An air-conditioning plant caters to the needs of operation theatres, ICUs, IMCUs, blood bank and special wards. A digital EPABX system has been installed with battery power backup.

The hospital has 52 operation theatres, besides intensive care units and post-operative wards. The hospital requires around 1,400 cubic metres of oxygen a day, which is supplied through 1,052 outlets using cylinders. The hospital consumes around 300 oxygen cylinders every day.

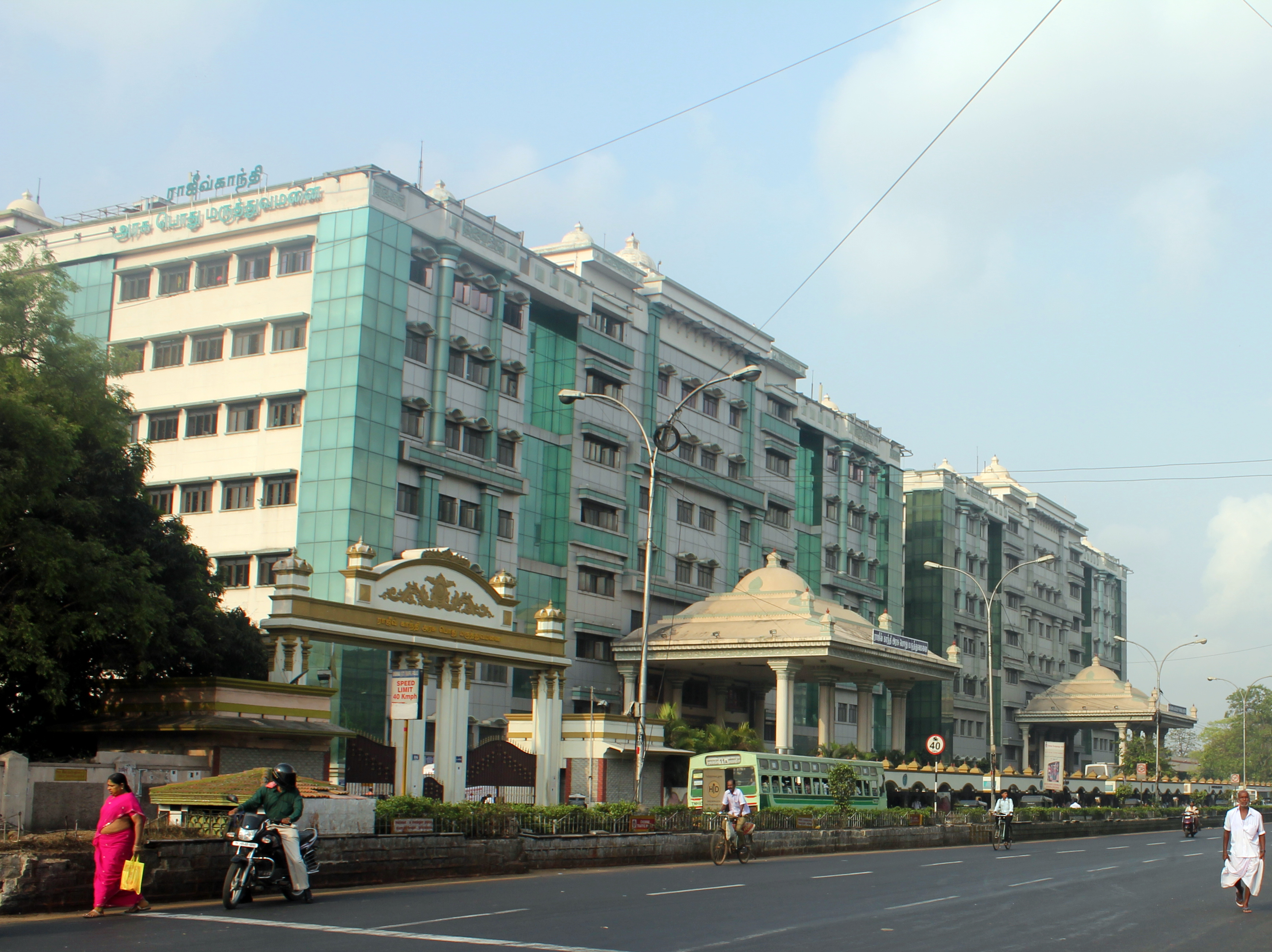
Government General Hospital, Chennai

The hospital was the first government-run institution in the state to install a tank to store liquid oxygen. The tank, with a capacity to hold 13,000 litres of oxygen, would cater to the needs of the entire hospital when it becomes operational. The tank has been installed in the space between Tower Block 2 and the old cardiology block. The tank, costing ₹ 4 million, has been built free of cost by Inox Air Products, which supplies the gas to the hospital. A full tank will ensure that supply will last for 5 days.

Dispensaries attached to the hospital include Government Secretariat Dispensary, Government High Court Dispensary, Government Chepauk Offices Dispensary, Government Estate Dispensary, and Government Raj Bhavan Dispensary.

As of 2013, there were 231 beds for various ICUs at the hospital including for poly trauma, orthopaedics, medical emergencies, poison, surgical, cardiology, neurology and geriatrics. An additional 15 beds for cancer ICU has been planned along with the commissioning of a linear accelerator for precise radiation therapy. In 2018, an integrated laboratory facility in the hospital was officially sanctioned to provide "seamless lab services".

The hospital is the first in the government sector to have a full-fledged emergency department, which includes triage area, resuscitation bay and colour-coded zones, per the Tamil Nadu Accident and Emergency Care Initiative (TAEI) guidelines.

In 2015–2016, construction of four multi-storied blocks began at a cost of ₹ 1,244.8 million. Of these, three buildings, namely, rheumatology block, nephrology block, and urology and hepatology blocks, built at a cost of ₹ 553.3 million, were completed in February 2017, March 2017, and June 2018, respectively.

== Operations ==
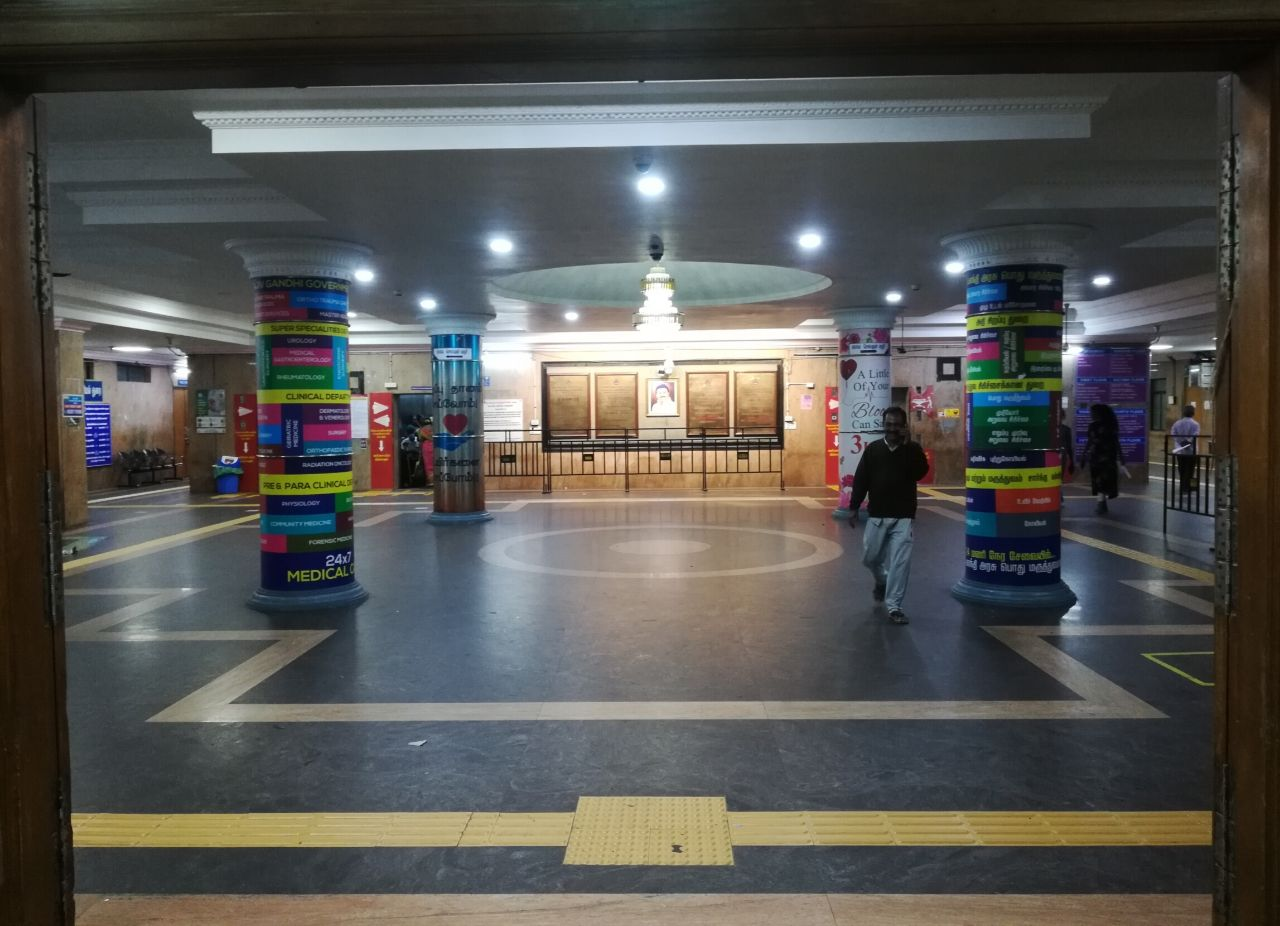
Front Lobby of Tower 1

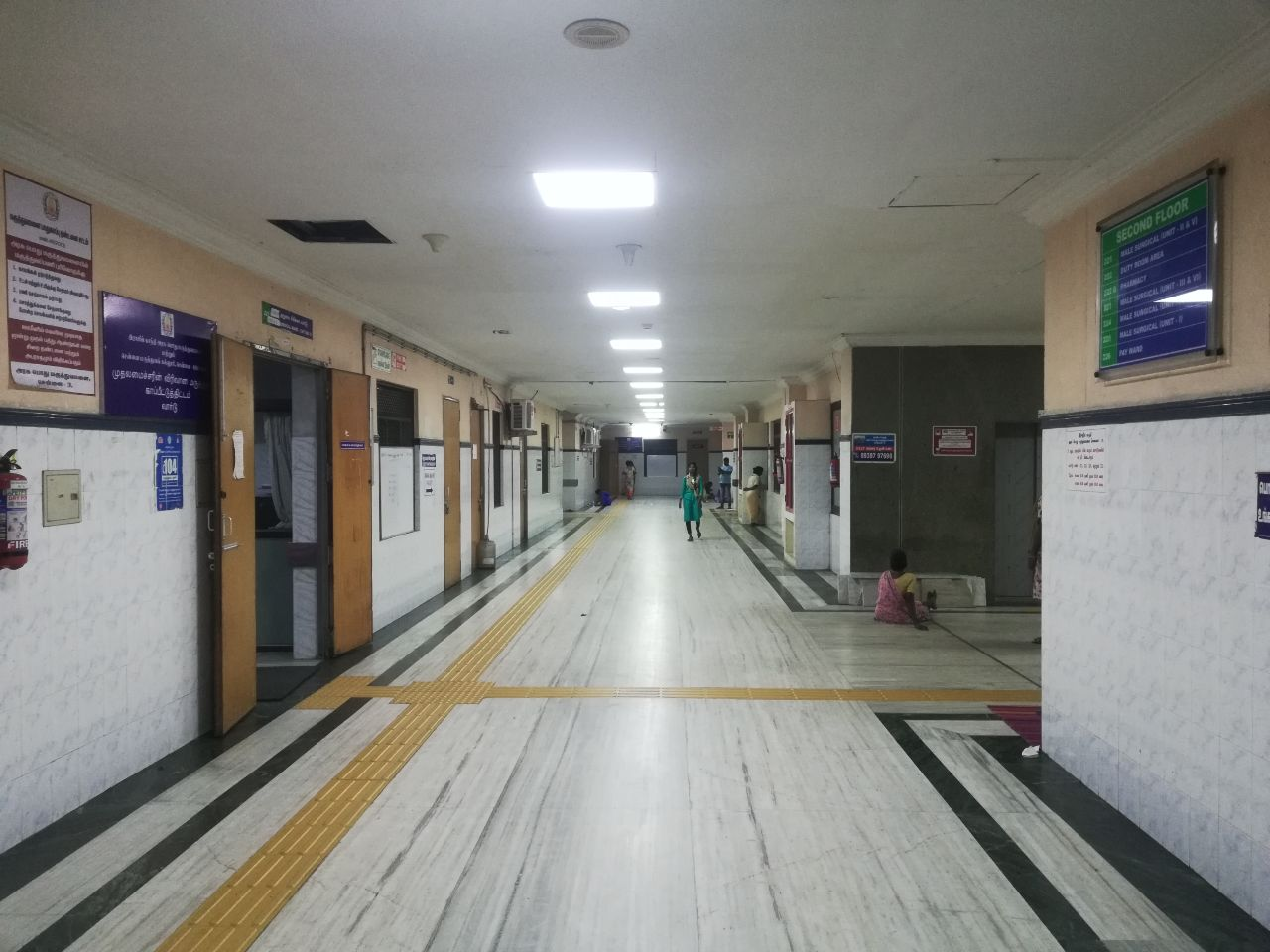
One of the many hallways at the hospital

The entire hospital block has been remodelled with the reconstruction of the massive twin towers. These replace the original hospital buildings, which were more than a century old.

While the hospital is managed by the medical superintendent, the dean is the head of the Madras Medical College (MMC) attached to the hospital.

By 2006, the hospital started treating about 8,000 to 10,000 outpatients every day. The hospital also performed three open-heart surgeries free of cost daily. By 2013, the number of outpatients per day increased to 10,000 to 12,000.

The hospital contributes to the second largest number of deceased organ donations in Tamil Nadu. In March 2012, the hospital performed its 1,000th kidney transplant, the highest in any government hospital in the country, of which about 90 were cadaver transplants. As of 2013, the hospital has a 22 percent share in organ transplants, the highest among hospitals in the city.

== Canteen ==
A corporation canteen is under construction on a 5,000 sq ft land and will be the biggest of its kind in the city. It can accommodate the 12,000 outpatients, 3,000 inpatients and thousands of staff and visitors at the hospital. The canteen is expected to open by mid-September 2013. The canteen will have ramps for disabled and possibly have separate counters for them.

== Incidents ==
On 27 April 2022, a major fire broke out at the hospital at around 11 a.m. The Bradfield Surgical Block, one of the old buildings at the hospital premises, was affected in the fire.

== Future developments ==
In March 2011, the state health department announced setting up of a genetic lab at the hospital to help in the early diagnosis of such diseases.

In June 2012, the first skywalk in Chennai connecting Chennai Central Railway Station, Park Railway Station and the hospital was planned at a cost of ₹ 200 million. It will be 1 km long, linking the hospital with nine points, including Chennai Central Railway Station, Evening Bazaar, Government Medical College and Ripon Buildings on Poonamallee High Road.

In April 2022, the government announced the construction of a new building at a cost of ₹ 650 million to replace the century-old Bradfield Surgical Block, which was destroyed by fire in the same month.

== See also ==
- Healthcare in Chennai
- Government multi-super speciality hospital
- Kilpauk Medical College
- Government Royapettah Hospital
- Stanley Medical College
- Government Hospital of Thoracic Medicine
- Adyar Cancer Institute
- National Institute of Siddha
