= Journal of Clinical Pharmacy and Therapeutics =

- Discipline: Pharmacy
- Language: English
- Edited by: A. Li Wan Po

Publication details
- Former name(s): Journal of Clinical and Hospital Pharmacy
- History: 1976-present
- Publisher: Wiley-Blackwell
- Frequency: Bimonthly
- Impact factor: 1.668 (2014)

Standard abbreviations
- ISO 4: J. Clin. Pharm. Ther.

Indexing
- CODEN: JCPTED
- ISSN: 0269-4727 (print); 1365-2710 (web)
- OCLC no.: 15466105

Links
- Journal homepage; Online access; Online archive

The Journal of Clinical Pharmacy and Therapeutics is a bimonthly peer-reviewed medical journal covering all aspects of clinical pharmacy and therapeutics. It was established in 1976 and is published by Wiley-Blackwell. The editor-in-chief is A. Li Wan Po (Centre for Evidence-Based Pharmacotherapy).

== Abstracting and indexing ==
The journal is abstracted and indexed in:

- Biological Abstracts
- BIOSIS Previews
- Current Contents/Clinical Medicine
- Index Medicus/MEDLINE/PubMed
- Science Citation Index
- Scopus

According to the Journal Citation Reports, the journal has a 2014 impact factor of 1.668.
