= National Institute of Siddha =

Medical research center in Tamil Nadu, India

- Type: Public
- Established: 3 September 2005
- Academic affiliations: Tamil Nadu Dr. M.G.R. Medical University, Department of AYUSH, Ministry of Health & Family Welfare, Government of India
- Administrative staff: 17
- Location: Chennai, Tamil Nadu, India; 12.9391°N 80.1282°E
- Campus: Urban
- Website: www.nischennai.org

National Institute of Siddha is an institute for study and research of Siddha medicine. It was established in 2005 at Tambaram, Chennai, India. It is one of the eight national institutes established across nation, for training and research in "Indian Systems of Medicine and Homeopathy education", by Department of AYUSH, Government of India,

It is affiliated to the government-owned Tamil Nadu Dr. M.G.R. Medical University and is also the national headquarters of the Central Council of Research in Siddha (CCRS), the exclusive body for Siddha research.

== History ==
In the 7th five year Plan, the Government of India then decided to establish the National Institute of Siddha (NIS) at Chennai at an estimated cost of ₹ 470 million spread over a period of 6 years. The proposal was approved, in principle, during the 9th Five Year Plan period and a society of NIS was registered in January 1999. The capital cost of ₹ 360 million was shared by the Government of India and Government of Tamil Nadu in the ratio of 60:40 and the recurring expenditure of ₹ 110 million was shared in the ratio of 75:25. The foundation for the institute was laid on 27 March 1999. The project was cleared in January 2002 and work started a year later.

The institute was established by former union health Minister Dr. Anbumani Ramadoss and inaugurated on 3 September 2005 by Manmohan Singh, Prime Minister of India.

Till 2010, the research council of Siddha was functioning under the CCRAS in New Delhi, which was established in 1978. In March 2010, the Ayush Department of the Union Health Ministry decided to bifurcate CCRAS to create an exclusive body for Siddha research called the Central Council of Research in Siddha (CCRS), after a long period of pressure from the Siddha community in Tamil Nadu and elsewhere. The new council was decided to be headquartered in Chennai, and the council was officially formed in September 2010.

== Location ==
The institute is located alongside the GST Road in Tambaram Sanatorium, about 6 km from Chennai Airport. The nearest railway station is the Tambaram Sanatorium Railway Station located about 100 m from the campus.

== Facilities ==
There is an attached hospital—Ayothidoss Pandithar Hospital, named after Ayothidasa Pandithar, a renowned traditional Siddha physician. There is an out-patient (OP) department where patients are treated free of cost. On an average, more than 1,500 patients are being treated in out-patient department every day. There is also an in-patient (IP) department with a capacity of 120 beds.

The Ayothidoss Pandithar Hospital reported around 2,174 patients per day during 2017–18, up from around 700 patients per day in 2016.

== Future developments ==
In 2010, the Archaeological Survey of India (ASI) declared the institute, (which is located on the remains of megalithic burials sites), as a protected monument, resulting in a ban imposed by the National Monuments Authority (NMA) on renovation or repairs of the existing buildings at the premises.

In May 2018, foundation stone was laid for the construction of the Central Council for Research in Siddha's headquarters. The four-storeyed building will have a total area of 1,680 square metres. A new out-patient department block with 30 consulting rooms, 20 dispensing counters and 30 external therapy rooms, and an auditorium with a seating capacity of 500 will also be built. The total cost of all these was ₹316.5 million.

== See also ==
- Healthcare in Chennai
