= K. K. Nagar, Chennai =

Neighbourhood in Chennai district, Tamil Nadu, India

K.K. Nagar
- Neighbourhood
- K.K. Nagar K.K. Nagar (Tamil Nadu) K.K. Nagar (India)
- Coordinates: 13.04005°N 80.19929°E
- Country: India
- State: Tamil Nadu
- District: Chennai District
- Metro: Chennai
- Zone: Kodambakkam
- Taluk: Mambalam
- Police Station: R7

Government
  - Body: Chennai Corporation

Languages
  - Official: Tamil
- Time zone: UTC+5:30 (IST)
- PIN: 600 078
- Vehicle registration: TN 09 (RTO, Chennai West)
- Planning agency: CMDA
- Civic agency: Chennai Corporation
- Website: www.chennai.tn.nic.in

K.K. Nagar (shortened from Kalaignar Karunanidhi Nagar) is a neighbourhood located in the southern part of Chennai, India. This is situated west of Ashok Nagar and the Chennai Airport is around 10 km southwest of this place. K.K. Nagar was a locality developed in the 1970s and early 1980s. K.K. Nagar is roughly 5 km^{2} in area. K.K. Nagar is organized by sectors and streets, and there are 15 sectors, and around 102 streets.

== Transport ==
K. K. Nagar region is connected by roads to other important localities in the city. The region has a MTC Bus terminus located on Anna Main Road, which handles about 171 services a day. Vadapalani is the nearest commercial area to K. K. Nagar. One has to travel a good 12 km to reach the Chennai Central Station (Park Town) from here. Mambalam railway station is the nearest suburban railway station to the place, located 6 km to the south east of the place. Chennai Airport lies to the southwest of K. K. Nagar and about 10 km from the place. The Chennai Metro provides connectivity to this locality to other areas in Chennai including the Central railway station and the airport. The nearest metro station is Ashok Nagar metro station.

== Characteristics ==
This region is one of the few planned townships in the city. The region is spread as a rectangular landmass with traversing roads running through the region. The locality has a number of apartments inhabited by the people living in this part of the city. It also has one of the prominent schools in Chennai, PSBB, the residents of K.K. Nagar mostly consists of the alumni and the current students. People have started many different business to take advantage of the vast population going to this school, for e.g. Tuitions, Book merchants etc. The entire region consists of 12 rectangular blocks otherwise called Sectors. In addition to these, there are nearly 105 streets distributed across the 15 sectors. The divisions are marked by straight roads running from north to south and from east to west of the region. K.K. Nagar is a well planned and designed area like Chandigarh. The 12 sectors at K.K. Nagar are developed, 3 in rows and 4 in columns. Each sector has 6 to 7 streets and a park at the middle.
