= Mambra =

- village
- Location in Kerala, India Mambra (India)
- Coordinates: 10°14′0″N 76°20′30″E
- Country: India
- State: Kerala
- District: Thrissur

Languages
  - Official: Malayalam, English, Hindi
- Time zone: UTC+5:30 (IST)
- PIN: 680308
- Telephone code: +91480
- Vehicle registration: KL-64

Mambra is a small but rich village, northern part in the Thrissur district and Southern part in Ernakulam Dt of Kerala, south India.

== Geography ==
It is situated on the border of Ernakulam district and Thrissur district, with South Mambra in Ernakulam district and North Mambra in Trichur district. The village is on the shore of river Chalakudy Puzha. The nearest villages are Karukutty, Puliyanam, Erayamkudy, koratty.

A majority of the people in this village depend on the agriculture which includes rubber, nutmeg, rice etc. Many interstate workers from Bengal and Orissa stay in this village for quarry-related works. It is blessed with lot of agriculture land, and the main channel of water from Chalakudy Puzha passes through this village. Geographically it is located higher than the other main cities in this area. Due to that, it is commonly called "Mambrakunnu".

== Nearest Attractions ==
- Nearest airport (11 km) Cochin International Airport.
- Nearest railway stations are Koratty(4 km), Karukutty(3 km), Angamaly(7 km) and Chalakudy(9 km)
- Nearest cities (7 km) Angamaly, (9 km) Chalakudy.
- Nearest town (1.2 km) Annamanada, Koratty(4 km).
- Nearest tourism (27 km) Thumpurmuzhi Gardens, (36 km) Athirapally, (38 km) Vazhachal.

== Education and Health ==
Educational and Medical Institutions including

- Union Higher Secondary School, Mambra.
- Union LPS, Mambra
- Gov Block Primary Health Centre, Mambra .
- Veterinary Dispensary, Mambra.
- P.A.T Hospital, Mambra.

== Religion and Pilgrimage ==
There are all religious believers in Mambra, that peacefully co-exists here, each faithful to their respective beliefs and customs.

Major religious centers in Mambra include

- Muhiyudhieen Jumma Masjid, Mambra.
- Maha Deva Temple, Mambra.
- St. Joseph Church, Mambra.
- St. Kuriyakose Jacobite Church, Mambra.
- Nusruthul Islam Madrasa, Mambra
- Viswakarma Temple, Mambra
- Masjidhul Badriyah, Mambra
- hidayathul islam masjid, Mambra
