= Apollo Hospitals =

Indian multi-billion dollar hospital

Apollo Hospitals Enterprise Limited
- Trade name: Apollo Hospitals
- Type: Public
- Traded as: BSE: 508869; NSE: APOLLOHOSP; NSE NIFTY 50 constituent
- ISIN: INE437A01024
- Industry: Healthcare
- Founded: 18 September 1983; 43 years ago
- Founders: Prathap C. Reddy
- Headquarters: Chennai, Tamil Nadu, India
- Areas served: South Asia, Middle East
- Key people: Prathap C. Reddy (Chairman); Preetha Reddy (Executive Vice Chairperson); Shobana Kamineni (Executive Vice Chairperson); Suneeta Reddy (Managing Director); Sangita Reddy (Joint Managing Director)
- Products: Hospitals, pharmacy, diagnostic centres, home care
- Revenue: ▲₹25,228 crore (US$2.6 billion) (FY26)
- Operating income: ▲₹3,769 crore (US$390 million) (FY26)
- Net income: ▲₹1,941 crore (US$200 million) (FY26)
- Owner: Reddy family (28%)
- Number of employees: 62,939 (2020)
- Subsidiaries: Apollo HealthCo (78.87%); Apollo Health and Lifestyle (99.4%)
- Website: www.apollohospitals.com

Apollo Hospitals Enterprise Limited is an Indian multinational healthcare group headquartered in Chennai. It is the second largest for-profit private hospital network in India after Manipal Hospitals, with a network of 71 owned and managed hospitals. Along with the eponymous hospital chain, the company also operates pharmacies, primary care and diagnostic centres, telehealth clinics, and digital healthcare services among others through its subsidiaries.

The company was founded by Prathap C. Reddy in 1983 as the first corporate healthcare provider in India. Several of Apollo's hospitals have been among the first in India to receive international healthcare accreditation by the United States based Joint Commission International (JCI) as well as NABH accreditation.

Apollo Hospitals and its subsidiaries have faced multiple allegations of overcharging, forceful transplants, and corruption.

== History ==
Apollo Hospitals was founded by Prathap C. Reddy in 1983 as the first corporate health care in India. The first branch at Chennai was inaugurated by the then President of India Zail Singh.

Apollo developed telemedicine services, after starting a pilot project in 2000 at Aragonda, Prathap Reddy's home village.

In 2006, Apollo exited its hospital in Colombo called Apollo Hospital Sri Lanka by selling its stake to Sri Lanka Insurance. In 2007, Apollo Hospitals and DKV AG established a 74:26 joint venture health insurance company called Apollo DKV Insurance Co. The company was rebranded as Apollo Munich Health Insurance in 2009.

In 2008, Apollo Hospitals started Apollo Reach, a chain of hospitals for Tier-2 and Tier-3 cities as well as semi-urban and rural areas, with the opening of the first Apollo Reach hospital in Karimnagar.

In December 2012, Apollo Hospitals sold its 38% stake in Apollo Health Street, the group's healthcare business process outsourcing division, to Sutherland Global Services for ₹225 crore (US$42.11 million).

In 2014, Apollo Hospitals acquired Hetero Med Solutions, a South Indian pharmacy chain with 320 stores, from Hetero Group for ₹146 crore (US$23.92 million) in a slump sale. The stores were rebranded as Apollo Pharmacy.

In October 2015, Apollo launched home care services under Apollo HomeCare and its digital healthcare platform called Ask Apollo.

Apollo signed an MoU with Health Education England in April 2017 to provide a large number of doctors to fill vacancies in the English National Health Service.

In September 2017, Apollo announced an academic collaboration with Australia’s Macquarie University, where students enrolled in Macquarie's four-year graduate entry Doctor of Medicine program would complete 5 months of clinical rotations at Apollo hospitals in Hyderabad as part of their degree.

In 2018, Apollo Hospitals opened their first hospital in Kerala, Apollo Adlux Hospital, a 250-bedded tertiary care center as a joint venture with the Adlux group.

In January 2019, Apollo opened Apollo Proton Cancer Centre in Chennai, which is reportedly the first proton therapy facility across South Asia, Southeast Asia and the Middle East.

In 2020, Apollo Hospitals sold its 50.80% percent majority stake in Apollo Munich Health Insurance to HDFC for ₹1,495 crore (US$201.76 million). Later that year, it acquired IHH Healthcare's 50% joint venture stake in Apollo Gleneagles Hospital in Kolkata for ₹410 crore (US$55.33 million).

In June 2025, Apollo Hospitals announced the demerger and consolidation of its digital healthcare and pharmacy businesses (Apollo HealthCo), telemedicine division (Apollo TeleHealth Services), and wholesale pharmacy distribution entity (Keimed) into a new company called Apollo Healthtech, expected to be completed before March 2027. Apollo Healthtech had a revenue of around ₹16,300 crore in financial year 2025.

In May 2026, Apollo Health and Lifestyle Limited (AHLL) sold Apollo Cradle and Apollo Fertility to Cloudnine Hospitals in a cash-and-stock deal worth ₹1,550 crore. AHLL obtained a 9.9% stake and a board seat in Cloudnine Hospitals.

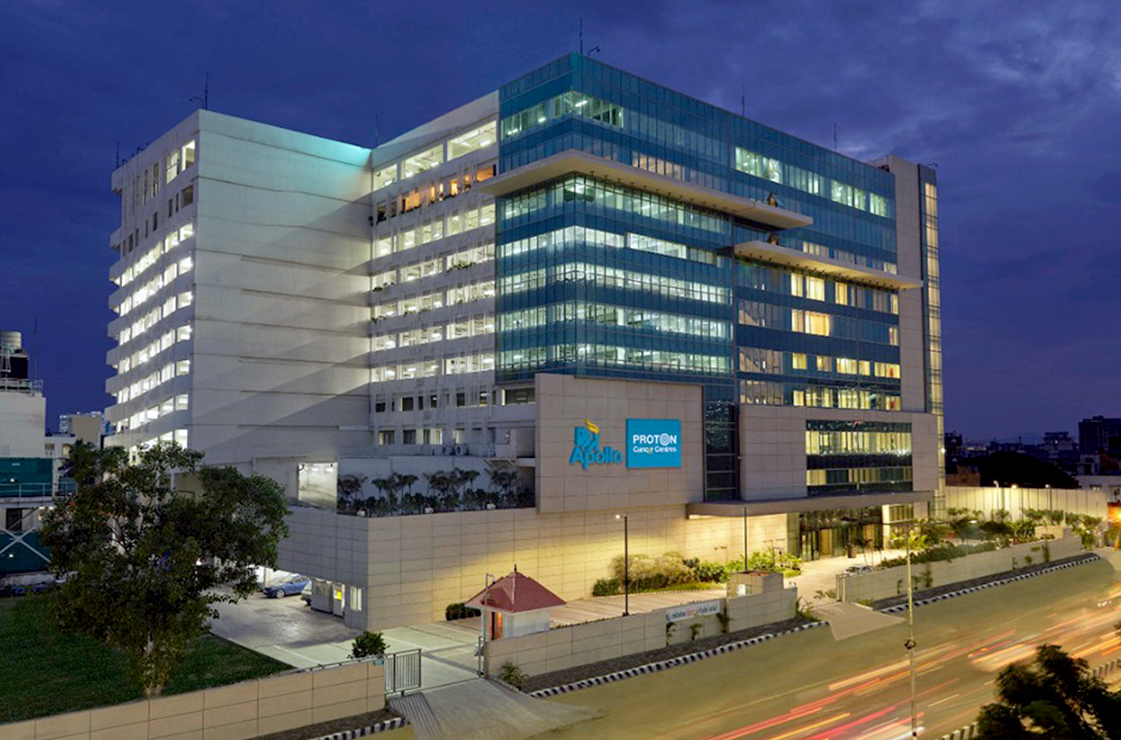
Apollo Proton Cancer Centre, Chennai

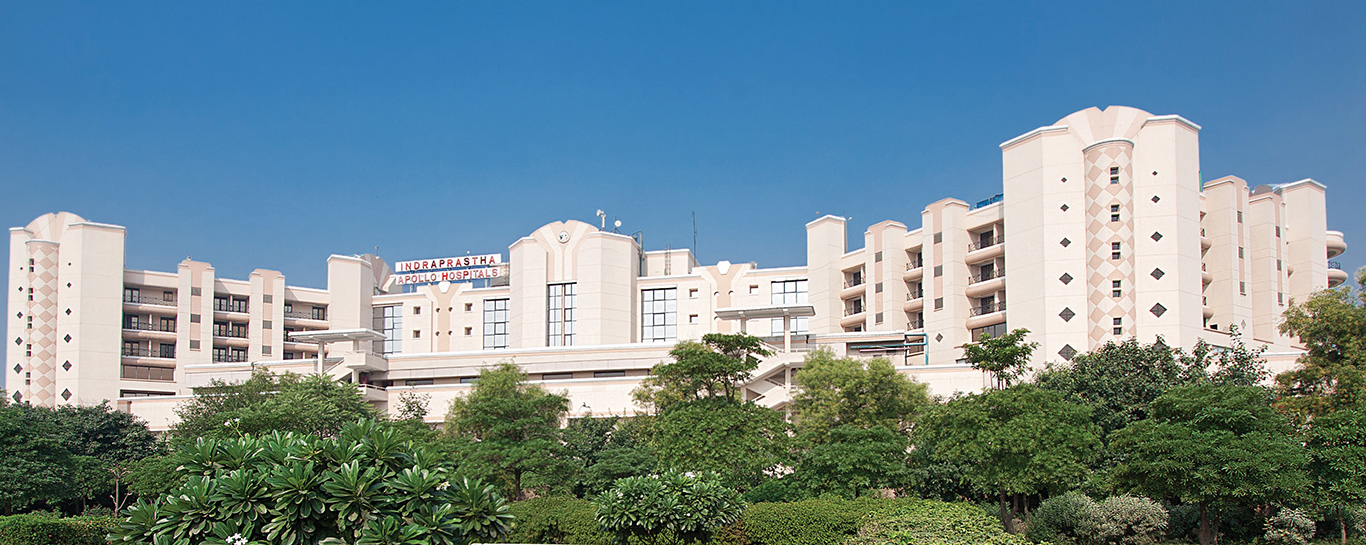
Indraprastha Apollo Hospital, Delhi

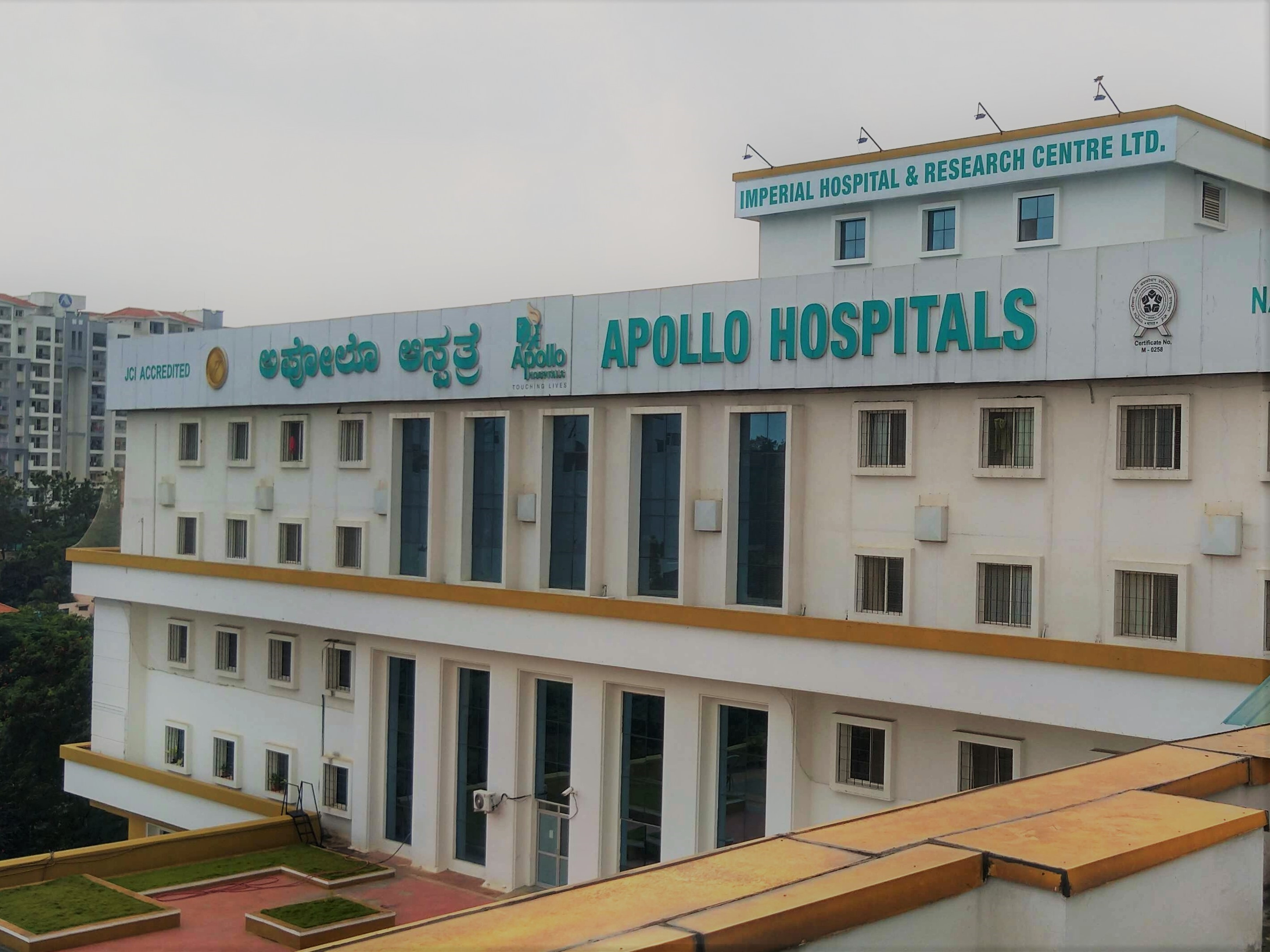
Apollo Cancer Hospital & Research Centre, Bengaluru

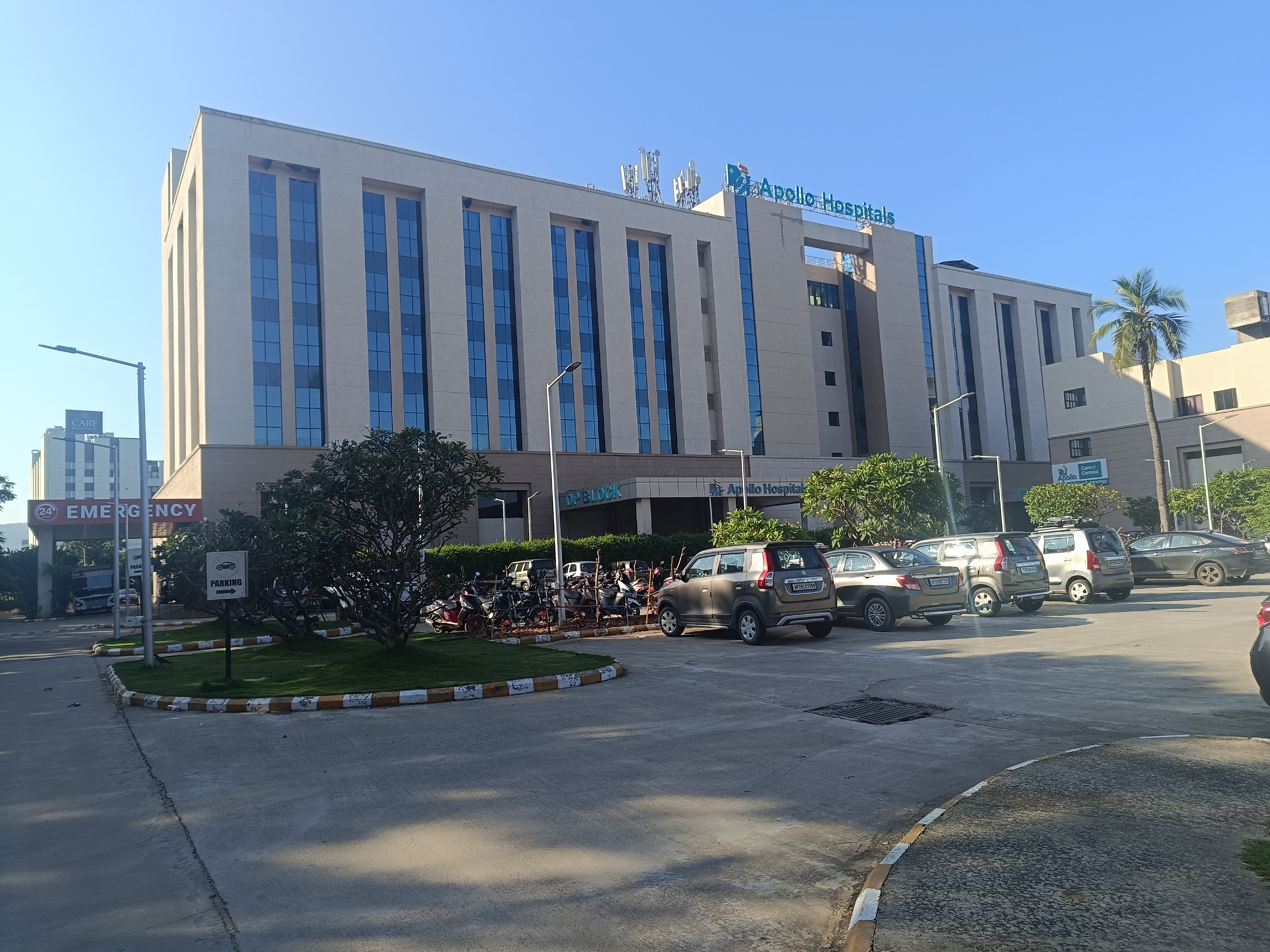
Apollo Hospitals, Visakhapatnam

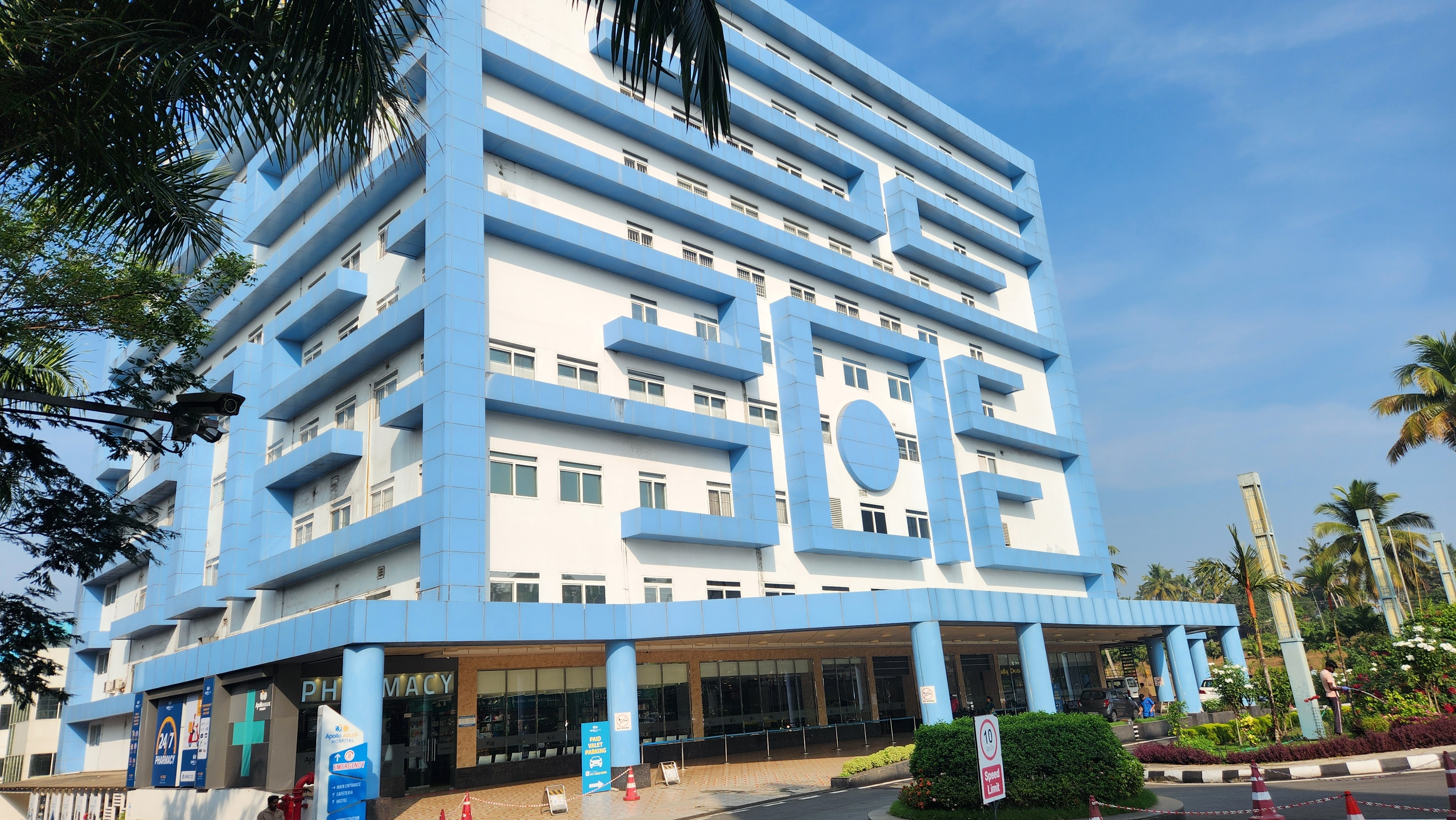
Apollo Adlux Hospital, Ernakulam

== Subsidiaries ==
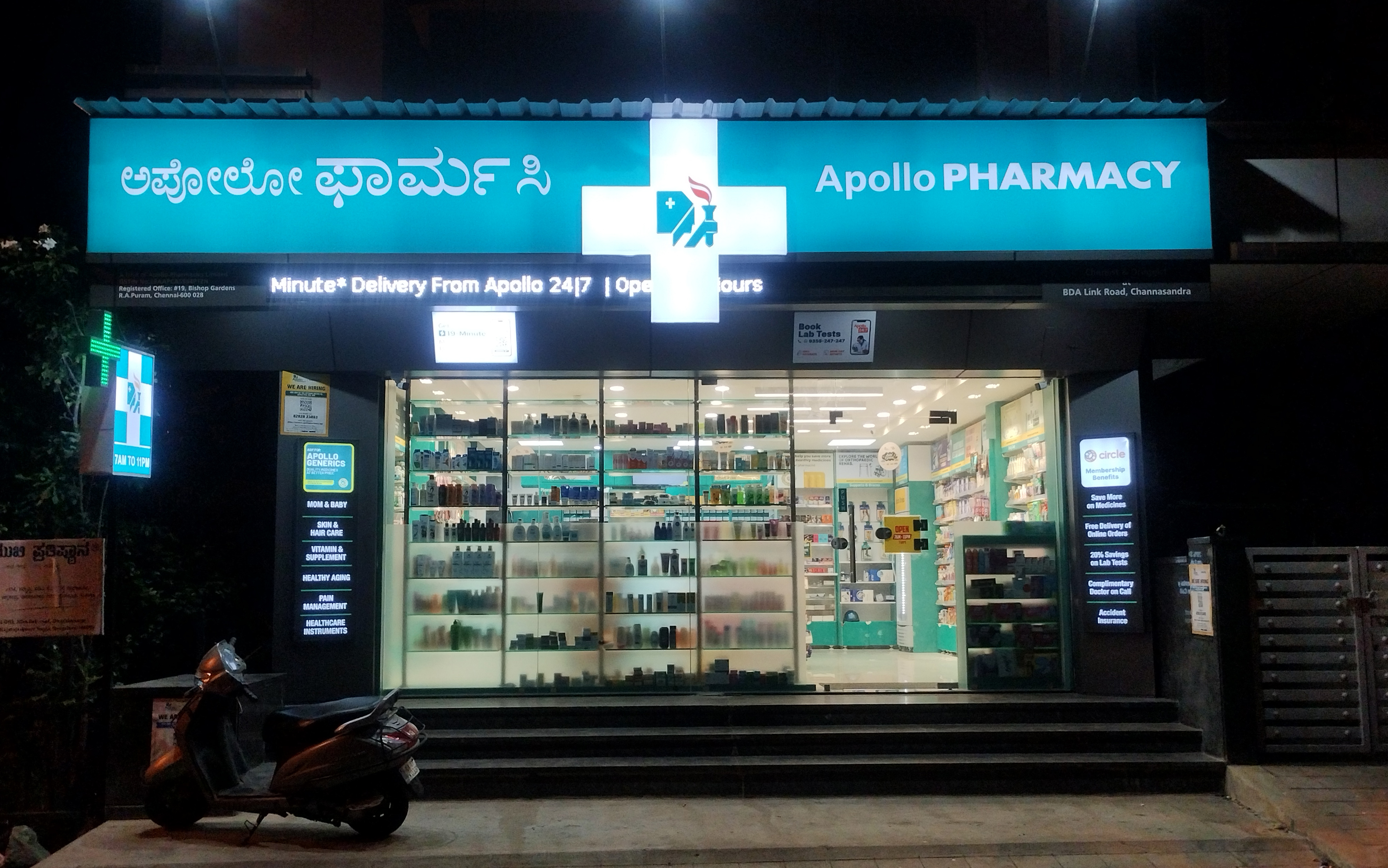
An Apollo Pharmacy store in Bengaluru

=== Apollo HealthCo ===
Apollo HealthCo was formed in 2021 with the merger of the group's non-hospital pharmacy chain Apollo Pharmacy and its digital healthcare business known as Apollo 24/7.

- Apollo Pharmacy – Apollo Pharmacy is the largest retail pharmacy chain in India with more than 5,000 stores in over 21 states. It was started in 1987.
- Apollo 24/7 – Apollo 24/7 is the digital healthcare platform of the group which was launched in 2020. It offers telehealth consultation, online medicine ordering and delivery, and in-home diagnostics among other services.

=== Apollo Health and Lifestyle ===
Apollo Health and Lifestyle is the primary and secondary care arm of the group which operates multi-specialty clinics under Apollo Clinics, diagnostics and pathology labs under Apollo Diagnostics, diabetes clinics under Apollo Sugar, dental clinics under Apollo Dental, dialysis centres under Apollo Dialysis, minimally invasive surgical hospitals under Apollo Spectra, women/children hospitals under Apollo Cradle, and fertility clinics under Apollo Fertility.

=== Apollo TeleHealth Services ===
Apollo TeleHealth Services owns the telehealth network of the group, operating via a business-to-consumer model under which it offers direct services like online consultations, appointment booking, medicine delivery, among others; a business-to-business offering to corporates for their employees; and a business-to-government agreement providing telehealth services in partnership with public health systems. Established in 1999, it is headquartered in Hyderabad and has more than 100 franchised teleclinics.

=== Research and education divisions ===
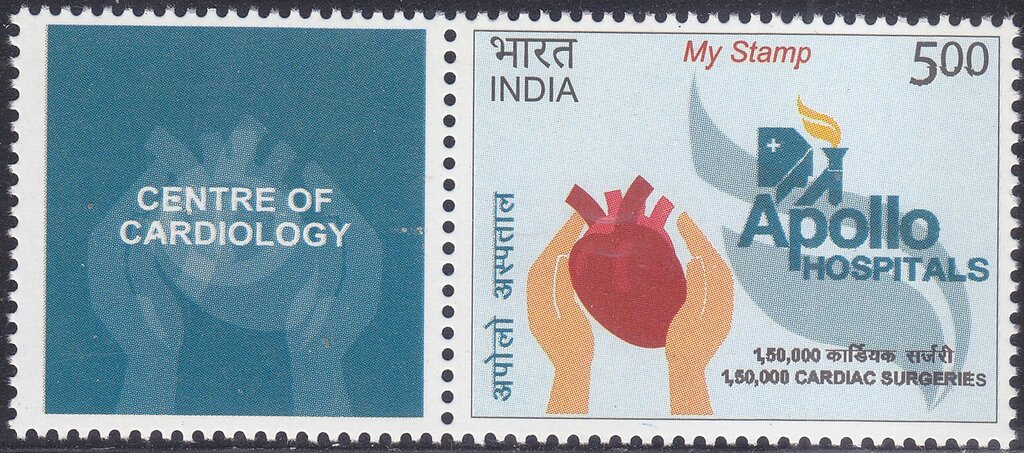
A postal stamp issued in 2019 commemorating Apollo's Centre of Cardiology.

- Apollo Research and Innovations is a research arm of the group which is involved in clinical trials of drugs, medical devices, healthcare software and consumer products. It was established in 2000 and has 17 centres at hospital locations.
- Apollo Hospitals Education & Research Foundation is a non-profit which conducts research projects in liquid biopsy, molecular diagnostics, pharmacogenomics and exosome technologies at its wet lab run by the Cell and Molecular Biology Research Centre (CMBRC).
- Apollo Medskills is a private-public partnership between Apollo Hospitals and National Skill Development Corporation started in 2012 for the development of medical skills of healthcare workforce through 40+ training institutes across the country.

== Controversies ==
In 2016, a patient died at Apollo's Bilaspur Hospital during a treatment for stomach pain. While the hospital attributed his death to poisoning, the post-mortem report remained inconclusive pending a chemical analysis. The forensic laboratory report, obtained in 2019, revealed no presence of poison. Later in 2023, four doctors were arrested but subsequently released on bail.

In a 2019 order, the Delhi State Consumer Disputes Redressal Commission (DSCDRC) found Indraprastha Apollo Hospital negligent in the treatment of a 24-year-old woman who died in 2007. As a result, the Commission directed the hospital to pay the woman's father a compensation of ₹10 lakh.

British newspaper Telegraph in a December 2023 report alleged that the chain's Indraprastha Apollo Hospital was involved in facilitating a "cash-for-kidney" racket, luring impoverished villagers from Myanmar to sell their kidneys to wealthy Burmese patients through forged documents and fabricated family ties. The report also quoted a 2016 Deccan Herald news article which stated that Dr. Sandeep Guleria was expected to be summoned for questioning in connection with a separate kidney scandal. The Government of Delhi consequently initiated an investigation against the hospital.

In March 2024, the National Consumer Disputes Redressal Commission fined Apollo Speciality Hospital in Chennai and two doctors ₹30 lakh for medical negligence. The case involved a patient who did not regain consciousness after spinal surgery in April 2015 and remained in a vegetative state until his death in April 2017.

In March 2025, the Supreme Court of India warned Indraprastha Apollo Hospital that it will direct the All India Institute of Medical Sciences to take over if free treatment wasn't provided to poor patients in accordance with the original lease agreement, wherein 15 acres of prime land in Delhi was leased to Indraprastha Medical Corporation Limited by the Delhi Government for a symbolic rate of Re. 1 per month.

== See also ==
- Healthcare in Chennai
- List of hospitals in India
