= Obul Reddy =

Obul Reddy or Obulreddy is one of the Indian names.

- Justice S. Obul Reddy was Chief Justice of High Courts of Andhra Pradesh and Gujarat and Governor of Andhra Pradesh.
- P Obul Reddy, the founder of Nippo Batteries Ltd., is an industrialist, philanthropist and patron of the arts.
