= Lanka Hospitals =

Hospital in Sri Lanka

The Lanka Hospitals Corporation PLC
- Logo of Lanka Hospitals
- Formerly: Apollo Hospitals Sri Lanka
- Company type: Public
- Traded as: CSE: LHCL.N0000
- ISIN: LK0318N00002
- Industry: Healthcare industry
- Founded: 2002; 24 years ago (as Apollo Hospital Sri Lanka)
- Founder: Prathap C. Reddy
- Headquarters: Colombo, Sri Lanka
- Area served: Sri Lanka
- Key people: P. A. Chrisantha Fernando (Chairman); Dr. Sanjaya Ratnayake (Group Chief Executive Officer/ Group Director Medical Services)
- Products: Hospitals, Pharmacy, Diagnostic Centre
- Revenue: ▲LKR10,034 million (2022)
- Operating income: ▲LKR2,233 million (2022)
- Net income: ▲LKR2,212 million (2022)
- Total assets: ▲LKR12,000 million (2022)
- Total equity: ▲LKR9,319 million (2022)
- Owner: Sri Lanka Insurance (51.34%); Fortis Healthcare International (28.66%); Property Development PLC (9.53%)
- Number of employees: 1,922 (2021)
- Parent: Sri Lanka Insurance
- Website: www.lankahospitals.com

Lanka Hospital (formerly Apollo Hospital Sri Lanka) is multi-speciality tertiary care hospital in Sri Lanka and is one of the largest private hospitals in the country. It is a subsidiary of Sri Lanka Insurance Corporation. The company's previously owned by Apollo Hospitals. It was founded by Dr Pratap C. Reddy in India. It is situated on Elvitigala Mawatha, also known as Baseline Road, which is a direct route from Colombo's international airport. It is also only a few minutes drive from central Colombo. The hospital was commissioned in 2002 as a branch of Apollo Hospitals India. The hospital was taken over by Sri Lanka Insurance in 2006. In 2009, it was renamed Lanka Hospitals after it ended a licensing and support services agreement with Apollo Hospitals.

There are approximately 350 beds at the hospital including four intensive care units (medical, cardiothoracic, renal and neonatal). The wards are divided into either individual rooms or cubicles with six beds each, depending on the patients' choice.
