= Apollo Adlux Hospital =

- Apollo Hospitals
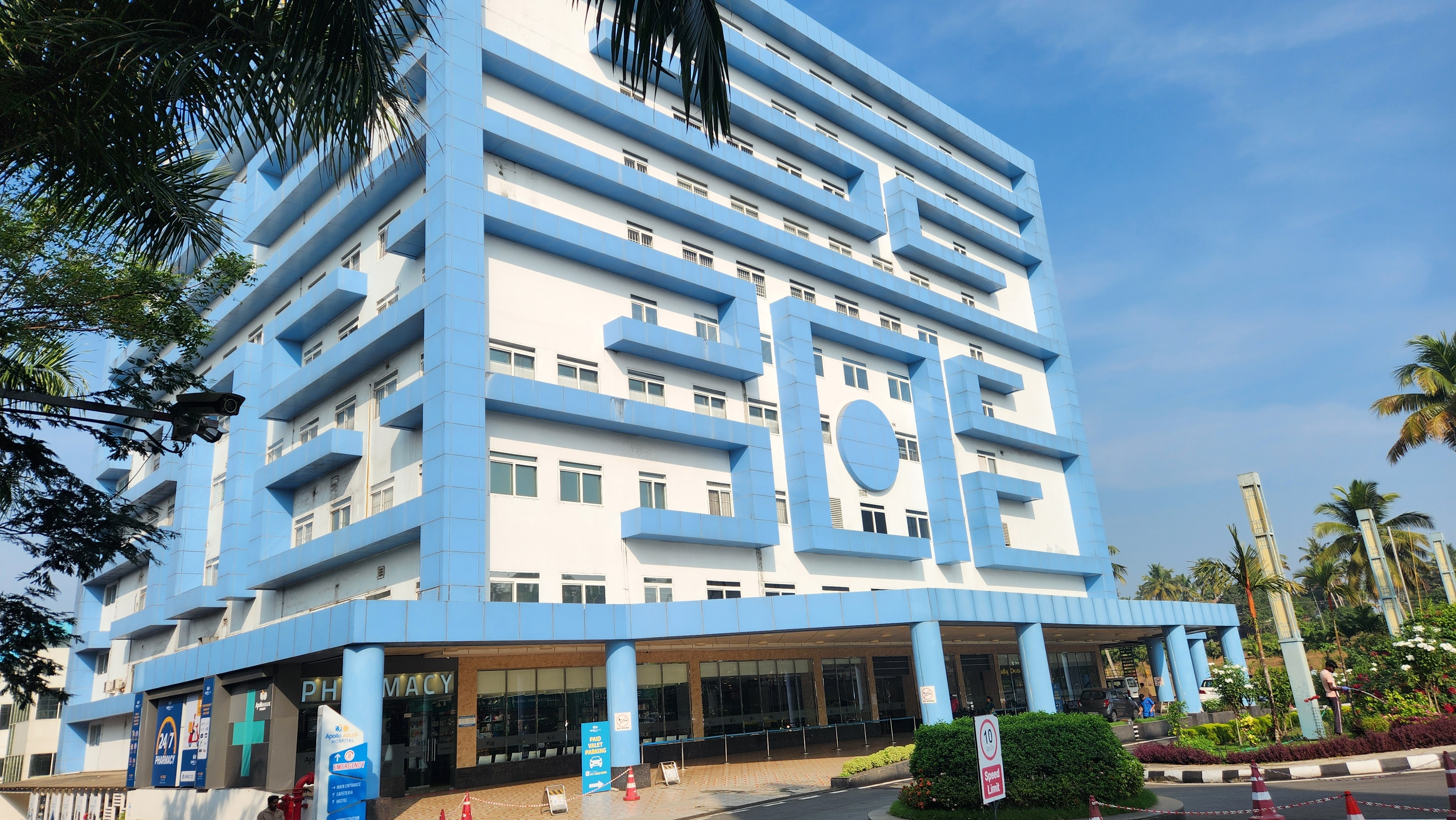

Geography
- Location: Karukutty, Angamaly, Kerala, India

Organisation
- Care system: Private
- Type: For-profit
- Network: Apollo Hospitals

Services
- Standards: NABH
- Emergency department: Yes
- Beds: 250

History
- Constructed: 2018

Links
- Website: www.apolloadluxhospital.co
- Lists: Hospitals in India

Apollo Adlux Hospital is a 250-bedded tertiary care hospital, located at Karukutty, Angamaly, Kerala. Started in 2018, it is a joint venture of Apollo Hospitals and Adlux Group, the first of Apollo Hospitals in the state.

== History ==
Apollo Adlux Hospital was established as a joint venture between Apollo Hospitals and the Adlux Group at Karukutty near Angamaly, marking Apollo Hospitals' entry into Kerala.

The hospital was developed near Cochin International Airport to improve tertiary healthcare access in central Kerala and to serve medical tourists arriving through the airport.

== Achievements ==
The hospital has been noted for adopting robotic-assisted surgery in Kerala, particularly in gastrointestinal and urological surgery.
