= Erayamkudy =

Erayamkudy എരയാംകുടി
- Village in Thrissur District, Kerala, India
- Location in Kerala, India Erayamkudy (India)
- Coordinates: 10°13′0″N 76°20′0″E
- Country: India
- State: Kerala
- District: Thrissur

Government
  - Body: Annamanada Panchayath

Languages
  - Official: Malayalam, English
- Time zone: UTC+5:30 (IST)
- PIN: 680308
- Telephone code: 0480-273
- Vehicle registration: KL-64 (Chalakudy)
- Nearest city: Angamaly, Chalakudy
- Lok Sabha constituency: Chalakudy
- Civic agency: Annamanada Grama Panchayath

Erayamkudy is a small village in the Thrissur District of the Kerala state of India. This village is on the shore of the Chalakudy River with an ancient temple, Erayamkudy Bhagavathi Temple. The nearest villages are Mambra, Annamanada, Puliyanam and Elavoor. The village has a population of about 1000. The majority of people who live here mainly depend on coconut, rice, and nutmeg crops. The village is known for the agitation of 2008 regarding the destruction of paddy fields. Various leaders like VS Achudanandan visited the protest. Erayamkudy is known for its nutmeg plantations. Erayamkudy has also been a location for filming some scenes of the 2019 movie Thanneer Mathan Dinangal and 2023 movie Maheshum Marutiyum.
