= Govt Higher Secondary School Puliyanam =

School in Ernakulam District, Kerala, India

Coordinates: 10°12′11.63″N 76°21′17.09″E

Govt Higher Secondary School, Puliyanam
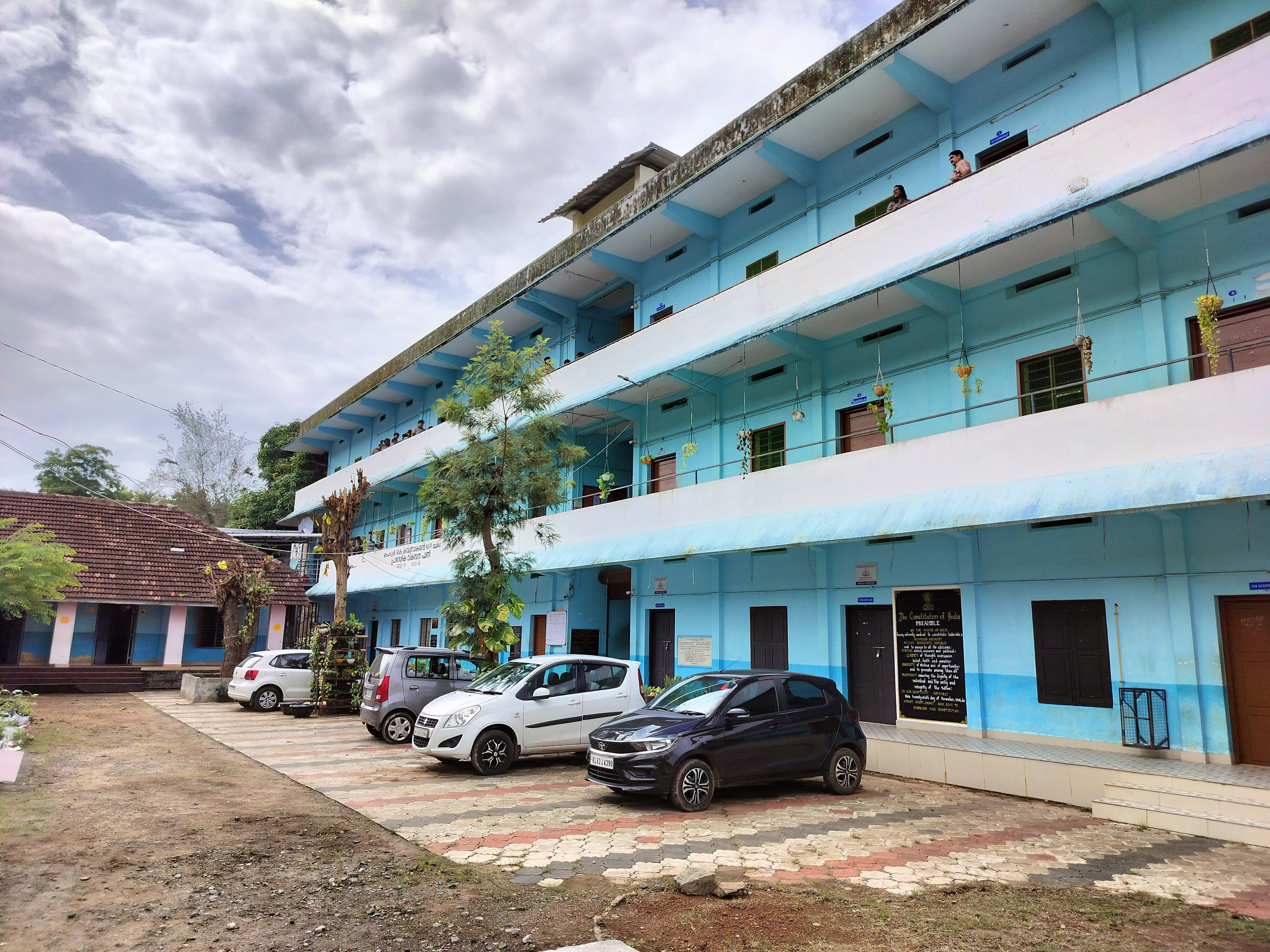
- Main campus of Govt Higher Secondary School Puliyanam

Location
- Puliyanam PO, 683572; Puliyanam; Puliyanam, Kerala; India

Information
- Type: Higher Secondary
- Established: 01/06/1947
- Founder: Sree. Devan Vasudevan Namboothirippad
- Status: Government School
- School district: Ernakulam District
- School code: 25028
- Principal: Riyamol M M
- Headmaster: Kochurani P O
- Gender: Boys and Girls
- Language: Malayalam
- Affiliation: Govt. of Kerala
- Website: https://schoolwiki.in/25028

Govt. Higher Secondary school, Puliyanam is a school situated in Parakkadavu Gram Panchayat, Ernakulam District, Kerala, India. The school is situated in Angamaly assembly constituency. The school was established on 1947.The school is situated in Puliyanam-Vattaparambu Road. Bose Krishnamachari is an alumnus of this school.

== History ==
In 1947, a lower primary school was started under Bhadrakali Mattappilli Mana located in Puliyanam village. This school was started in a building called Sri.Bhadrakali Mattapalli Mana Vaka Pattarumadam. Mr. Devan Vasudevan Namboothiripad was the Karanavar of Mana at that time. Later the Mana authorities handed over this school to Government of Kerala. It was upgraded to Upper Primary in 1963, High School in 1966 and Higher Secondary School in 1997.

== Amenities ==
All high school and higher secondary school as now upgraded to smart class rooms by KITES. A weather station and rain water storage tank is situated in the campus.

== Curriculum ==
The school follows Kerala State Syllabus of Education (SCERT) for classes from 1st to 12th.

== Buildings ==
The school has one double storied building and four single storied building. The higher secondary class rooms are working in the double storied building. High school class rooms and labs are functioning in single storied buildings. A large play ground is situated near by the buildings.

== Notable alumni ==
- Bose Krishnamachari
- Neurologist A N Radhakrishnan Nair

== Gallery ==
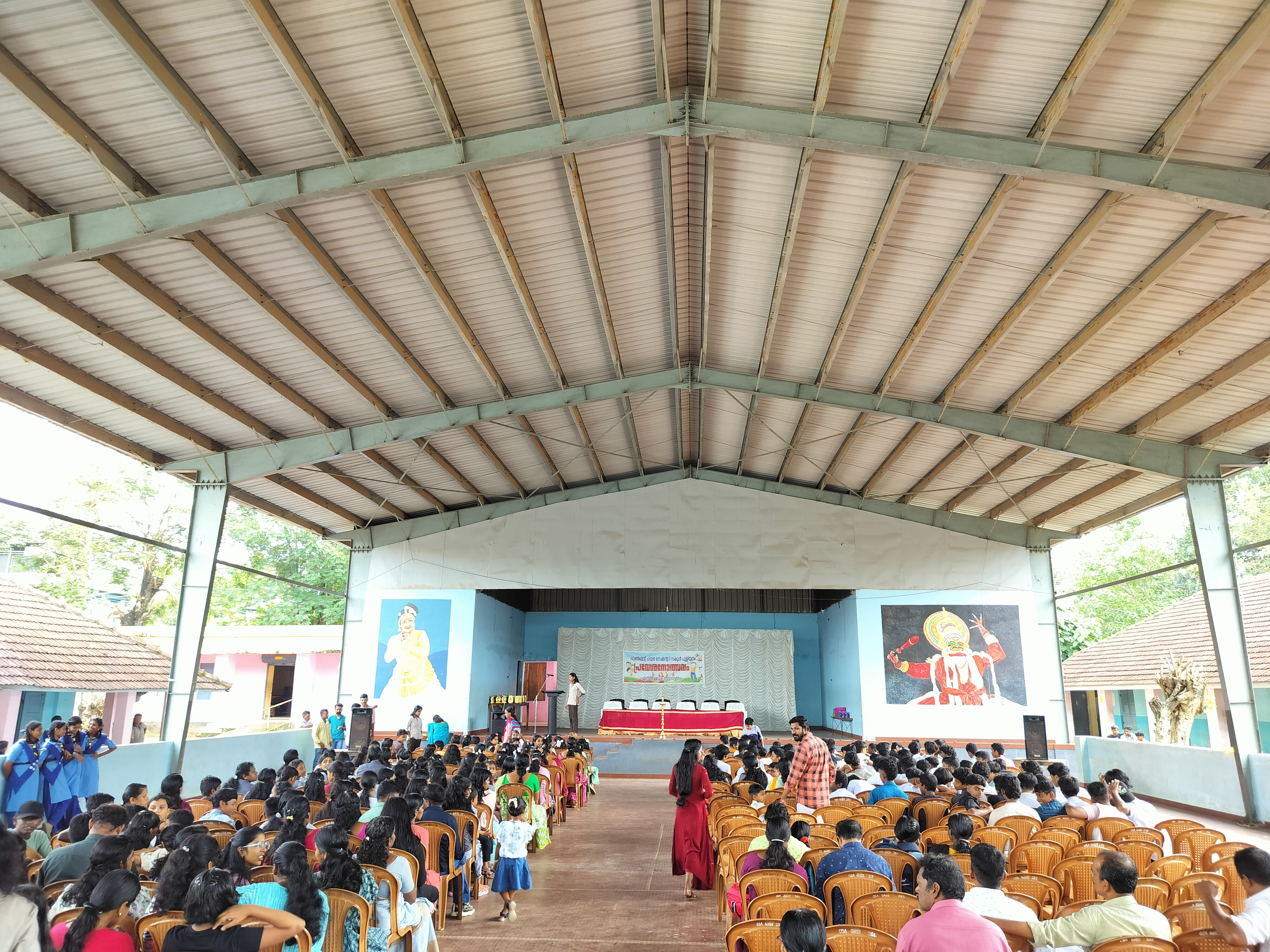
Auditorium

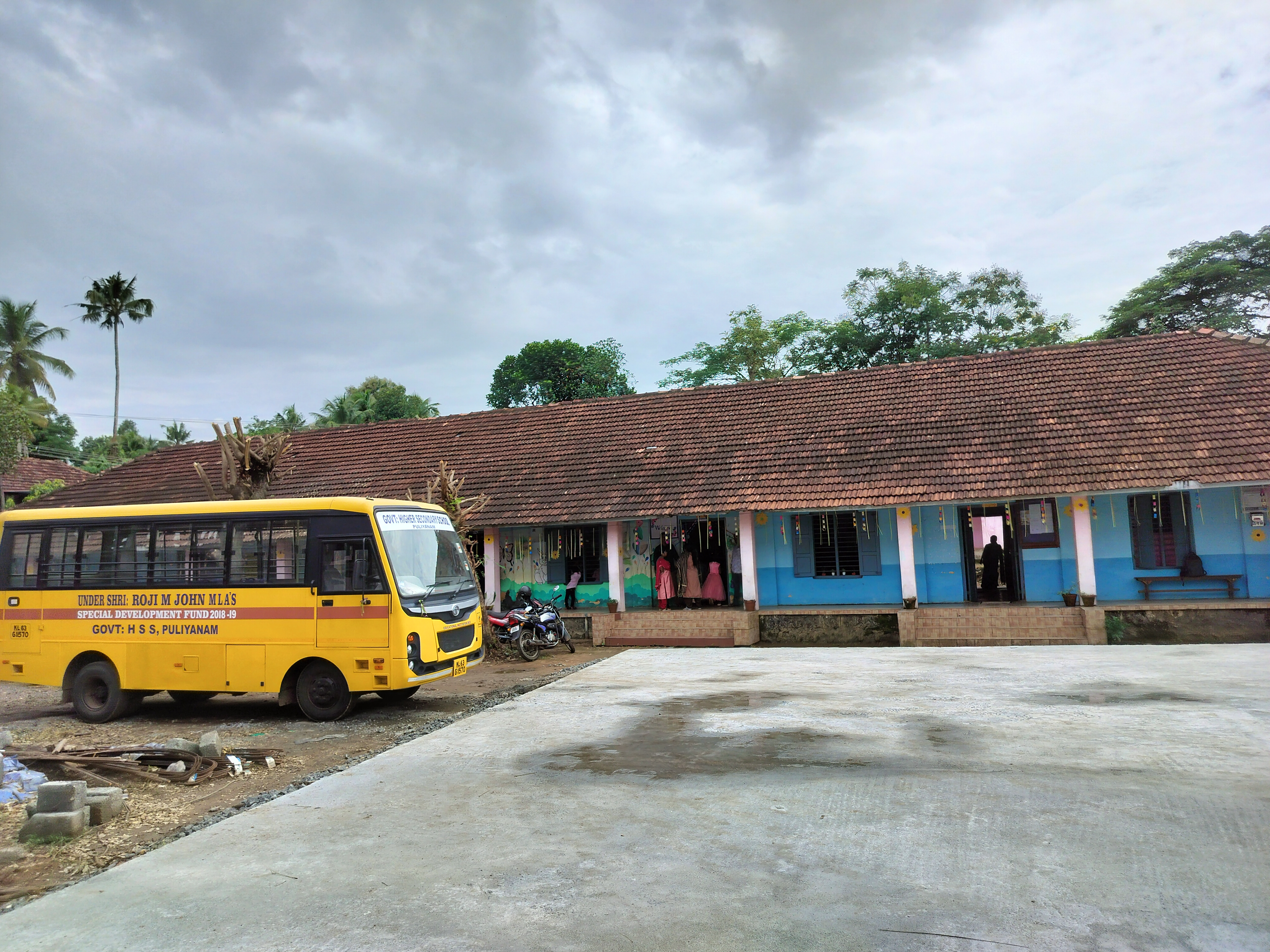
Campus

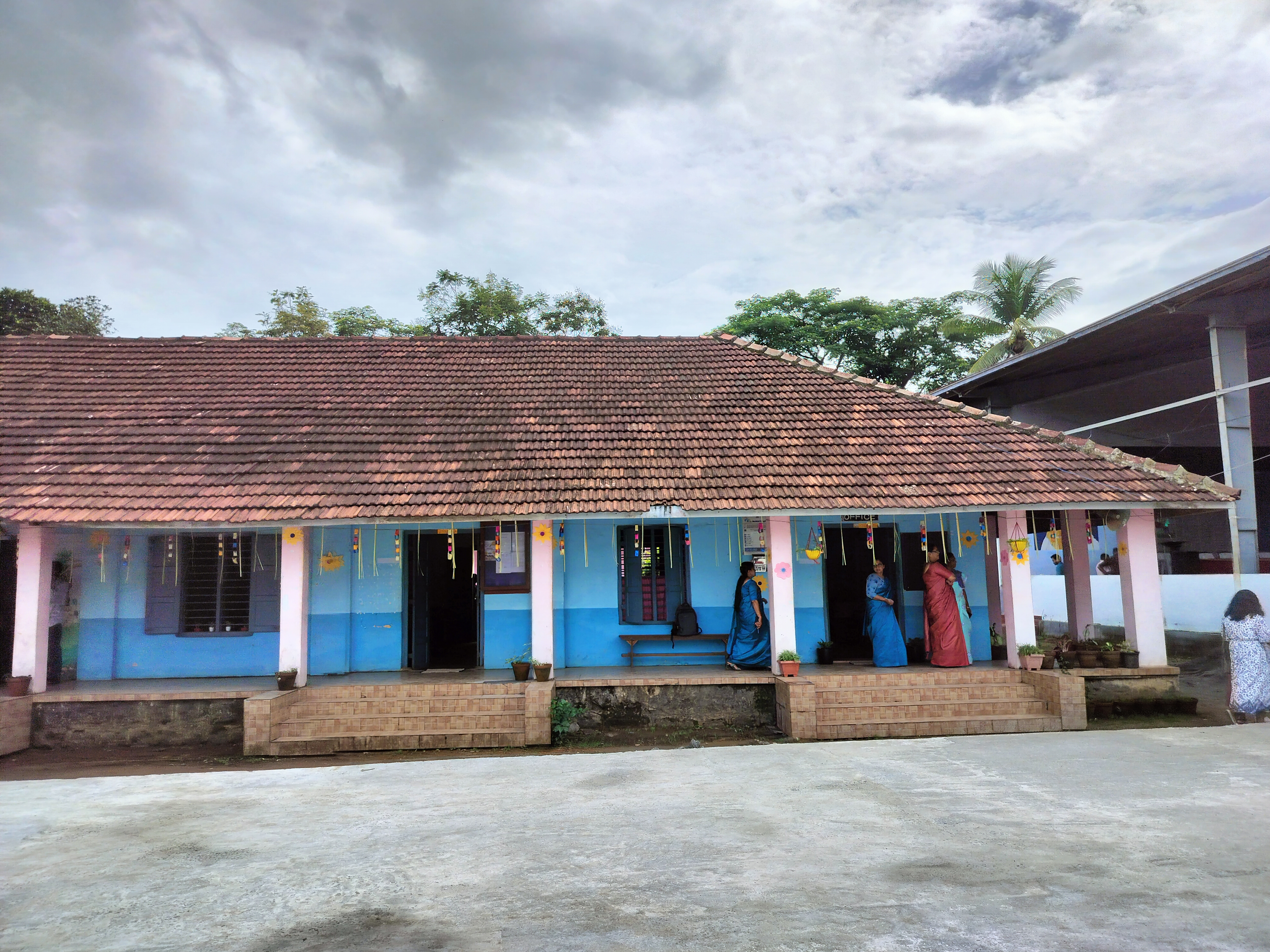
Class rooms

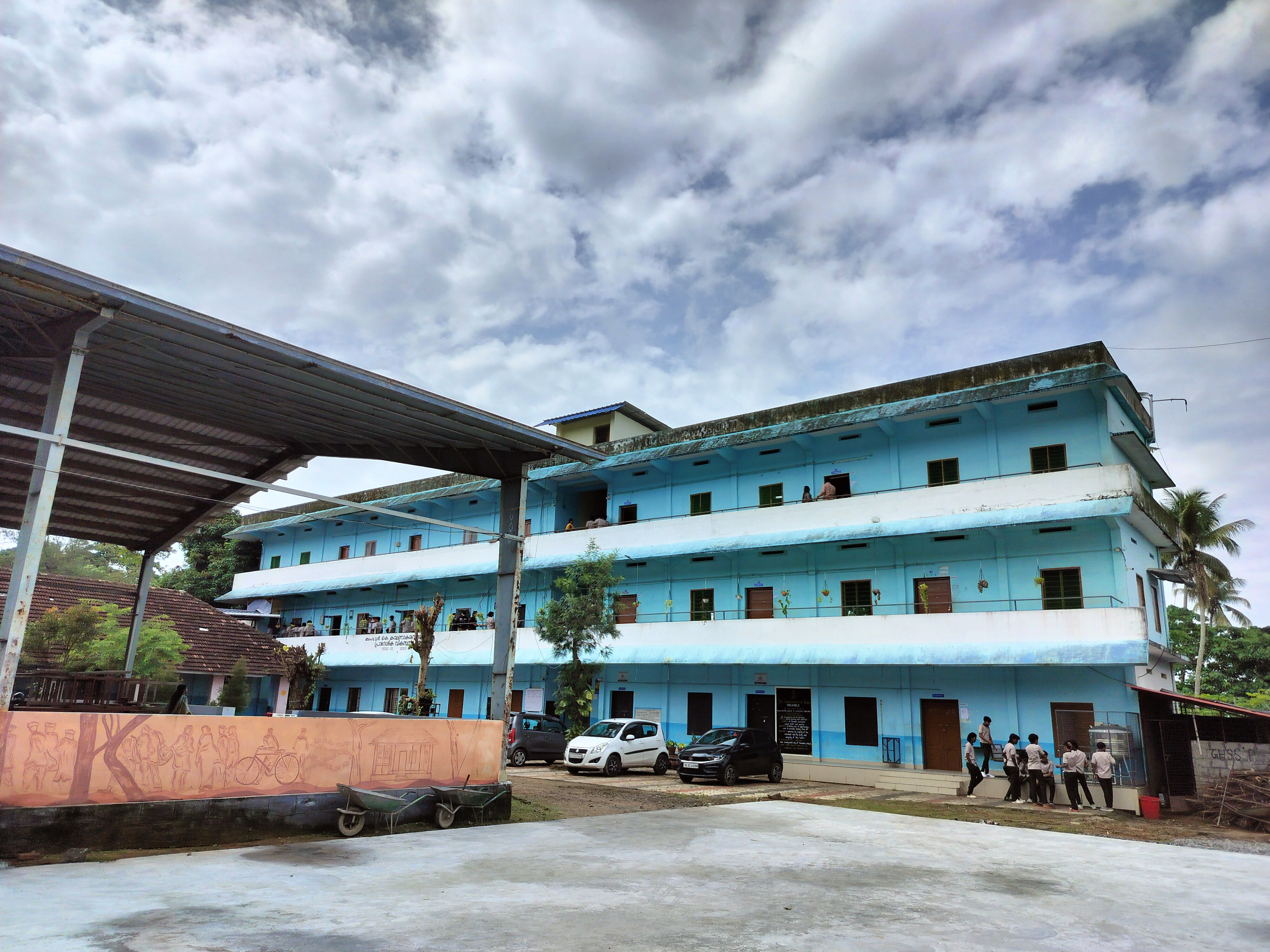
Higher Secondary Block

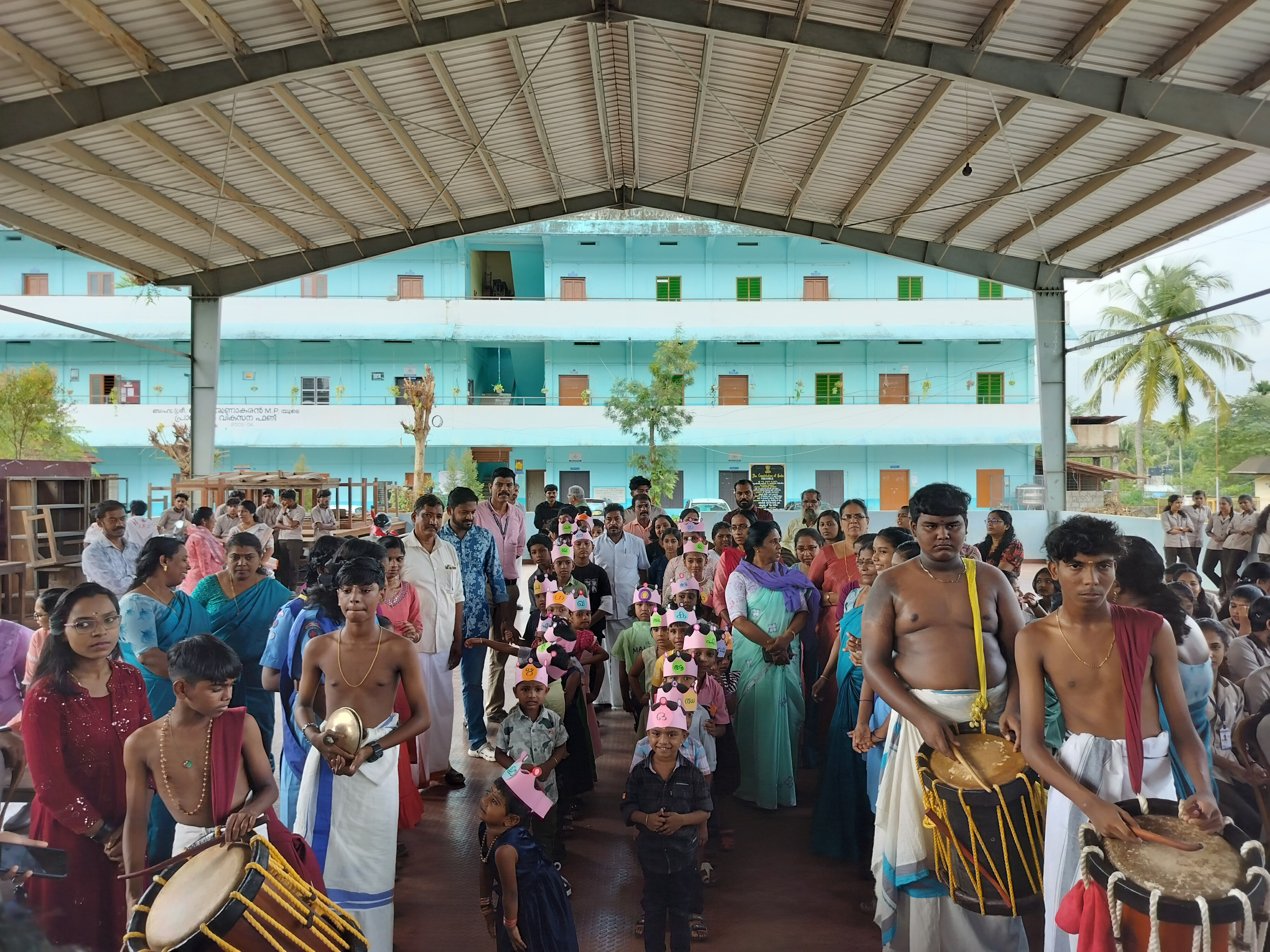
Welcoming New Students

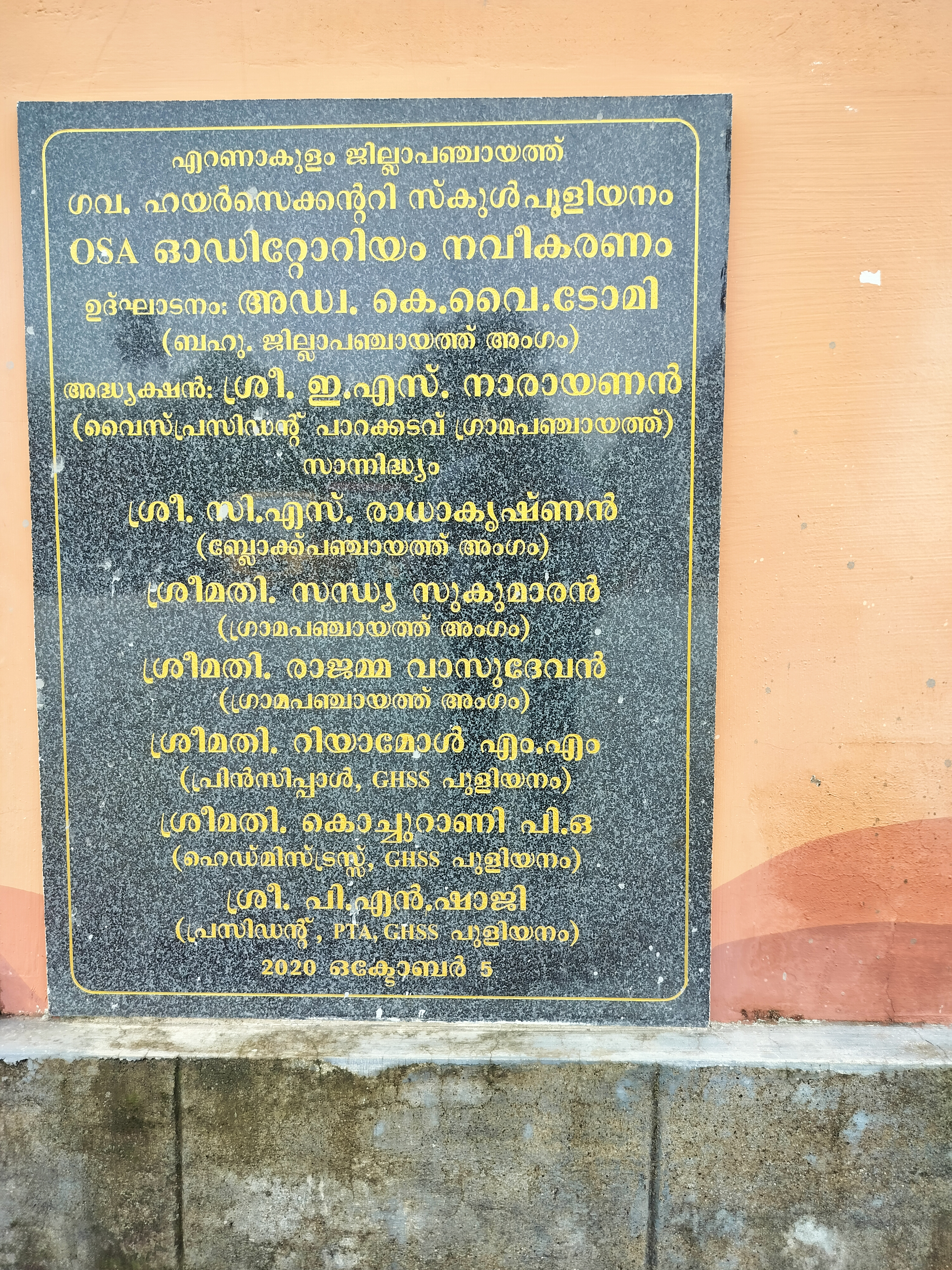
Plaq

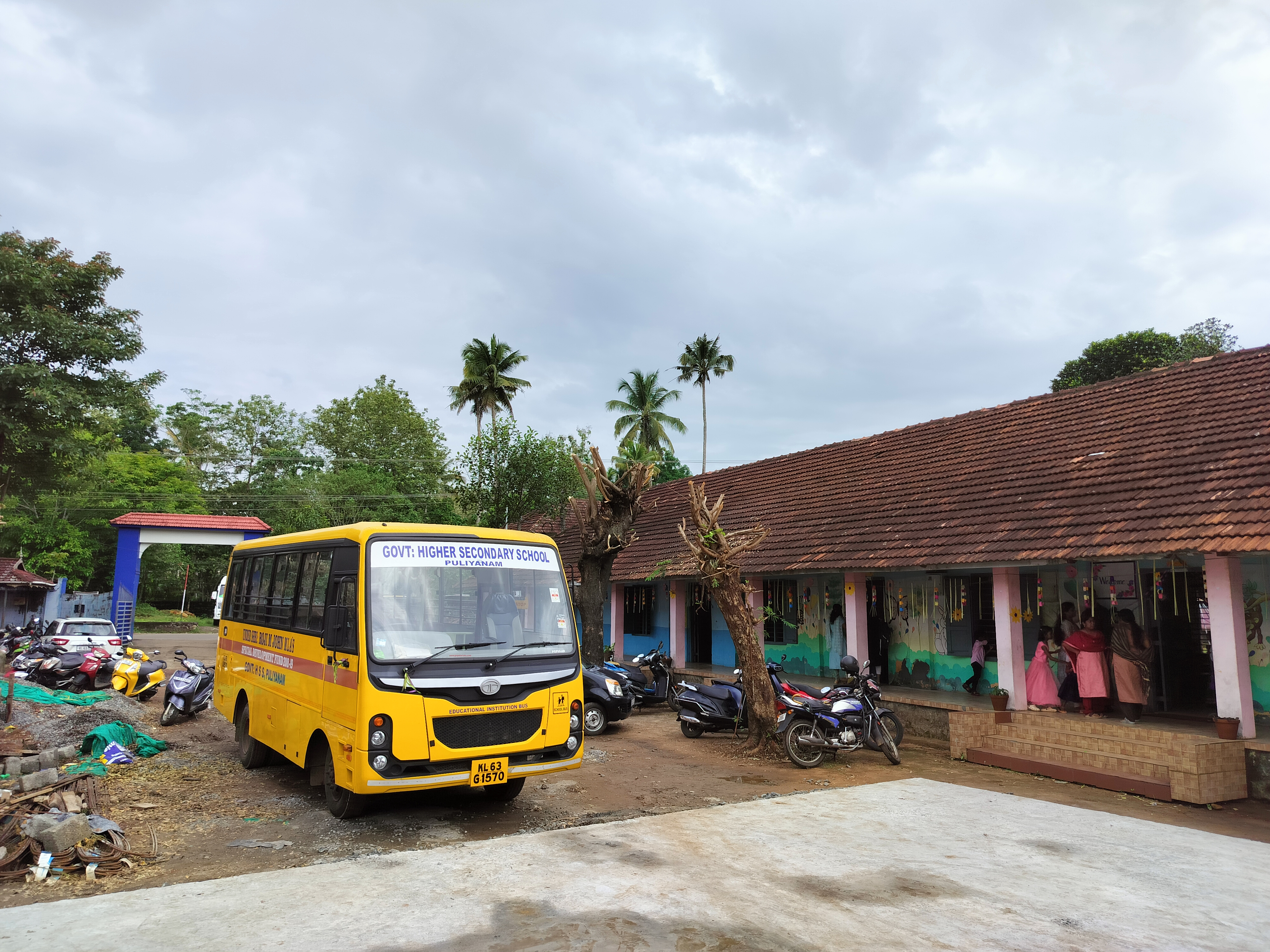
Campus

== See also ==
- List of schools in Ernakulam district
- SSLC
- Education in Kerala
- Puliyanam
