= Vallam–Parakkadavu Bridge =

Bridge in Kerala, India

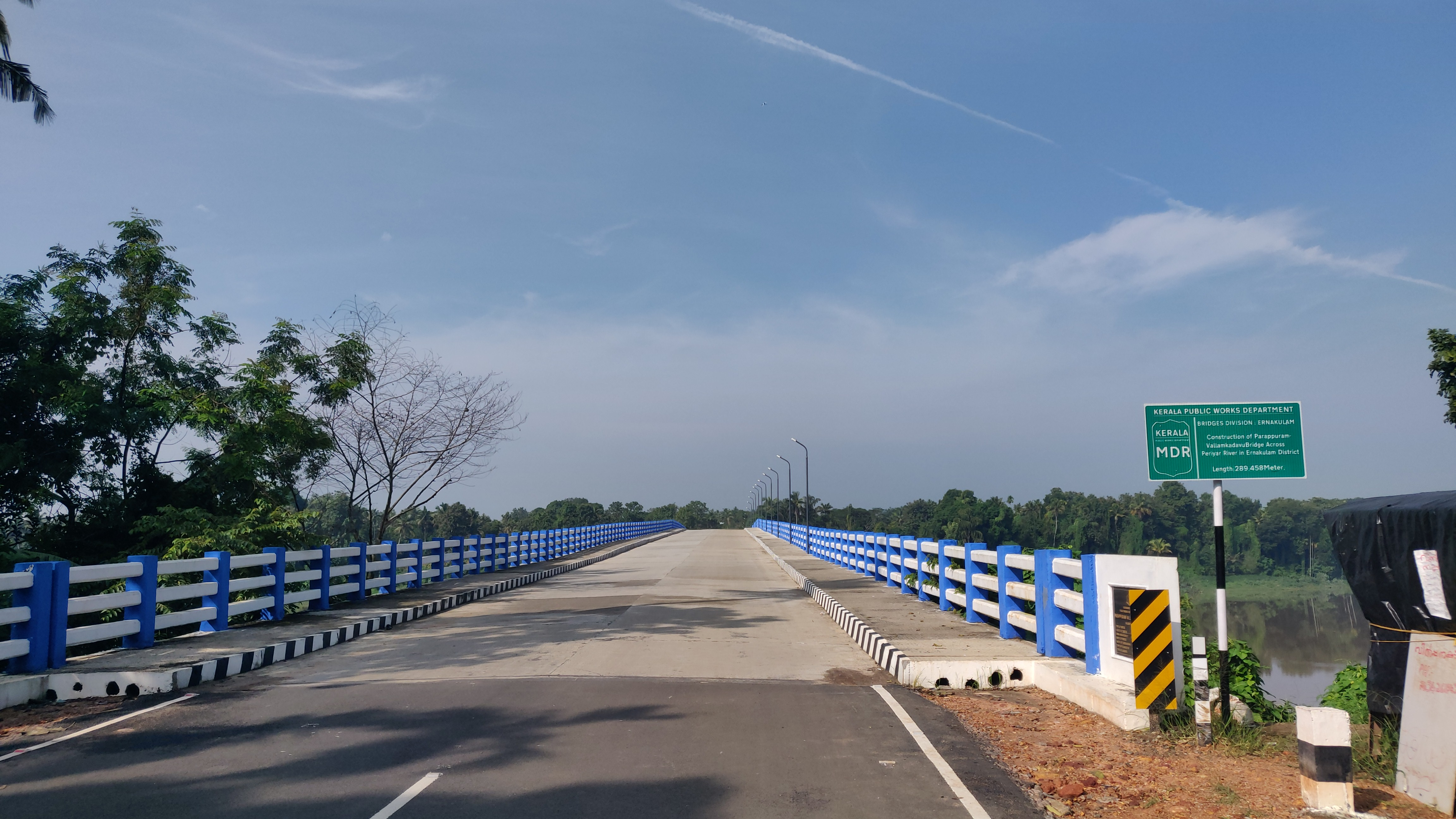
- Parappuram Vallamkadavu Bridge
- Coordinates: 10°07′59″N 76°27′26″E
- Locale: Parakkadavu

Characteristics
- Total length: 289 m
- Width: 11 m
- No. of spans: 9

History
- Construction start: 2016
- Construction end: 2023
- Opened: 24 August 2023

Location
- Interactive map of Vallam–Parakkadavu Bridge

The Vallom–Parakkadavu Bridge, also known as Parappuram-Vallamkadavu Bridge, is a bridge across the Periyar, that connects Vallamkadavu in Perumbavoor municipality with Parappuram in Kanjoor, in Kerala. Opened in August 2023, the bridge makes the travelling from the Idukki and Kottayam districts to the Cochin International Airport easier, as it reduce the travel distance to Nedumbassery by 10 km.

== Overview ==
The bridge's construction got under way in 2016 after receiving technical approval for ₹23 crore. Floods and the departure of the company that had initially accepted the contract, however, caused a delay. Its construction was completed and opened to public in August 2023. With the opening of the bridge, people travelling from Perumbavoor and Muvattupuzha to Nedumbassery Airport and Ernakulam via Aluva have easy access to the airport. It acts as a bypass around Kalady Sreesankara bridge, and Kaladi town, the busiest parts of MC Road. The bridge is 289.458 metres long and has been built in nine 32.162 metre spans. It is 11.23 metres wide, with 7.5 metres for vehicles and 1.5 metres for footpaths on both sides. The bridge's superstructure is made up of prestressed RC slabs supported by a 6.5 m diameter well foundation. Approach roads have been built for 200 metres on the Vallam side and 50 metres on the Parappuram side.
