= Palliyangadi =

Palliyangady, formerly known as Thalikakunnu, is located in Karukutty, Kerala, India, and it is capital of the Karukutty panchayat. Palliyangady is a small township with all amenities including schools, local administration, postal service, religious facilities, health care facilities, and a library.

== History ==
Located on the southern border of the erstwhile Cochin kingdom, Karukutty has been influenced by the cultures of both Travancore and Cochin kingdoms and has been cited in ancient Portuguese records. Remnants of an old fort, referred to locally as Kottathendu (കോട്ടത്തെണ്ട്), can be seen here. The fort – Nedumkotta (നേടുംക്കോട്ട) was built jointly by the Travancore and Cochin kingdoms to resist invasions by Tipu Sultan. Numerous other artifacts and vessels used by natives to store their treasures and valuables have also been excavated. There is a popular saying that goes "Karukutty kandaal maru kutty venda" (കറുകുററി കണ്ടാല് മറുകുററി വേണ്ട). It roughly translates to "If you have reached Karukutty, then you need not go looking elsewhere" – a sign of the self-sufficient and prosperous nature of the locality. The name itself literally translates to dark woodlands, suggesting the dense vegetation that covered this region till the 12th century.

Karukutty panchayat was formed on 28 December 1961 and was originally part of the Kunnathunadu taluk in Kottayam district. It later became part of Aluva taluk when the Ernakulam district was formed. P V Ouseppukutty Pynadath became the first president of the panchayat in 1961. After the elections in 1964, an eight-member administrative council took charge under the leadership of P C Sani. Other popular leaders who later became presidents were Thomas Aikkareth (1980), P L John and C T Devassy (1988).
