= Prathap C. Reddy =

Indian entrepreneur and cardiologist (born 1933)

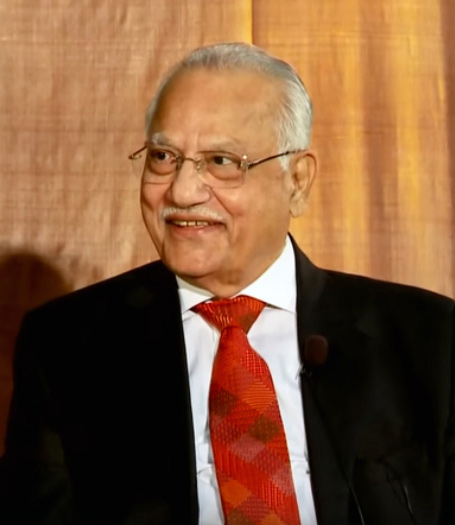
- Prathap C. Reddy in 2014
- Born: Prathap Chandra Reddy; 5 February 1933 (age 93); Aragonda, Madras Presidency, British India (present-day Chittoor, Andhra Pradesh, India)
- Education: Stanley Medical College
- Occupation: Businessman
- Spouse: Sucharitha Reddy
- Children: Preetha Reddy (daughter); Sangita Reddy (daughter); Suneeta Reddy (daughter); Shobana Kamineni (daughter)
- Relatives: Ram Charan (grandson-in-law); Armaan Ebrahim (grandson-in-law); Anindith Reddy (grandson)
- Awards: Padma Vibhushan (2010); Padma Bhushan (1991)

Prathap Chandra Reddy (born 5 February 1933) is an Indian entrepreneur and cardiologist who founded the first corporate chain of hospitals in India, the Apollo Hospitals.

As per Forbes list of India’s 100 richest tycoons, dated 9 October 2024, Prathap Reddy is ranked 94th with a net worth of $ 3.52 billion.

== Education ==
Reddy received his medical degree from Stanley Medical College in Chennai. He later trained as a cardiologist in the United Kingdom and the United States.

He completed his fellowship at Massachusetts General Hospital in Boston and went on to head several research programs at the Missouri State Chest Hospital in the United States, where he worked for several years before returning to India.

== Personal life ==
Reddy was married at an early age to Sucharita Reddy. The couple are the parents of four girls:

- Preetha Reddy,
- Sangita Reddy,
- Suneeta Reddy, wife of P. Dwarakanath Reddy, son of P. Ahobala Reddy of Nippo Batteries and Dyanora TV
- Shobana Kamineni. Her daughter, Upasana, is married to Ram Charan, an actor in Telugu cinema.

All of Reddy's daughters are serving as directors in the Apollo Hospitals.

== Awards and recognition ==
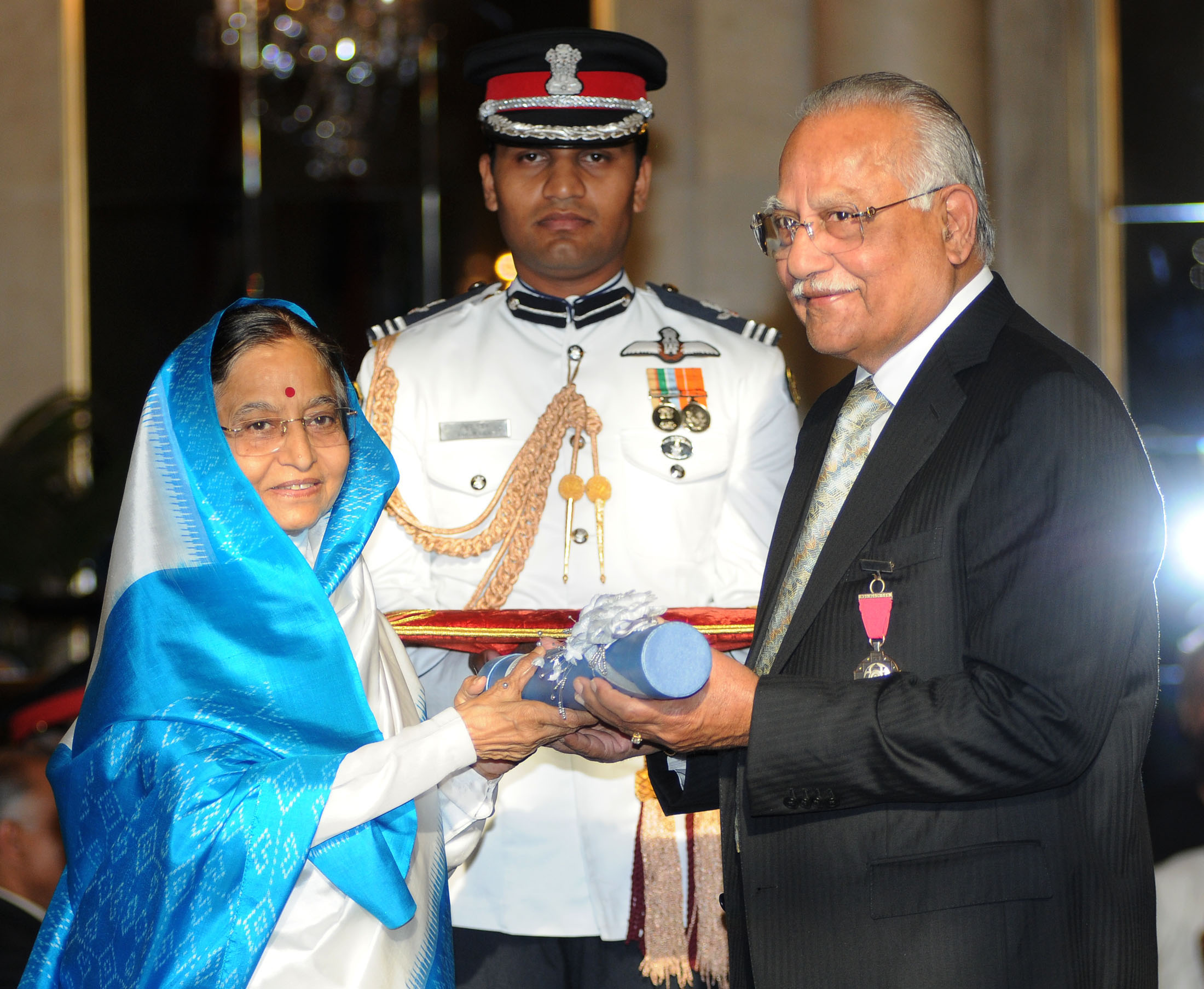
Prathap C. Reddy, receiving Padma Vibhushan award from the president Pratibha Patil, in 2010

- 1991: Conferred with the honor Padma Bhushan
- 2010: Conferred with the second highest civilian honor Padma Vibhushan
- 2018: Conferred the Lions Humanitarian Award by Apollo Hospitals
- 2022: Conferred the Lifetime Achievement Award by IMA
