= Shobana Kamineni =

Indian business executive

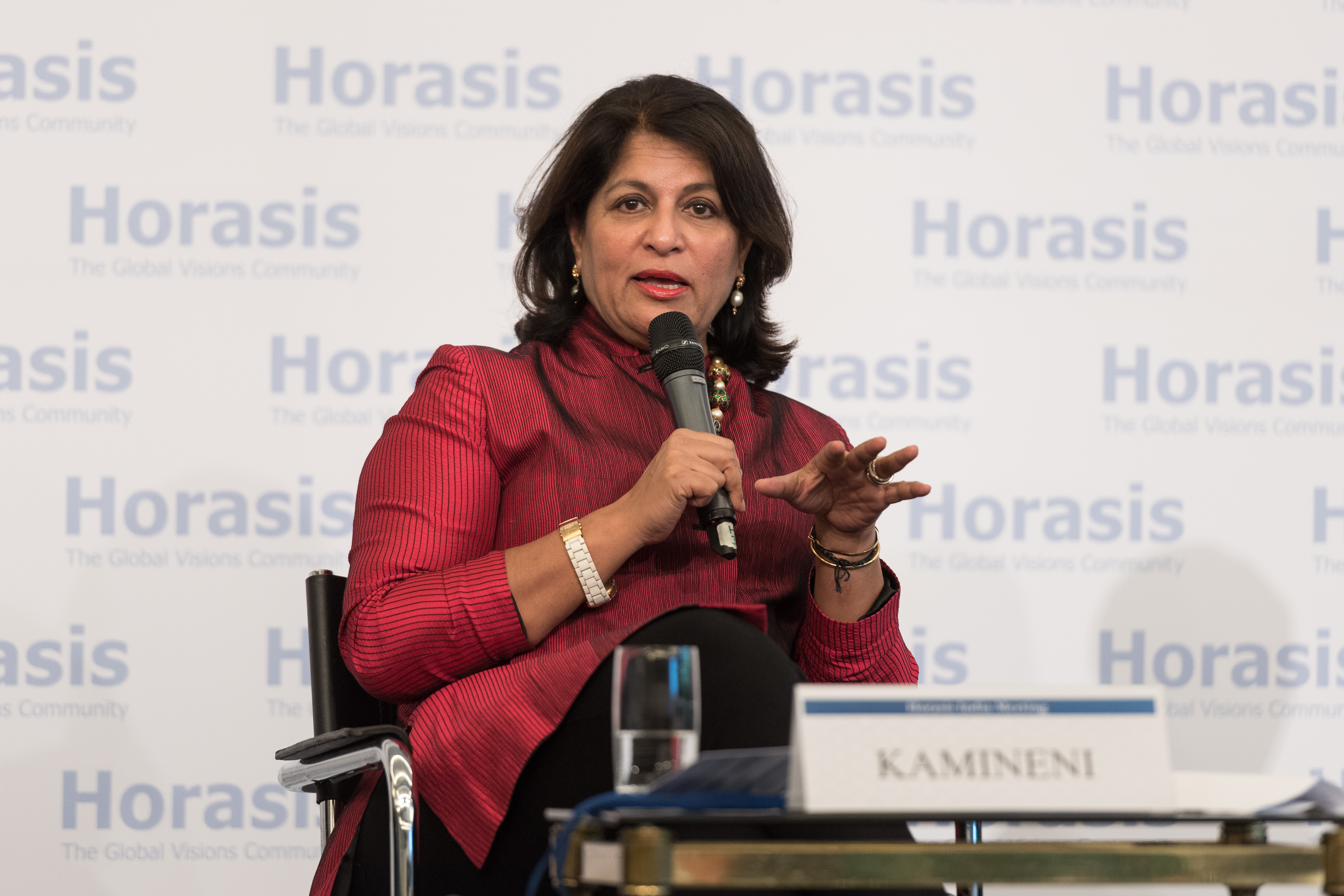
- Kamineni in 2017
- Spouse: Anil Kamineni
- Children: 3
- Father: Prathap C. Reddy
- Relatives: Preetha Reddy (sister); Sangita Reddy (sister); Ram Charan (son-in-law); Armaan Ebrahim (son-in-law)

Shobana Kamineni is an Indian business executive and the executive vice-chairperson of Apollo Hospitals.

== Early and personal life ==
Shobana Kamineni is the daughter of Prathap C. Reddy, the founder and chairman of Apollo Hospitals. She has three sisters, Preetha, Suneeta Reddy and Sangita, who all work as executives in Apollo Hospitals.

She is married to Kamineni Anil, a businessman and wildlife conservationist. They have two daughters, Upasana Konidela and Anushpala Ebrahim. Upasana is married to Telugu filmstar Ram Charan, son of filmstar Chiranjeevi. Anushpala married Armaan Ebrahim, a professional car racer, in December 2021.

== Career ==
Kamineni Shobana has held various positions in the Apollo Group since a young age. She served as the president of the Confederation of Indian Industry from 2017 to 2018. She was the first woman to hold this position. Kamineni has received an honorary doctorate from Bryant University, USA, in recognition of her work in healthcare and pharmaceuticals.
