= Apollo Hospital, Indraprastha =

Indraprastha Apollo Hospital
- Indraprastha Apollo Hospital
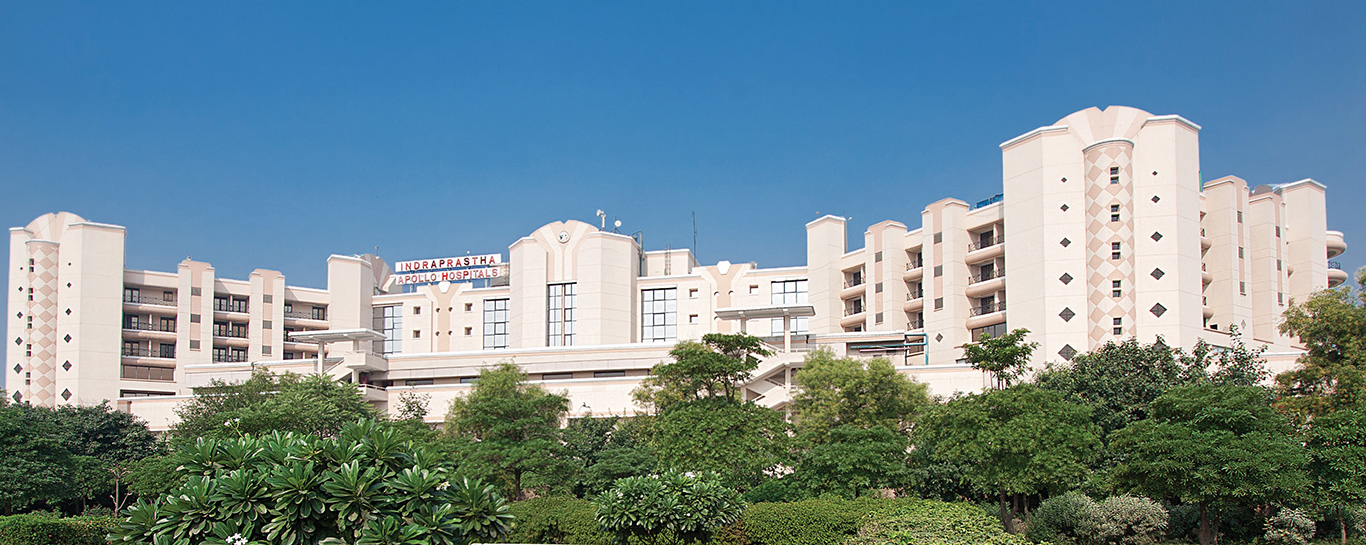
- Indraprastha Apollo Hospital

Geography
- Location: Delhi Mathura Road, Jasola Vihar, New Delhi, India
- Coordinates: 28°32′28″N 77°17′00″E

Organisation
- Type: General

History
- Opened: 1996; 30 years ago

Links
- Website: www.apollohospitals.com/delhi/
- Lists: Hospitals in India

Indraprastha Apollo Hospital is a hospital in Delhi, India, operated by Apollo Hospitals. Its parent company is the publicly-listed Indraprastha Medical Corporation Limited, which is jointly promoted by the Government of Delhi and the Apollo Hospitals group. Established in 1995, it is a 695-bed tertiary care hospital, spread over 15 acres and a built-up area of 600,000 square feet.

== History ==
Indraprastha Apollo Hospital was accredited by Joint Commission International (JCI) USA as the first internationally accredited Hospital in India in 2005 and South Asia. In 2011, the hospital got re-accredited by JCI for a fourth time consequently, making it the first hospital in India to do so.

== Healthcare ==
In February 2026, Indraprastha Apollo Hospital has launched an advanced technology Varian Edge® Radiosurgery system to treat cancer.
