= Chirakkal Mahadeva temple =

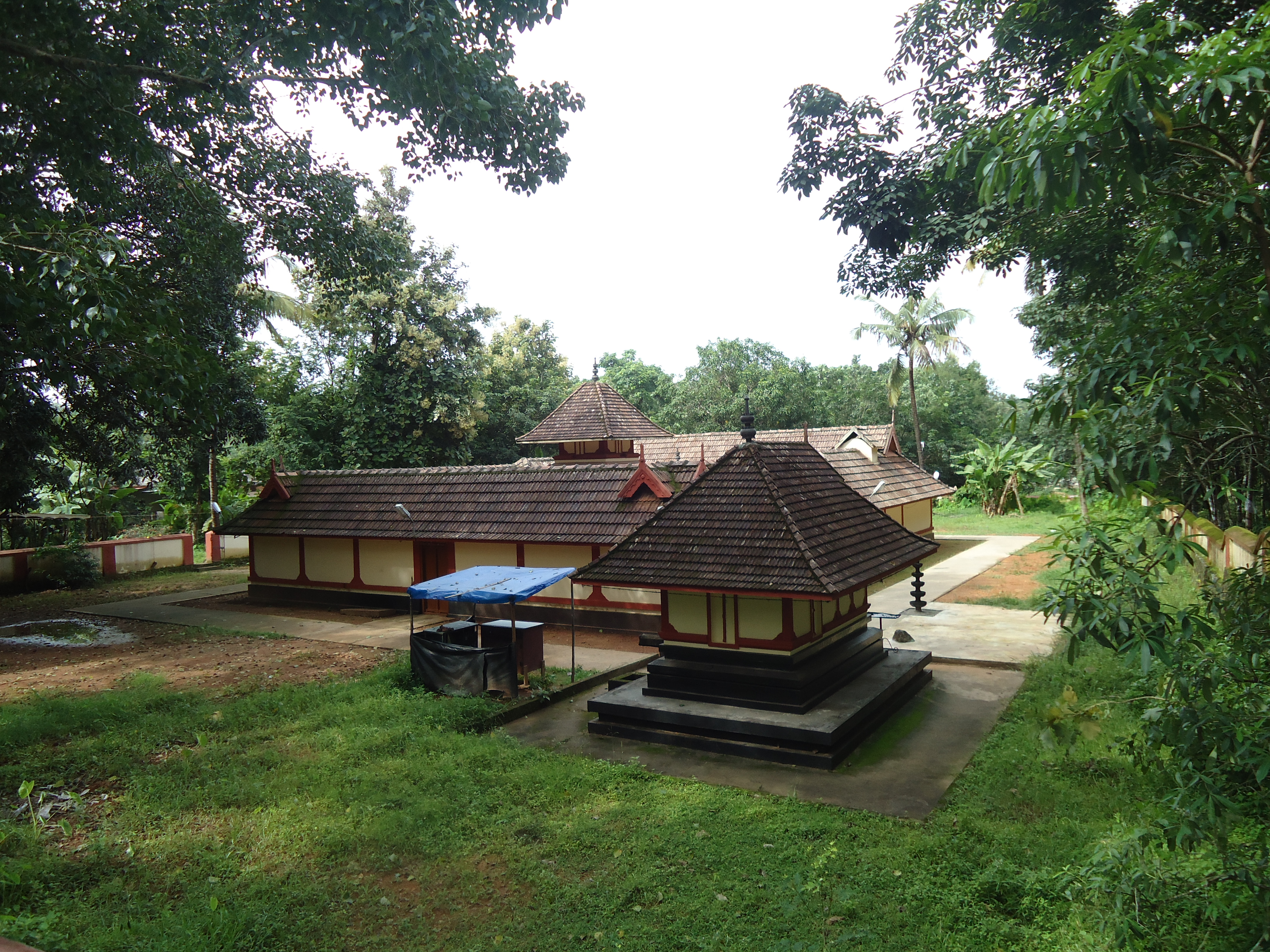
- Chirakkal Mahadeva temple, Angamaly

- Chirakkal Mahadeva temple, Ernakulam, Kerala

Religion
- Affiliation: Hinduism
- District: Ernakulam
- Deity: Mahadeva
- Festival: Maha Shivaratri

Location
- Location: Puliyanam, Angamaly, Ernakulam Kerala, India
- State: Kerala
- Country: India
- Interactive map of Chirakkal Mahadeva temple
- Coordinates: 10.203558°N 76.355321°E

Architecture
- Type: Architecture of Kerala

Specifications
- Temple: One
- Elevation: 40.47 m (133 ft)

Chirakkal Mahadeva temple in Kerala, India is the 108th Shiva temple in India. The main deity in this temple is Lord Shiva and He is in Rowdra bhavam in this temple.

== Location ==
This temple is located with the coordinates of 10.203558°N 76.355321°E in Puliyanam village of Angamaly neighbourhood of Ernakulam district in the state of Kerala in India.
