= P Obul Reddy =

Indian businessman (1925–2010)

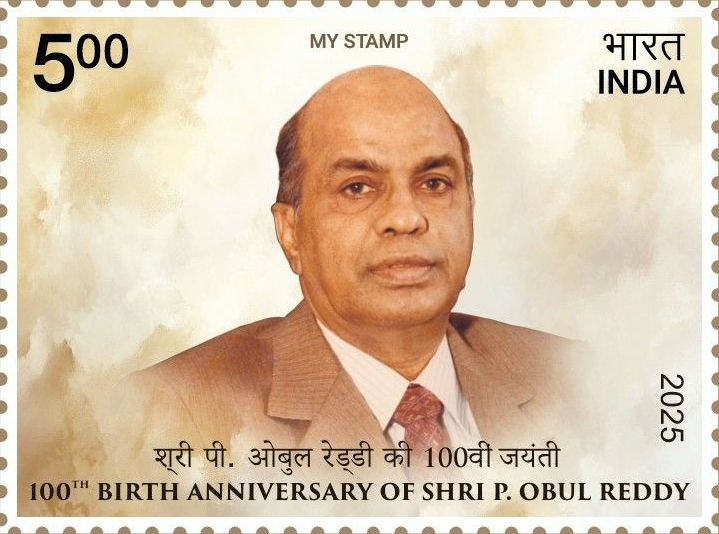
P Obul Reddy on a 2025 stamp of India

P Ahobala Reddy (also spelt P Obul Reddy; 1925 – 30 June 2010) was an Indian entrepreneur, industrialist, philanthropist and patron of the arts.

Reddy was among the first industrialists from the south of India to take an interest in the television business and he was the proprietor of the firm that sold Dyanora TV sets. He was the former managing director and founder of Nippo Batteries. Among his other involvements in business, he was at one time the managing director of Panasonic India.

He was 85 when he died in 2010 and was survived by two sons and three daughters. His son P. Dwarakanath Reddy is married to Suneeta Reddy, the daughter of Apollo Hospitals founder Prathap C. Reddy.
