= Sri Lanka Insurance =

Sri Lanka Insurance Corporation
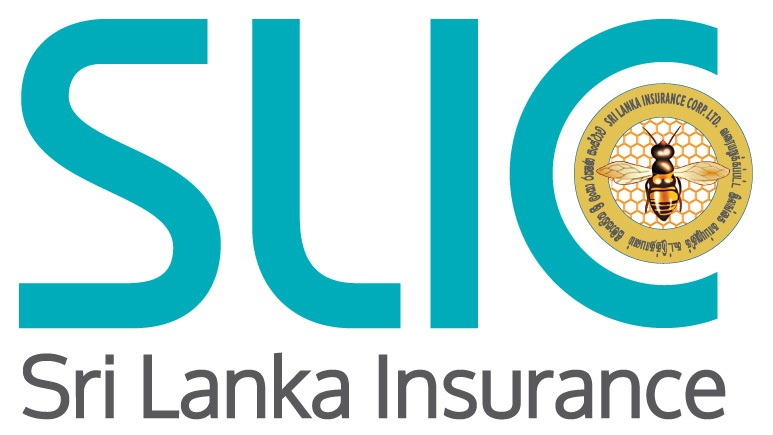
- Type: Government-owned corporation
- Industry: Financial services
- Founded: 1962; 64 years ago
- Headquarters: Colombo, Sri Lanka
- Key people: Nusith Kumaratunga (Chairman)
- Products: Insurance, asset management
- Revenue: ▲US$ 242.5 million (2018)
- Operating income: ▲US$ 39.07 million (2018)
- Net income: ▲US$ 28.55 million (2018)
- Total assets: ▲US$ 1.102 billion (2018)
- Owner: Government of Sri Lanka
- Number of employees: ▲2,703 (2018)
- Subsidiaries: Seylan Bank; Lanka Hospitals
- Website: www.srilankainsurance.com

Sri Lanka Insurance Corporation Limited, also known as Sri Lanka Insurance, is the largest and strongest composite insurance provider in Sri Lanka. It is the first and only insurance company in Sri Lanka to be assigned a prime AAA− rating for Insurance Financial Strength from the US rating agency Fitch Ratings New York City. The company now manages assets worth over US$1102 Million.

== History ==
Sri Lanka Insurance was incorporated by a special act of Parliament in 1961. It was formed by nationalizing the insurance industry which was run by various local and foreign private companies. It maintained the monopoly in the insurance industry until the establishment of the National Insurance Corporation in 1980. In 1988, the insurance field was liberalized by permitting private companies to enter the industry. In 1993 with the objective of providing greater autonomy to operate in this environment, the corporation was converted to a fully government-owned limited liability corporate entity. It was subsequently sold to the "Distilleries-Spence Consortium" under the Government Privatization Plan in April 2003. As such, it became a subsidiary of Distilleries Company of Sri Lanka PLC.

In November 2006, Sri Lanka Insurance acquired Lanka Hospitals Corporation PLC, which owns and operates Apollo Hospitals Colombo, a 350-bed state of art health care facility.

The Sri Lankan Parliament's Committee on Public Enterprises (COPE) revealed that the privatization process of Sri Lanka Insurance Corporation was irregular. In 2007, a case was filed in the Supreme Court challenging the privatization of Sri Lanka Insurance Corporation citing the revelations of this report. On 4 June 2009, the Supreme Court of Sri Lanka annulled the sale of Sri Lanka Insurance Corporation in 2003. As such Distilleries Company of Sri Lanka PLC was ordered to return its stake in Sri Lanka Insurance to the government treasury. The treasury was ordered to pay the purchase consideration back to Distilleries Consortium.
