= Apollo Hospitals, Visakhapatnam =

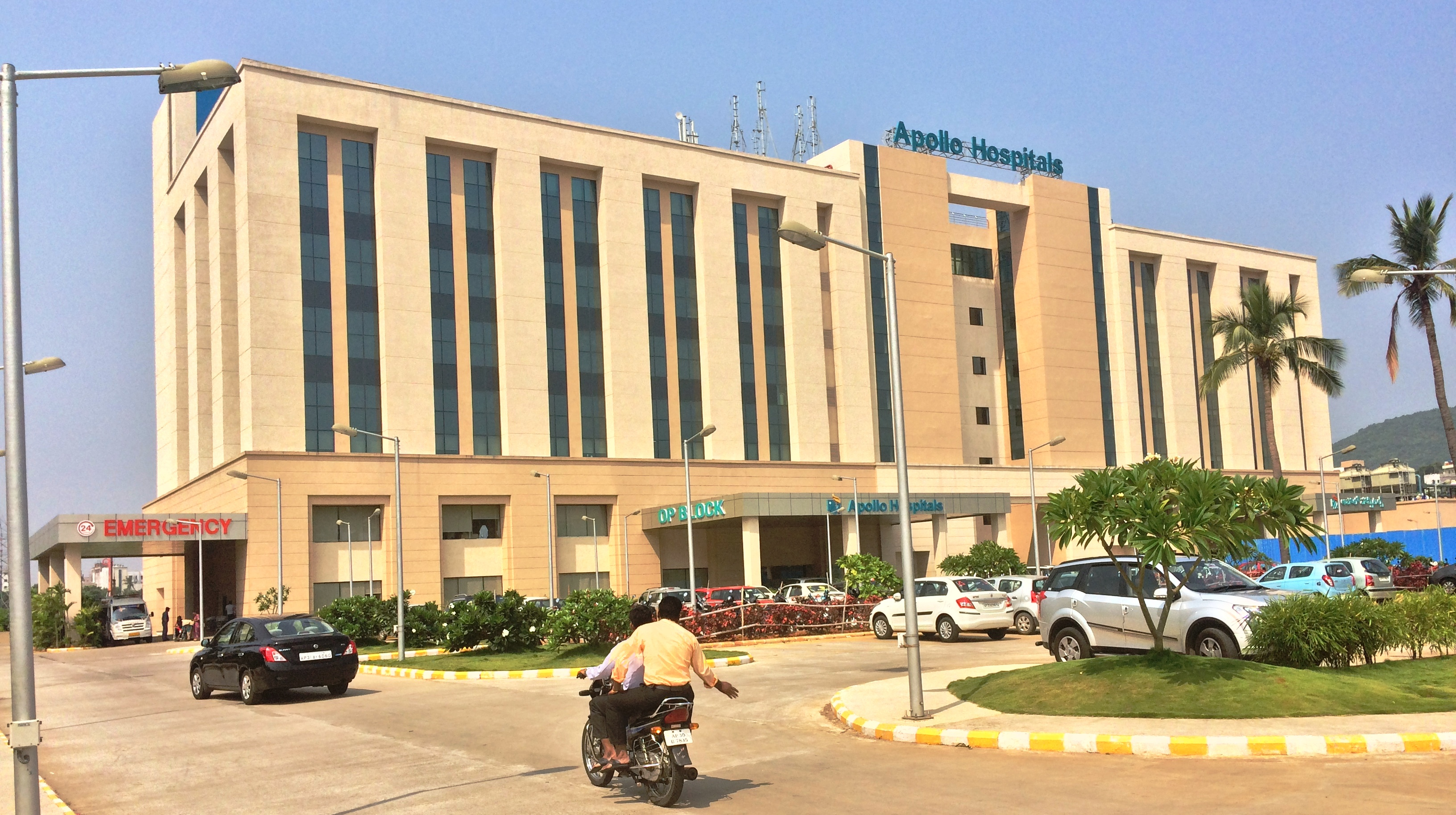

Geography
- Location: Arilova, Visakhapatnam, Andhra Pradesh, India
- Coordinates: 17.71708°N 83.30921°E

Organisation
- Type: Super speciality
- Affiliated university: Andhra Medical College

Services
- Emergency department: Yes

History
- Founded: 2016

Links
- Website: apollovizag

Apollo Hospitals, Visakhapatnam is a branch of the Apollo Group of Hospitals located in Visakhapatnam, Andhra Pradesh, India. The hospital serves the health needs of north coastal Andhra Pradesh and adjacent Odisha.

== History ==
The multi-specialty, 350-bed hospital at Health City, Arilova, Visakhapatnam, has been operational since 2016. The hospital includes a Trauma Care Team and a Respiratory Rehabilitation Unit. The institute covers various branches of healthcare, including neurosciences, orthopedics, cosmetic and plastic surgery, gastroenterology, and liver clinics. Departments include cardiology, cardiovascular surgery, neurosurgery (including thrombectomy), bariatric surgery, plastic surgery, critical care, obstetrics and gynecology, nephrology, urology, orthopedics, radiology, ENT, and organ transplant.

== Services ==
=== Out patient clinic ===
Out patient clinics are available from 8:00 am to 8:00 pm from Monday to Saturday.

=== Apollo pharmacy ===
One Apollo pharmacy outlet is attached to the main hospital. It is a part of Apollo Hospitals.

=== Education and research ===
AHERF hosts academic courses coupled with research in the field of healthcare.
