= Nippo Batteries =

Indian battery manufacturer

Indo National Limited
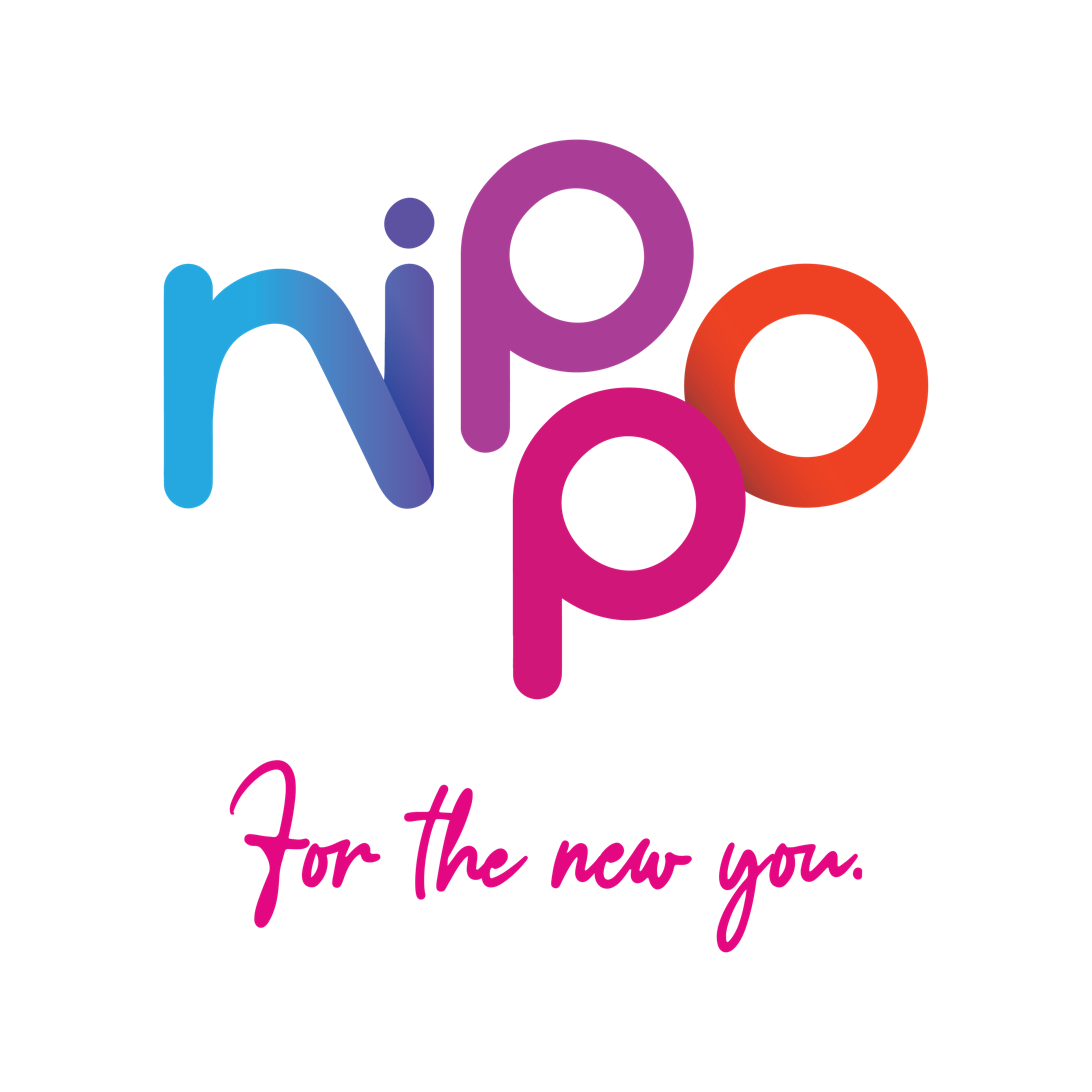
- Type: Public
- Traded as: NSE: NIPPOBATRY; BSE: 504058
- Industry: Electronics
- Founded: 1972
- Founder: P Obul Reddy
- Headquarters: Chennai, Tamil Nadu, India
- Products: Batteries; Torches
- Revenue: ₹2832.5m
- Operating income: ₹35.9m
- Net income: ₹60.2m
- Number of employees: 540
- Website: www.nippo.in

Indo National Limited is a company that manufactures batteries in India. The corporate office is in Chennai, Tamil Nadu.The company spans 33 offices through the country. Nippo batteries reach millions of homes through 35 distributors, over 2800 stockists, 900 vans and 500 autos covering over 5 lakh (500,000) retail outlets. Nippo is the second largest dry cell battery manufacturer in India, with 28% of the market in 2006. The company started exporting batteries in 1976, with the first consignment exported to Yemen.

== Production ==
Nippo has two main production facilities for its batteries, Nellore and Tada both in Andhra Pradesh.

== Achievements ==
Nippo has received many awards. One product, Nippo Gold, was rated the 'Best Performing AA cell' in the country. The recent award they got is "Best Management Award 2010"

== Products ==
An AA4-Battery (Rechargeable) Pack with recharger

Nippo manufactures many batteries of various types. Their products include:

- UM-1S - Nippo Hyper, Nippo Super, Nippo Special, Nippo Super Smart, Nippo Hyper.
- AA- Nippo Gold, Nippo Hyper, Nippo Super.

Apart from batteries Nippo also manufactures appliances mainly torches. Some other products manufactured by Nippo are Power Station, Compact Fluorescent Lamp and Emergency Power.
