= Aragonda =

- Village
- Interactive map of Aragonda
- Location in Andhra Pradesh, India Aragonda (India)
- Coordinates: 13.2813°N 78.9564°E
- Country: India
- State: Andhra Pradesh
- District: Chittoor

Population (2011)
  - Total: 5,392

Languages
  - Official: Telugu
- Time zone: UTC+5:30 (IST)
- PIN: 517129
- Telephone code: 8573
- Vehicle registration: AP 03

Aragonda is a village in Thavanampalle Mandal in Chittoor District of Andhra Pradesh State, India.

== Etymology ==
A myth which states – Lord Hanuman was transporting Sanjeevani (herbs for life) mountain, half of the mountain fell at this village. In the local language Ardha means half and Giri means mountain. Hence, the name Ardhagiri.
