= Parakkadavu =

- village
- Location in Kerala, India Parakkadavu (India)
- Coordinates: 10.212570°N 76.352010°E
- Country: India
- State: Kerala
- District: Ernakulam

Population (2011)
  - Total: 30,766

Languages
  - Official: Malayalam, English
- Time zone: UTC+5:30 (IST)

Parakkadavu (English: The ferry of rock) is a village situated along the banks of the Chalakkudi river in Ernakulam district in the Indian state of Kerala. Local paddy fields are fed by the Chalakkudi river. Parakkadavu is a Grama panchayath and a Block panchayath. Moozhikkulam Lakshmana Temple is just a walkable distance from Parakkadavu junction.

== Demographics ==
As of the 2011 India census, Parakkadavu had a population of 30766 with 15042 males and 15724 females.

== See also ==
- Vattapparambu
- Puliyanam
- Moozhikkulam
