= Karukutty =

- Village
- Location in Kerala, India Karukutty (India)
- Coordinates: 10°13′0″N 76°23′0″E
- Country: India
- State: Kerala
- District: Ernakulam
- Talukas: Aluva

Government
  - Body: Karukutty Panchayat

Area
  - Total: 33.57 km^{2} (12.96 sq mi)

Population (2001)
  - Total: 24,860
  - Density: 740.5/km^{2} (1,918/sq mi)

Languages
  - Official: Malayalam, English
- Time zone: UTC+5:30 (IST)
- PIN: 683 576
- Telephone code: 91 484
- Vehicle registration: KL-7, KL-41 and KL-63
- Nearest city: Angamaly, Chalakudy, Aluva
- Sex ratio: 0.971 ♂/♀
- Literacy: 90.28%
- Lok Sabha constituency: Chalakudy
- Civic agency: Karukutty Panchayat
- Distance from Kochi: 36 kilometres (22 mi) N (land)
- Distance from Thrissur: 40 kilometres (25 mi) S (land)

Karukutty is a village panchayat in Aluva Taluk, Ernakulam district of Kerala, India. Classified as a Grade A panchayat, Karukutty comprises 17 wards and falls under Angamaly block panchayat in Aluva taluk. It is part of the Angamaly Assembly constituency and the Chalakudy Parliament constituency.

== History ==
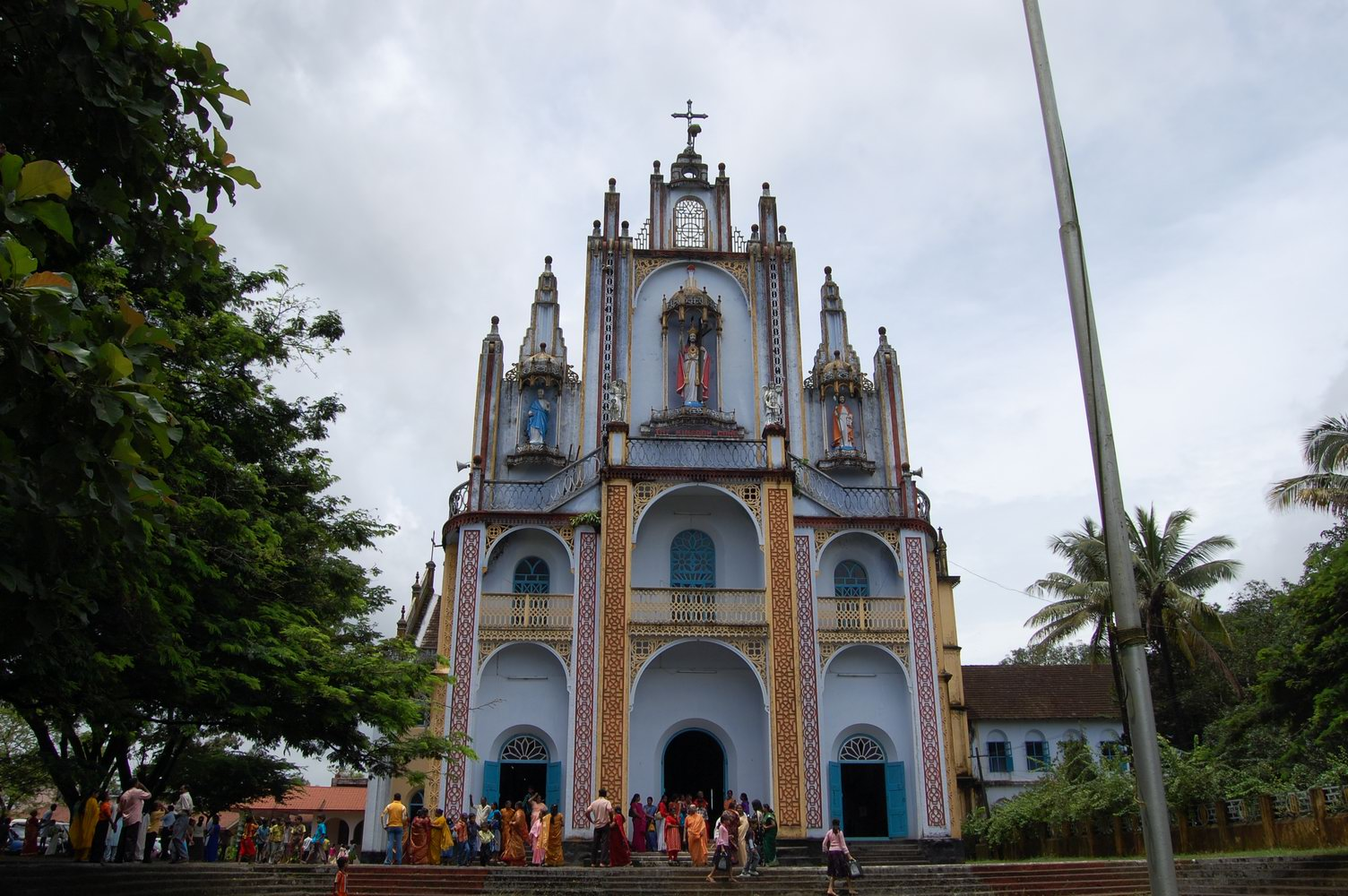
Christurajasramam Church

Located on the northern border of the erstwhile Travancore kingdom, Karukutty has been influenced by the cultures of both Travancore and Cochin kingdoms and has been cited in ancient Portuguese records. Remnants of an old fort, referred to locally as Kottathendu (കോട്ടത്തെണ്ട്), can be seen here. The fort - Nedumkotta (നേടുംക്കോട്ട) was built jointly by the Travancore and Cochin kingdoms to resist invasions by Tipu Sultan. Numerous other artifacts and vessels used by natives to store their treasures and valuables have also been excavated. There is a popular saying that goes "Karukutty kandaal maru kutty venda" (കറുകുററി കണ്ടാല്‍ മറുകുററി വേണ്ട). It roughly translates to "If you have reached Karukutty, then you need not go looking elsewhere" – a sign of the self-sufficient and prosperous nature of the locality.The name karu kutty means Dark fortress.

== Geography ==
Spread over an area of 33.57 km^{2} (12.96 sq mi) in central Kerala, the terrain is primarily of five types: plain land, valley, high land, sloped terrain and hilltops.

=== Borders ===
East: Mookkannoor panchayat
North: Chalakudy River and Koratty panchayat
West: Parakkadavu panchayat
South: Angamaly municipality
