= Puliyanam =

- village
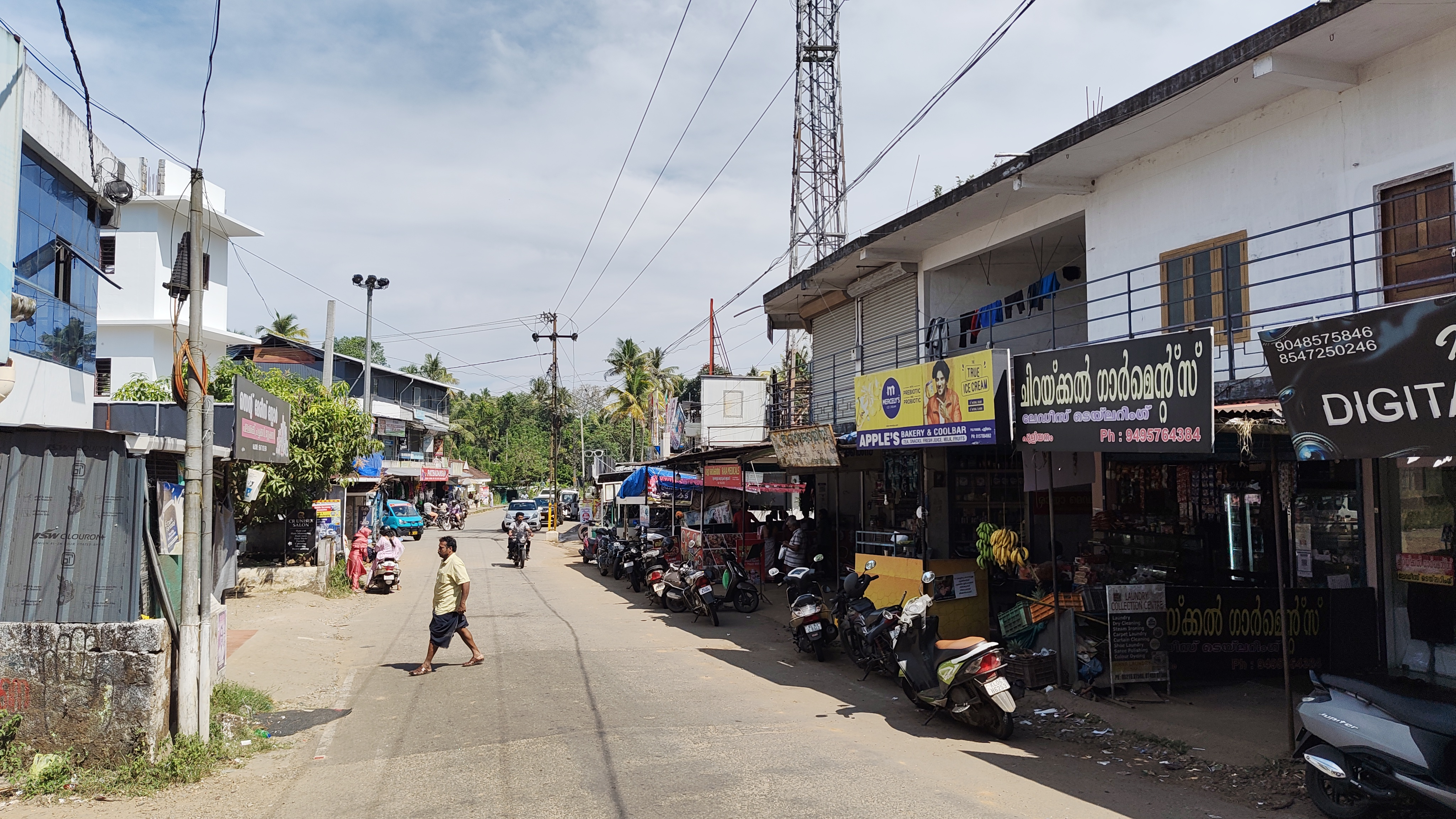
- Puliyanam Junction

- Location in Kerala, India
- Coordinates: 10.216001°N 76.354833°E
- Country: India
- State: Kerala
- District: Ernakulam

Languages
  - Official: Malayalam, English
- Time zone: UTC+5:30 (IST)
- PIN: 683572

Puliyanam is a small town situated near Angamaly, Ernakulam district, Aluva taluk, Parakkadavu Panchayat in the state of Kerala, India. It is 5 kilometres west from Angamaly and 11km north from Cochin International Airport. The nearest railway station is Angamaly.

It was once a forest with a canopy of tamarind trees (puli maram), and was called 'Pulivanam' which eventually became Puliyanam. An alternative explanation for the origins of the name is that the area was once inhabitied by leopards (puli). The word vanam means 'forest' in Malayalam.

== Economy ==
Puliyanam is famous for granite production. Puliyanam stone is used for making high quality idols for temples and various other complex granite shapes. There were once as many as 50 granite quarries.

Areca nuts were also a major source of income for the local economy. Other agricultural products here included rice, banana, Tapioca, coconut, Bean, trees and rubber.

== Landmarks ==
Puliyanam has two temples – Chirakkal Mahadeva temple and Bhadrakali Mattappilly temple.

== Culture ==
A local primary school established in 1947 later became GHSS Puliyanam.

The St Fransis LPS, Desasevini vayanasala, Kalamandalam Hyderali memorial kathakali club, United Arts & Sports Club, Millenium Arts and sports club, Ethernet Web Solutions, Navadhara club and Sneha Cultural Center are all situated in puliyanam.

== Notable people ==
The Mattappilly family were early residents of Puliyanam. The famous drama artist "Puliyanam Poulose"is from here. Parameswaran Namboothiri from Puliyanam Parakkadavu Madavana Mana was melsathi of Malikappuram temple in 2019.Gangadharan AK (Gangadas) ,former KSEB superintendent lives here.

== Gallery ==
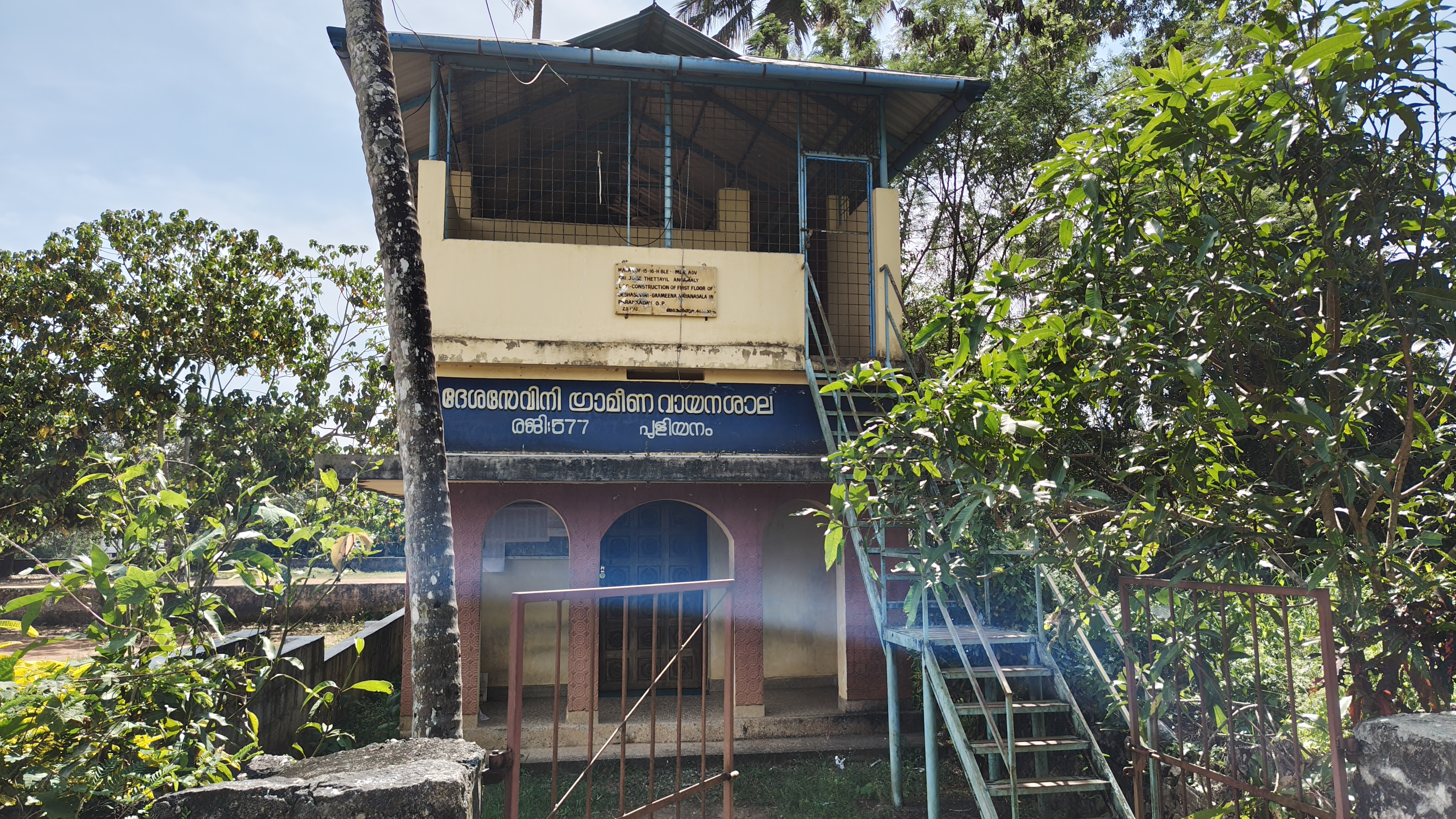
Desasevini vayanasala

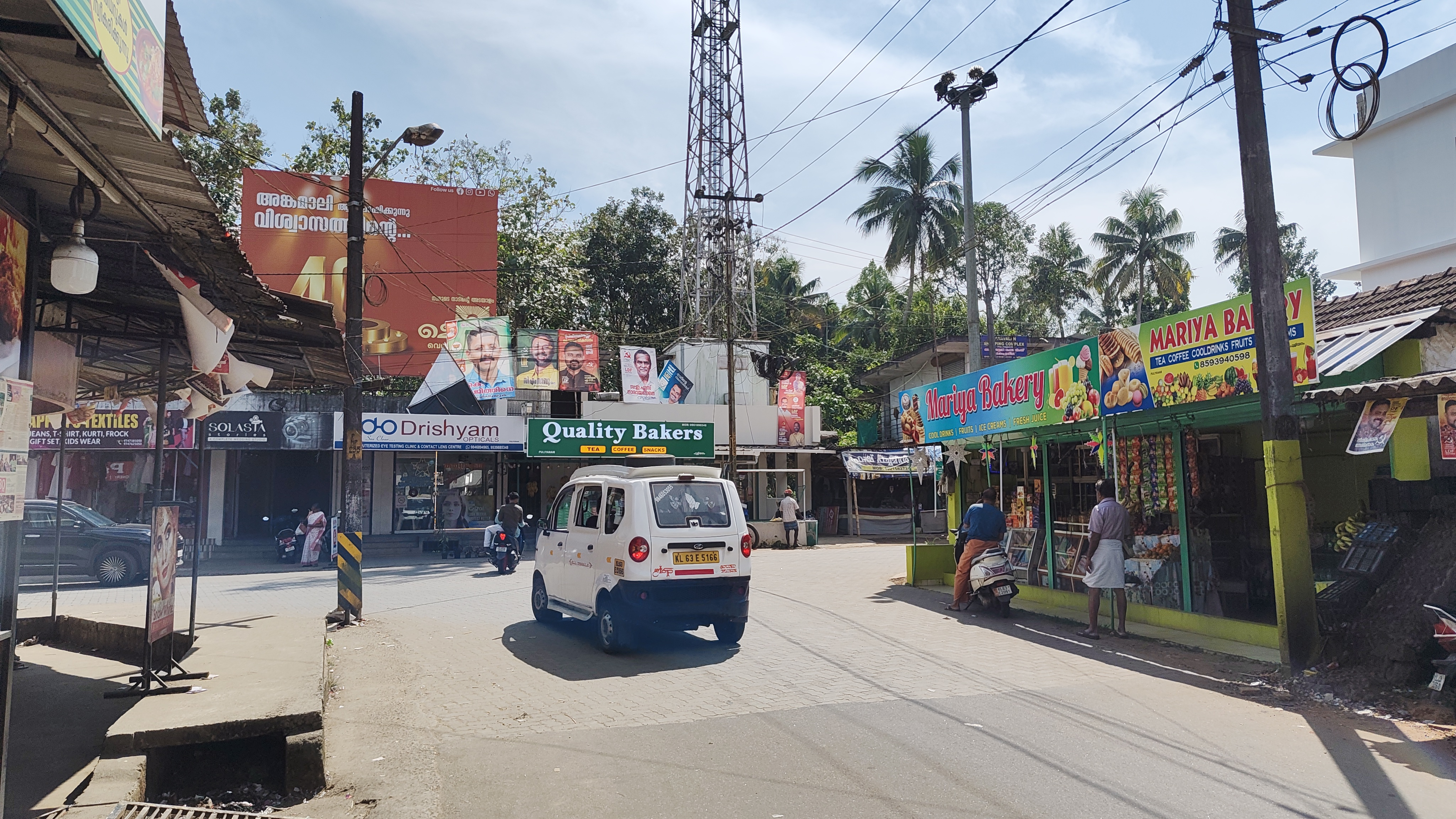
Puliyanam Junction

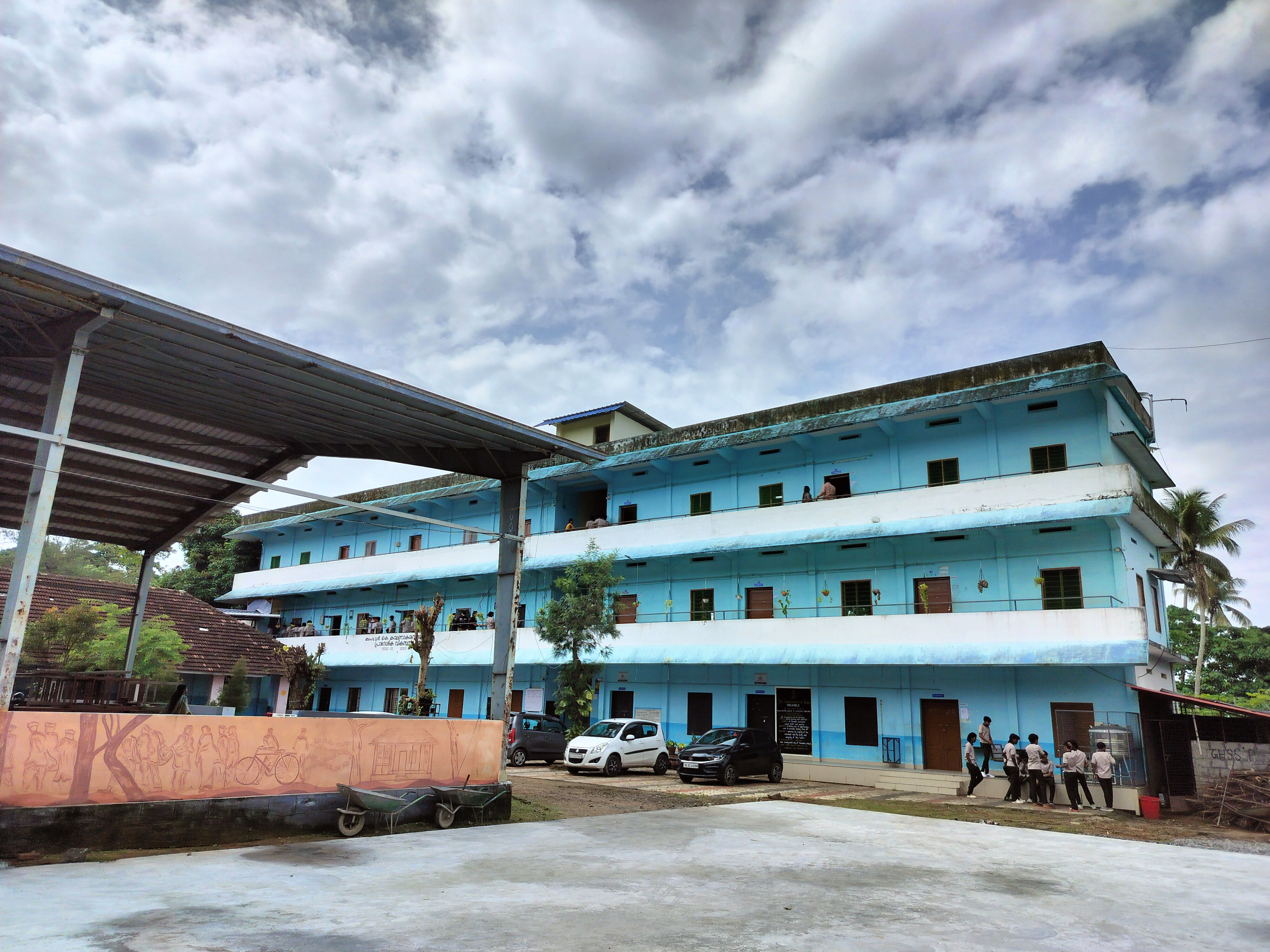
Govt HSS Puliyanam Higher Secondary Block

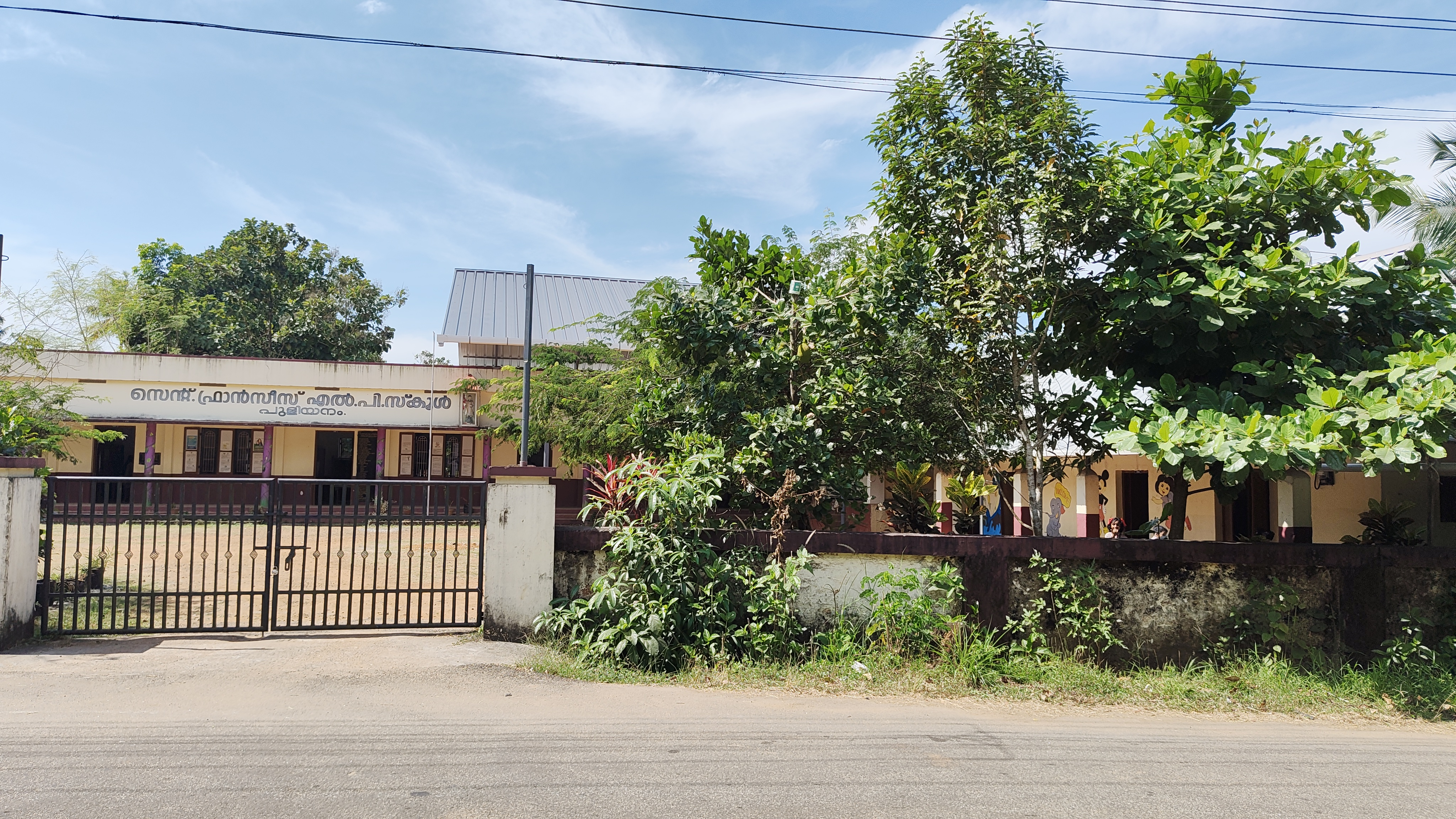
St Francis LP School Puliyanam

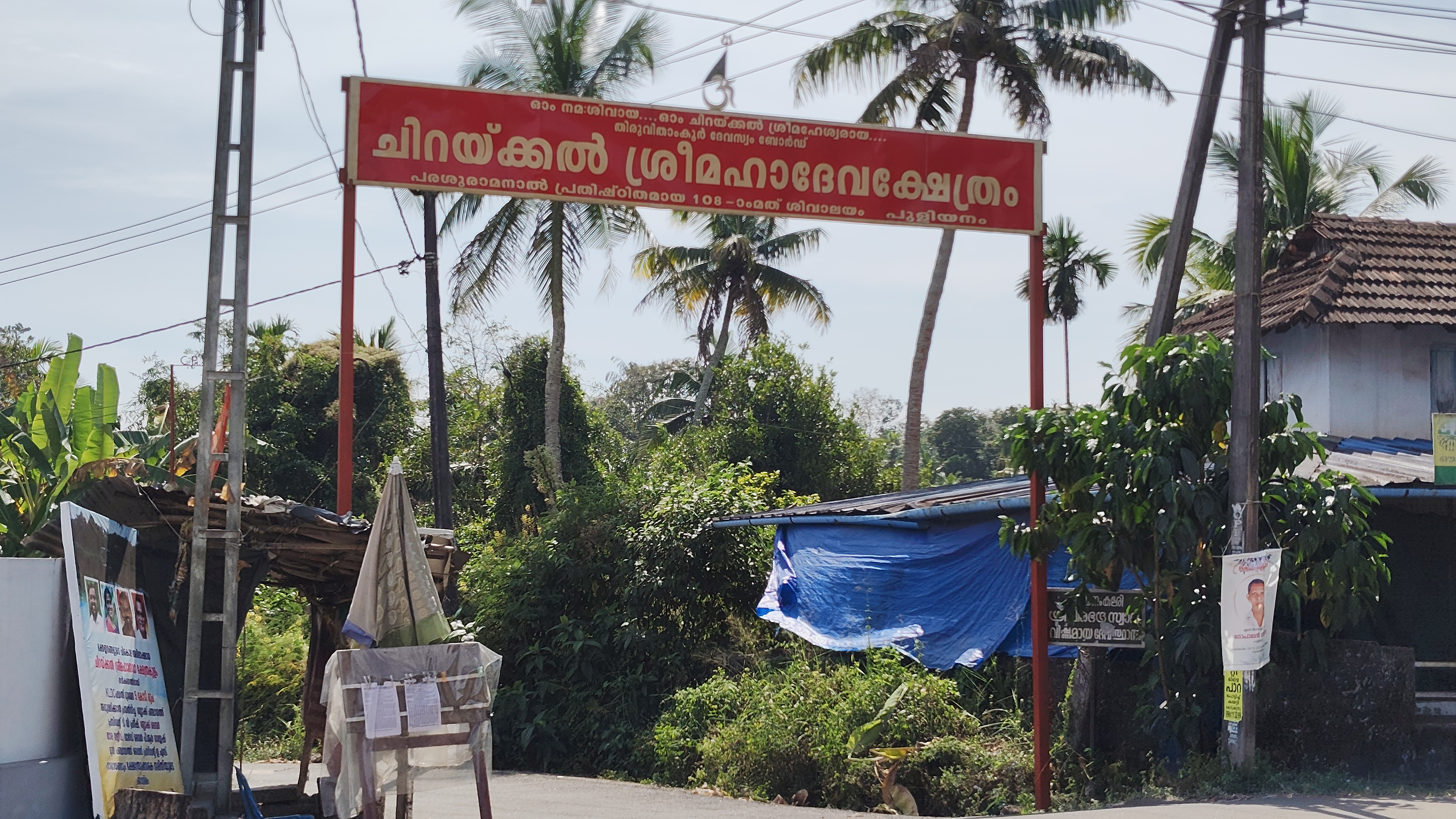
Chirakkal Mahadeva Temple Entrance
