= Post Graduate Diploma in Clinical Cardiology =

Clinical cardiology program

- Abbreviation: PGDCC
- Formation: 2005
- Type: Medical professional
- Location: India
- Region served: All over India
- Official language: English
- Affiliations: Ministry of Health and Family Welfare
- Website: www.pgdcc.icu

The Post Graduate Diploma in Clinical Cardiology (PGDCC) is a cardiology residency for post-MBBS doctors, provided by the Indira Gandhi National Open University (IGNOU) along with the Ministry of Health and Family Welfare, Government of India.

== History ==
Ministry of Health and Family Welfare started the PGDCC program in 2005 in association with IGNOU. It's a two-year full-time clinical residency program akin to National Board of Examinations' (NBE) DNB programs and trains medical professionals in clinical cardiology. It ran for six years and was the first cardiology course in the entire Northeastern states. It was launched by the former Health Minister of India, Dr. Anbumoni Ramadoss to develop a group of non-interventional cardiologists for rural cardiology development. PGDCC was open to MBBS degree holders. The course was conducted in 67 tertiary care hospitals, including seven medical colleges (government institutions included) nationwide. PGDCC was taught alongside DM and DNB cardiology programs, with shared teaching staff.

== Eligibility criteria ==
MBBS doctors must clear the CET national entrance exam and a viva in cardiology. Upon completing the program, they submit logbooks and sit for a final national exit exam, including clinical assessment and viva conducted by external professors. Passing candidates join the university's graduation ceremony to receive diplomas.

== PGDCC faculty & teaching institutions ==
- Padma Bushan Dr Devi Shetty
- Padmashri Prof Dr Vijayaraghavan
- Padma Bhushan Dr Naresh Trehan
- Padmashri Dr K.M Cherian
- Prof Dr George Cherian (CMC Vellore)
- Dr Ramakanta Panda

PGDCC course was conducted in the following medical institutes

- U N Mehta Institute of Cardiology & Research Centre - Gujarat
- Kerala Institute of Medical Sciences
- Medanta Delhi
- Narayana Hrudayalaya
- Fortis Hospitals
- Asian Heart Institute
- Bombay Hospital and Medical Research Center
- Gauhati Medical College and Hospital
- CARE Hospitals Hyderabad
- Assam Medical College
- St John's Medical College
- Pushpagiri Medical College
- Rabindranath Tagore International Institute of Cardiac Sciences
- BM Birla Heart Research Centre
- Frontier Lifeline Hospital (Dr. K.M. Cherian Heart Foundation)
- Krishna Institute of Medical Sciences
- Indira Gandhi Institute of Medical Sciences
- Apollo Hospitals

== Controversy ==
The IGNOU (Indira Gandhi National Open University) had applied twice to the MCI for recognition, but it was refused both times. The MCI cited reasons such as lack of prior permission from the Central Government, absence of qualification nomenclature in the Post Graduate Medical Education Regulations (PGMER) of 2000, and non-conformity with the Medical Council Act.

The Indian Association of Clinical Cardiologists (IACC) filed a writ petition against the MCI, and the Delhi High Court, after examining the relevant laws, ruled in favor of IGNOU in September 2019. The court held that IGNOU did not require prior permission from the Central Government as per the Indira Gandhi National Open University Act, 1985. The court directed the Central Government to consider the recognition of PGDCC qualification under the relevant section of the Indian Medical Council Act.

However, despite the court's judgment, the MCI and the newly formed National Medical Commission (NMC) came up with additional grounds for non-recognition, including nomenclature issues, mandatory examination inspections, and non-conforming hospitals. These grounds were deemed unsustainable as the retrospective recognition was granted to the Diploma in Cardiology of GSVM Medical College, Kanpur in 2019 without assessing the curriculum or inspecting the institution. Furthermore, the lack of a thesis or research projects by PGDCC candidates has also been considered invalid since no medical diploma courses in the country require a thesis.

In support of recognizing PGDCC, the All India Institute of Medical Sciences (AIIMS) recognized a diploma course in non-invasive cardiology in May 2020. This decision further highlighted the need for recognizing PGDCC. The retrospective recognition granted to the diploma in cardiology of GSVM Medical College, Kanpur in 2019 by the Central Government itself, without proper assessment and inspection, also strengthens the case for recognizing PGDCC.
