= Mazumdar Shaw Medical Centre =

- Narayana Health
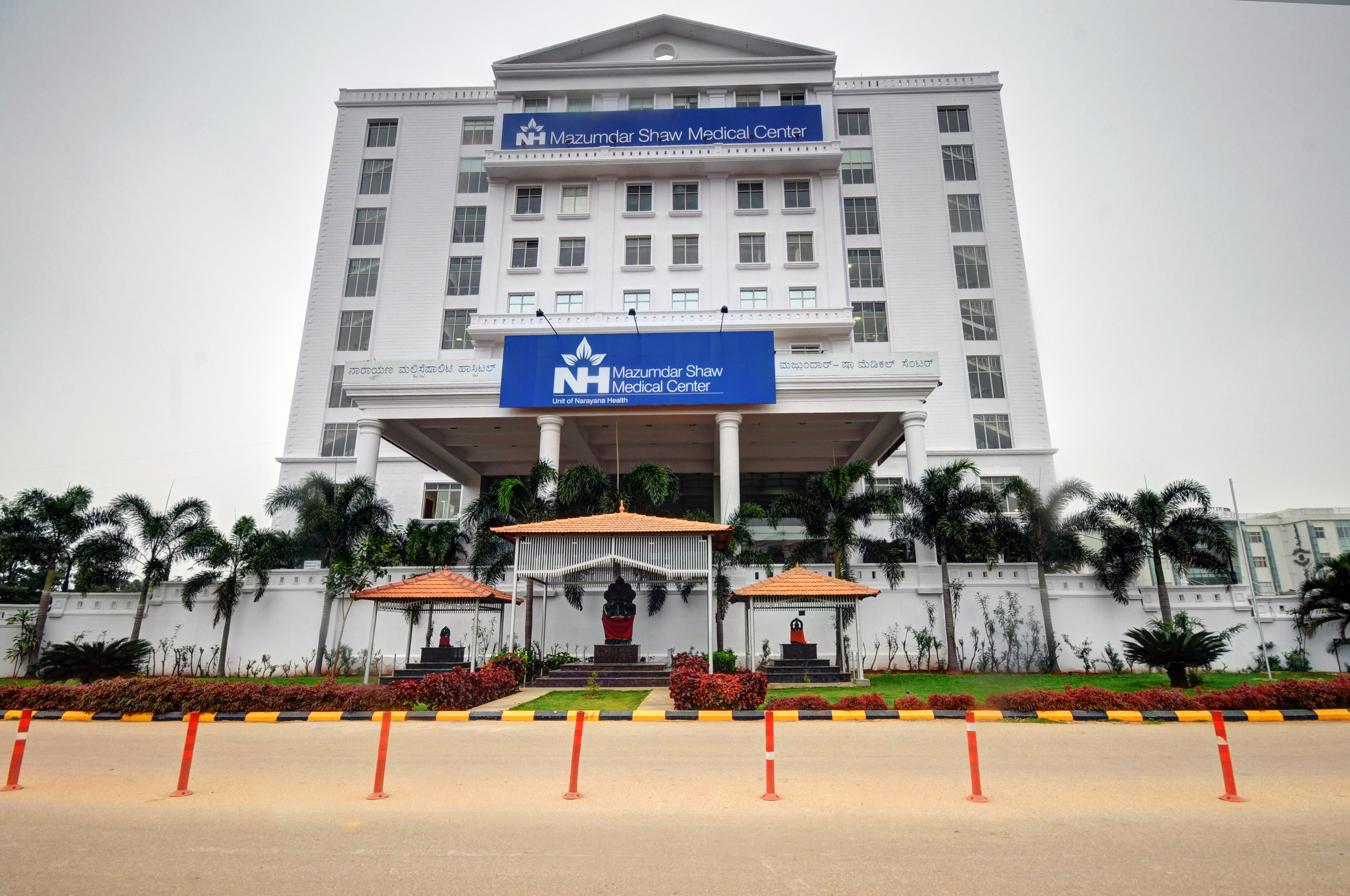

Geography
- Location: NH Health city, Bommasandra, Bangalore, Karnataka, India

Organisation
- Care system: Private
- Type: Multi Speciality
- Network: Narayana Health

Services
- Standards: NABH
- Emergency department: 24x7

History
- Founded: 2000

Links
- Website: narayanahealth.org

Mazumdar Shaw Medical Centre is an NABH-accredited tertiary care hospital inside NH Health City, Bommasandra Industrial Area, Bangalore, India. The facility is owned in partnership by the Director of Biocon Limited, Kiran Mazumdar Shaw and the Founder and Chairman of the Narayana Health Group, Dr. Devi Prasad Shetty. The hospital performs organ transplants and provides cancer therapy.

The hospital was established in the year 2000 and operates a bone marrow transplantation unit with a focus on the treatment of thalassemia. The hospital provides hematology and bone marrow transplant services for the Major S Nanjundiah and Shanta Nanjundiah Cancer Centre, an oncology wing of the Narayana Multispeciality Hospital, Mysore, which is operated by Narayana Health group. The unit also operates the Mazumdar-Shaw Cancer Center, which was established in 2009 for organ-specific cancer care. In 2013, Mazumdar Shaw Medical Centre launched a rural cancer surveillance program, in partnership with Narayana Health, to promote awareness of and conducting preliminary screening of head and neck cancers in rural areas of Karnataka, India.

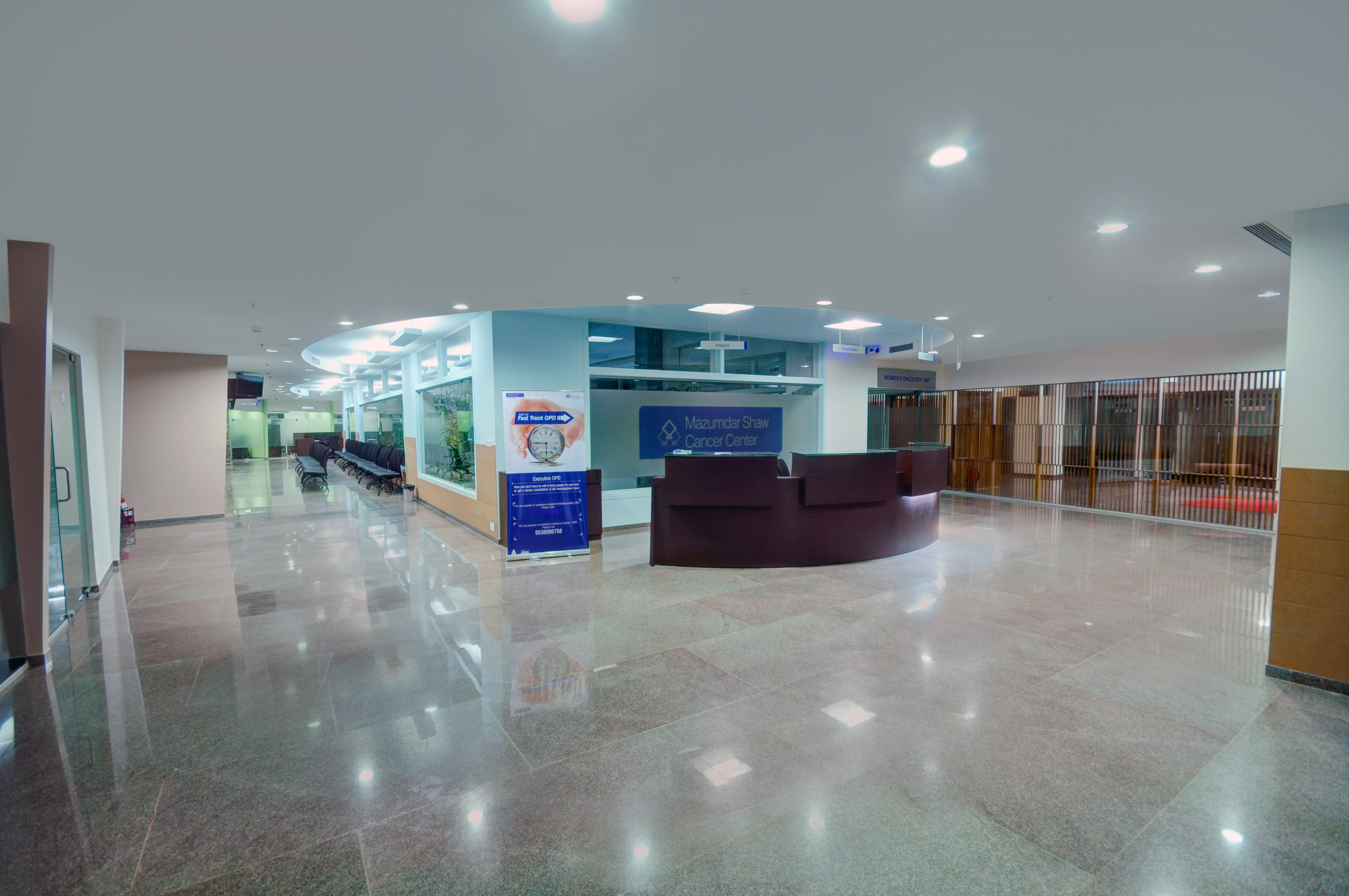
MSMC

The hospital's specialities include anesthesia and critical care, oral and maxillofacial surgery, oncology, pediatric surgery, plastic surgery, and thoracic surgery.

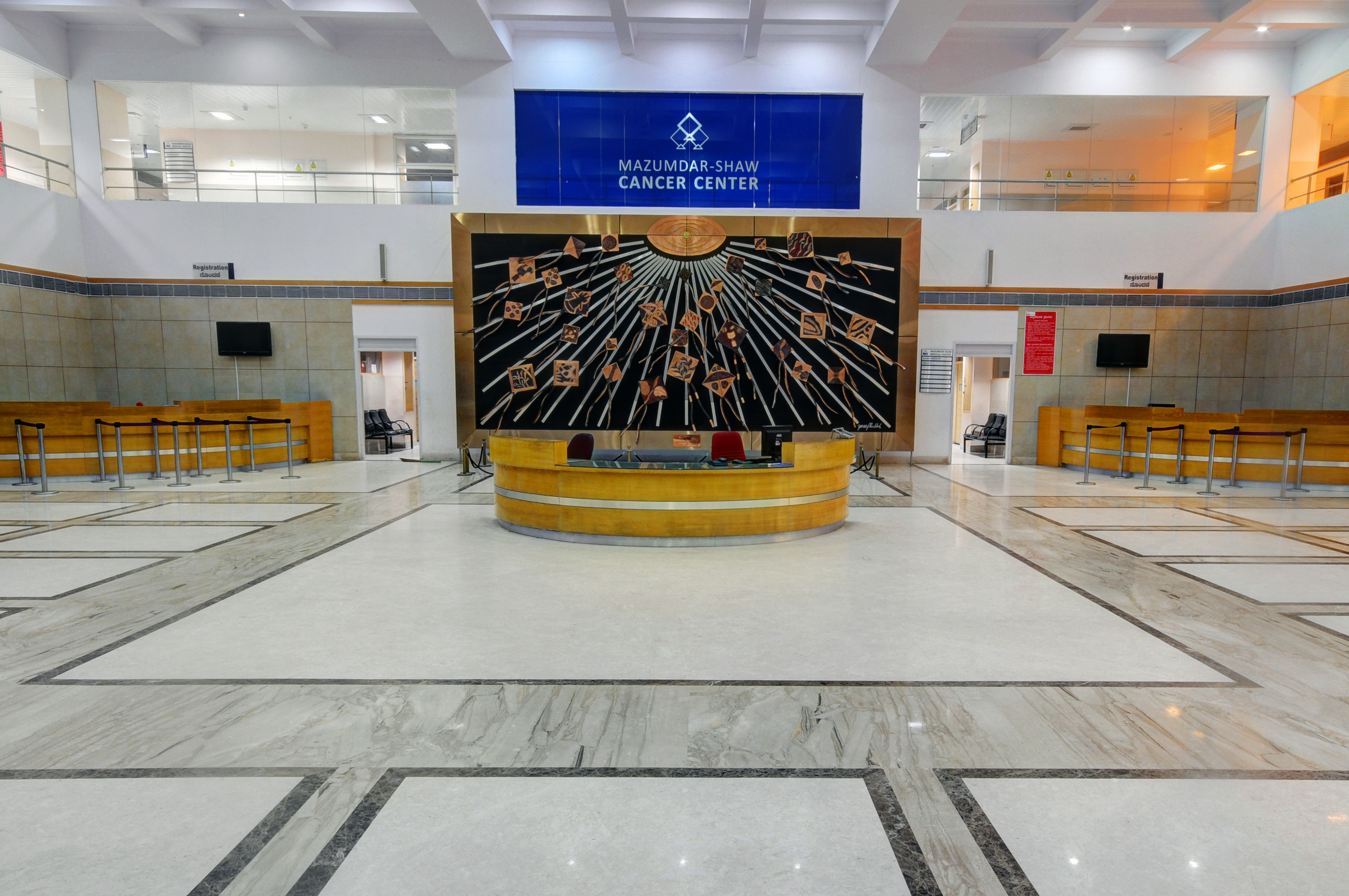
MSMC

It also has facilities for emergency and trauma services, radiology and medical imaging, a blood bank, laboratories, an ambulance service.
