= Indian Association of Clinical Cardiologists =

- Abbreviation: IACC
- Formation: 2008
- Purpose: Prevention of Cardiovascular Diseases (CVD) and the eradication of cardio-vascular mortality in rural India.
- Headquarters: Kerala
- Region served: India
- Publication: Annals of Clinical Cardiology
- Affiliations: European Society of CardioVascular Surgery; American College of Cardiology; American Heart Association
- Website: www.accindia.org

The IACC (Indian Association of Clinical Cardiologists), a non-profit organisation for non invasive cardiologists, was founded in 2008 by Dr. Rajesh Rajan, 4 Padma Shri doctors (such as Padma Bhushan Dr. Devi Prasad Shetty and Padma Shri Dr. Govindan Vijayaraghavan), Mohammed Shafiq and five other colleagues from Kerala Institute of Medical Sciences. Based in Kerala, this association works towards the prevention of Cardiovascular Diseases (CVD) and the reduction of cardiovascular mortality in rural India.

== Affiliations and activities ==
The association is affiliated with the European Society of CardioVascular Surgery, American College of Cardiology, and American Heart Association. It has partnered with the World Heart Federation to raise awareness of cardiovascular diseases and nutrition diets. Additionally, It has also worked towards increasing awareness about the co-relation between cardiovascular diseases and the environment.

The Indian College of Cardiology, the Cardiological Society of India, and the Kerala Heart Rhythm Society engaged in a public disagreement with the association in 2015. These organizations asserted that practicing cardiology by MBBS doctors with a Postgraduate Diploma in Clinical Cardiology (PGDCC) was both illegal and unethical. The Association argued that PGDCC is a full-time, two-year residency program in non-invasive cardiology that is taught by renowned cardiology professors and conducted in top teaching tertiary care institutions including government medical colleges. The American College of Cardiology, the American Heart Association, and the European Society of Cardiology have also recognized it.

The official publication of the Indian Association of Clinical Cardiologists is Annals of Clinical Cardiology, which is published by Wolters Kluwer.

== Conferences ==
The IACC Cardiozone 2015 held its inaugural zonal conference in July 2015 in Kozhikode, Kerala. It was attended by international clinical cardiologists, general physicians, and medical students. U. T. Khader, then Minister for Health and Family Welfare of Karnataka, had previously attended their 4th national conference in 2013. Following that, in 2016, Gruppo Ospedaliero San Donato (Milan) and IACC organised a conference in Dubai, concentrating on interdisciplinary approaches in cardiac care.

== IACCCON ==
The National Annual Conference of Indian Association of Clinical Cardiologists (IACCCON) is a yearly event organised by the IACC and is one of the largest conference for clinical cardiology in India. The objective of the conference is to establish a program to train a larger number of graduates in clinical cardiology to deal with the early recognition, management and prevention of cardiovascular diseases and associated diseases like diabetes and hypertension.
