= Narayana Institute of Cardiac Sciences =

- Narayana Health
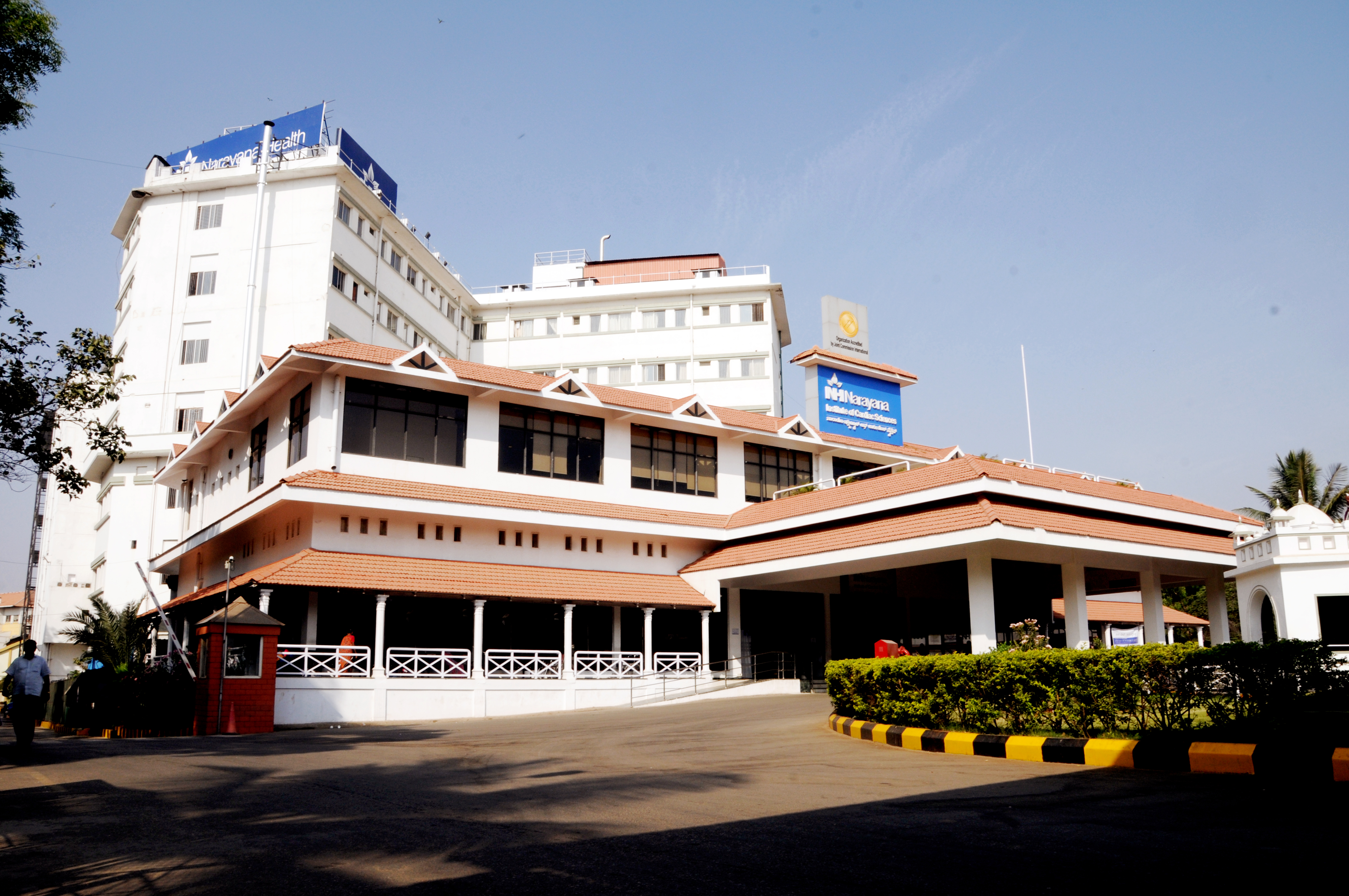

Geography
- Location: NH Health city, Bommasandra, Bangalore, Karnataka, India

Organisation
- Care system: Private
- Type: Cardiac Super Speciality
- Network: Narayana Health

Services
- Standards: JCI, NABH
- Emergency department: 24x7

History
- Founded: 2000

Links
- Website: narayanahealth.org

Narayana Institute of Cardiac Sciences (NICS) is a cardiac hospital in Bommasandra, Bangalore, India, operated by Narayana Health. Accredited by Joint Commission International and the NABH, the facility contains 23 cardiac operation theatres and five digital catheterization laboratories, including a hybrid laboratory for interventional procedures and complex heart surgeries.

The hospital was commissioned in 2000 as part of NH Health City by Devi Shetty, the founder of Narayana Health. The facility specializes in cardiac surgery and heart transplantation.

The hospital contains 200 critical care beds for post-operative care, a pediatric intensive care unit, and provides cardiac treatment for neonatal, pediatric, and adult patients. The facility includes a pediatric intensive care unit. It provides cardiac treatment for neonatal, pediatric, and adult patients. The hospital has a capacity of 60 heart surgeries per day. Procedures performed at the facility include heart valve repair, coronary artery bypass graft, pulmonary enterectomy, the Ross procedure, and ventricular aneurysm repair. It also provides electrophysiology services and left ventricular assist device (LVAD) implantation. The hospital performs transcatheter aortic valve implantation (TAVI/TAVR) and maintains a program for structural heart conditions. Treatments are provided for congenital heart conditions, including pulmonary atresia.

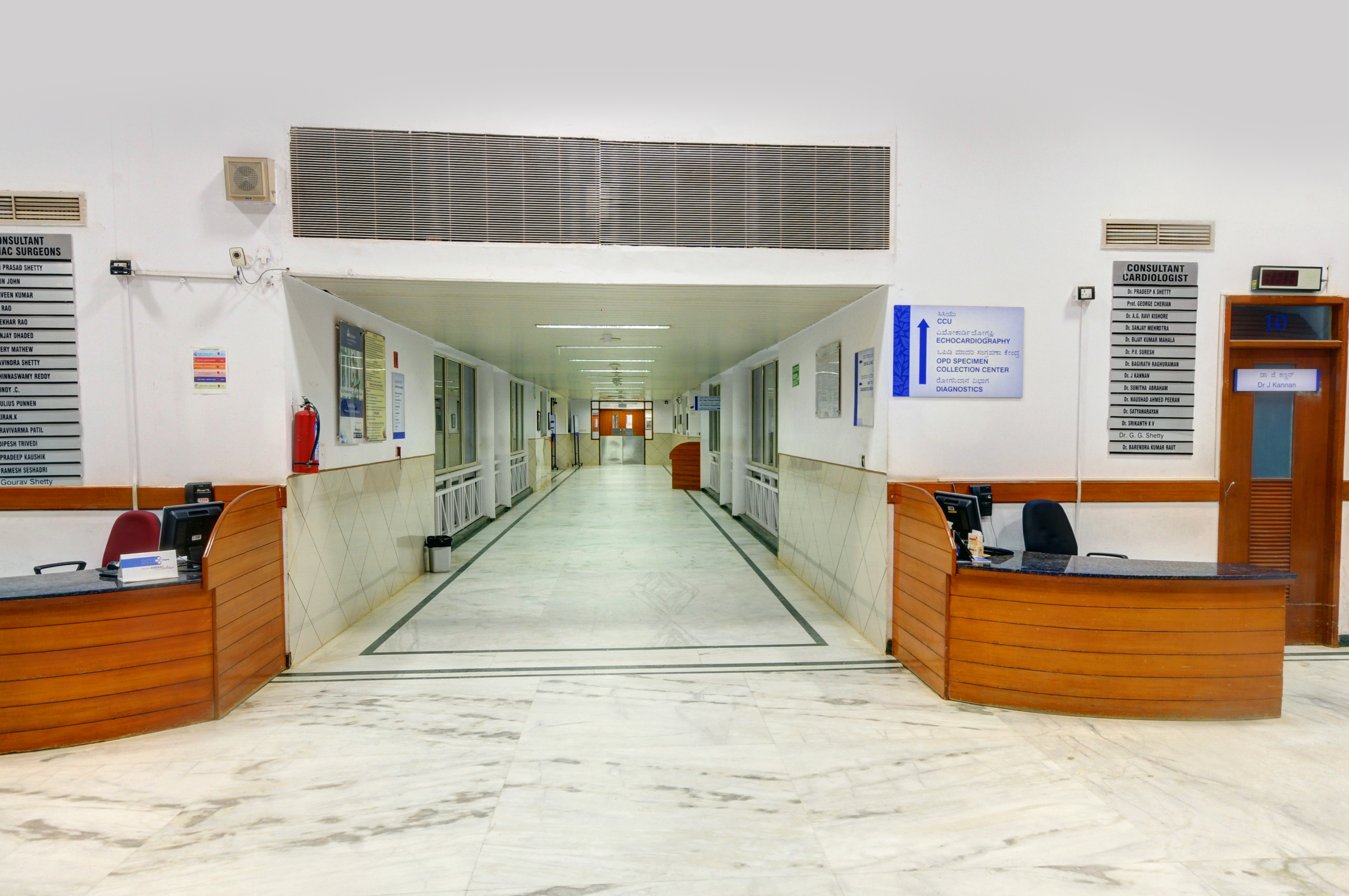
NICS

== Awards and achievements ==
In 2018, the hospital performed an artificial heart transplant, reported as the first in Asia. The institution was also named the "Best Single Specialty Hospital in India" for cardiology at the 2015–2016 India Healthcare Awards.

== See also ==
Narayana Health
