= Cayman Islands–India relations =

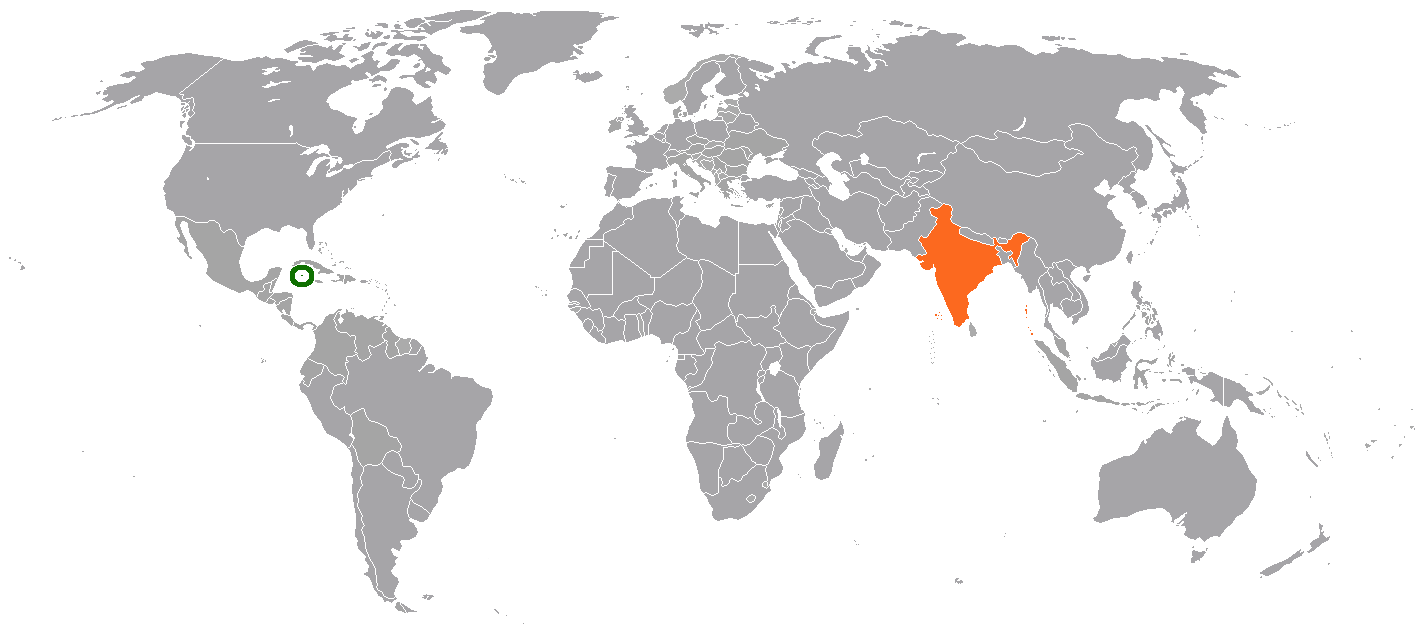

- Cayman Islands: India

Cayman Islands–India relations refers to the international relations that exist between the Cayman Islands and India. The foreign relations of the Cayman Islands are handled by the British Foreign Office. Therefore, India's foreign policy has focused on economic relations with the Cayman Islands, as well providing consular services to Indians and Caymanians. The High Commission of India in Kingston, Jamaica is concurrently accredited to the Cayman Islands.

== History ==
Premier McKeeva Bush, Minister for Health, Environment, Youth, Sports & Culture Mark Scotland, Cayman Islands Health Services Authority Canover Watson, and four other government officials visited Bangalore on 15–17 December, 2009. They had been invited by the Chairman of Narayana Hridayalaya to inaugurate the company's new Cancer Hospital.

The Indian Government offers scholarships under the Indian Technical and Economic Cooperation Programme to two Caymanian citizens annually. However, the scholarships have generally not been utilized.

== Economic relations ==
In April 2010, Bangalore-based hospital chain Narayana Hrudayalaya signed an agreement with the Caymanian Government to establish a hospital in Grand Cayman and a medical university to train doctors, nurses and paramedical students. The 107,000 square foot Health City Cayman Islands was opened on 25 February, 2014. It is the first foreign hospital owned by an Indian hospital chain.

The Cayman Islands and India signed a Tax Information Exchange Agreement (TIEA) on 21 March, 2011. This was the 22nd TIEA signed by the Cayman Islands and the 5th for India. According to the Cayman Islands Monetary Authority (CIMA), India was the ninth largest destination for remittances from the Cayman Islands in 2011, receiving US$2.5 million. The Bank of India operates in the Cayman Islands and maintains a branch in Grand Cayman. Cayman Islands-based NCBG Holdings, Inc. has proposed to invest in a 26% stake in a joint venture firm with Indian companies to manufacture wiring sets used in military vehicles, aircraft, ships and other defence machinery. The proposal requires approval from the Indian Government because it involves foreign direct investment in the defence industry.

In mid-2015, an Indian Supreme Court-appointed Special Investigation Team (India) (SIT) on black money, found that the Cayman Islands was the largest beneficiary of participatory notes from India, receiving 31.31% of the total outstanding Offshore Derivative Instruments. The SIT found that the Cayman Islands had a total investment of ₹85,000 crore (US$8.8 billion) in Indian stock markets as on 28 February 2015, or about ₹1.75 crore (US$180,000) per Caymanian citizen.

=== Trade ===
Bilateral trade between the Cayman Islands and India totaled US$3.54 million in 2015–16, declining from $6.75 million in the previous fiscal. India has not made any imports from the Cayman Island since 2013–14, when it imported $10,000 worth of residue and waste from food industries, and prepared animal fodder. The main commodities exported from India to the Cayman Islands are non-railway vehicles and spare parts, medical and surgical instruments, iron and steel articles, pharmaceuticals, and electrical machinery and equipment.

=== FDI ===
With $3.82 billion of investments, famous offshore tax haven the Cayman Islands was the fifth largest source of FDI for India in FY22, up from being the sixth largest in FY21.

== Indians in the Cayman Islands ==
As of summer 2023, 2,014 Indians, as well as their dependents, reside in the Cayman Islands, making up around 2.6% of the total population and 3% of the expatriate population. Most of the community is employed in the hotel and hospitality industry, or in security-related organizations. A small number are doctors, chartered accountants, and other professionals.

The Caymanian Government was the first foreign government to officially recognize Indian medical degrees.
