= IACC =

IACC may refer to:

- Infection-associated chronic condition
- Interagency Autism Coordinating Committee of the U.S. Department of Health and Human Services.
- International America's Cup Class
- International Anti-Corruption Conference
- Instituto de Aeronáutica Civil de Cuba
- Israeli antisemitic cartoons contest
- Indian Association of Clinical Cardiologists
- Instituto Atlético Central Córdoba
- Israel Association of Community Centers
