= Maruti Hospital, Tiruchirappalli =

Maruti Hospital

Geography
- Location: 95, Pattabiraman Street, Tennur, Tiruchirappalli, Tamil Nadu, India
- Coordinates: 10°48′36″N 78°40′49″E

Organisation
- Type: Private
- Patron: K. Anand (promoter and Managing Director)

Services
- Standards: NAHB
- Beds: 232

History
- Founded: 1997

Links
- Website: marutihospital.in

Maruti Hospital is a multi-speciality hospital located in Tiruchirappalli, Tamil Nadu, India. It was established in 1997, and offers emergency care, general medicine, interventional radiology, nephrology and andrology, neuroscience, plastic surgery, cosmetology, pulmonology, obstetrics and gynecology, cardiology, orthopedics, paediatrics and neonatology, surgical gastroenterology and ENT.
