= Brahmananda Narayana Multispeciality Hospital, Jamshedpur =

Hospital in Jharkhand, India

Brahmananda Narayana Multispeciality Hospital
- Narayana Health
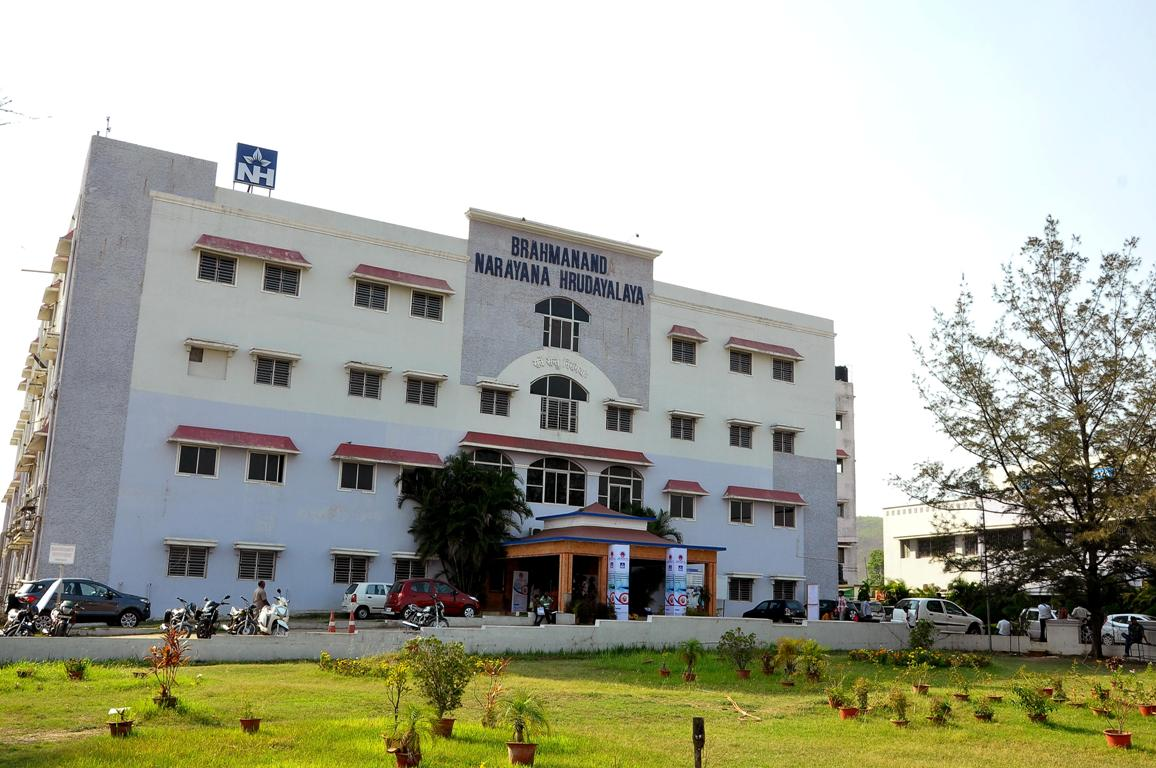

Geography
- Location: NH-33, Near Pardih Chowk, Tamolia, Saraikela Kharsawan, Jamshedpur, Jharkhand, India

Organisation
- Network: Narayana Health

Services
- Emergency department: 24x7

Links
- Website: narayanahealth.org

Brahmananda Narayana Multispeciality Hospital, Jamshedpur is a tertiary care hospital in the state of Jharkhand, India, operated by the Narayana Health group. The hospital provides cardiac surgery and cardiology, nephrology, an oncology outpatient department, general surgery, general medicine, gynaecology and dentistry. The hospital provides financial assistance to patients with the backing of local government organizations and NGOs for surgery and treatment.

The hospital was opened in July 2008 by Narayana Health and the Brahmananda Sewa Sadan Trust at Jamshedpur, Jharkhand, to treat patients across various socio-economic backgrounds. It was established and founded by the chairman of Narayana Health, cardiac surgeon, Dr. Devi Prasad Shetty.

The hospital has the first epilepsy clinic in the Jamshedpur city, and provides care for adults, the elderly and children. The hospital operates an ambulance with advanced cardiac life support (ACLS), a blood bank, a radiology department, 24/7 emergency and trauma services, 90 intensive care beds and five operating theatres.
