= Thiruvananthapuram Vikasana Munnettam =

Political organization in Kerala, India

Thiruvananthapuram Vikasana Munnettam is an urban political organization based in Thiruvananthapuram, Kerala that was floated as an alternative political movement for addressing the development needs of the city. The party was floated by pro-development organizations, professional organizations, social media groups, residential associations and citizen groups based in Thiruvananthapuram under the leadership of G. Vijayaraghavan, former State Planning Board member and S N Raghuchandran Nair, President of TCCI.

The stated objectives of the party were creating a pro-development, apolitical, alternative governing body and pressure group for Thiruvananthapuram city in the model of Twenty20 Kizhakkambalam.

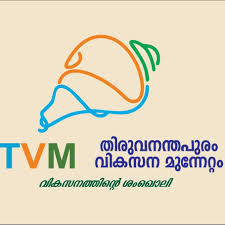
The logo of 'Thiruvananthapuram Vikasana Munnettam'

== History ==
The organisation was launched formally 1 November 2020 prior to the local self governing body elections under the aegis of Awake Trivandrum (a confederation of 70 organizations), including the Trivandrum Chamber of Commerce and Industry, Vyapara Vyavasayi organisations, the Federation of Residents Association Thiruvananthapuram, and the Confederation of Residents Association.

== Elections ==
The outfit fielded candidates in 14 wards of Thiruvananthapuram Corporation for the 2020 Kerala local elections. The candidates were selected through a formal interview conducted by Trivandrum Chamber of Commerce and Industry (TCCI). The outfit managed to a get a vote share of 6.9% in the 14 wards they contested and in Kinavoor ward they came third by winning more than 1000 votes. The candidates have all contested as independent under the banner of Thiruvananthapuram Vikasana Munnettam because it is not registered as a political party.

The organisation didn't announce any candidate for 2021 Kerala Legislative Assembly election.

== Criticism ==
There were allegations that the party was meant to aid Bharatiya Janata Party and is funded by Adani Group since, this political group was formed by Awake Trivandrum, a group that was formed to support privatization of Trivandrum International Airport. However, the leadership of the party have came out strongly against such campaigns and dismissed such allegations.

== See also ==
- V4 Kochi
- Twenty20 Kizhakkambalam
