= DNSH =

DNSH could refer to:

- 'Do No Significant Harm', the principle behind the EU taxonomy for sustainable activities
- The Dharamshila Narayana Superspeciality Hospital, in Delhi, Uttar Pradesh, India
