= Narayana Multispeciality Hospital, Whitefield =

Narayana Multispeciality Hospital
- Narayana Health
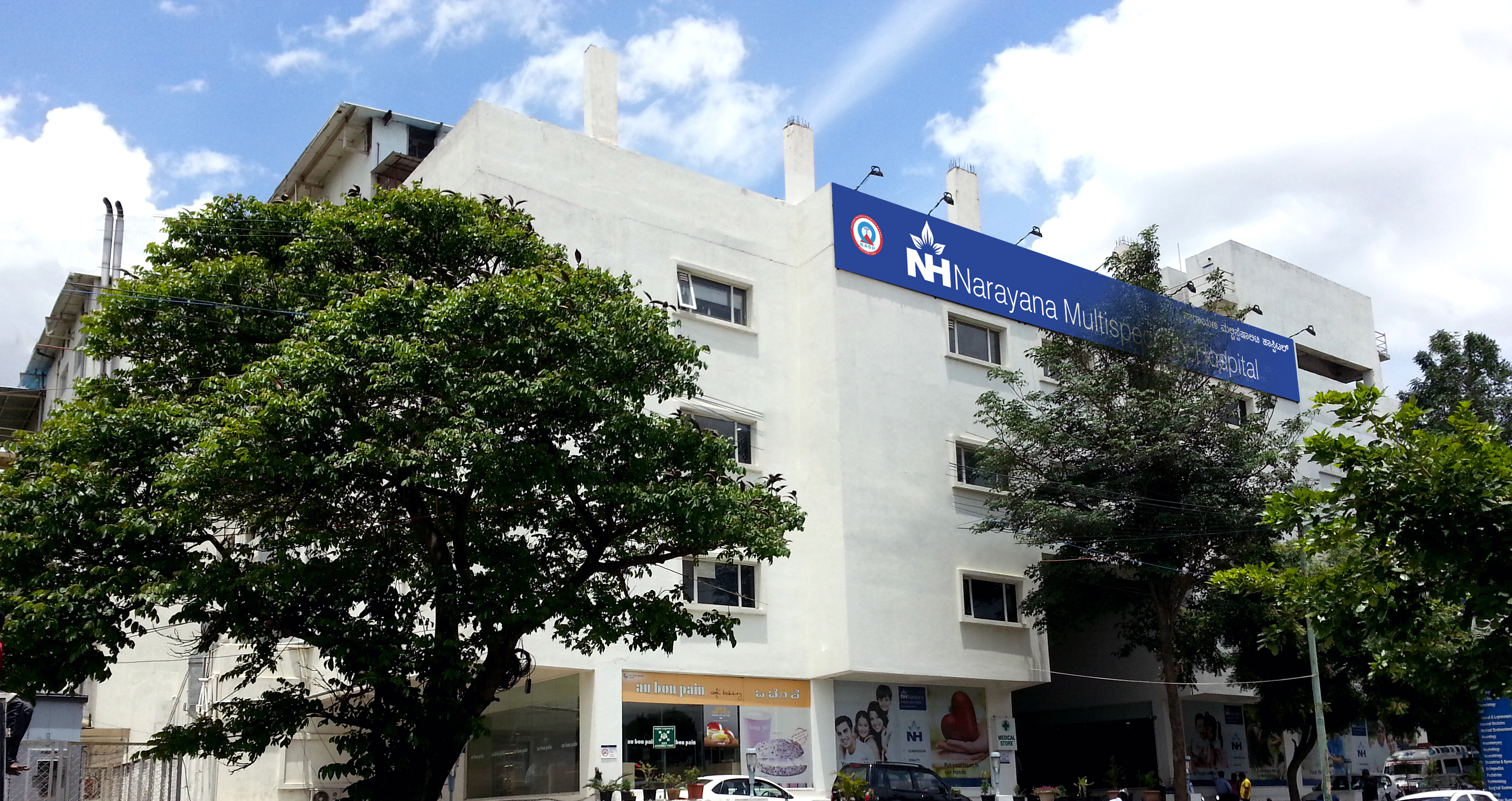

Geography
- Location: Plot No: 3&4, Sadaramangala Industrial Area, Whitefield, Bangalore, Karnataka, India

Organisation
- Care system: Private
- Type: Multi Speciality
- Network: Narayana Health

Services
- Standards: NABH
- Emergency department: 24x7

Links
- Website: narayanahealth.org

Narayana Multispeciality Hospital, Whitefield was a hospital of the Narayana Health Group in Whitefield, Bangalore, India. The tertiary care hospital provided orthopaedic surgery, renal sciences, women's and paediatric care, general surgery and critical care units for cardiology. The hospital's primary catchment areas were the neighbourhoods around the International Tech Park of Bangalore, including KR Puram, Marathahalli, Varthur and Whitefield.

The hospital was commissioned in July 2013 by the Chairman and Founder of Narayana Health, Dr. Devi Prasad Shetty. Shetty has led the establishment of NH's Hospitals in several states of India and Cayman Islands, North America.

The hospital housed a catheterisation laboratory, several critical care units across multiple departments, obstetric care that focuses on treating difficult pregnancies and premature babies, and accident and emergency care services. The hospital supported six neonatal intensive care units and a radiology and medical imaging department that includes CT scans, MRI, X-rays, Doppler tests, and medical ultrasound.

Its specialities included anaesthesia and critical care, adult cardiac surgery, ear nose and throat surgery, internal medicine, general surgery, neurology, renal sciences and nephrology. The hospital had a well established cardiology department which was headed by Dr. Sandesh Prabhu. The hospital had a cardiac Cathlab where high end complex procedures were done under the guidance of Dr. Sandesh Prabhu.

The hospital closed in November 2019.
