= 2020 Kerala local elections =

Indian municipal elections

2020 Kerala Local Elections
- 8, 10 and 14 December 2020

1199 of 1200 local bodies in Kerala (Note: Mattanur municipality elections are held in a different cycle, hence elections to this municipality are not held in 2020.)
- Turnout: 76.2% (▼1.5%)
Alliance	LDF	UDF	NDA
Percentage	40.2%	37.9%	15.0%
Swing	(▲2.8%)	(▲0.7%)	(▲1.7%)
Grama Panchayat	514	321	19
Block Panchayat	108	38	0
District Panchayat	11	3	0
Municipality	43	41	2
Corporation	5	1	0
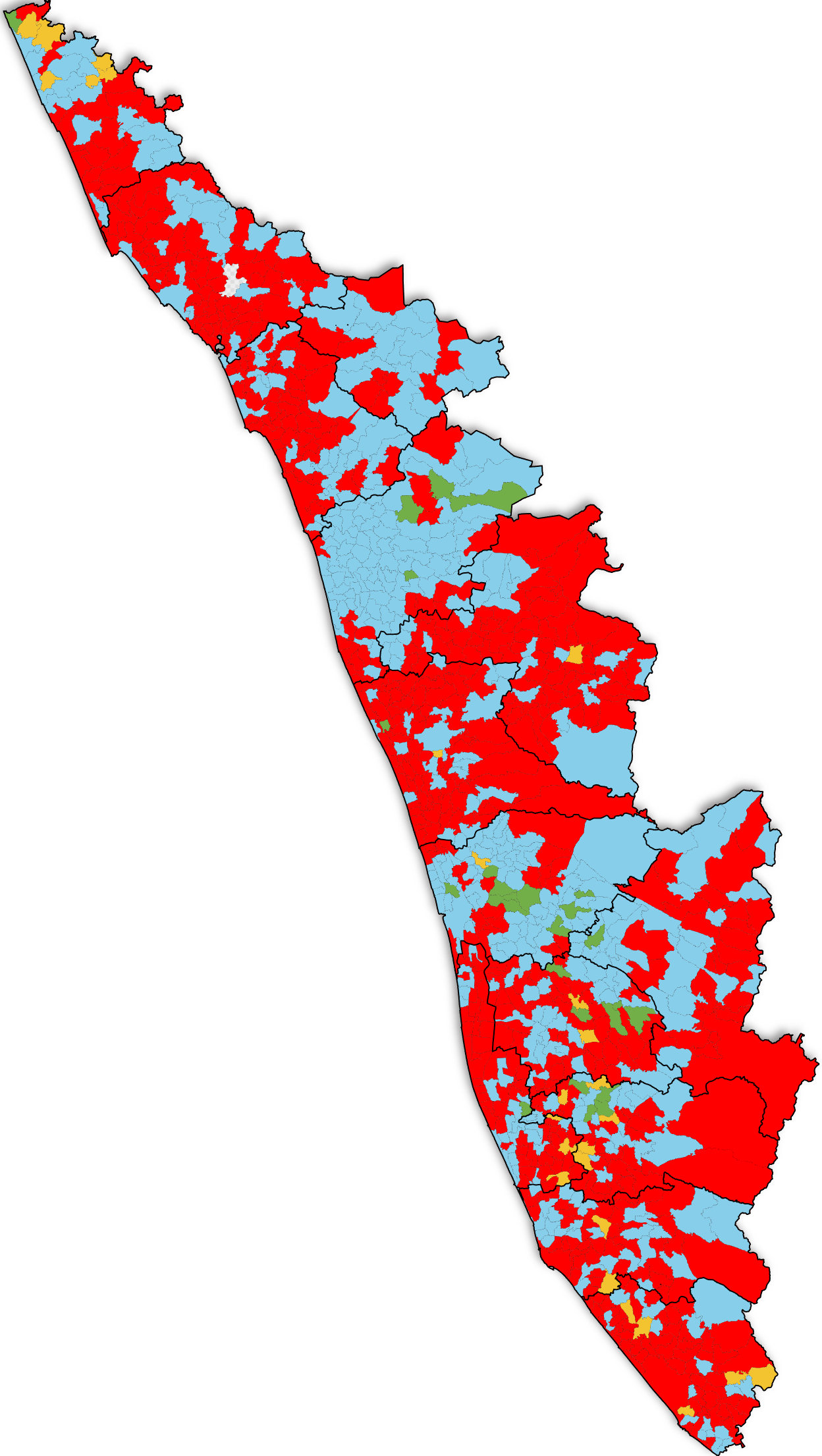
- 2020 Kerala local elections results

Elections to local bodies (Panchayats, Municipalities and Corporations) in Kerala were held in December 2020. Polling took place over 3 days; on 8, 10 and 14 December, with the votes counted and results announced on 16 December.

Left Democratic Front (LDF), who also formed the state government, won majorities in more than half of all grama panchayats, two-thirds of district panchayats and in all municipal corporations barring Kannur. United Democratic Front (UDF), led by Indian National Congress (INC), despite improving its vote share by 0.7% won just three out of fourteen district panchayats and one corporation, in comparison to seven and two respectively in the previous election in 2015. National Democratic Alliance (NDA), led by Bharatiya Janata Party (BJP), increased their tally of wards won and secured a majority in two municipalities and nineteen panchayats.

== Background ==
Kerala Panchayat Raj Act, 1994 made provisions for the creation of local bodies at the village, block and district levels. The Kerala Municipalities Act, 1994 made provisions for the creation of municipalities and corporations.

In total, the state has 1200 local self-governing bodies – 941 grama panchayats, 14 district panchayats, 152 block panchayats, 87 municipalities and 6 corporations.

=== COVID-19 pandemic ===
An all-party meeting filed a plea in Kerala High Court to defer the polls, which was set for November 2020, considering the increasing COVID cases.

An ordinance by the Governor of the state, which temporarily amended Kerala Panchayat Raj Act, 1994, allowed COVID-19 quarantined patients to vote via postal ballots and increases the voting time by two hours.

== Parties and coalitions ==
The LDF is the coalition of left wing and far-left parties, led by the CPIM. The UDF is a coalition consisting chiefly of centrist and centre-left parties led by the INC. The NDA is led by the BJP.

Twenty20 Kizhakkambalam, officially a nonprofit charitable organization formed by Anna Kitex Group, fielded candidates in five panchayats, including in Kizhakkambalam where they had won in 2015. V4 Kochi, an apolitical organisation had 74 candidates contesting in all wards of Kochi Corporation. KJS, led by Poonjar MLA P. C. George, contested independently in four district panchayats, four block panchayats and two grama panchayats in Kottayam district. Thiruvananthapuram Vikasana Munnettam an apolitical organisation contested in 14 wards of Thiruvananthapuram Corporation.

== Previous composition ==
Vote Share by alliance in 2015
1. LDF (37.4%)
2. UDF (37.2%)
3. NDA (13.3%)
4. Other (12.1%)

=== Local body wise ===
2015 Kerala local body elections
Local self-government body	Local Bodies in lead				Total
Local self-government body	LDF	UDF	NDA	Others/Hung	Total
Gram Panchayats	5F	365	14	13	941
Block Panchayats	90	61	0	1	152
District Panchayats	7	7	0	0	14
Municipalities	44	41	1	0	86
Corporations	4	2	0	0	6

=== Ward-wise ===
Local self-government body	Wards won				Total
Local self-government body	LDF	UDF	NDA	Others	Total
grama Panchayats	7,623	6,324	933	1,078	15,962
Block Panchayats	1,088	917	21	53	2,076
District Panchayats	170	145	3	4	331
Municipalities	1,263	1,318	236	259	3,122
Corporations	196	143	52	24	414

Municipal Corporations
Corporation	Wards won				Total	Alliance in majority
Corporation	LDF	UDF	NDA	Others	Total	Alliance in majority
Thiruvananthapuram	42	21	35	3	100	Hung (LDF mayorship)
Kozhikode	50	18	7	0	75	LDF
Kochi	23	38	2	11	74	UDF
Kollam	36	16	2	1	55	LDF
Thrissur	23	21	6	5	55	Hung (LDF mayorship)
Kannur	26	27	0	2	55	Hung (UDF mayorship)

== Campaign ==
The president of the Kerala unit of BJP K. Surendran claimed that the incumbent LDF government would face a setback in the election due to the 2020 Kerala gold smuggling case, in relation to which the Chief Minister Pinarayi Vijayan's then principal secretary was arrested by Enforcement Directorate. The opposition UDF faced several infightings, one among which an alliance partner, Kerala Congress (M), underwent a split with the faction led by Jose K. Mani joining LDF. BJP faced factionalism between some of its top leaders and the state president.

== Voters and polls ==
Voters list for the election was published on 17 June. The final list was published on 1 October with a supplemental list published on 10 November.

Voters list
Group of voters	Voters population
Male	1,31,72,629
Female	1,44,83,668
Transgender people	282
Total Voters	2,76,56,579

As the term of the current members of local bodies end on November 11, three-member administrative committees would be formed and take over administration in each local body, in accordance with Kerala Panchayat Raj Act, 1994, and the Kerala Municipality Act, 1994.

Kerala High Court dismissed petitions which alleged that reservation of local body constituencies continued for a third successive term citing that the court would not interfere in elections.

1.68 lakh candidates filed nominations to various local bodies, which was dwindled down to 74,899 candidates after the rest were either rejected or withdrawn. In total there are 34,744 polling booths; 29,321 in panchayats, 3,422 in municipalities and 2,001 in corporations.

Schedule
Event	Date
Publishing of final voters' list	1 October 2020
Announcement of election schedule Enactment of Model Code of Conduct	6 November 2020
Last date to file nomination	19 November 2020
Scrutiny of nomination	20 November 2020
Last date to withdraw nomination	23 November 2020
Polling	Phase I: 8 December 2020
Polling	Phase II: 10 December 2020
Polling	Phase II: 14 December 2020
Announcement of results	16 December 2020

Phase I: Thiruvananthapuram, Kollam, Pathanamthitta, Alappuzha and Idukki districts

Phase II: Ernakulam, Kottayam, Thrissur, Palakkad and Wayanad districts

Phase III: Malappuram, Kozhikode, Kannur and Kasaragod districts

== Result ==
Districts	Voter Turnout			
District wise map of Kerala	Phase	District	%	
Thrissur District Palakkad District	Phase I	Thiruvananthapuram	70.0	73.1
Thrissur District Palakkad District	Phase I	Kollam	73.8	73.1
Thrissur District Palakkad District	Phase I	Pathanamthitta	69.7	73.1
Thrissur District Palakkad District	Phase I	Alappuzha	77.4	73.1
Thrissur District Palakkad District	Phase I	Idukki	74.7	73.1
Thrissur District Palakkad District	Phase II	Kottayam	73.9	76.4
Thrissur District Palakkad District	Phase II	Ernakulam	77.1	76.4
Thrissur District Palakkad District	Phase II	Thrissur	75.0	76.4
Thrissur District Palakkad District	Phase II	Palakkad	78.0	76.4
Thrissur District Palakkad District	Phase II	Wayanad	79.5	76.4
Thrissur District Palakkad District	Phase III	Malappuram	78.9	78.7
Thrissur District Palakkad District	Phase III	Kozhikode	79.0	78.7
Thrissur District Palakkad District	Phase III	Kannur	78.6	78.7
Thrissur District Palakkad District	Phase III	Kasaragod	77.2	78.7
Kerala			76.2	

Vote Share by alliance
1. LDF (40.2%)
2. UDF (37.9%)
3. NDA (15.0%)
4. Other (6.90%)

=== Popular votes ===
All of the three major pre-poll alliances in the state increased their vote share compared to that in the previous election.

Summary of results of the 2020 Kerala local body elections
Alliance	Political party	Votes	Vote %	±pp
LDF	Left Democratic Front	8,450,430	40.18%	▲2.82%
LDF	Communist Party of India (Marxist)	5,628,188	26.71%	—N/a
LDF	Communist Party of India	1,459,396	6.93%	—N/a
LDF	Kerala Congress (M)	534,759	2.54%	—N/a
LDF	Loktantrik Janata Dal	293,814	1.40%	▲1.40%
LDF	Janata Dal (Secular)	175,613	0.83%	—N/a
LDF	Indian National League	139,016	0.66%	—N/a
LDF	Nationalist Congress Party	132,933	0.63%	—N/a
LDF	Congress (Secular)	45,215	0.21%	—N/a
LDF	Kerala Congress (B)	39,140	0.19%	—N/a
LDF	Janadhipathya Kerala Congress	1,612	0.01%	▲0.01%
LDF	Kerala Congress (Skaria Thomas)	744	0.00%	—N/a
UDF	United Democratic Front	7,988,255	37.92%	▲0.69%
UDF	Indian National Congress	5,327,605	25.29%	—N/a
UDF	Indian Union Muslim League	1,909,729	9.06%	—N/a
UDF	Kerala Congress (Joseph)	419,049	1.99%	▲1.99%
UDF	Revolutionary Socialist Party	171,483	0.82%	—N/a
UDF	Communist Marxist Party (John)	80,304	0.38%	—N/a
UDF	Kerala Congress (Jacob)	48,448	0.23%	—N/a
UDF	All India Forward Bloc	19,174	0.09%	—N/a
UDF	Bharatiya National Janata Dal	12,463	0.06%	—N/a
NDA	National Democratic Alliance	3,164,454	15.02%	▲1.74%
NDA	Bharatiya Janata Party	3,118,249	14.80%	—N/a
NDA	Bharath Dharma Jana Sena	26,336	0.13%	▲0.13%
NDA	Kerala Kamaraj Congress	14,358	0.07%	—N/a
NDA	Kerala Congress (Thomas)	4,975	0.02%	—N/a
NDA	Lok Janshakti Party	536	0.00%	Steady
Others	Social Democratic Party of India	132,423	0.63%	—N/a
Others	Twenty 20	41,845	0.20%	—N/a
Others	Bahujan Samaj Party	36,284	0.17%	—N/a
Others	Welfare Party of India	32,630	0.15%	—N/a
Others	Kerala Janapaksham (Secular)	27,995	0.13%	—N/a
Others	Peoples Democratic Party	26,223	0.12%	—N/a
Others	Revolutionary Marxist Party of India	24,899	0.12%	—N/a
Others	Aam Aadmi Party	10,539	0.05%	—N/a
Others	Janathipathiya Samrakshana Samithy	2,140	0.01%	—N/a
Others	Marxist-Leninist Party of India (Red Flag)	2,055	0.01%	—N/a
IND				
IND	Independents	1,206,878	5.73%	—N/a
Total		21,068,782	100.00%	Steady

=== Local body wise ===
Seat Share in Grama Panchayats (By alliance)
1. LDF (54.6%)
2. UDF (34.1%)
3. NDA (2.01%)
4. Others (9.24%)
Seat Share in Block Panchayats (By alliance)
1. LDF (71.0%)
2. UDF (25.0%)
Seat Share in District Panchayats (By alliance)
1. LDF (78.6%)
2. UDF (21.4%)
Seat Share in Municipalities (By alliance)
1. LDF (50.0%)
2. UDF (47.7%)
3. NDA (2.33%)
Seat Share in Corporations (By alliance)
1. LDF (83.3%)
2. UDF (16.7%)

2020 Kerala local body elections
Local self-government body	Local Bodies in lead					Total
Local self-government body	LDF	UDF	NDA	Others	Tie	Total
Grama Panchayats	514 (▼35)	321 (▼44)	19 (▲5)	23 (▲15)	64 (▲51)	941
Block Panchayats	108 (▲20)	38 (▼24)	0	0 (▼1)	6 (▲5)	152
District Panchayats	11 (▲4)	3 (▼4)	0	0	0 (Note: The ties were later resolved, LDF now control 11 and UDF controls 3 district panchayats. Refer Aftermath section)	14
Municipalities	43 (▼2)	41 (▲1)	2 (▲1)	0	0 (Note: The ties were later resolved and LDF now control 43 municipalities and UDF controls 41. Refer Aftermath section)	86
Corporations	5 (▲1)	1 (▼1 )	0	0	0	6

=== Ward-wise ===
Local self-government body	Wards in lead				Total
Local self-government body	LDF	UDF	NDA	Others	Total
Grama Panchayats	7,262 (▼361)	5,893 (▼431)	1,182 (▲249)	1,620 (▲542)	15,962
Block Panchayats	1,266 (▲178)	727 (▼190)	37 (▲16)	49 (▼4)	2,080
District Panchayats	212 (▲42)	110 (▼35)	2 (▼1)	6 (▲2)	331
Municipalities	1,167 (▼96)	1,172 (▼146)	320 (▲84)	416 (▲157)	3,078
Corporations	207 (▲11)	120 (▼23)	60 (▲8)	27 (▲3)	414

Municipal Corporations
Corporation	Wards won				Total	Previous alliance in majority	Alliance in majority
Corporation	LDF	UDF	NDA	Others	Total	Previous alliance in majority	Alliance in majority
Thiruvananthapuram	51 (▲9)	10 (▼11)	35	5 (▲4)	100	LDF	LDF
Kozhikode	51 (▲1)	17 (▼1)	7	0	75	LDF	LDF
Kochi	34 (▲11)	31 (▼7)	5 (▲3)	4 (▼7)	74	UDF	LDF
Kollam	39 (▲3)	9 (▼7)	6 (▲4)	1	55	LDF	LDF
Thrissur	24 (▲1)	24 (▲3)	6	1 (▼4)	55	LDF	Hung (Note: LDF later won mayorship over the corporation with support from independent members)
Kannur	19 (▼7)	34 (▲7)	1 (▲1)	1 (▼1)	55	Hung (UDF mayorship)	UDF

== Aftermath ==
=== Result analysis ===
All of the three major pre-poll alliances, LDF, UDF, and NDA, improved their vote share compared to that in the previous election. The result showed popular support in favour of LDF led government, led by Pinarayi Vijayan. Jose K. Mani faction of Kerala Congress (M), which left UDF to join LDF, performed well in traditional UDF strongholds in Kottayam, Pathanamthitta and Idukki districts. UDF improved its position in the districts of Ernakulam and Malappuram.Wayanad District Panchayat, Which Is A Stronghold Of UDF, Could Only Be Won By UDF On Tossing.

=== Reactions ===
Chief Minister Pinarayi Vijayan hailed his alliance's victory as that of secularism and inclusive development, while remarking that the results were a befitting reply to UDF and BJP. Leader of the Opposition Ramesh Chennithala said that UDF voter base was intact highlighting that they had won more municipalities and mentioned that he would introspect into their poor performance in Thiruvananthapuram corporation. BJP national president J. P. Nadda and state president K. Surendran thanked the voters for providing an improved mandate to their party in the election

=== TREND software error ===
The final results of a few panchayats and municipalities were changed due to an error in the TREND software, which was used for displaying election results, as per the State Election Commission. This meant that the lead UDF had over LDF in municipalities was cut from 10 municipalities to 4. The Election Commission published the results in its official website after rectifying the error.

=== Post-election incidents ===
LDF won control in 43 municipalities, UDF in 41 and BJP in 2 municipalities. In Kalamassery municipality, UDF won control of the municipality by drawing lots, as both they and LDF had equal backing in the administrative council. LDF also controls 11 district panchayats, while UDF got the remaining 3. The latter assumed control of Wayanad district panchayat after drawing lots.

21 year old Arya Rajendran became the mayor of Thiruvananthapuram corporation, thereby becoming the youngest ever mayor of a municipal corporation in India.

Reshma Mariam Roy, who was the youngest candidate in the elections, became the youngest ever president of a panchayat in Kerala at 21 years old after being elected as the president of Aruvappulam Grama panchayat in Pathanamthitta. She had filed her nomination on November 18, days before she turned 21.

== See also ==
- Elections in Kerala
- 2015 Kerala local body elections
- 2016 Kerala Legislative Assembly election
- 2021 Kerala Legislative Assembly election
- 2020 Paravur Municipal election
