= Narayana Multispeciality Hospital, HSR Layout =

Hospital in Bangalore, India

Narayana Multispeciality Hospital
- Narayana Health
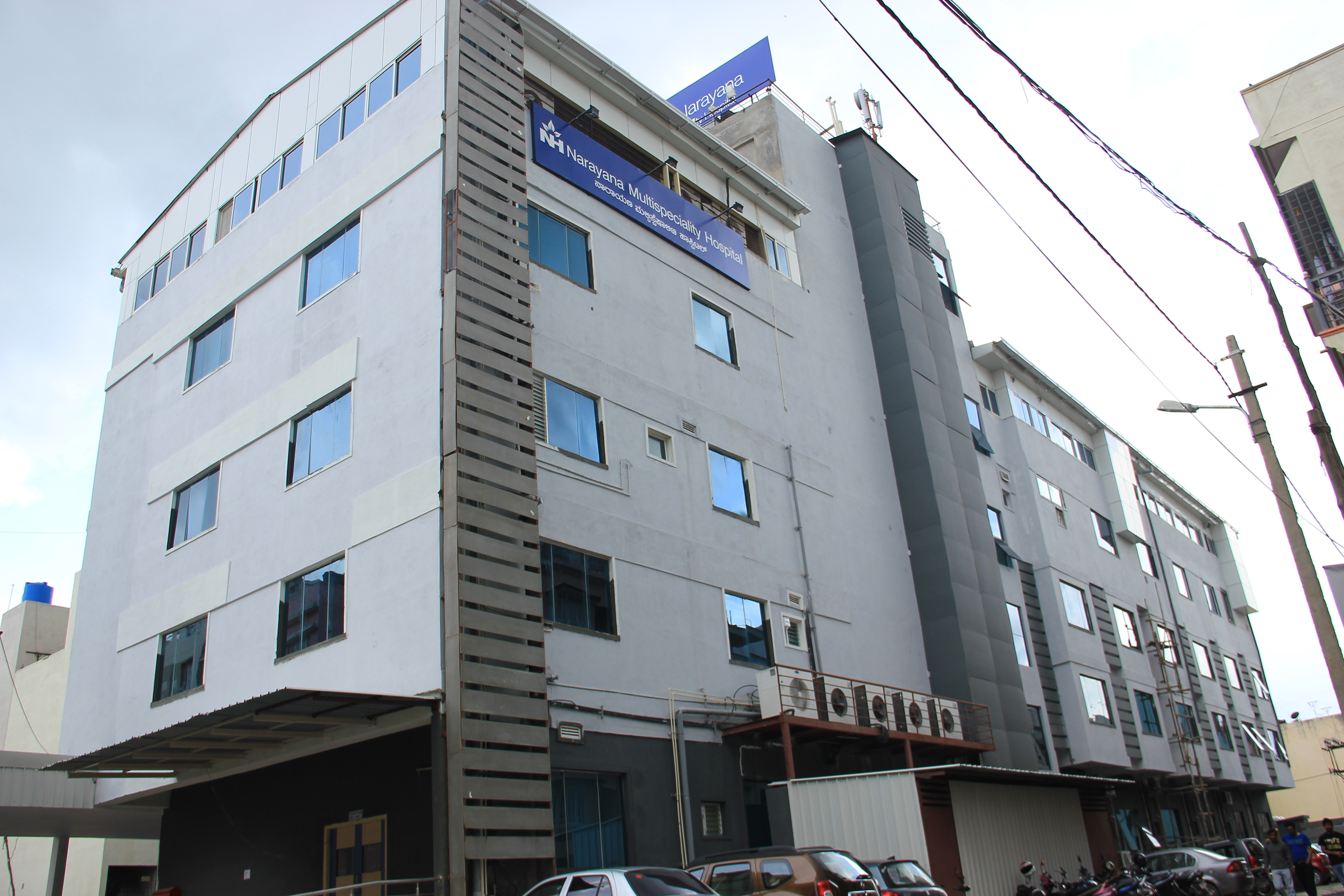

Geography
- Location: Basant Health Centre Building No.1, No.1, 18th Main Sector 3, HSR Layout, Bengaluru, Karnataka, India

Organisation
- Care system: Private
- Type: Multi speciality

Services
- Standards: NABH
- Emergency department: 24x7

Links
- Website: narayanahealth.org

Narayana Multispecialty Hospital, HSR Layout is a hospital in Bangalore, India and is part of the Narayana Health Group of Hospitals. The main specialties of the hospital are Cardiology, Orthopedics, General Medicine, day care surgeries, gastroenterology, obstetrics and genecology and emergency services. The hospital is NABH accredited, and has three operating theaters and a catheterisation laboratory. The hospital services the residential communities residing in and around HSR Layout.

The hospital was commissioned in July 2013, and founded by cardiac surgeon Dr. Devi Prasad Shetty, who has performed nearly 15,000 cardiac surgeries. It provides services for non-invasive cardiology procedures, dialysis critical care units and radiology.
