= Kanchi Kamakoti Childs Trust Hospital =

Kanchi Kamakoti CHILDS Trust Hospital
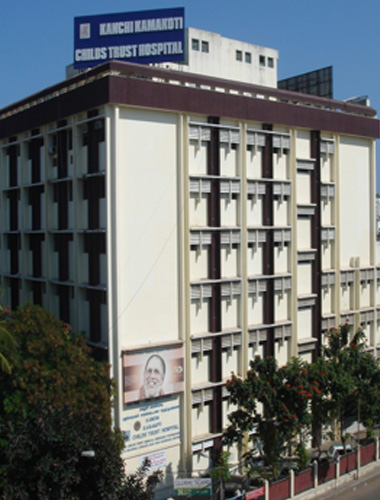

Geography
- Location: 12 A, Nageswara Rd, Tirumurthy Nagar, Tamil Nadu
- Coordinates: 13.057341°N 80.245786°E

Services
- Beds: 200

Links
- Website: kkcth.org

The Kanchi Kamakoti CHILDS Trust Hospital is a 200-bed exclusive pediatric care hospital situated in Nungambakkam, Chennai, India. The hospital was founded in April, 1978 as the CHILDS Trust Hospital by late Dr MS Ramakrishnan. In October 1999, the management was taken over by the Kanchi Mutt and was renamed as the Kanchi Kamakoti CHILDS Trust Hospital.

The hospital is a tertiary care referral hospital and is accredited by the NABH. It was named as the best pediatric care hospital in the country by the American magazine Newsweek in 2021.
