= Health in the Cayman Islands =

In 2003, the Cayman Islands became the first country in the world to mandate health insurance for all residents. There are four hospitals in the Cayman Islands. Grand Cayman is home to the private Health City Cayman Islands, as well as the Chrissie Tomlinson Memorial Hospital. The public hospitals are the Cayman Islands Hospital (commonly known as the George Town Hospital); and Faith Hospital on Cayman Brac.

== Resources ==
Emergency Medical Services are provided by paramedics and Emergency Medical Technicians using ambulances based in George Town, West Bay and North Side in Grand Cayman and in Cayman Brac. EMS is managed by the Government's Health Services Authority.

In 2007, a magnetic resonance imaging (MRI) unit was installed at the Chrissie Tomlinson Memorial Hospital, replacing the one destroyed by Hurricane Ivan in 2004. In 2009, a stand-alone open MRI facility was opened. This centre provides MRI, CT, X-ray and DEXA (bone density) scanning. Also housed in this building is the Heart Health Centre, which provides ultrasound, nuclear medicine, echocardiography and cardiac stress testing.

For divers and others in need of hyperbaric oxygen therapy, there is a two-person recompression chamber at the Cayman Islands Hospital on Grand Cayman, run by Cayman Hyperbaric Services. Hyperbaric Services has also built a hyperbaric unit at Faith Hospital in Cayman Brac.

== See also ==
- COVID-19 pandemic in the Cayman Islands
- Health City Cayman Islands
