= Narayana Multispeciality Hospital, Ahmedabad =

Narayana Multispeciality Hospital
- Narayana Health
- Location within Ahmedabad Location within Gujarat Location within India

Geography
- Location: Chakudiya Mahadev Rakhiyal Cross Road, Ahmadabad, Gujarat
- Coordinates: 23.022424°N 72.623402°E

Organisation
- Care system: Private
- Type: Multi Speciality
- Network: Narayana Health

Services
- Emergency department: 24x7

Links
- Website: narayanahealth.org

Narayana Multispeciality Hospital, Ahmedabad is a tertiary care hospital in Ahmedabad, Gujarat, India, which treats patients in Gujarat and southern Rajasthan. The hospital is a part of Narayana Health group, (formerly known as Narayana Hrudyalaya Private Limited) headquartered in Bengaluru, which was founded in 2000 by cardiac surgeon Dr. Devi Prasad Shetty.

== Services ==
It provides pediatric and adult cardiac care, neurology, orthopaedics, nephrology and urology, obstetrics and gynaecology, general medicine, ear nose and throat, paediatrics and neonatology, pulmonology, orthopaedics and oncology.

It has a digital catheterisation laboratory, a coronary care unit, and an intensive therapy unit. For conditions like disc prolapse, spinal fractures and spinal tumors, the neurosciences department offers minimally invasive spine surgery and microsurgery, and the orthopaedics department provides replacement surgery for knee, hip and shoulder.
