= Narayana Superspeciality Hospital, Guwahati =

Narayana Superspeciality Hospital
- Narayana Health
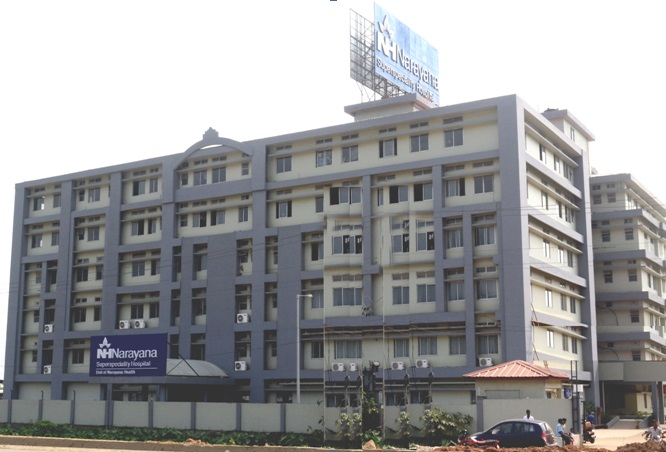

Geography
- Location: Tularam Bafna Civil Hospital Complex, Amingoan, North Guwahati, Assam, India
- Coordinates: 26.207774°N 91.677652°E

Organisation
- Care system: Private
- Type: Super speciality
- Network: Narayana Health

Services
- Standards: NABH for hospital, NABL for laboratory
- Emergency department: Yes

Links
- Website: www.narayanahealth.org/hospitals/guwahati/narayana-superspeciality-hospital-guwahati%20narayanahealth.org
- Lists: Hospitals in India

Narayana Superspeciality Hospital, Guwahati is a tertiary care hospital of the Narayana Health group in Guwahati, Assam, India. Its main medical specialities are internal medicine, cardiology and cardiac sciences, neurology and neurosurgery, orthopaedics and joint replacement, and critical care facilities for adults, the elderly and children.

It was commissioned in December 2013 under a public–private partnership with the Government of Assam, and treats patients from Guwahati and other areas of North East India.

The hospital provides tertiary healthcare for internal medicine, cardiology, and provides a dialysis unit, radiology, physiotherapy, diabetology, endocrinology, internal medicine, general surgery and critical care, and operates a 20-bed oncology wing with a medical linac. It also operates a coronary artery disease care unit, intensive therapy unit, and a digital catheterisation laboratory for both, the elderly and children. The hospital is also supported by a NABL accredited laboratory for biochemistry, pathology and microbiology samples.
