= Rabindranath Tagore International Institute of Cardiac Sciences =

- Narayana Health
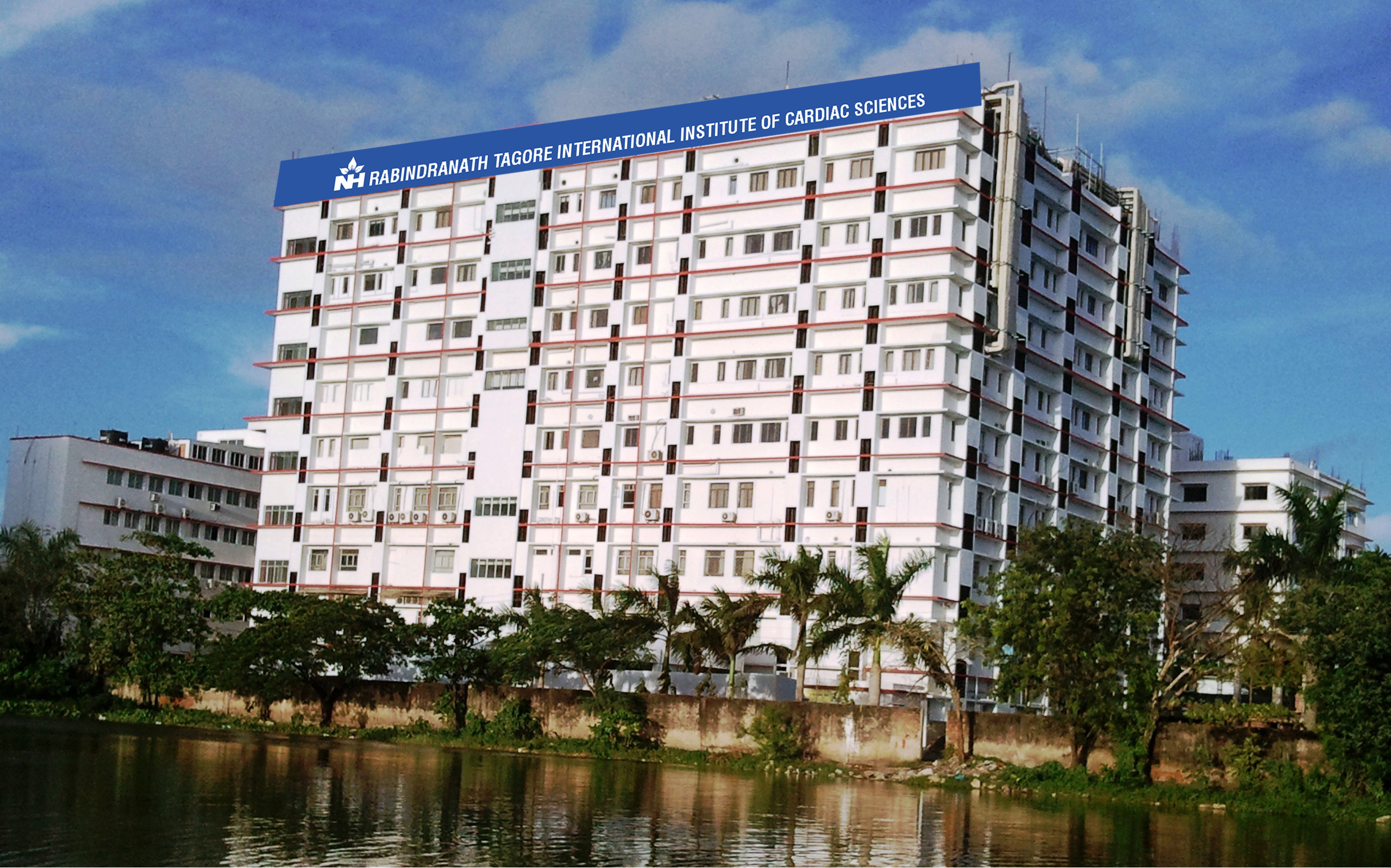

Geography
- Location: Rabindranath Tagore International Institute of Cardiac Sciences, Stadium Colony, Mukundapur, Kolkata, West Bengal, India

Organisation
- Care system: Private
- Type: Multi-speciality
- Network: Narayana Health

Services
- Standards: NABH
- Emergency department: 24x7

Links
- Website: narayanahealth.org

Rabindranath Tagore International Institute of Cardiac Sciences (RTIICS), also known as Rabindranath Tagore Hospital, in Mukundapur, Kolkata, West Bengal, India, is a multispeciality, tertiary care unit of Narayana Health group. It is a 681-bedded NABH accredited multi-super-speciality quaternary care hospital established in the year 2000. RTIICS has 16 operation theatres. RTIICS provides services not only to the people of West Bengal and the neighbouring states in Eastern India and Northeastern India.

== History ==
RTIICS is the group's main hospital in Eastern India, with a primary catchment area of Kolkata. The hospital also treats patients from neighbouring districts, North-Eastern states as well as from neighbouring countries and continents such as Bangladesh, Nepal, Bhutan, Africa and Myanmar.

RTIICS, a unit of Asia Heart Foundation, was established in April 2000 by Dr. Devi Prasad Shetty, founder and chairman of Narayana Health. Early in 2016, RTIICS announced the establishment of ‘Stride’, a clinical centre offering multidisciplinary care for vascular diseases and traumas. Apart from vascular surgery, Stride is supported by an endocrinologist, radiologist, physiotherapist, counselor and other specialists.

== Specialization ==
It specialises in cardiology, neurology, neurosurgery, nephrology and urology.

== See also ==
- Narayana Health
