= Narayana Multispeciality Hospital, Jaipur =

Hospital in Jaipur, Rajasthan, India

Narayana Multispeciality Hospital
- Narayana Health
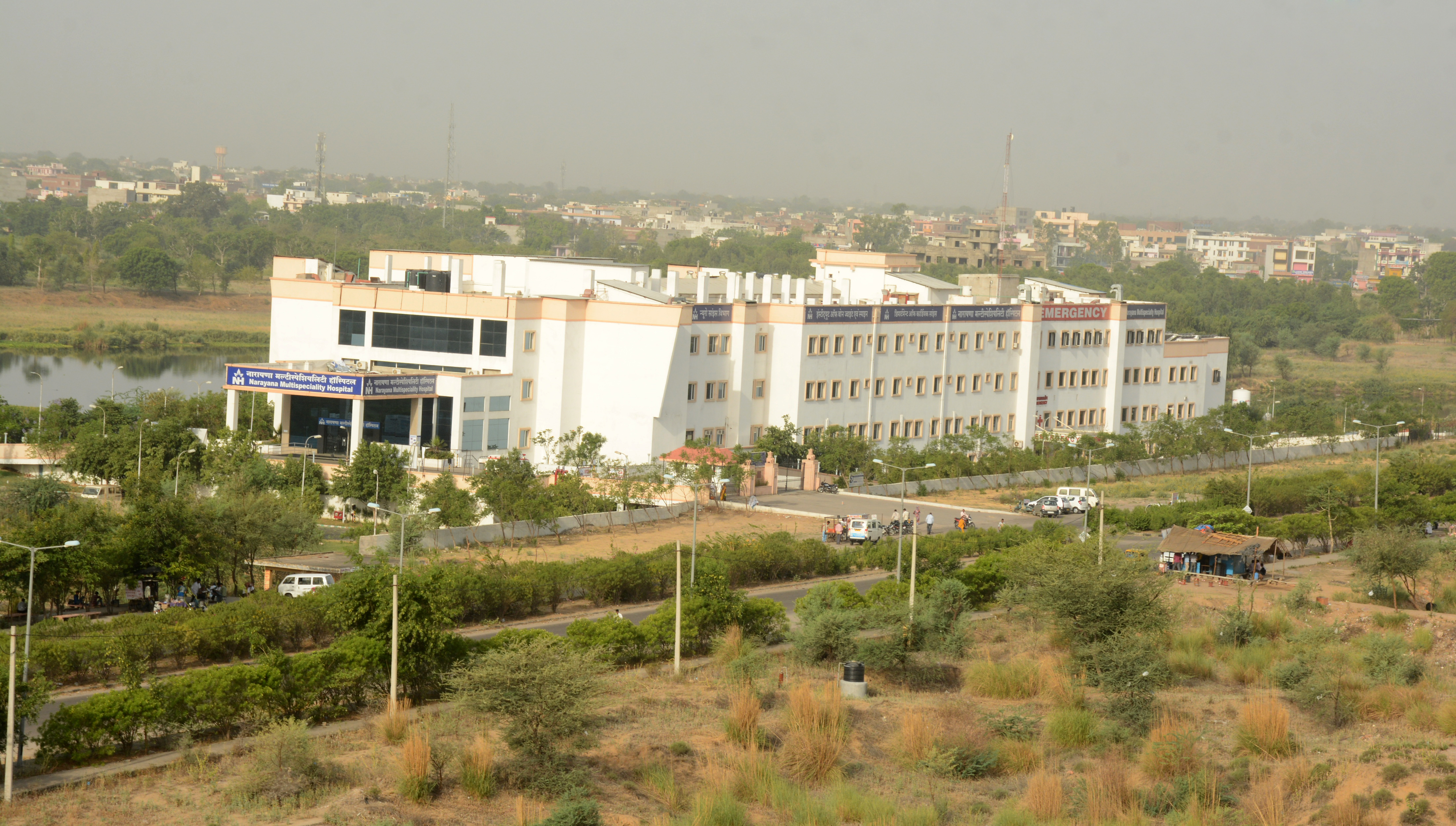

Geography
- Location: Sector 28, Kumbha Marg, Pratap Nagar, Sanganer, Jaipur, Rajasthan, India
- Coordinates: 26.795142°N 75.824734°E

Organisation
- Type: Multi speciality
- Network: Narayana Health

Services
- Standards: JCI, NABH
- Emergency department: 24x7

Links
- Website: narayanahealth.org
- Lists: Hospitals in India

Narayana Multispeciality Hospital, Jaipur is a tertiary care hospital of the Narayana Health Group in Jaipur, Rajasthan, India. It treats patients from Rajasthan and other neighbouring states. The hospital is accredited by the Joint Commission (JCI) and is the first hospital in Rajasthan to obtain this accreditation. It was commissioned in 2011 in Sanganer, with cardiology, neurosciences, orthopaedics and nephrology its main specialities.

The hospital provides congenital defect surgery and coronary artery bypass graft surgery, minimally invasive cardiac surgery and vascular surgery for adults and children. Its nephrology department operates a dialysis unit in conjunction with a renal transplant program. Reconstructive urology surgery, laser surgery and prostate treatments are its other specializations.

On 23 March 2022, the Liver Transplant team at Narayana Multispeciality Hospital, Jaipur successfully conducted its first Live Donor Liver Transplant (LDLR), making it amongst the top few multi-organ transplant centers in Northern India. This highly complex procedure lasted for over 12 hours.

== Awards ==
- 2016: "Quality beyond Accreditation" at the international conclave of the Association of Health Care Providers (India) (AHPI) held at Mumbai.
