= V4 Kochi =

Political organisation in Kerala, India

V4 Kochi is a political organisation cum movement based out of Kochi, Kerala. The organization was formed prior to the 2020 Kerala local elections to contest in Kochi Municipal Corporation. The stated objective of the organization was to ensure good governance through curbing corruption and implementing people-centric policies. The chief campaign controller of the movement was Nipun Cherian, an engineering professional. The organisation was composed of people who were previously associated with other independent movements like Aam Aadmi Party in the city. Other prominent leaders who founded the movement were Biju John, Sajan Aziz, Vincent John, Manoj, Shakeer Ali, Rihad P.A., S Venkateshwar, Cicily Jose, Mrs Helen Eapen John Jacob, Sujith CS, Jithin Vincent, Alexander Shaju, Elias John

The party got later renamed as V4 People.

== Electoral politics ==
In the Kerala local elections held in November 2020, the outfit contested in 59 divisions of Kochi Municipal Corporation garnering more than 20,000 votes and getting a 10.2 percent vote share. In three divisions namely Palarivattom, Nasrathu and Ayyappankavu, V4 Kochi came second and in ten divisions, they came to the third spot. In many places, their total number of votes exceeded the victory margin of leading candidates and thereby changed the poll dynamics.

The party fielded three candidates in Ernakulam, Thrikkakara, and Kochi assembly constituencies for the 2021 Kerala Legislative Assembly election registering less than 2% vote share in all the three places.

== Activism ==
The members of V4 Kochi were involved in protests associated with delay in inaugurating the flyover at Vyttila and few members were arrested in connection with skirmish that occurred on 5 January 2021 following unauthorized informal opening of the flyover.

Under the leadership of Nipun cherian, V4 Kochi campaigned for the rights of the people of Chellanam, especially Maruvakkad padashekharam. The localities were affected by flood and had pathetic living conditions due to flood which was caused by unauthorized Aquaculture Mafia holding the padashekharam that was meant for agriculture, without dewatering in the monsoon season. The organization acted politically as well as by means of law and tried to raise the issue before High Court of Kerala. The efforts did not succeed and Nipun Cherian accused the Judge of corruption, which led to a contempt of court case against him, and to his imprisonment for four months as he was not willing to apologize for the allegations he raised against the Judge.

== See also ==
- Twenty20 Kizhakkambalam
- Thiruvananthapuram Vikasana Munnettam
