= Dharamshila Cancer Hospital and Research Centre =

Dharamshila Narayana Superspeciality Hospital
- Narayana Health
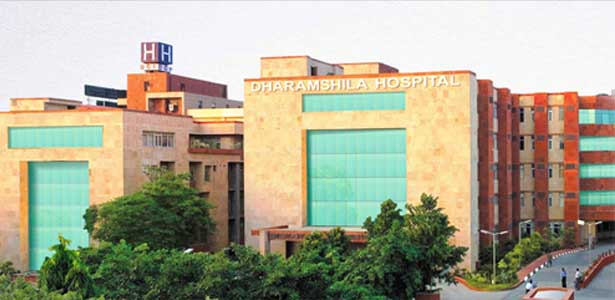
- Front view of hospital

Geography
- Location: Delhi, Uttar Pradesh, India
- Coordinates: 28.602568°N 77.314022°E

Organisation
- Type: Specialist
- Network: Hospital Network

Services
- Emergency department: Yes
- Beds: 350
- Speciality: type=Multispeciality

History
- Opened: 1 July 1994

Links
- Website: www.narayanahealth.org/hospitals/delhi/dharamshila-narayana-superspeciality-hospital
- Lists: Hospitals in India
Research Centre
Dharamshila Narayana Research Center
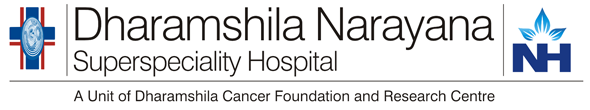
- Formation: 1990
- Type: Non-Government Voluntary Organization
- Purpose: Cancer Care and Treatment, Cancer Research
- Headquarters: Delhi and NCR, India
- Location: North India, India
- President: Dr. Suversha Khanna
- Parent organization: Dharamshila Narayana Superspeciality Hospital
- Website: www.narayanahealth.org/hospitals/delhi/dharamshila-narayana-superspeciality-hospital

Dharamshila Narayana Superspeciality Hospital (DNSH) is managed by Narayana Health, a Pan India Multispeciality Group founded by Dr. Devi Prasad Shetty in the year 2000 with a dream of making high quality healthcare affordable. Dharamshila Narayana Superspeciality Hospital is the first and only cancer hospital of India that has been accredited by NABH. It is also accredited by NABH for its allied specialties and labs.

== History ==
Dharamshila Cancer Foundation and Research Centre was registered as an NGO to start North India's first cancer care and research centre. The first phase of Dharamshila Hospital and Research Centre (DHRC) with 100 beds was commissioned in July 1994. In October, 2007, 250 more beds along with better cancer facilities were commissioned, making DHRC the largest cancer hospital of North India.
