= Narayana Multispeciality Hospital, Mysore =

Hospital in Devanur, Mysore, India

Narayana Multispeciality Hospital
- Narayana Health
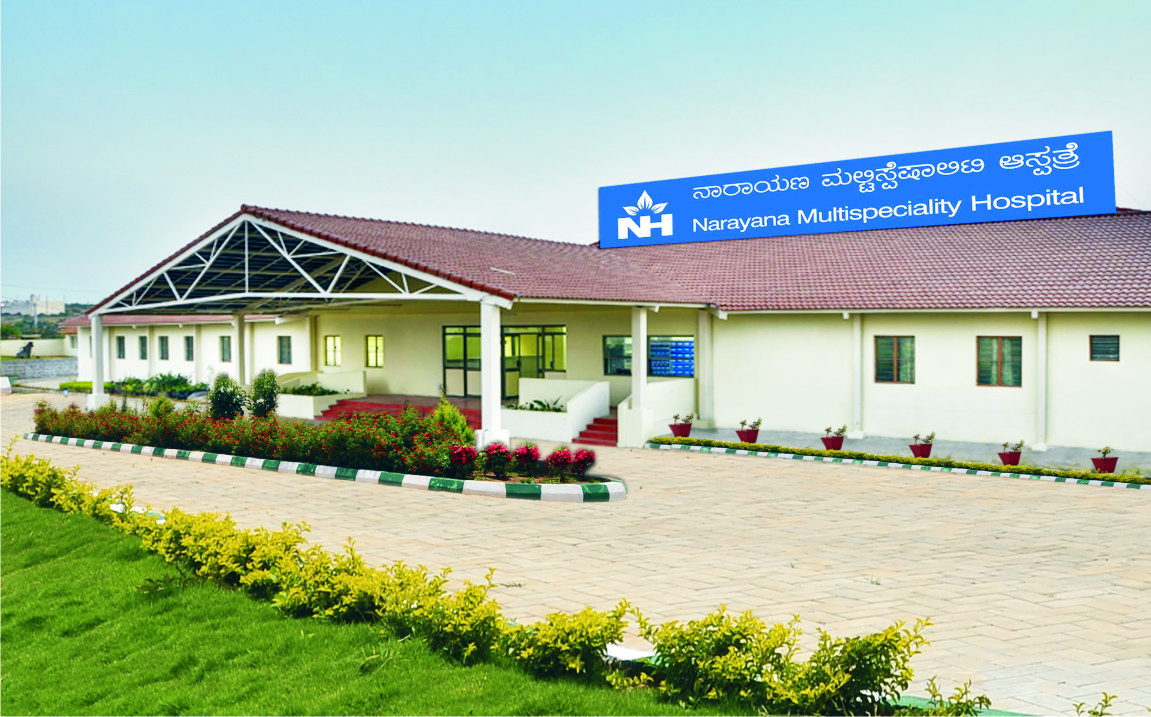

Geography
- Location: Cah/1 3rd Phase Devanur, Mysore, Karnataka, India

Organisation
- Care system: Private
- Type: Multi Speciality
- Network: Narayana Health

Services
- Emergency department: 24x7

Links
- Website: narayanahealth.org

Narayana Multispeciality Hospital, Mysore is a unit of Narayana Health in Devanur, Mysore, India. It currently treats patients from the regions of South Karnataka, including services for cardiology and cardiac surgery, nephrology, urology, neurology and gastroenterology.

The hospital was commissioned in December 2012. In 2015, an oncology wing, the Major S Nanjundiah and Shanta Nanjundiah centre, was inaugurated at Hospital by Nobel Laureate Prof. Muhammad Yunus, Chairman of Yunus Centre and founder of Grameen Bank, Dhaka, Bangladesh. The centre provides early detection, prevention and treatment of cancers including medical, surgical and radiation oncology services., The hospital has organised mobile breast cancer screening camps, a hematology clinic, and surveillance programs for head and neck cancer awareness and screening.

The hospital houses a heart valve clinic, a gastrointestinal cancer screening clinic and a hematology clinic. The hospital provides day surgery programs, free consultations and a shuttle services to transport patients from Mysore to and from the hospital. Auxiliary specialties supported by the hospital include CT scan, MRI scan, a catheterisation lab, endoscopy services, ECG, X-ray, mammography and a dialysis unit.

== Awards ==
The hospital was awarded the ‘Best Hospital Design’ at the 5th Medgate Annual Awards, 2015.
