= Narayana Health =

Indian Chain of Medical facilities

Narayana Health (Narayana Hrudayalaya Limited)

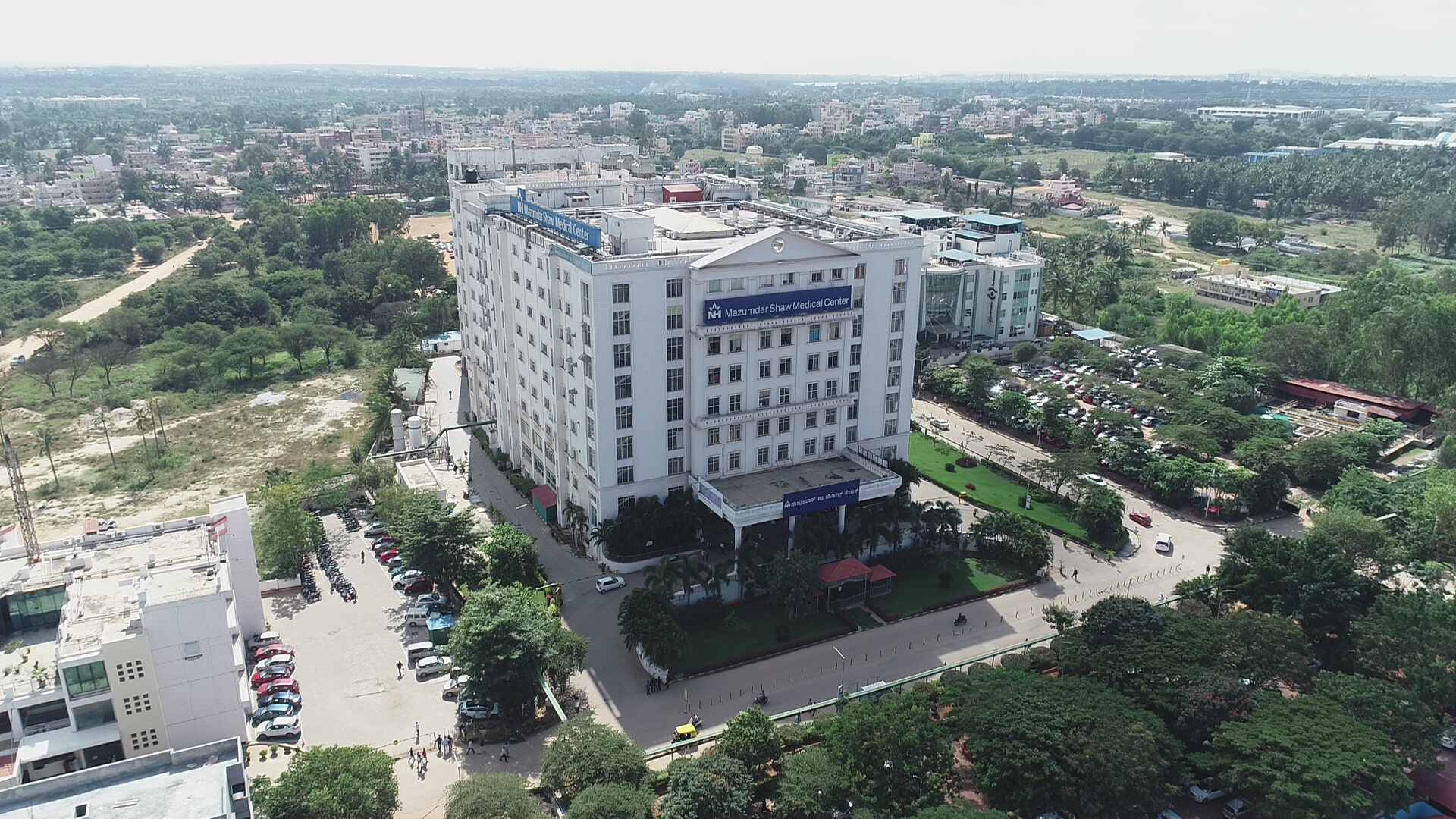
- Mazumdar Shaw Medical Centre, Narayana Health City in Bangalore
- Type: Public
- Traded as: BSE: 539551; NSE: NH
- ISIN: INE410P01011
- Industry: Healthcare
- Founded: 2000; 26 years ago
- Founder: Devi Shetty
- Headquarters: Bangalore, India
- Number of locations: 24 hospitals, 7 heart centres
- Area served: India & Cayman Islands
- Key people: Devi Shetty (Chairman); Emmanuel Rupert (MD & Group CEO); Viren Shetty (Executive Vice Chairman)
- Products: Hospitals, Pharmacy, Diagnostic centres
- Revenue: ▲₹5,483 crore (US$570 million) (2025)
- Operating income: ▲₹1,368 crore (US$140 million) (2025)
- Net income: ▲₹789 crore (US$82 million) (2025)
- Number of employees: 19,214 (2024)
- Website: www.narayanahealth.org
- Footnotes; Financials as of 31 March 2025.

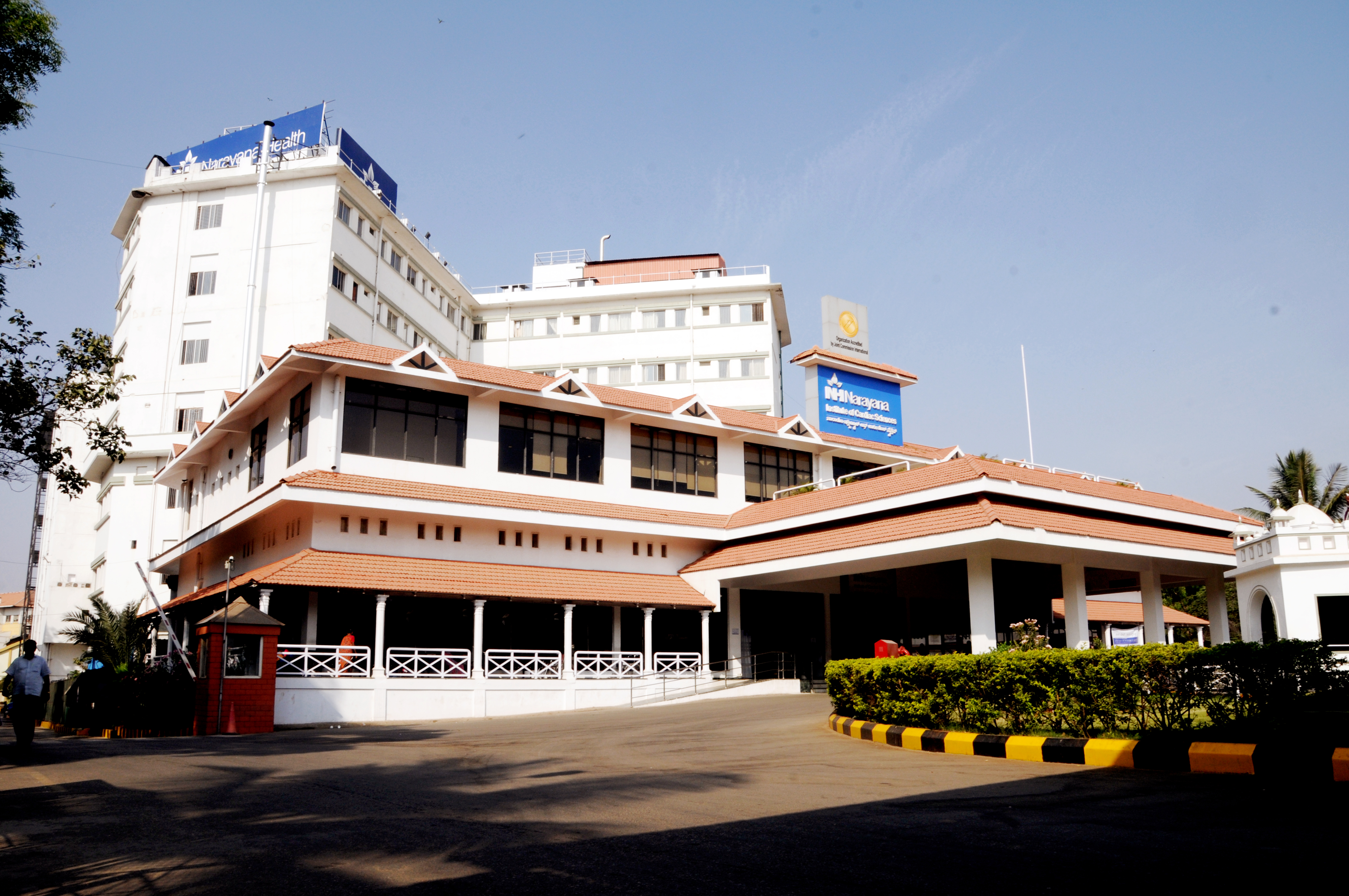
Narayana Institute of Cardiac Sciences, Bangalore, India

Narayana Health (formerly known as Narayana Hrudyalaya) is an Indian for-profit private hospital network headquartered in Bangalore. It was founded by Dr. Devi Shetty in the year 2000.

It operates several hospitals and heart centres across major Indian cities Bangalore, Delhi, Gurugram, Kolkata, Ahmedabad, Raipur, Jaipur, Mumbai, Mysore etc. with an international subsidiary in the Cayman Islands. The facilities offer medical care in over 30 medical specialties and three of its hospitals – Narayana Institute of Cardiac Sciences, Bangalore, and Health City Cayman Islands – are JCI (Joint Commission International) accredited.

== History ==
Devi Prasad Shetty founded Narayana Hrudalaya (NH) in the year 2000 with a 280-bed heart hospital in Bangalore.

In 2013, Narayana Hrudyalaya officially changed its identity to Narayana Health. Since 2014, the group operates Health City Cayman Islands in Grand Caymen. Emmanuel Rupert was made the MD & Group CEO in place of Ashutosh Raghuvansha following the latter's resignation in January 2019. From 2016 onwards, NH has increased its presence in New Delhi, Gurgaon and Mumbai, by opening premium multi specialty hospitals, in order to boost margins. In 2022, NH announced that it is looking to set up a 1000-bed advanced specialty hospital in Kolkata.

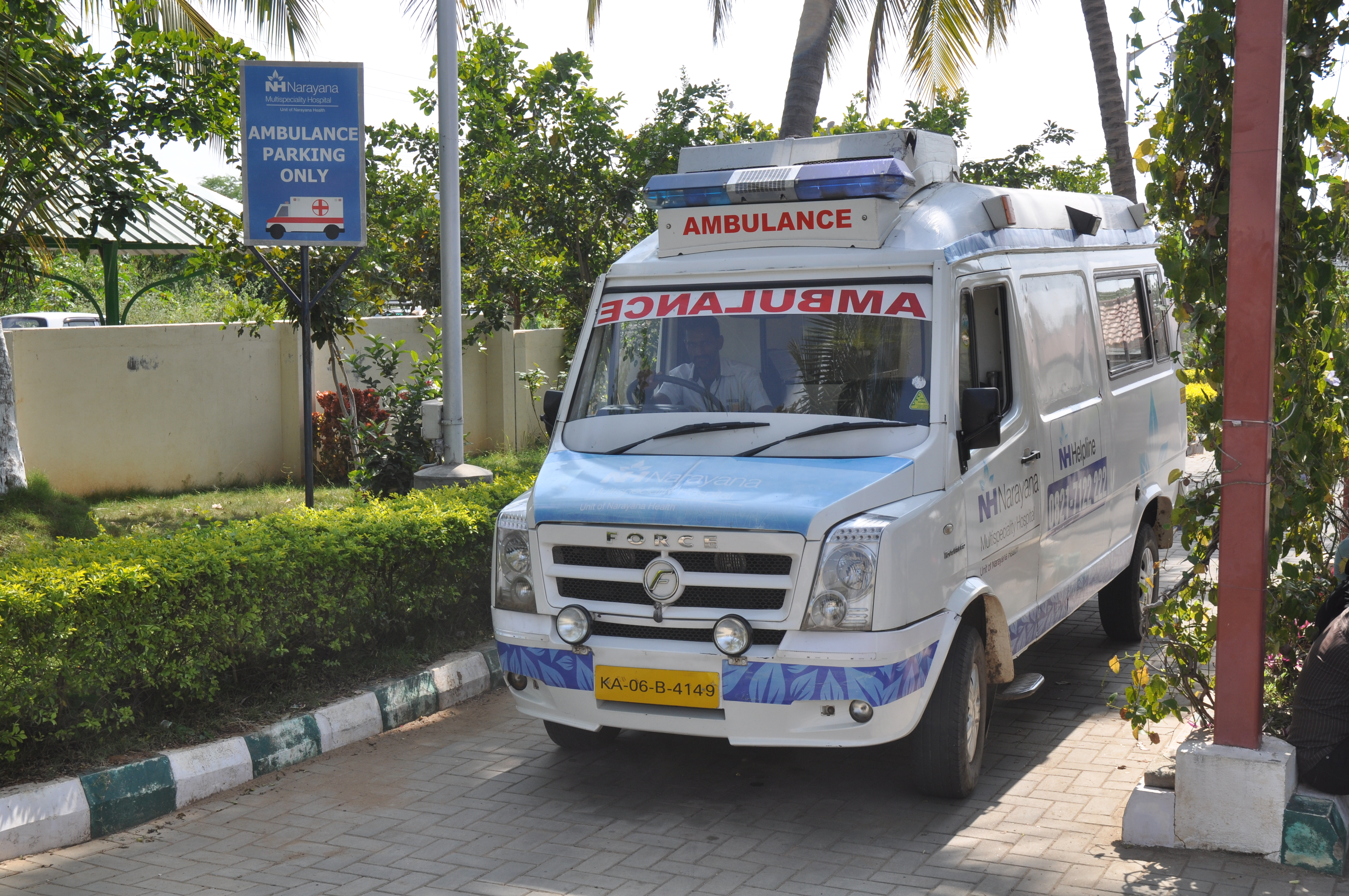
An ambulance used by Narayana Health Hospitals.

== Listing ==
Narayana Hrudyalaya was listed on the BSE and the NSE on 6 January 2016. Upon debut, the company was valued at over US$1 billion.

== Locations ==
=== India ===
No	Hospital / Health Centre	City	State / UT
1	Shri Mata Vaishno Devi Narayana Super Speciality Hospital	Jammu	Jammu & Kashmir
2	Narayana Superspeciality Hospital, Gurgaon	Gurgaon	Haryana
3	Dharamshila Cancer Hospital and Research Centre	Delhi	Delhi
4	Narayana Multispeciality Hospital, Ahmedabad	Ahmedabad	Gujarat
5	Narayana Multispeciality Hospital, Jaipur	Jaipur	Rajasthan
6	SRCC Children's Hospital	Mumbai	Maharashtra
7	Mazumdar Shaw Medical Centre	Bengaluru	Karnataka
8	MS Ramaiah Narayana Heart Centre	Bengaluru	Karnataka
9	Narayana Institute of Cardiac Sciences	Bengaluru	Karnataka
10	Narayana Medical Centre, Langford Town	Bengaluru	Karnataka
11	Narayana Multispeciality Clinic, Jayanagar	Bengaluru	Karnataka
12	Narayana Multispeciality Hospital, HSR Layout	Bengaluru	Karnataka
13	Narayana Multispeciality Hospital, Whitefield	Bengaluru	Karnataka
14	Narayana Multispeciality Hospital, Mysore	Mysore	Karnataka
15	NH Jindal Sanjeevani Multispeciality Hospital	Bellary	Karnataka
16	RL Jalappa Narayana Heart Centre	Kolar	Karnataka
17	Sahyadri Narayana Multispeciality Hospital	Shimoga	Karnataka
18	SDM Narayana Heart Centre	Dharwad	Karnataka
19	SS Narayana Heart Centre	Davangere	Karnataka
20	Malla Reddy Narayana Multispeciality Hospital	Hyderabad	Telangana
21	MMI Narayana Multispeciality Hospital	Raipur	Chhattisgarh
22	Brahmananda Narayana Multispeciality Hospital	Jamshedpur	Jharkhand
23	Narayana Multispeciality Hospital, Barasat	Kolkata	West Bengal
24	Rabindranath Tagore International Institute of Cardiac Sciences	Kolkata	West Bengal
25	Rabindranath Tagore Surgical Centre	Kolkata	West Bengal
26	Narayana Multispeciality Hospital, Howrah	Howrah	West Bengal
27	Narayana Superspeciality Hospital, Howrah	Howrah	West Bengal
28	Narayana Superspeciality Hospital, Guwahati	Guwahati	Assam

=== Cayman Islands ===
No	Hospital / Health Centre	Country
1	Health City Cayman Islands	Cayman Islands

== See also ==
- List of hospitals in India
