= European Society of CardioVascular Surgery =

- Abbreviation: ESCVS
- Formation: 1951
- Founded at: Turin, Italy
- Location: Bologne, Italy
- President: Thierry Folliguet
- Website: Official website

The European Society of CardioVascular Surgery (ESCVS) is a medical society founded in 1951 in Turin, Italy. Its first president was René Leriche, first Congress held in Strasbourg in 1952 and its initial members were made up of 40 physicians representing 11 countries in Europe. It is a chapter of the International Society of Angiology, which later became the International Society for Cardiovascular Surgery.
