= Bharatiya National Janata Dal =

- Abbreviation: BNJD
- President: S.V. Gajera
- Founder: V.M. Gajera
- Headquarters: 701 / A, 7th Floor, Meghmalhar Complex, Sector No.: 11, Gandhinagar-382011, Gujarat, India
- ECI Status: Registered Unrecognized
- Alliance: United Democratic Front (UDF) (Kerala)

Website
- https://bnjd.org

Bharatiya National Janata Dal is a political party in India. It is a splinter group of Janata Dal. It was founded by V.M. Gajera.
