= Health City Cayman Islands =

- Narayana Health; Ascension Health

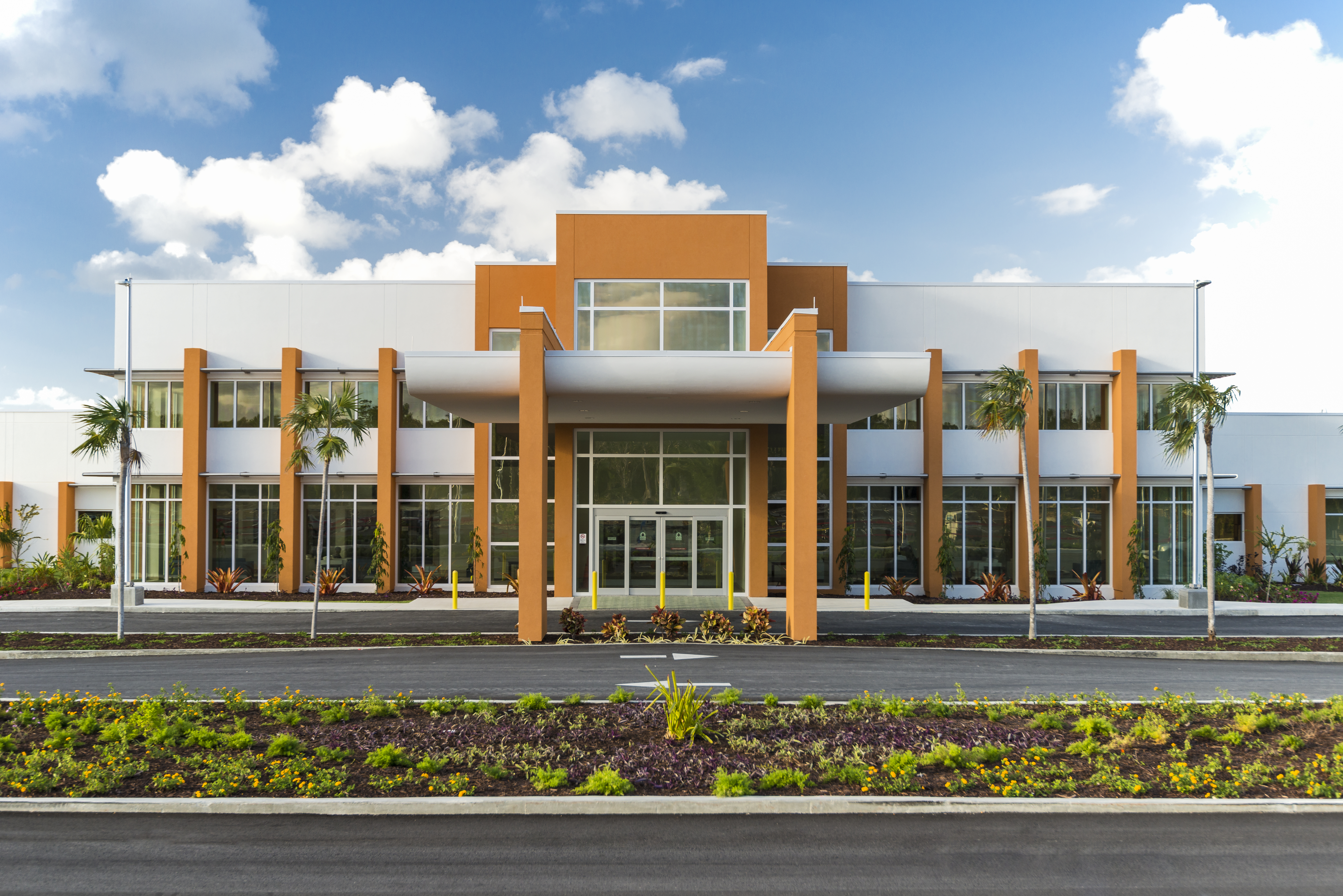

Geography
- Location: 1283 Sea View Road, High Rock, East End, Grand Cayman, Cayman Islands
- Coordinates: 19.298°N 81.146°W

Organisation
- Funding: Private
- Type: General

Services
- Beds: 104

History
- Opened: February 2014

Health City Cayman Islands is a JCI accredited tertiary care hospital in the Cayman Islands, a British Overseas Territory.

== Background ==
Dr. Devi Shetty founded Health City Cayman Islands.

== History ==
The 107,000 square foot facility opened in February 2014.

== Facility and Current Operations ==
The 104-bed tertiary care hospital features a reinforced roof, walls, doors and windows, was built to withstand category 5 hurricanes, and shield all of its critical assets from flooding.

=== Location and Satellite Offices ===
The tertiary care hospital is located on 1283 Sea View Road, near High Rock in the East End District of Grand Cayman.

In 2016, Health City opened a Canadian satellite office located in Hamilton, Ontario.

== Technology ==
According to Robert Pearl, executive director and CEO of the Permanente Medical Group, the largest integrated healthcare system in the U.S., Health City is bringing together the "healthcare service of Bangalore and the technology of Silicon Valley."

== Future Expansion and Additions ==
Plans for expansion and additions to the Health City compound include an academic institution and biotech research facility.
