= G. Vijayaraghavan =

Indian cardiologist (1942–2026)

Govindan Vijayaraghavan
- ജി. വിജയരാഘവൻ
- Born: 18 September 1942; Perumpuzha, Central Division, Kingdom of Travancore, India (now in Kollam district, Kerala, India)
- Died: 20 September 2026 (aged 84)
- Citizenship: Indian
- Education: Cardiologist, teacher, writer
- Alma mater: Government Medical College Thiruvananthapuram
- Years active: 1982–?
- Board member of: KIMS (Vice-Chairman); Aswini Specialty Hospital (Chairman)
- Awards: Padma Shri
- Website: gvr.co.in

Govindan Vijayaraghavan (18 September 1942 – 20 September 2026) was an Indian cardiologist. He established two-dimensional echocardiography laboratory in India. He was the founder and vice-chairman of KIMS Healthcare, Thiruvananthapuram, and served as president of the Society for Continuing Medical Education and Research, Kerala. In 2009, he was awarded the Padma Shri by the Government of India for his contributions to medical sciences.

Vijayaraghavan received Lifetime Achievement Awards from the Indian Academy of Echocardiography, Indian College of Cardiology, and Cardiological Society of India.

== Early life ==
Vijayaraghavan was born in Perumpuzha, Kollam, Travancore, on 18 September 1942, the son of Sahithya Siromany M. K. Govindan, a Sanskrit scholar. He did his early schooling in Trivandrum Model School and graduated in Medicine from Trivandrum Medical College in 1964 and passed MD in General Medicine in 1969. He continued his studies at Christian Medical College, Vellore, obtained his Doctorate in Cardiology (DM) in 1973 and started his career there as associate professor. He moved back to Thiruvananthapuram Medical College in 1976 and continued his research on Endomyocardial Fibrosis, a variety of heart disease commonly found in Kerala, in association with Post-graduate Medical School and Brompton Hospital, London.

== Career ==
Vijayaraghavan's research findings on endomyocardial fibrosis are widely considered to be path-breaking. His research on Cerebra Odollum poisoning (a suicidal plant poison used by poor people of South India) helped to introduce innovative treatment modalities, which are reported to be still in use. In 1983 he was invited to work at the University of California, Los Angeles, and became one of the pioneer research workers in Doppler echocardiography and co-authored the first book on this subject from the USA (1985).

Vijayaraghavan was a well-known teacher in cardiology in India and abroad. His effort in the 1980s in conducting continuing medical education programmes all over India resulted in the establishment of 2-D echocardiography as the most popular cardiology investigation in this country. As Professor and Head of Cardiology, Vijayaraghavan established one of the most modern cardiology departments in this country at the Trivandrum Medical College. With help from the World Health Organization and Government of India he demonstrated that heart attacks and their risk factors are very highly prevalent among the poor people of Kerala. He was the editor-in-chief of the Indian Journal of Clinical Cardiology (IJCC).

He received honorary fellowships from the Royal College of Physicians of Edinburgh, the Royal College of Physicians of London (FRCP London), from the American College of Cardiology, the Premier Golden Heart Fellowship the American Heart Association, the Indian College of Cardiology, and the Indian Academy of Echocardiography, International Medical Sciences Academy and the Cardiological Society of India. He was elected as the chief patron of Indian Association of Clinical Cardiologists during the annual scientific session IACCCON 2010 at Thiruvananthapuram.

Vijayaraghavan was a member of the editorial board of the Indian editions of Circulation and Hypertension and was the Chairman of the Echocardiology Council of the Cardiological Society of India. He was also a University Guide for PhD in Cardiology, Kerala University from 1984.

Vijayaraghavan died on 20 September 2026, at the age of 84.

== Publications ==
Vijayaraghavan published papers, articles and journals in India and abroad and has review articles and abstracts to his credit.

Title	Publisher	Year
Doppler Echocardiography; A Practical Manual	John Wiley & Sons	1985
Doppler Echocardiography; A Practical Manual (Chinese)	Suan J. P.	1987
Hridayam Hridrogam (The Heart and Heart Diseases)	Language Institute of Kerala	1987
Cardiovascular Disease Prevention	Medical College, Trivandrum	1996
Intensive Coronary Care, the Trivandrum Protocol	Medical College, Trivandrum	1997
Hridrogam Keraleeyaril (Heart Diseases in Keralites)	Sankeerthanam Publications, Kerala	2003
