= Kerala Institute of Medical Sciences =

Indian healthcare organization

KIMS Health Care Management Limited
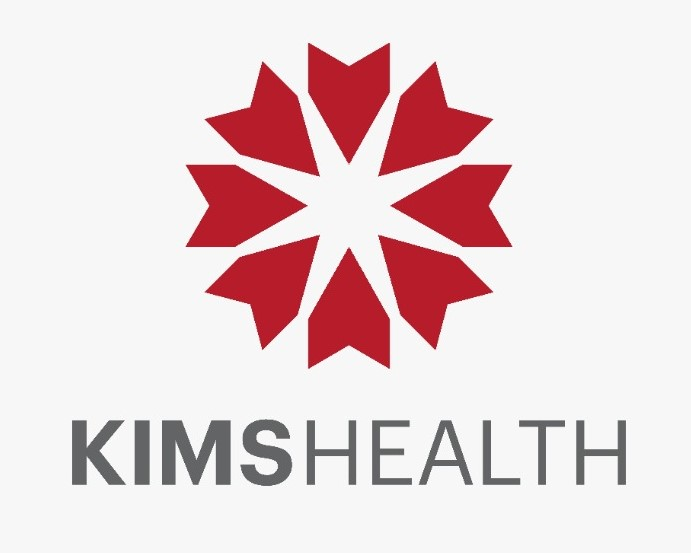
- New logo of KIMSHEALTH
- Founded: January 2002
- Headquarters: Thiruvananthapuram, India
- Key people: Dr. M. I. Sahadulla(Chairman & Managing Director)
- Website: kimshealth.org

The Kerala Institute of Medical Sciences is a healthcare organization headquartered in Thiruvananthapuram with multi-specialty hospitals and health care centres in South India and the Middle East. The KIMS Global started off as KIMS Hospital, a multi-specialty hospital in Thiruvananthapuram, the capital of Kerala. The hospital was launched in 2002 and expanded as the KIMS Global, which went through an expansion in 2013 and obtained centres in other parts of the state: Kollam, Kottayam, Perinthalmanna, and Kochi and well as in the Middle East, in Saudi Arabia, Qatar, Bahrain, Oman, United Arab Emirates, and Dubai.

== In India ==
- KIMS Trivandrum: 650-bed multi-speciality quaternary care hospital with 187 ICU beds.
- KIMS Kottayam: 90 bed hospital with 26 ICU beds
- KIMS Al Shifa, Perinthalmanna: 600 bed tertiary care hospital
- KIMS Wellness Clinic, Thiruvananthapuram: 12 doctors across 8 specialties
- KIMS Bibi Hospital: Gynecologic Oncology (Cancer) hospital in Malakpet, Hyderabad
- KIMS Kollam: 100 bed hospital with 20 ICU beds
- KIMS Cancer Centre, Thiruvananthapuram: Oncology facility operating in the premises of KIMS Trivandrum
- KIMS Wellness Clinic, Kochi: 8 doctors across 8 specialties
- KIMS Nagercoil Kanyakumari District

== In other countries ==
- Royal Bahrain Hospital (RBH): 60 bed multi-specialty hospital with 7 critical care beds
- RBH Medical Centre, Bahrain (RBMC): 7 doctors across 4 specialties (excluding visiting doctors)
- KIMS Bahrain Medical Centre (KBMC): 21 doctors across 12 specialties
- KIMS Qatar Medical Centre, Doha (KQMC): 14 doctors across 11 specialties
- KIMS Oman Hospital, Muscat (KOH): 40 bed hospital with 7 critical care beds
- BRANCH SUNCITYS Co. LTD. Polyclinic: 28 doctors across 12 specialties
- KIMS Jarir Medical Centre, Riyadh (KMCR): 12 doctors across 7 specialties
- KIMS Medical Centre, Dubai (KMCD): 11 doctors across 8 specialties
