= Devi Shetty =

Indian Cardiac surgeon

Devi Prasad Shetty
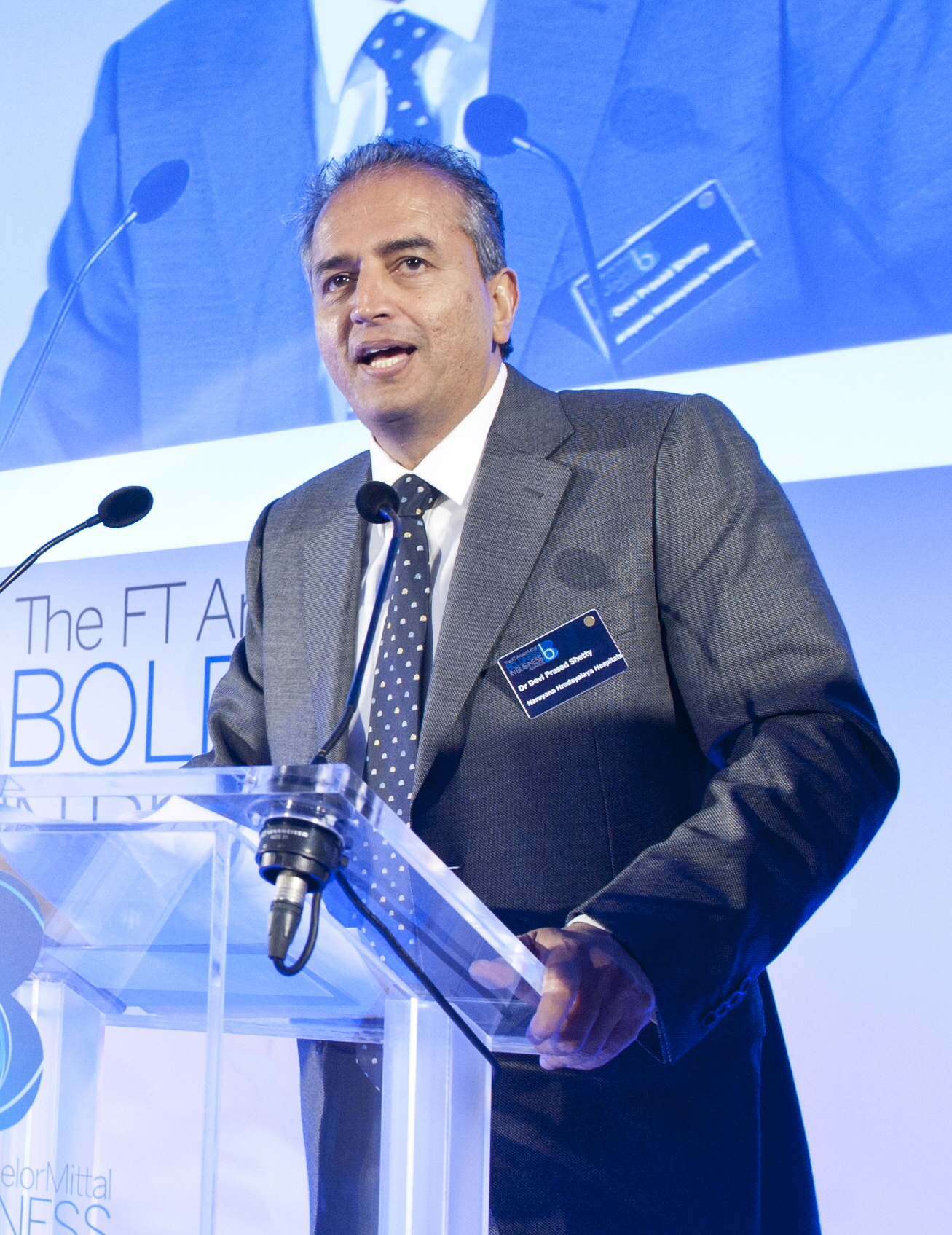
- Born: 8 May 1953 (age 73); Kinnigoli, South Canara district, Madras State, (present-day Karnataka) India
- Education: Kasturba Medical College, Mangalore (MBBS, MS); Royal College of Surgeons of England (FRCS)
- Years active: 1983–present
- Known for: Founder & Chairman, Narayana Health
- Medical career
- Profession: Cardiothoracic surgery
- Institutions: Kasturba Medical College, Mangalore, Guy's Hospital, London; B.M. Birla Heart Research Centre, Kolkata; Manipal Hospital, Bengaluru
- Sub-specialties: Cardiac surgery Thoracic Surgery
- Awards: Padma Bhushan (2012); Schwab Foundation's (2005); Dr. B. C. Roy Award (2003); Rajyotsava award (2002); Karnataka Ratna (2001)

Devi Prasad Shetty (born 8 May 1953) is an Indian cardiac surgeon who is the chairman and founder of Narayana Health, a chain of 24 medical centers in India. He has performed more than 15,000 heart operations. In 2004 he was awarded the Padma Shri, the fourth highest civilian award, followed by the Padma Bhushan in 2012, the third highest civilian award by the Government of India for his contribution to the field of affordable healthcare.

== Early life and education ==
Shetty was born at Kinnigoli, a village in Dakshina Kannada district of Karnataka in a Tulu speaking Bunt family. He was the eighth among nine children of his parents. He decided to become a heart surgeon when he was a school student after hearing about Christiaan Barnard, a South African surgeon who had just performed the world's first heart transplant.

Shetty was educated at St. Aloysius High School in Mangalore. Thereafter, he completed his MBBS in 1979 and postgraduation in General Surgery from Kasturba Medical College, Mangalore. Later, he completed FRCS from Royal College of Surgeons, England. He has also received an advanced cardiothoracic surgery training at Guy's Hospital in London.

== Career ==
He returned to India in 1989 and initially worked at B.M. Birla Hospital in Kolkata. He successfully performed the first neonatal heart surgery in the country in 1992, on a 21-day-old baby Ronnie. In Kolkata he operated on Mother Teresa after she had a heart attack, and subsequently served as her personal physician. In 2001, Shetty founded Narayana Hrudayalaya (NH), a multi-specialty hospital in Bommasandra on the outskirts of Bangalore. He believes that the cost of healthcare can be reduced by 50 percent in the next 5–10 years if hospitals adopt the idea of economies of scale.

In August 2012 Shetty announced an agreement with TriMedx, a subsidiary of Ascension Health, to create a joint venture for a chain of hospitals. In the past Narayana Hrudayalaya has collaborated with Ascension Health to set up a health care city in the Cayman Islands, planned to eventually have 2,000 beds.

Shetty also founded Rabindranath Tagore International Institute of Cardiac Sciences (RTIICS) in Kolkata, and signed a memorandum of understanding with the Karnataka Government to build 5,000-bed specialty hospital near Bangalore International Airport. His company signed a MOU with the Government of Gujarat, to set up a 5,000-bed hospital at Ahmedabad.

== Low cost health care ==
Shetty aims for his hospitals to use economies of scale, to allow them to complete heart surgeries at a lower cost than in the United States. In 2009 The Wall Street Journal newspaper described him as "the Henry Ford of heart surgery". Six additional hospitals were subsequently planned on the Narayana Hrudayalaya model at several cities in India, with plans to expand to 30,000 beds with hospitals in India, Africa and other countries in Asia. Shetty aims to trim costs with such measures as buying cheaper scrubs and using cross ventilation instead of air conditioning. That has cut the price of coronary bypass surgery to 95,000 rupees ($1,583), half of what it was 20 years ago. In 2013 he aimed to get the price down to $800 within a decade. The same procedure costs $106,385 at Ohio's Cleveland Clinic. He has also eliminated many pre-ops testing and innovated in patient care such as "drafting and training patients' family members to administer after-surgical care". Surgeons in his hospitals perform 30 to 35 surgeries a day compared to one or two in a US hospital. His hospitals also provide substantial free care especially for poor children. Whereas urban India calls him "Henry Ford" for his assembly line approach to heart surgeries, rural Indians calls him "Bypasswale Baba" as attested by thousands of sources such as the Deccan Herald, the English newspaper with the largest circulation in Karnataka, Shetty's home state. This is because, like a saint (or Rishi in Indian mythology), anybody who comes to Devi Shetty's Ashram/hospital gets a bypass if he or she dreams of it.

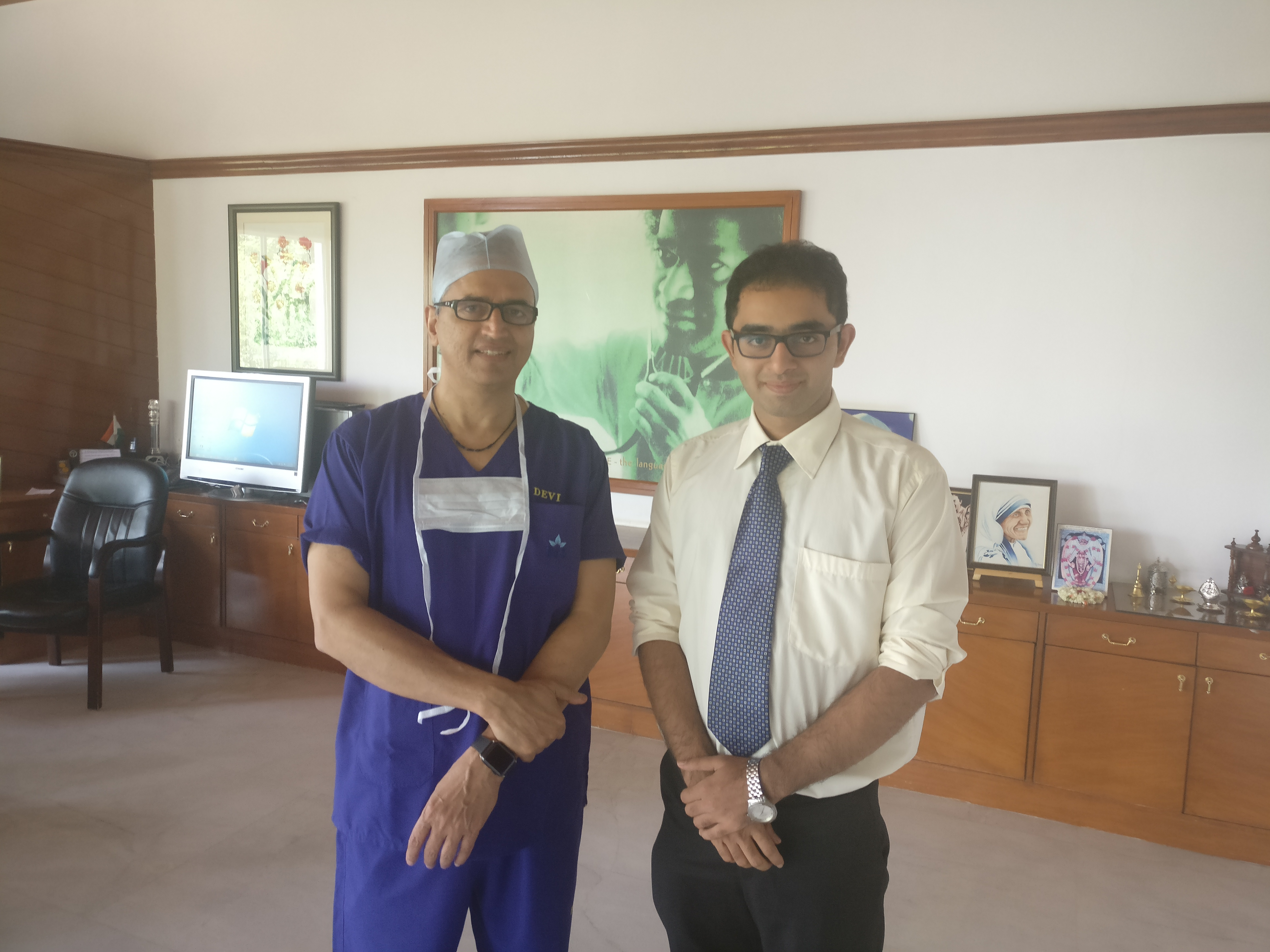
Dr. Devi Shetty, Founder, Narayana Hrudalaya with Dr. Edmond Fernandes, Founder, CHD Group

Shetty and his family have a 75 percent stake in Narayana Hrudayalaya which he plans to preserve. Shetty has also pioneered low-cost diagnostic services. He was appointed as chairman of the COVID-19 task force in Karnataka which was criticized by global health doctors as being a cardiac surgeon, he did not have the epidemiological approach to COVID-19 management.

== Yeshasvini ==
Yeshasvini is a low-cost health insurance scheme, designed by Shetty and the Government of Karnataka for the poor farmers of the state, with 4 million people currently covered.

== Awards and recognition ==
- Padma Bhushan Award for Medicine, in 2012
- Karnataka Ratna Award, in 2001
- Entrepreneur of the Year at ET awards, in 2012
- 2011 The Economist Innovation Award in Business Process
- Honorary degree, University of Minnesota, in 2011
- Honorary degree, 'Honoris Causa' Degree of 'Doctor of Science' by Indian Institute of Technology Madras, in 2014
- Schwab Foundation Award, in 2005
- Padma Shri Award for Medicine, in 2004
- Dr. B C Roy Award, in 2003
- Sir M. Visvesvaraya Memorial Award, in 2003
- Ernst & Young, Entrepreneur Of The Year – Life Sciences, in 2012
- Ernst & Young, Entrepreneur of the Year – Start-up, in 2003
- Rajyotsava Award, in 2002
- Indian Of The Year (Public Sector) by CNN-IBN, in 2012

== Television ==
Shetty stars in the fourth (and last) episode of Netflix's docuseries The Surgeon's Cut, which was released globally on 9 December 2020. The episode follows Shetty's treatment of patients, mostly children and babies, prioritizing low-cost and affordable healthcare while performing with his team more than thirty surgeries a day.

== See also ==
- Narayana Health
