= National Accreditation Board for Hospitals & Healthcare Providers =

Constituent board of Quality Council of India (2005–)

National Accreditation Board for Hospitals & Healthcare Provider

Accreditation Board overview
- Formed: 2005
- Jurisdiction: Government of India
- Headquarters: New Delhi
- Website: nabh.co

National Accreditation Board for Hospitals & Healthcare Providers, abbreviated as NABH, is a constituent board of Quality Council of India (QCI), set up to establish and operate accreditation programme for healthcare organizations. Formed in 2005, it is the principal accreditation for hospitals in India.

== Overview ==
Organisations like the Quality Council of India and its National Accreditation Board for Hospitals & Healthcare Providers have designed an exhaustive healthcare standard for hospitals and healthcare providers. Hospitals are assessed on over 600 parameters, the standards are divided between patient-centred standards and operational standards. To comply with these standard elements, the hospital will need to have a process-driven approach in all aspects of hospital activities – from registration, admission, pre-surgery, peri-surgery and post-surgery protocols, and discharge from the hospital to follow-up with the hospital after discharge. Not only the clinical aspects but the governance aspects are to process driven based on clear and transparent policies and protocols. NABH aims to streamline the entire operations of a hospital. NABH is led by its Chairman, Mr. Rizwan Koita and CEO, Dr. Atul Mohan Kochhar.

Its standards have been accredited by ISQUA, the apex body accrediting the accreditors. Therefore, making NABH accreditation for a hospital at par with the world's leading hospital accreditation body.

The official website of QCI should be referred for the application and implementation of healthcare standards. The Quality Council of India works under the guidance of Ministry of Commerce.

NABH performs three main functions:

1. Accreditation:
  1. Hospitals
  2. SHCO
  3. Blood Centres
  4. MIS
  5. Dental Healthcare Service Providers
  6. Allopathic Clinics
  7. AYUSH Hospitals
  8. Panchkarma Clinics
  9. Clinical Trials (Ethics Committees)
  10. Eye Care Organisation
2. Certification:
  1. Entry Level Hospitals
  2. Entry Level SHCO
  3. Entry Level AYUSH Centre
  4. Entry Level AYUSH Hospital
  5. Nursing Excellence
  6. Medical Laboratory Programme
  7. Emergency Department in Hospitals
  8. Digital Health for hospitals
  9. Digitial Health for HIS/EMR products
3. Empanelment:
  1. CGHS Empanelment
  2. ESI Empanelment
  3. Medical Value Travel Facilitator

== History ==
Established in 1996 through a Cabinet decision of the Government of India (GoI) – QCI is an autonomous organization under the Department for Promotion of Industry and Internal Trade (DPIIT), Ministry of Commerce and Industry.

It was established as the national body for accreditation and quality promotion in the country. The council was established to provide a credible, reliable mechanism for third-party assessment of products, services, and processes which is accepted and recognized globally.

=== Global Recognition for NABH ===
NABH is an Institutional Member as well as a board member of the International Society for Quality in Health Care (lSQua) and on the board of the Asian Society for Quality in Healthcare (ASQua).

=== System of NABH Accreditation ===
NABH accreditation system was established in 2006, as a constituent of the Quality Council of India (QCI). The first edition of standards was released in 2006 and after that, the standards have been revised every 3 years. Currently the 5th edition of NABH standards, released in August 2020 is in use. The organization has to go for re-assessment after every 2 years. After every re-assessment, the renewal certificate is obtained by the hospital.

=== Facts ===
The first hospital to be accredited by NABH is B M Birla Heart Research Center. To date, 1299 hospitals in India have achieved accreditation by NABH. In public hospitals, Gandhinagar General hospital was the first to get NABH accreditation in 2009.

Standards↵, ↵The NABH standards 4th edition standards are documented in 10 chapters, which are as follows:

1. Access, Assessment, and Continuity of Care
2. Care of Patients (COP)
3. Management of Medication (MOM)
4. Patient Rights and Education (PRE)
5. Hospital Infection Control (HIC)
6. Patient safety and quality improvement (PSQ)
7. Responsibilities of Management (ROM)
8. Facility Management and Safety (FMS)
9. Human Resource Management (HRM)
10. Information Management System (IMS)

=== 5th Edition of NABH Standards ===
NABH keeps updating and upgrading its NABH editions. from time to time. The latest edition is the 5th edition published in 2020. It consists of 10 chapters, 100 standards, and 651 objectives.

== Process of Assessment ==
The idea is, that the entire hospital staff should be ready for all types of disasters, care protocols, and accidents, incidents. The above-mentioned standards have to be implemented in every hospital. Especially those who wish to apply for NABH accreditation. NABH lays down the pre-assessment guidelines and processes for the hospital, they have to comply with these.

== Audit ==
The assessments, evaluations, and processes are mapped by auditors. These auditors are certified and trained for this process and they visit the organization. They also have a list of questionnaires defined with them, under which they ask the questions and accordingly evaluate and assess the staff, documents, listing recording of events.

== Leadership ==
Mr. Rizwan Koita, is the Chairperson of National Accreditation Board for Hospitals & Healthcare providers (NABH) and Dr. Atul Mohan Kochhar is the Chief executive officer of NABH. After the resignation of Dr.Atul Mohan Kochhar, Dr.Parag R Rindani took over the position of Chief Executive Officer.
