= List of schools in Hyderabad, India =

This is a list of schools in Hyderabad, India.

== Preschools ==
- Nasr School Pre Primary, Somajiguda and Jubilee Hills
- Vignan Schools, Hyderabad

== Aided schools ==
- Aliya High School for Boys, Gunfoundry
- All Saints High School, Abids
- Bharatiya Vidya Bhavan Public School, Medak
- Bharatiya Vidya Bhavan's Public School, Jubilee Hills
- DAV Safilguda, Old Safilguda
- Dr. S. Hussain Zaheer Memorial High School
- Hyderabad Public School, Begumpet
- Kendriya Vidyalaya Bolarum, Secunderabad
- Kendriya Vidyalaya Tirumalagiri, Tirumalagiri
- Little Flower High School
- Sacred Heart High School, Tarnaka
- St. Patrick's High School, Secunderabad
- St. Paul's High School, Hyderguda

== Girls' schools ==
- Nasr School - Gachibowli, Hyderabad, Khairtabad, and Somajiguda
- St. Ann's High School, Secunderabad

== Un-aided private schools (CBSE) ==
- Bhavan's Sri RamaKrishna Vidyalaya, Sainikpuri
- Glendale Academy, Sun City
- Pallavi Model School - Alwal, Boduppal, Bowenpally, Gandiput, Saroornagar and Tivoli
- The Premia Academy
- St. Andrews School - Bowenpally, Keesara and Marredpally

== Un-aided ICSE schools ==
- Gitanjali Senior School, Begumpet
- Sri Aurobindo International School - Jangaon and Vidyanagar
- St. George's Grammar School, Abids
- Vidyaranya High School, Saifabad

== IGCSE ==
- CHIREC International
- Solitaire Global Schools - Attapur and Kattedan
- The Walden School
- Walden's Path School, Jubilee Hills

== International Baccalaureate (IB) ==
- Aga Khan Academy
- CHIREC International
- Indus International School, Hyderabad
- International School of Hyderabad, Patancheru
- Oakridge International School, Gachibowli
- Manchester Global School

== Others ==
- Kendriya Vidyalaya No. 1 AFA, Air Force Academy, Dundigal
- Kendriya Vidyalaya No. 2 AFA, Air Force Academy, Dundigal
