= Gachibowli =

Gachibowli Financial District
- neighbourhood
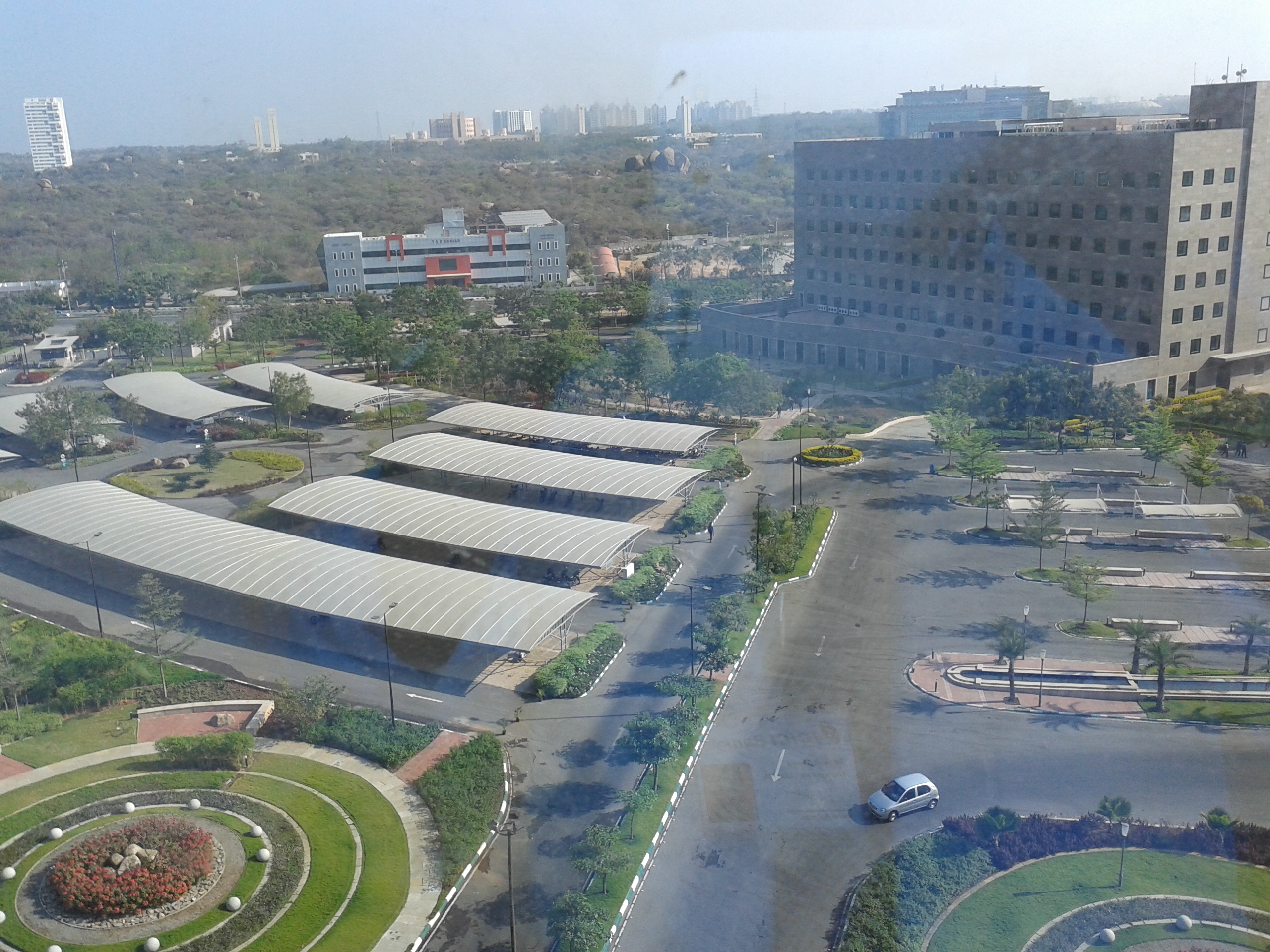
- Skyline of Gachibowli from ICICI Bank Towers
- Nicknames: Gachibowli, Financial District, FD
- Location in Hyderabad, Telangana, India Gachibowli (Telangana) Gachibowli (India)
- Coordinates: 17.4372°N 78.3444°E
- Country: India
- State: Telangana
- District: Ranga Reddy District
- Metro: Hyderabad

Government
  - MLA: Arekapudi Gandhi(TRS)
  - Member of Parliament: Konda Vishweshwar Reddy

Area
  - Total: 27.3 km^{2} (10.5 sq mi)

Population (2020)
  - Total: 149,264
  - Density: 5,470/km^{2} (14,200/sq mi)

Languages
  - Official: Telugu
- Time zone: UTC+5:30 (IST)
- PIN: 500032
- Vehicle registration: TG
- Lok Sabha constituency: Chevella (Lok Sabha constituency)
- Vidhan Sabha constituency: Serilingampally (Vidan Sabha constituency)
- Civic agency: GHMC
- Website: telangana.gov.in

Gachibowli is a neighbourhood in Hyderabad, Telangana, India, located in the Serilingampally mandal of the Ranga Reddy district. It is situated about 5 km away from HITEC City, another IT hub. Gachibowli is home to numerous tech companies and residential units. It has a vast area and is dotted with rocky surface and hillocks all around.

== Etymology ==
The word Gachi means lime mortar and bowli comes from the word bauli which means a stepwell. Thus, the area Gachibowli is named after the presence of a stepwell plastered with limestone. The Asaf Jahi period 200-year-old Gachibowli Stepwell, next to Jama Masjid-e-Dilawarsha Begum, was revived and inaugurated in November 2021.

== Kancha Gachibowli ==
Kancha Gachibowli is a forest area, which is home to diverse flora and fauna, including the Hyderabad Tree Trunk Spider (an endemic species), Indian Roller, Spotted Deer, Snakes, Peacocks and various plant species.

== Gachibowli- ORR Junction ==
There are multi-level flyovers at the Outer Ring Road entrance at the Gachibowli Junction, which are constructed as part of Strategic Road Development Program (SRDP). As per 2022 traffic study conducted by the Greater Hyderabad Municipal Corporation (GHMC), the peak hour traffic at Gachibowli junction stands at 9,806 PCU (Passenger Car Unit)/per hour. By 2036, the same junction is estimated to face a traffic of 17,711 PCU/hour. The four-lane bi-directional flyover from Shilpa Layout to the Outer Ring Road near Gachibowli Junction was inaugurated on 25 November 2022. This 823-metre-long, 16.60-metre-wide flyover has two twin steel girders. Some spans of this flyover are placed across the existing Gachibowli Crossroad Flyover. The 2.81 km-long (1.75 mi) flyover at Shilpa Layout is the second longest four-lane bi-directional flyover in Hyderabad.

The six-lane, two-way flyover meant to link Kondapur to the Outer Ring Road under the Strategic Road Development Plan has been put on hold by the Greater Hyderabad Municipal Corporation (GHMC). The decision has been taken keeping in view the Metro Rail Phase-II expansion.

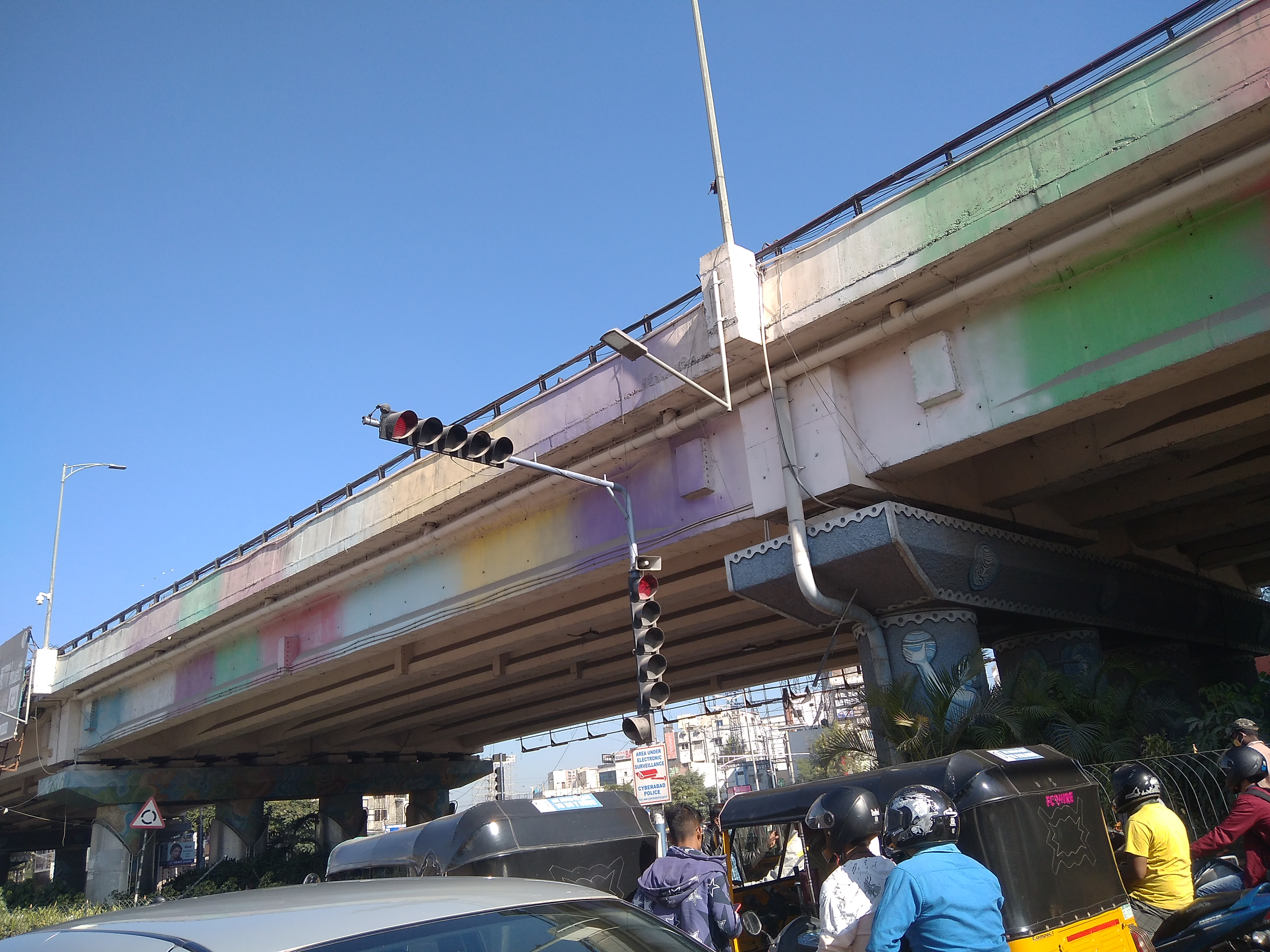
existing Gachibowli Crossroad Flyover

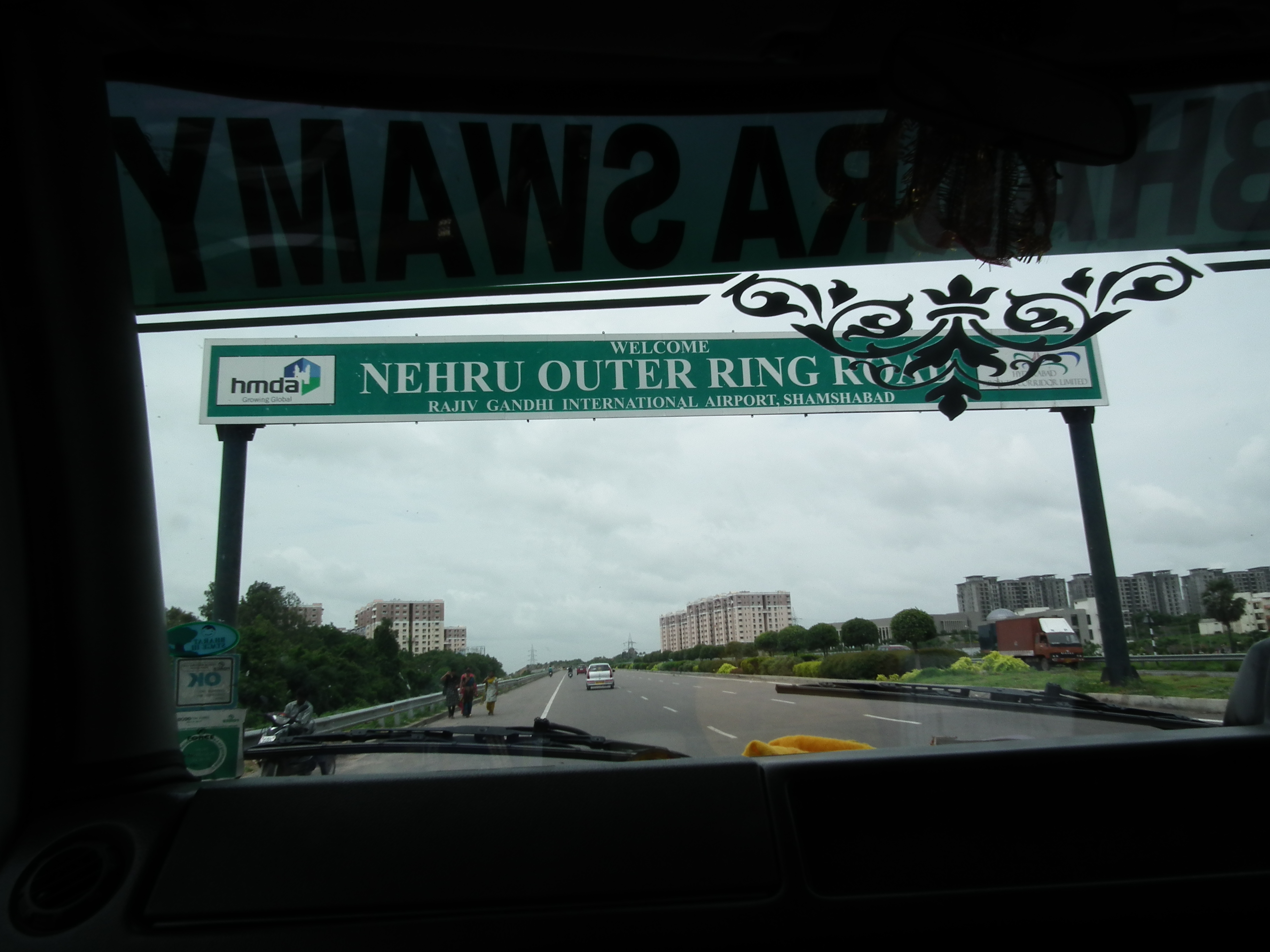
ORR entrance at the Gachibowli Junction in 2012

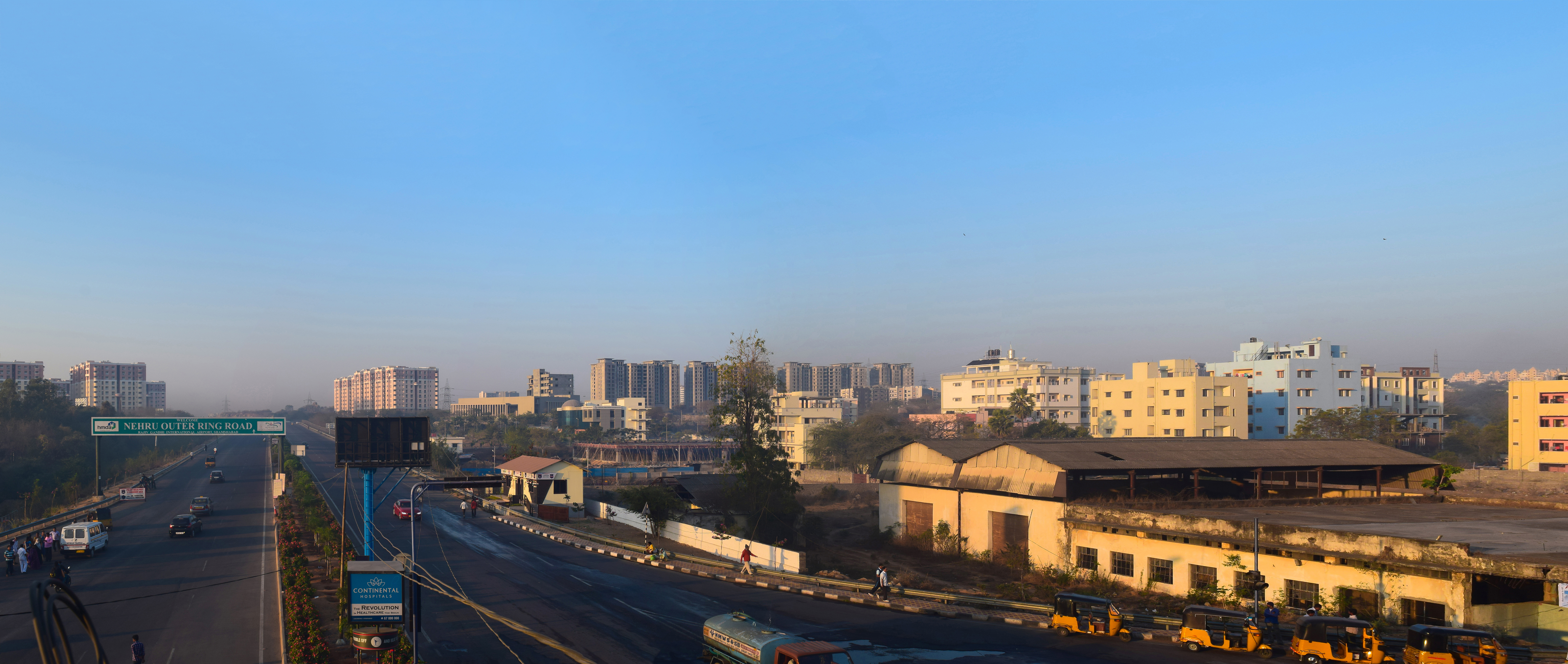
ORR entrance at the Gachibowli Junction in 2015

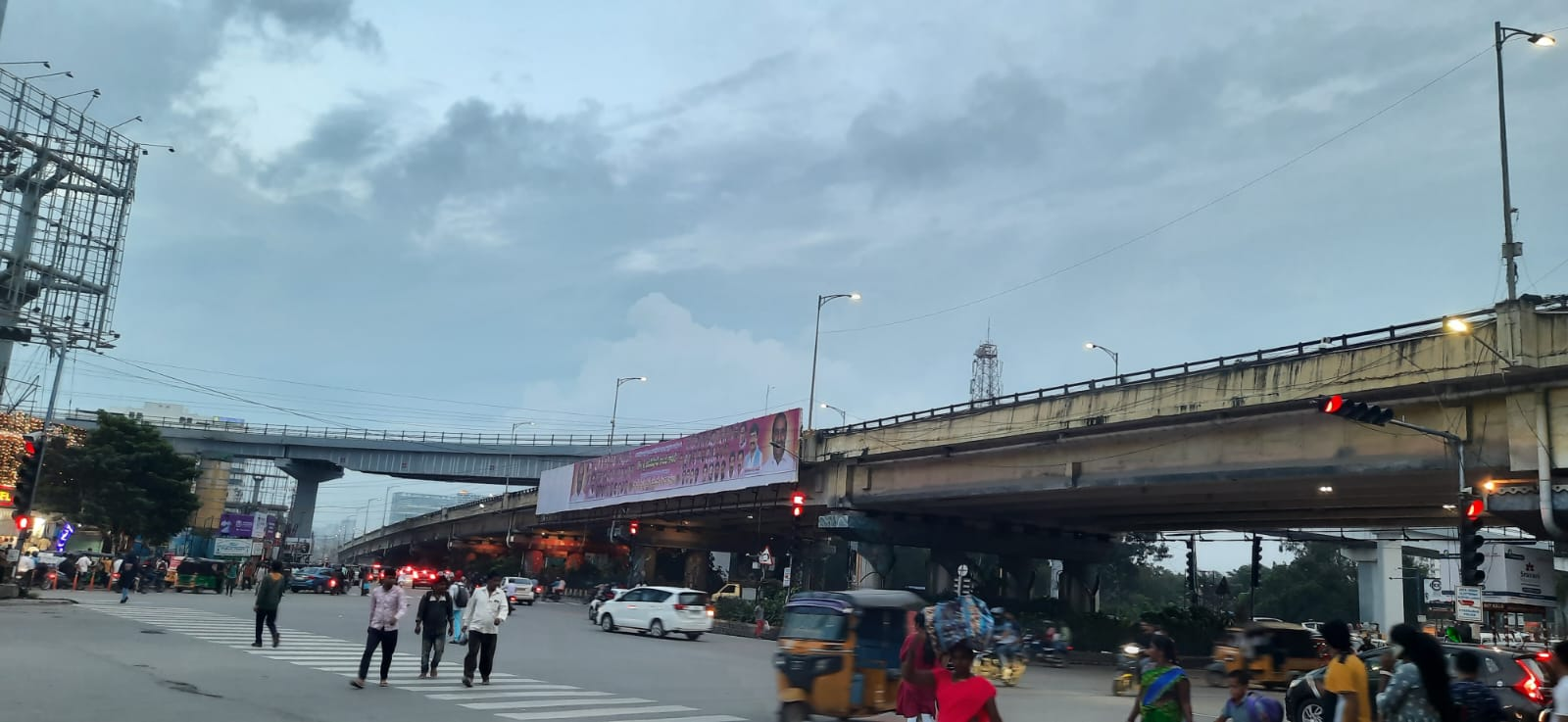
Gachibowli Crossroad Flyover in 2022

== Cityscape ==
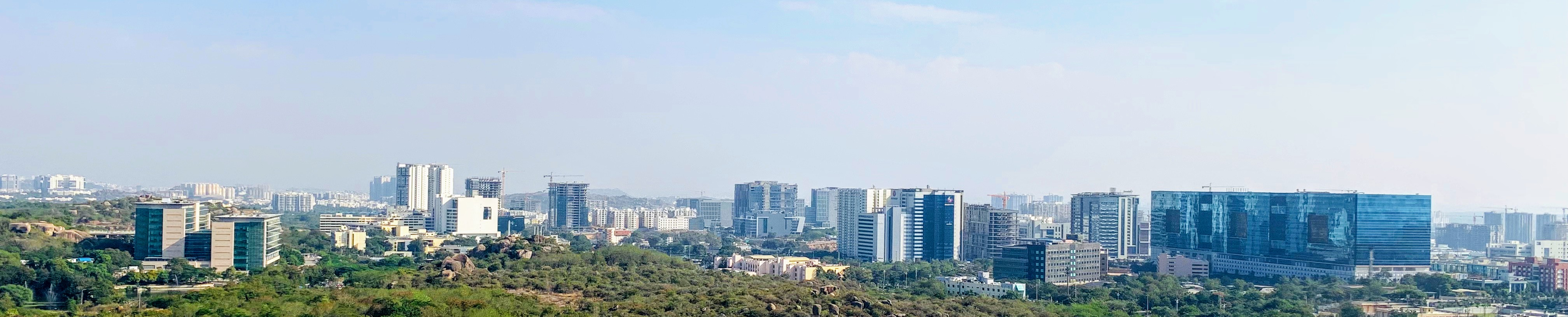
Gachibowli IT & Financial District Skyline View

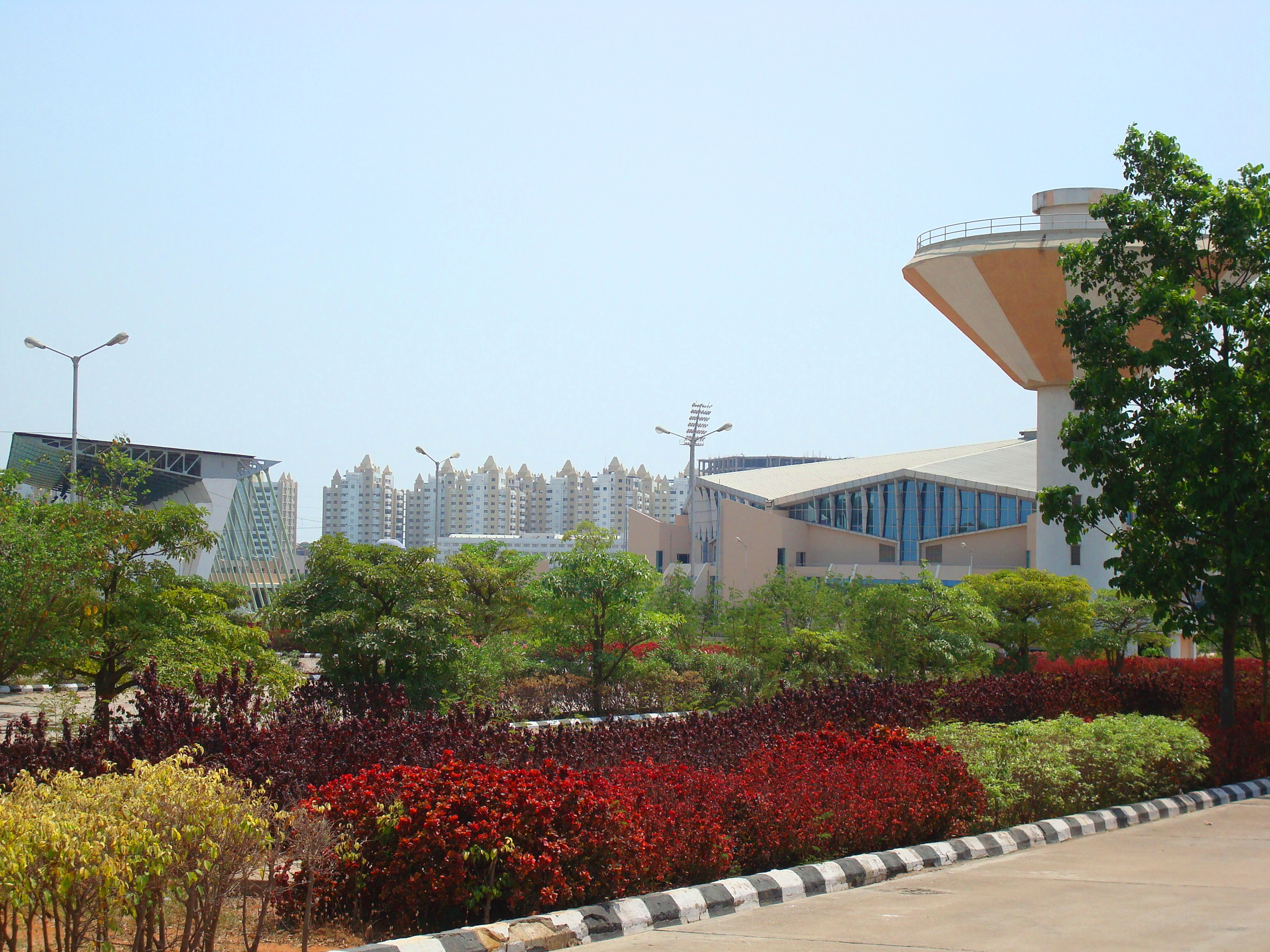
Gachibowli stadiums in the foreground, high rises in the background

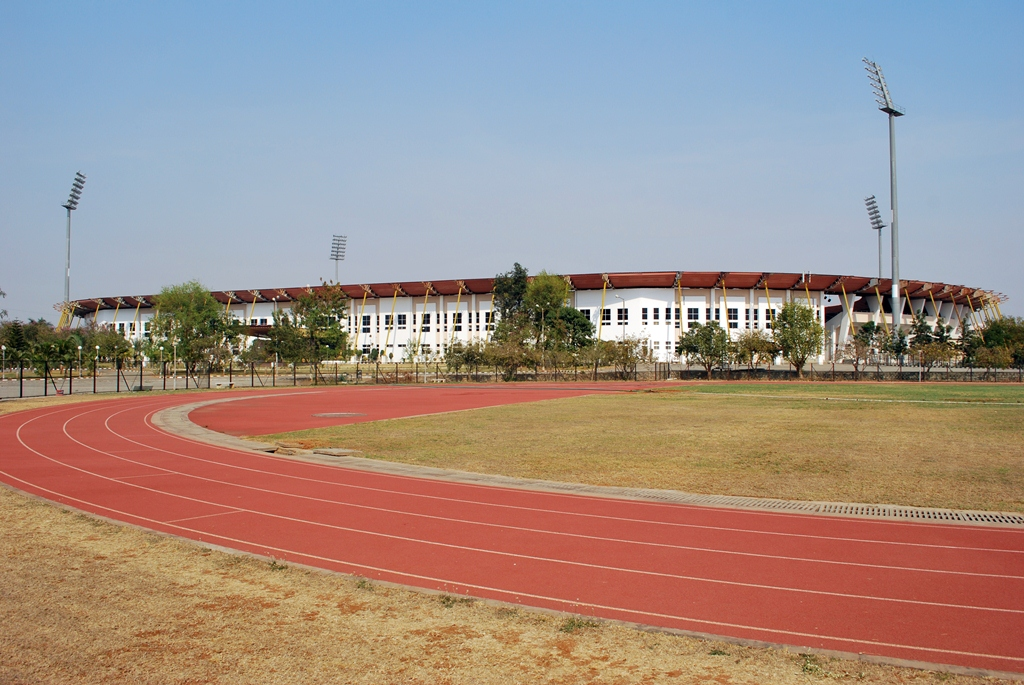
Gachibowli Stadium

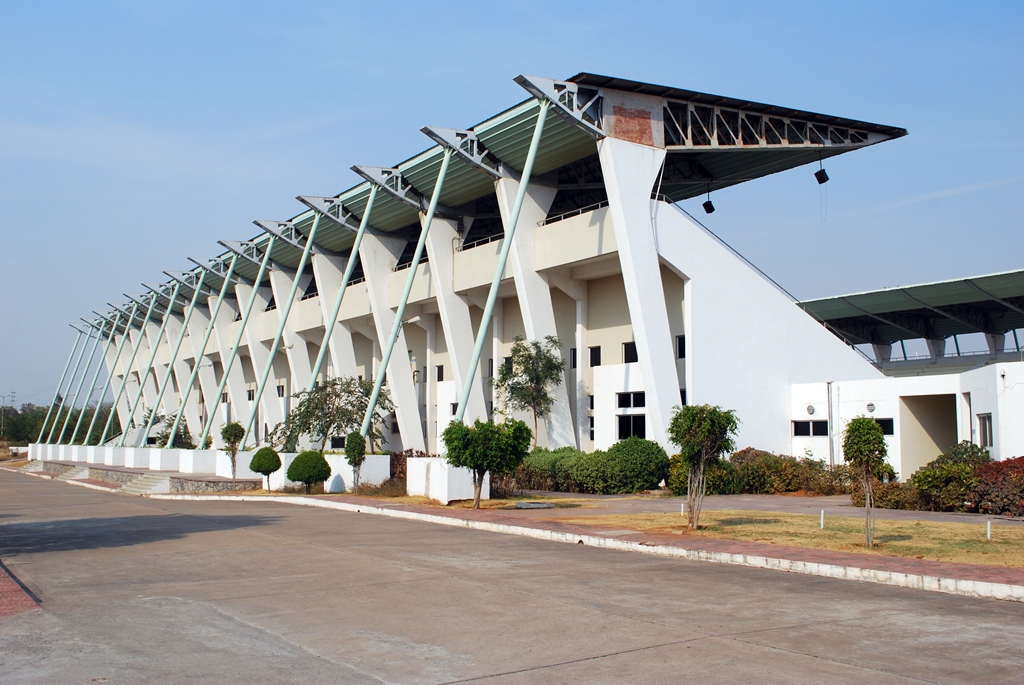
Gachibowli Aquatics Complex

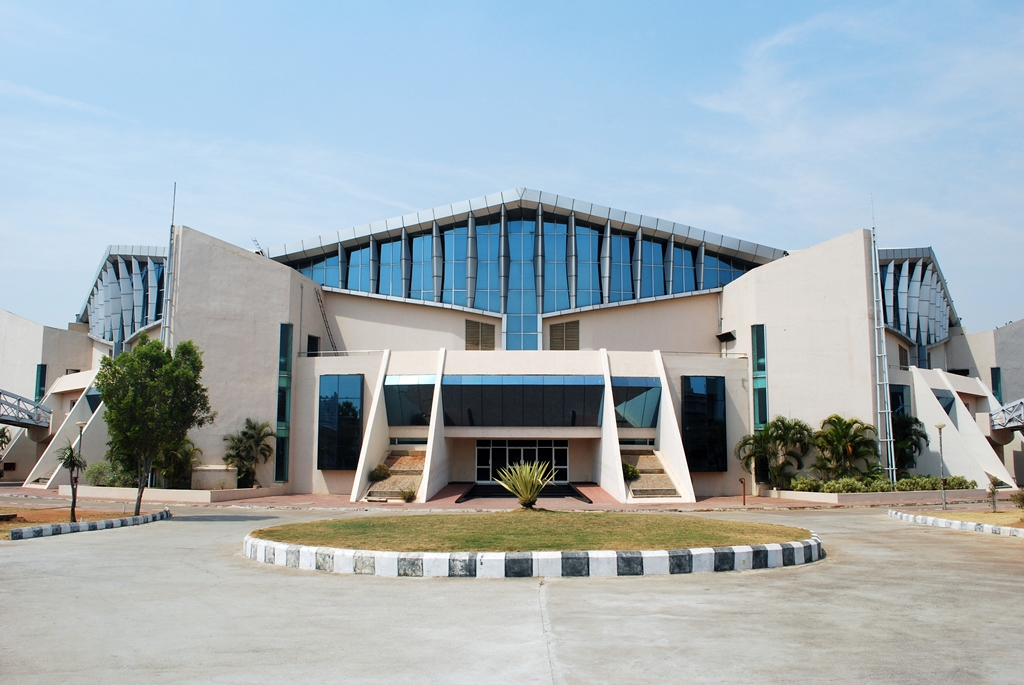
Gachibowli Indoor Stadium

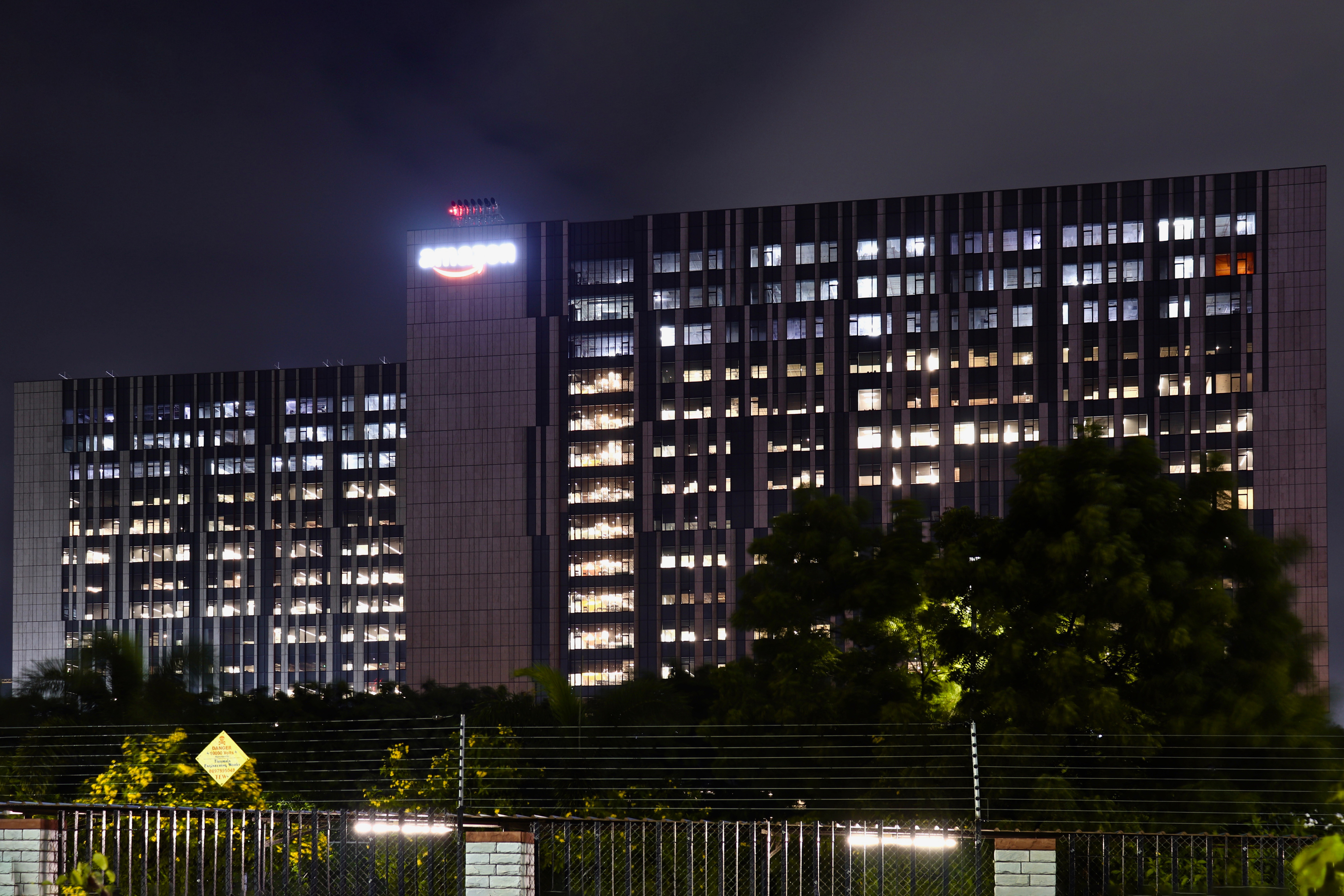
Amazon campus in Financial District

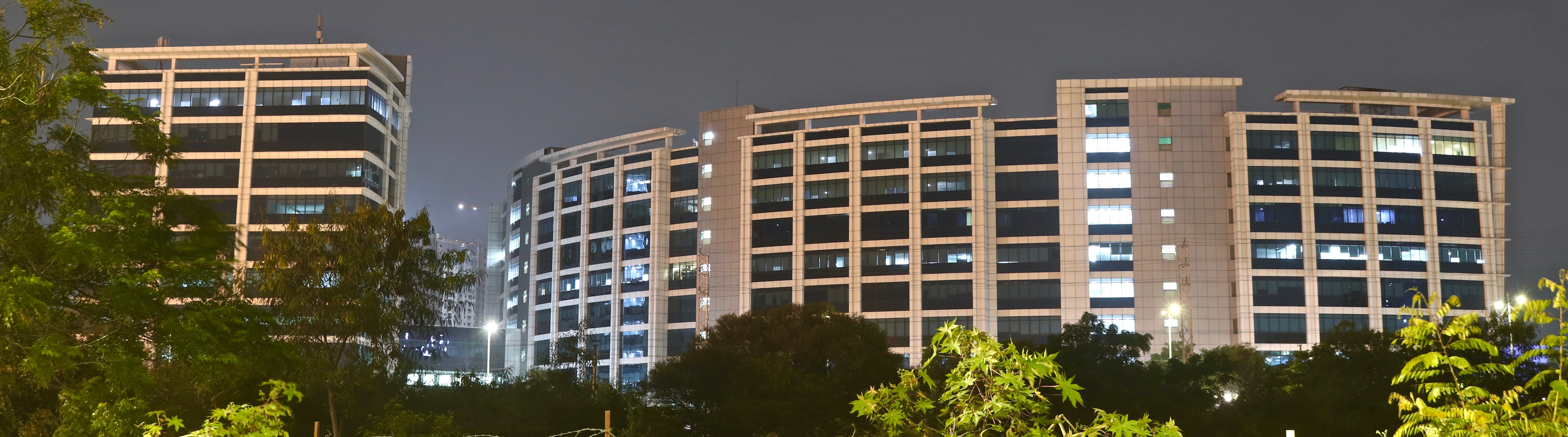
Q-City

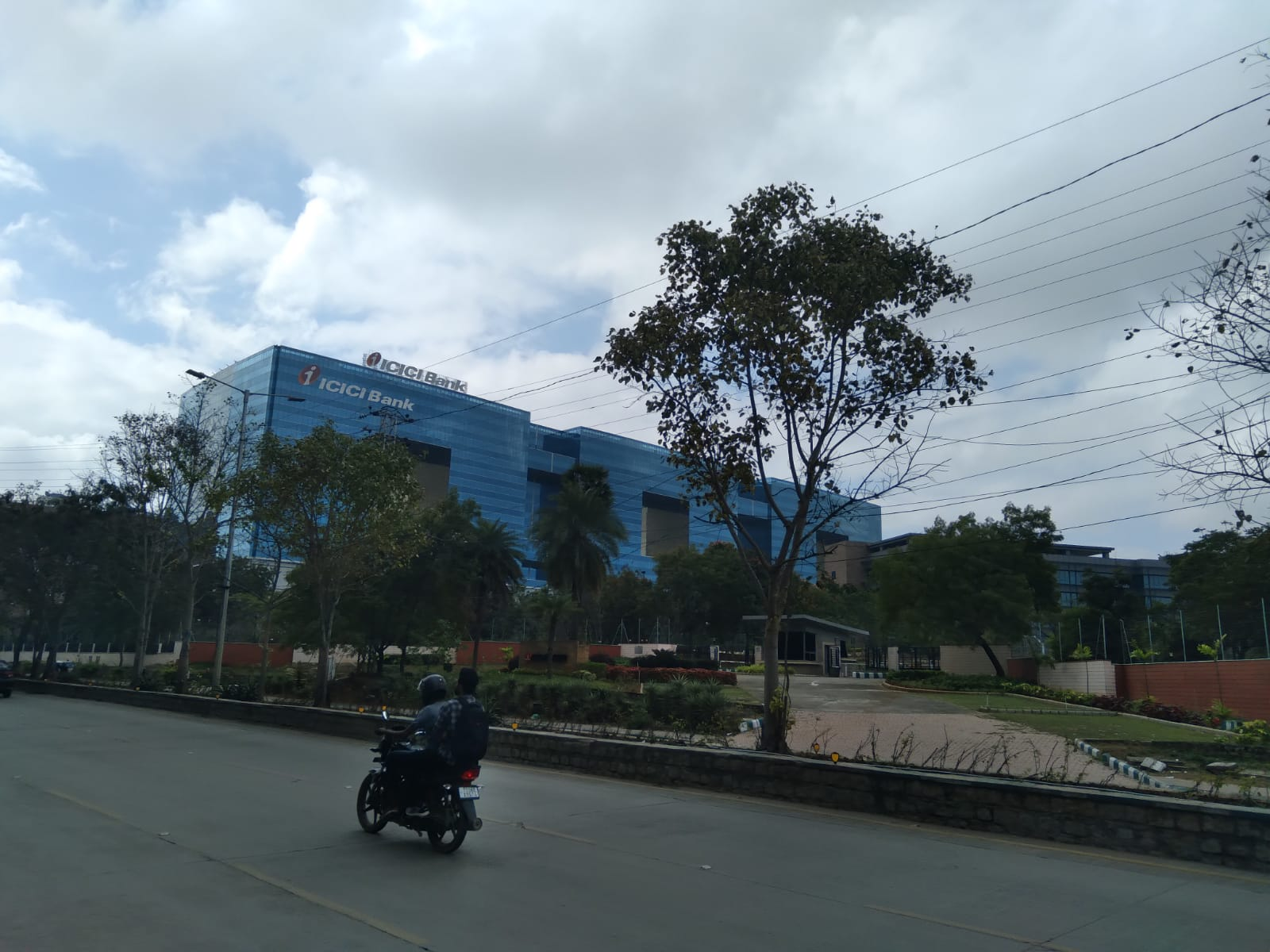
ICICI Bank, Financial District, Hyderabad

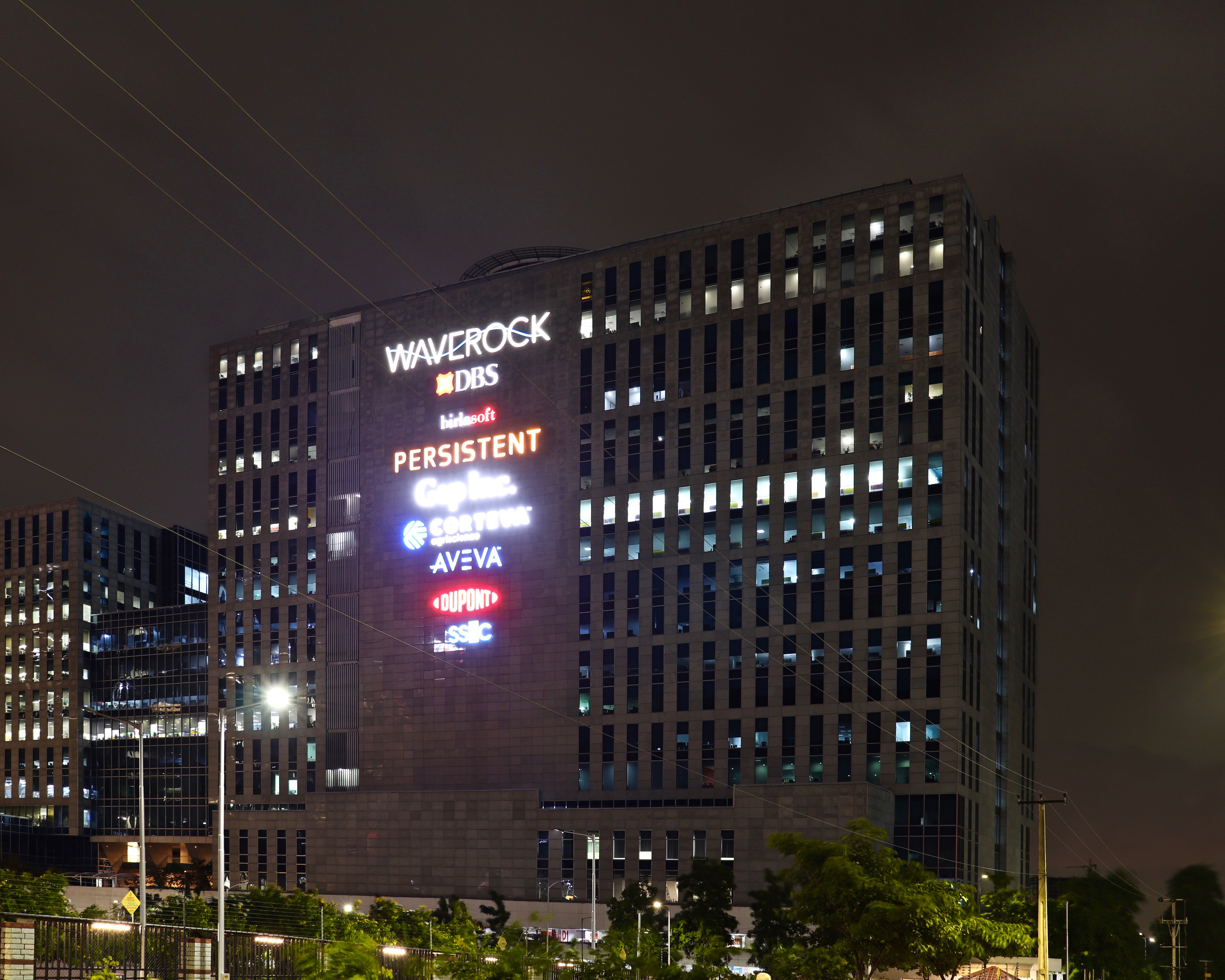
Waverock Buildings

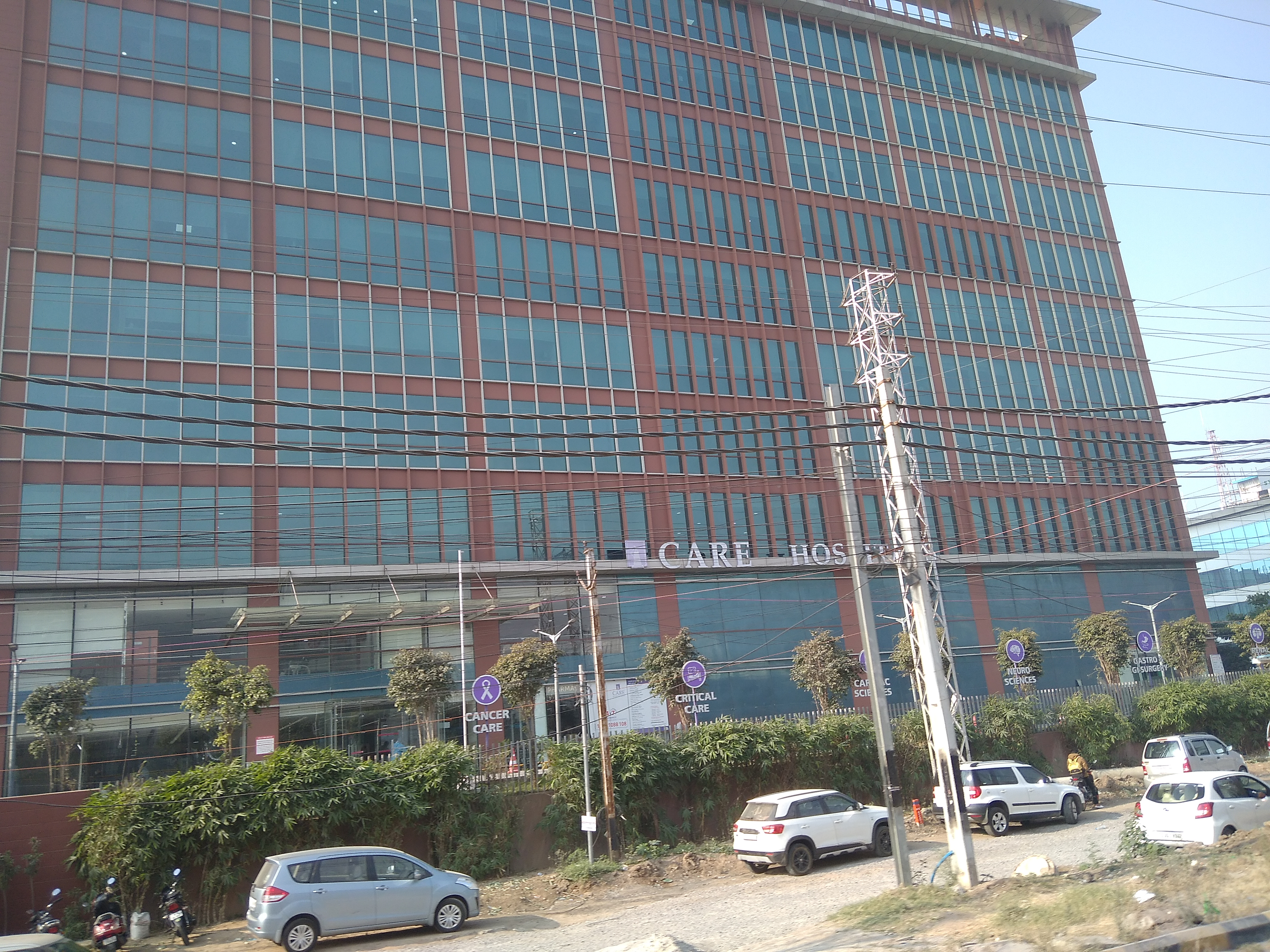
CARE Hospitals, Gachibowli

== Schools and Colleges ==
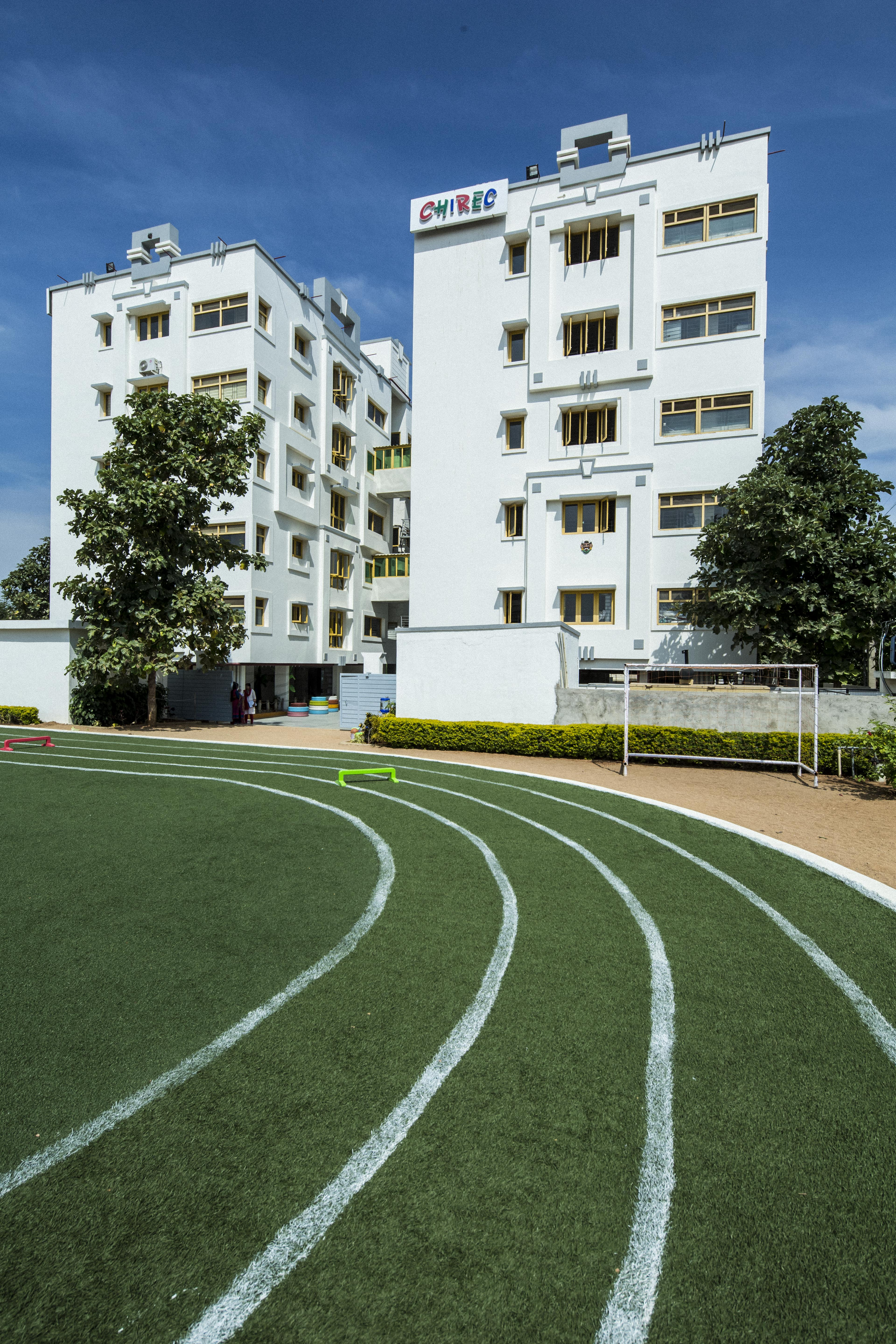
CHIREC International, Gachibowli Branch

One campus of CHIREC International is situated in Gachibowli. The Gachibowli branch, which caters to students from Grades 1 through 3, was inaugurated in 2012. Kendriya Vidyalaya and Nasr Boys School (affiliated to CBSE) are also situated in Gachibowli. University of Hyderabad & Maulana Azad National Urdu University are also located in Gachibowli. There is one off-campus of Tata Institute of Social Sciences, Hyderabad in Roda Mistry College of Social Work and Research Center, Gachibowli. Blue Blocks Pre School and National Institute of Tourism and Hospitality Management is also situated in Gachibowli. India's only IIIT (International Institute of Information Technology) is also located at C.R. Rao Road, Gachibowli.

== See also ==
- Khajaguda
- University of Hyderabad
- List of tallest buildings in Hyderabad
- Financial District, Hyderabad
