= Vidya Dayini Model High School =

Location
- India; 17.33°N 78.49°E

Information
- Type: Private
- Motto: तमसो मा ज्योतिर्गमय (Tamaso mā jyotirgamaya) ("Lead me from darkness to light")
- Established: 1981
- Founder: Smt. Taramati Singh
- School board: Telangana State Board of Secondary Education
- Principal: Manoj Singh
- Faculty: 30–70 teaching staff
- Grades: Nursery to Class 10
- Gender: Co-educational
- Enrolment: Approximately 900–2,000
- Language: English
- Campus type: Urban
- Affiliation: State Board
- Information: 36230601465 (UDISE code)

Vidya Dayini Model High School is a private co-educational day school located in Yadagiri Nagar (New Santoshnagar / Santosh Nagar area), Hyderabad, Telangana, India. Established in 1981, it offers education from Nursery to Class 10 under the Telangana State Board of Secondary Education curriculum, with English as the medium of instruction.

== History ==
The school was established in 1981 with the aim of providing quality education in the Santosh Nagar area of Hyderabad. It forms part of the broader Vidya Dayini group of institutions, which later expanded to include junior colleges, a degree college, and other educational initiatives.

Subsequent expansions of the group included a girls’ junior college (1991), a branch at Pavanpuri Colony (around 1992), boys’ junior college and degree college (1993), and introduction of courses such as BCA. Alumni recollections occasionally mention early leadership figures such as Smt. Taramati Singh and Vice Principal Manoj Singh in connection with the school's development and early introduction of computer education.

== Academics ==
The school follows the integrated state syllabus of the Telangana Board of Secondary Education. It provides education from the pre-primary (Nursery) level through Class 10 (SSC). The medium of instruction is English. Sources describe a focus on academic foundations alongside moral values and overall development.

== Facilities and activities ==
Reported facilities include a science laboratory for practical work, a library, a computer centre (established 1987), classrooms, and sports/playground areas supporting activities such as cricket, basketball, volleyball, table tennis, and badminton.

Co-curricular activities, cultural events, and National Cadet Corps (NCC) participation are also mentioned. Transport facilities are available. Some directory listings note additional infrastructure such as fire safety measures and accessibility features.

== Administration and enrolment ==
It is a private unaided institution. Enrolment figures vary across sources, with some directory and UDISE-linked reports indicating several hundred to around 900–2,000 students depending on the year and data set. Student–teacher ratios reported in secondary sources range roughly from 18:1 to higher figures. The school operates primarily as a day school.

== See also ==
- List of schools in Hyderabad
