= Indus Trust =

Indus Trust is a nonprofit educational trust that focuses on training research and allied activities for underprivileged communities in India.

== Curriculum ==
The schools' curricula are segregated into three main curriculum programmes:

- The International Baccalaureate Primary Years Programme (PYP) for young learners between kindergarten to grade 1
- The International Baccalaureate Middle Years Programme (MYP) for grade 1 to grade 10

== International schools ==
=== Bangalore ===
Indus International School, Bangalore
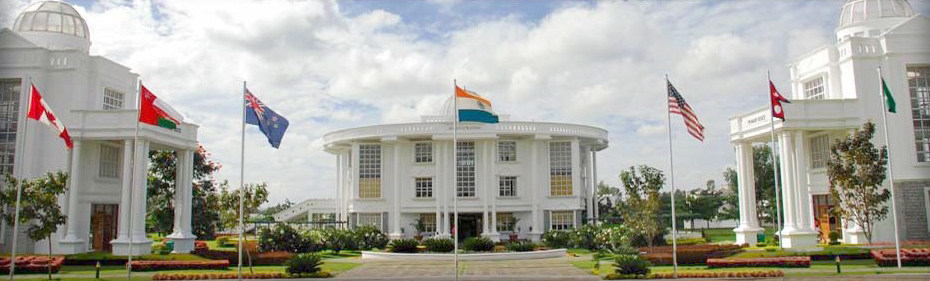
- Billapura Cross, Sarjapur, Bangalore - 562125, Karnataka, India

Information
- Type: Private
- Motto: In Omnia Paratus (Prepared For All Challenges)
- Established: 2001
- Founder: Indus Trust
- Principal: Sarojini Rao
- Faculty: 149
- Grades: K-12
- Enrollment: Over 1200 students from 32 countries
- Campus size: 40 acres (160,000 m^{2})
- Campus type: Day school with boarding facilities
- Affiliation: IB school offering the primary, secondary and higher secondary curricula of the Geneva-based International Baccalaureate Organisation (established 1967)
- Website: bangalore.indusschool.com

The Indus International School, Bangalore (IISB) is an International Baccalaureate (IB) school situated on a 40-acre campus at Sarjapur, Bangalore, India, which was established by the Indus Trust in 2003. The school is run by the Indus Trust.

The school was ranked the best international school in India for eight years in a row (2012–2019) in a survey by C-Fore/Education World. The school motto is the Latin phrase "In Omnia Paratus" ("Prepared for all challenges").

Indian-American technology investor Kumar Malavalli announced funding in 2003.

==== Academic ranking ====
National rankings
School	Rank	Year	Source
Indus Bangalore	1	2014	Education World
Indus Bangalore	1	2013	Education World
Indus Bangalore	1	2012	Education World
Indus Bangalore	2	2011	Education World
Indus Bangalore	3	2010	Education World
Indus Bangalore	4	2009	Education World

==== Tournaments ====
Indus International School, Bangalore hosts the Eagle Cup, a tournament with competitions in football, basketball, swimming, athletics, badminton and tennis.

=== Pune ===
Indus International School, Pune was established in August 2008 at Mulshi, Pune by the Indus Trust. The school currently has over 850 students from 23 countries.

The medium of instruction is English and the curricula offered are the International Baccalaureate (IB) Primary Years Program from Prep to Grade 5; the Middle School Programme from Grade 6 to Grade 10; and the IB Diploma Program for Grades 11 and 12. It previously offered the International General Certificate of Secondary Education for Grades 9 and 10; however, as of 2019, it was replaced with the Middle Years program. The IB diploma class of 2015-16 consists of over 70 people. It offers subjects including English B, Spanish, and math studies. It has an Olympic swimming pool and international standard boarding facilities. The school is known for its horses.

=== Hyderabad ===
Indus International School, Hyderabad
- Near Mokila, Shankarpally, Hyderabad - 501203, Telangana, India

Information
- Type: Private
- Motto: In Omnia Paratus (Prepared For All Challenges)
- Established: 2001
- Founder: Indus Trust
- President: Lt Gen (Retd) Arjun Ray
- Principal: Farida Fraz
- Grades: K-12
- Enrollment: Over 1000+
- Campus size: 27 acres (110,000 m^{2})
- Campus type: Day school with optional boarding facilities
- Affiliation: International Baccalaureate, International General Certificate of Secondary Education
- Website: hyderabad.indusschool.com

The Indus International School, Hyderabad (IISH) Top 10 in all-India ranking is an International Baccalaureate (IB) school situated on a 27-acre campus at Mokila, Shankarpally, Hyderabad, established by the Indus Trust in 2008. The school is run by the Indus Trust, comprising members who represent the IT sector, real estate development and business investment. The school motto is the Latin phrase "In Omnia Paratus" ("Prepared for all challenges").

The Principal of Indus International School, Hyderabad is Nuwaira Pasha.

==== Academic ranking ====
Indus Hyderabad rankings
Rank	Source	Year
7 (Top 10 in India)	Education World	2014
11 (Top 15 in India)	Education World	2013

==== Whole education curriculum ====
In addition to academic subjects, sports, dance, music and art are incorporated into the curriculum. The school offers basketball, football, cricket, tennis, volleyball, swimming, athletics, karate, and horse-riding, among other sports. For students wishing to further their musical talents, the music department offers lessons in guitar, violin, keyboard, flute, drums, and a variety of other music instruments. Students may be elected to join the school orchestra.

==== Leadership Curriculum ====
All students also follow the proprietary Indus Leadership Curriculum, unique in the Indian education industry, alongside their regular curriculum.

==== Parent Advisory Committee ====
Indus International School Hyderabad has a Parental Advisory Committee (PAC) which is made up of Indus Hyderabad parents. The PAC provides an opportunity to Indus parents to share their concerns, providing a communication channel between parents and the management.

==== Admission ====
Admission into Indus International School Hyderabad is based on an all-inclusive policy. Admissions are granted upon review of the past two years' academic records and on the mental organization, creativity and critical thinking skills of the student, which may be based on an evaluation by the school head.

==== Facilities ====
The campus houses Indus International School Hyderabad, boarding facilities for weekly and full-time boarders and the sports grounds.

Classrooms seat 30 students, and blocks are equipped with play areas for pre-school, projection systems, computer facilities and lockers. While students work on their own laptops, the classrooms are equipped with smartboards which integrate technology with learning.

The integrated sports complex comprises an indoor stadium and an outdoor track and field stadium. A swimming pool facility is also available, as well as a horse riding arena. The Cultural Block holds dance studios and art rooms, along with the music room which contains a variety of music instruments for students interested in acquiring musical proficiency. The open air amphitheatre has a seating capacity of over 500 and is used for outdoor performances such as plays, band concerts and graduation ceremonies.

== Early Learning Centres ==
=== Bangalore ===
Indus' proprietary Indus Early Learning Centres (IELCs) form a dedicated group of preschools which prepare children for entry into the main school. Children may transfer into any K-12 institution upon completion of their preschool education.

IELC Bangalore rankings
School	Rank	Year	Source
IELC Whitefield	1	2014	Education World
IELC Whitefield	2	2013	Education World
IELC Whitefield	3	2012	Education World

==== Koramangala ====
IELC Koramangala is expected to launch in 2015. Admissions were scheduled for acceptance in January 2015.

==== Whitefield ====
Bangalore's oldest IELC is IELC Whitefield. It was launched in June 2011 by the Indus Trust. IELC Whitefield is located in one of the major IT hubs of Bangalore in the city-centre, offering an easy commute. IELC Whitefield has consistently been ranked one of the best preschools in Bangalore. In 2012 IELC Whitefield was ranked the #3 preschool, in 2012 it was ranked #2, and in 2014, IELC Whitefield was ranked #1, the best preschool in Bangalore in 2014 in the annual C-Fore/Education World Survey.

==== RMV ====
IELC RMV is expected to launch in 2015. Admissions were scheduled for acceptance January 2015.

== Junior Schools, Hyderabad ==
Indus' proprietary Indus Junior Schools (IJS) form a dedicated group of preschools which prepare children for entry into K-12 schools. Indus Junior School caters to children from Reception to Grade 2 (2 to 7 years of age). The curriculum is based on the IB philosophy, alongside a dedicated Leadership Curriculum, designed to develop and refine the leadership skills of young children. Both preschools in Hyderabad have been ranked some of the best preschools in Hyderabad city.

=== Jubilee Hills ===
The Jubilee Hills preschool (previously known as Indus Early Learning Centre, Jubilee Hills) was opened in June 2011. Admissions are open year-round. The Jubilee Hills preschool has been ranked one of the best preschools in Hyderabad by EducationWorld/C-Fore.

=== Gachibowli ===
The Gachibowli preschool was opened in June 2014. Admissions are open year-round. Within its first year, it was ranked among the top 10 preschools in Hyderabad by Education World/C-Fore.

== Indus Training and Research Institute ==
The Indus Training and Research Institute (ITARI), Bangalore, India was inaugurated on December 1, 2009. As a teacher education institution, ITARI offers the Post Graduate Diploma in International Education, the MA in Education, and the Cambridge International Diploma in Teaching and Learning. Typically, teachers trained from ITARI seek employment in schools offering International Baccalaureate (IB), and International General Certificate of Secondary Education. The faculty at ITARI conduct workshops for in-service teachers in schools of various boards.

== Academic ranking ==
Indus Junior School rankings
School	Rank	Year	Source
Indus Junior School, Jubilee Hills*	1	2013	Education World
Indus Junior School, Jubilee Hills	3	2014	Education World
Indus Junior School, Gachibowli	7	2014	Education World

== See also ==
- List of schools in Bangalore
- List of schools in Pune
- List of schools in Hyderabad
