= Isher Judge Ahluwalia =

Indian economist (1945–2020)

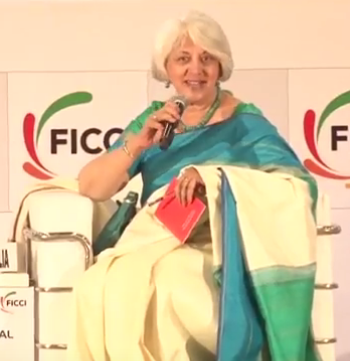
- Born: 1 October 1945
- Died: 26 September 2020 (aged 74)
- Spouse: Montek Singh Ahluwalia

Academic background
- Education: University of Calcutta (B.A.); Delhi School of Economics (M.A.); Delhi University; Massachusetts Institute of Technology (Ph.D)
- Doctoral advisor: Stanley Fischer

Academic work
- Discipline: Economics, public policy, urban infrastructure
- Awards: Padma Bhushan (2009)

Isher Judge Ahluwalia (1 October 1945 – 26 September 2020) was an Indian economist, public policy researcher, and professor. She was Chairperson Emeritus, Board of Governors, at the Indian Council for Research on International Economic Relations (ICRIER). She had also served as the chairperson of the board of the International Food Policy Research Institute, and the chairperson of the Government of India's High-Powered Committee on Urban Infrastructure Services. She was awarded India's 3rd highest civilian award, Padma Bhushan, in 2009.

Ahluwalia's works spanned public policy, urban infrastructure, and sustainable urbanization. Her last book Breaking Through was a memoir and spoke about her career that broke many glass ceilings in the economics and public policy space.

== Education ==
Ahluwalia completed her PhD in economics from Massachusetts Institute of Technology (MIT) with her research focusing on Indian macroeconomy and productivity during the country's economic period between 1951 and 1973, under the American economist Paul Samuelson, and Israeli American economist Stanley Fischer. She also had a master's degree from the Delhi School of Economics, and a bachelor's degree in economics from Presidency College, Kolkata, University of Calcutta. Her research focused on urban development, industrial development, macro-economic reforms, and social sector development issues in India.

== Career ==
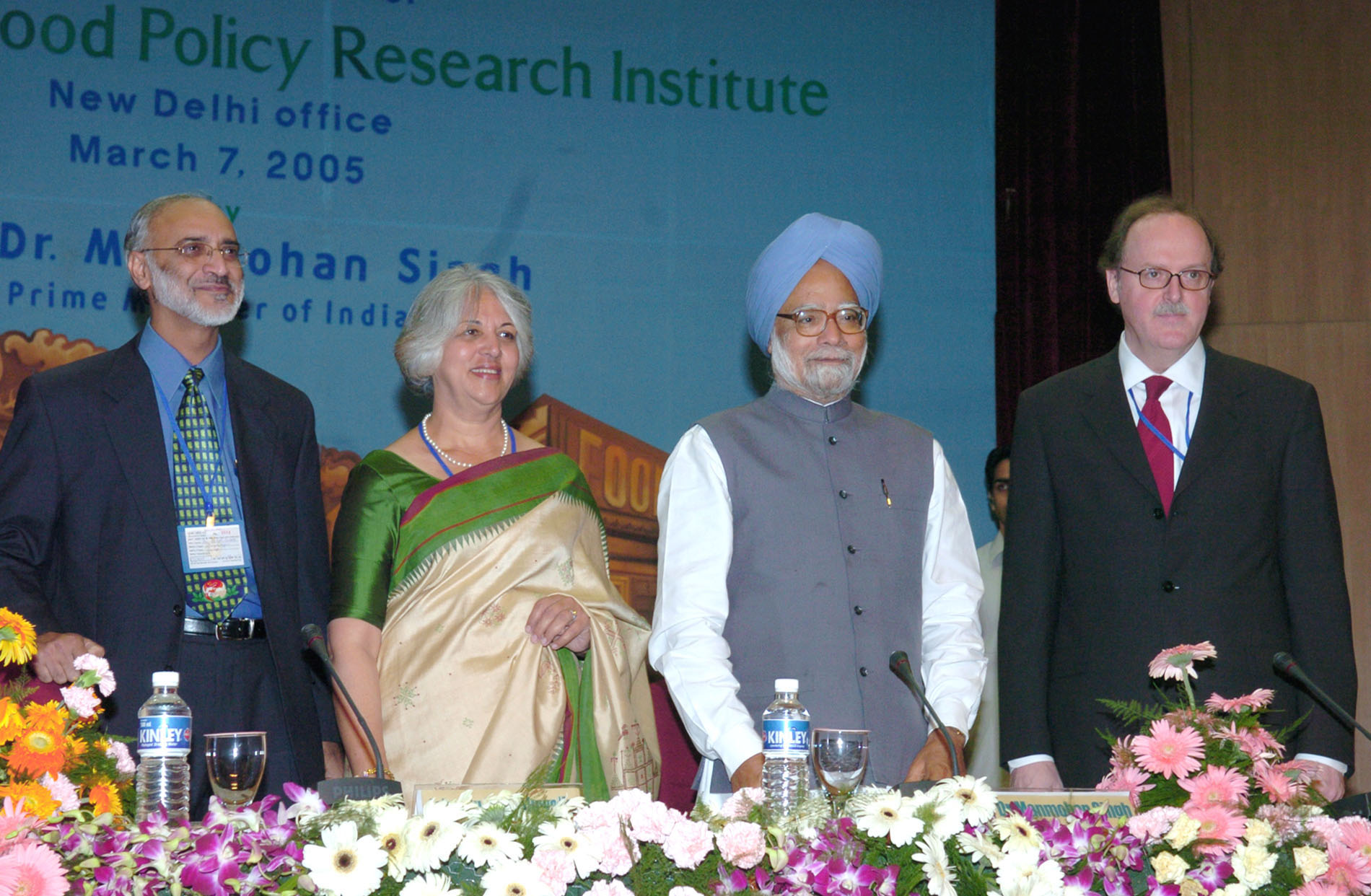
Dr. Ahluwalia with former Indian Prime Minister Dr. Manmohan Singh at the inauguration of the New Delhi office of the International Food Policy Research Institute. (New Delhi, March 2005)

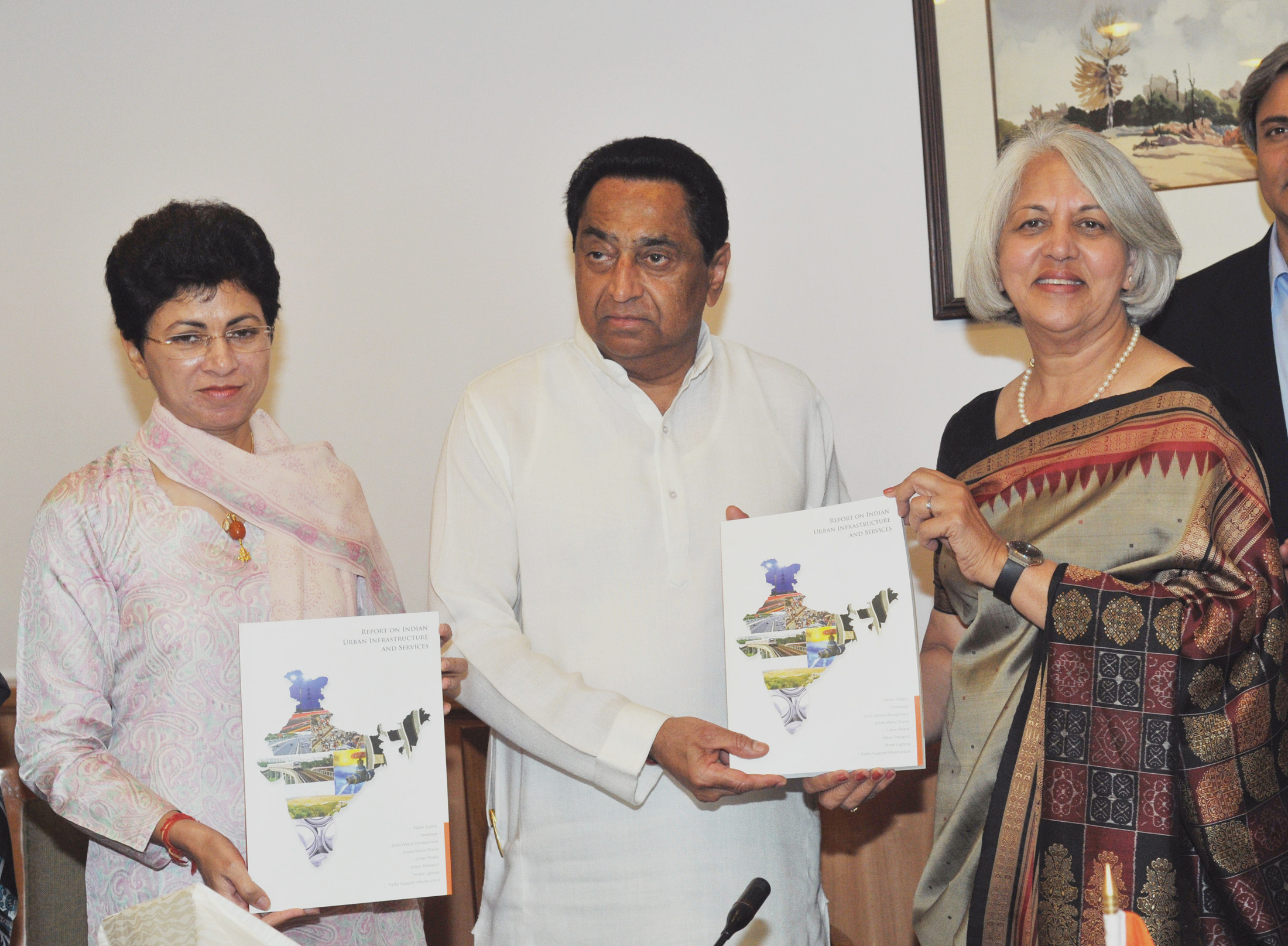
Chairperson Dr. Ahluwalia presenting the report of the High Power Expert Committee for Estimating Investment Requirements for Urban Infrastructure Services to then minister Kamal Nath (New Delhi, March 2011)

Ahluwalia started her career as a policy economist at the International Monetary Fund in Washington, DC, before moving over to India. In India, she did her research focused on industrial growth and manufacturing productivity. She was a professor at the Centre for Policy Research, where she wrote two books – 'Industrial Growth in India: Stagnation since the Mid Sixties', and 'Productivity and Growth in Indian Manufacturing' between 1989 and 1991.

She went on to become the chairperson of the board of governors at the Indian Council for Research on International Economic Relations, and was earlier the director and chief executive at the same institute from 1998 to 2002. She was a Member of the Government of India's National Manufacturing Competitiveness Council. She was also a member of the Board of Trustees of the International Water Management Institute.

She was appointed chairperson of the High Powered Expert Committee on Urban Infrastructure and Services by the Ministry of Urban Development, and the Ministry of Housing and Urban Poverty Alleviation, Government of India, in 2008. She was chairperson, board of trustees of the International Food Policy Research Institute (IFPRI), in Washington, D.C., from 2003 to 2006, and a member of the board from 2000 She was a member of the Eminent Persons Group (EPG) which prepared a report on the role of the Asian Development Bank from 2006 to 2007, and Member of the Eminent Persons Group on India-ASEAN (Association of South East Asian Nations). She served as the Vice Chairperson of the Punjab State Planning Board from 2005 to 2007.

As an author her works spanned public policy, urban infrastructure, and sustainable urbanization, including challenges in delivery of clean drinking water and solid waste management. Her most recent book prior to her death was a memoir titled 'Breaking Through' published in 2020. The book was a reflection on her career in the economics and public policy management space.

== Personal life ==
Ahluwalia was married to fellow economist, and former deputy chairman of the Indian Planning Commission, Montek Singh Ahluwalia. They had two sons, Pawan and Aman Ahluwalia.

She died from grade IV glioblastoma on 26 September 2020, at age 74. She had been battling brain cancer for the preceding 10 months and had stepped down from her position at ICRIER due to her health concerns, a month prior to her death.

== Awards ==
- 2009: Padma Bhushan for Literature and Education by the Government of India.
- 1987: Batheja Memorial Award for best book on Indian Economy, Industrial Growth in India: Stagnation Since the mid-1960s.

== Selected bibliography ==
=== Books ===
- Ahluwalia, Isher (1989). Industrial growth in India: stagnation since the mid-sixties. New Delhi: Oxford University Press. ISBN 9780195624779.
- Ahluwalia, Isher (1991). Productivity and growth in Indian manufacturing. Delhi New York: Oxford University Press. ISBN 9780195627633.
- Ahluwalia, Isher; Little, I.M.D. (2012). India's economic reforms and development: essays for Manmohan Singh. New Delhi: Oxford University Press. ISBN 9780198082231.
- Ahluwalia, Isher; Kanbur, Ravi; Mohanty, P. K. Mohanty (2014). Urbanisation in India: challenges, opportunities and the way forward. New Delhi: Sage. ISBN 9788132119593.
- Ahluwalia, Isher (2014). Transforming our cities: postcards of change. Noida, India: HarperCollins Publishers India. ISBN 9789351362197.
- Ahluwalia, Isher Judge (2020). Breaking Through - A Memoir. New Delhi: Rupa Publications India. ISBN 978-9390260287.

=== Chapters in books ===
- Ahluwalia, Isher (2009), "Challenges of economic development in Punjab", in Kanbur, Ravi; Basu, Kaushik (eds.), Arguments for a better world: essays in honor of Amartya Sen | Volume II: Society, institutions and development, Oxford New York: Oxford University Press, pp. 303–326, ISBN 9780199239979.
