= Bharatiya Vidya Bhavan, Jubilee Hills =

Bharatiya Vidya Bhavan's Public School

Location
- Jubilee Hills, Hyderabad, Telangana, India
- 17.4186°N 78.4092°E

Information
- Motto: Let noble thoughts come to us from every side
- Established: 1979
- Founder: K.M. Munshi
- Principal: Ms. Arunasree
- Faculty: 111
- Enrollment: c. 3000
- Classes: Nursery to Class 12
- Campus size: 8.09 acres (3.27 ha)
- Colours: White and Grey
- Yearbook: Vidya Jyoti
- Affiliation: Central Board of Secondary Education
- Alumni name: Bhavanites
- Website: www.bvbpsjh.in

Bharatiya Vidya Bhavan's Public School - Vidyashram, Jubilee Hills, also known as BVBPSJH, is a private secondary school run by the Bharatiya Vidya Bhavan Educational Trust in Jubilee Hills, Hyderabad, India. It is affiliated to the Central Board of Secondary Education. The principal of the school is Ms. Arunasree ma'am

== Houses ==
The students are categorized into different houses namely - Arjuna, Karna, Krishna, Markandeya, Sri Rama and Vasishta. Each house has a color:

- Arjuna - yellow
- Karna - orange
- Krishna - blue
- Markandeya - violet
- Sri Rama - green
- Vasishta - red

Each house has a captain, vice-captain. There is also an overall school prefectorial team, known collectively as the "Apex Body" with school head boy and girl, deputy head boy and girl, cultural prefect boy and girl, literary prefect boy and girl, social service prefect boy and girl and sports prefect boy and girl. The Head Boy and Girl lead the school student body, and in their absence the school student body is led by the Deputy Head Boy and Girl.

== Awards ==
The school has been a recipient of several awards, namely Intel Award at national level, Computer Literacy Award both at state and national level, 5S Award, instituted by CII International School Award (ISA) instituted by British Council. The school also received the prestigious e-India Jury's Award at national level, Asset Question Making Contest at South Zone and National Level and Heritage Award instituted by INTACH.

== Notable alumni ==
- Nara Lokesh
- Archana (actress)
- Varun Tej
- Tilak Varma

== See also ==
- Education in India
- List of schools in India
- List of schools in Hyderabad, India
