= Arjun Ray =

Arjun Ray may refer to:

- Arjun Ray (general)
- Arjun Ray (MP)
