= National Institute of Tourism and Hospitality Management =

Coordinates: 17.4308°N 78.3641°E

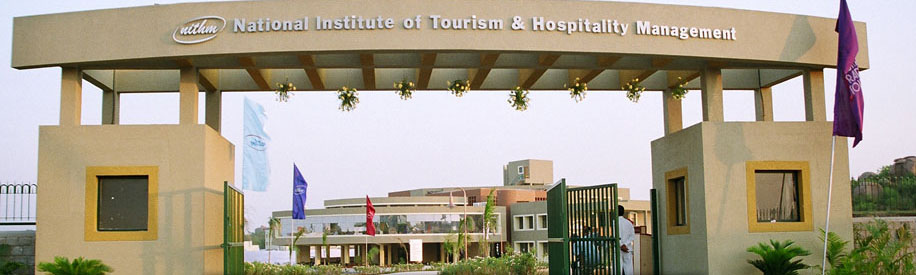
- The entrance of NITHM
- Type: Public
- Established: 2004
- Affiliations: Ministry of Tourism (India), Government of India; Government of Telangana; Jawaharlal Nehru Technological University Hyderabad (JNTUH); National Council for Hotel Management and Catering Technology
- Chairman: Smt Vani Prasad IAS, Chairperson, NITHM & Spl. Chief Secretary, YAT & C Department,
- Director: Prof. V. Venkata Ramana,
- Location: NITHM, Telecomanagr, Gachibowli, Hyderabad - 500032, Telangana, India. Land Line: 040-23000472, Fax: 040-23000471
- Campus: Urban
- Nickname: NITHM
- Website: www.nithm.ac.in

The National Institute of Tourism and Hospitality Management is an Indian hospitality university.

The campus is located on a 30-acre expanse. It is located in the Business and Education hub in Gachibowli of Hyderabad, with a built-up area of about 2 lakh square feet in multiple blocks.

== History ==
It began academic operations in October 2004 and was formally inaugurated by Indian National Congress President Sonia Gandhi on 16 March 2005. It was established under the provisions of the Andhra Pradesh Societies Registration Act—2001.

== Neighborhood ==
The institute is modeled on institutions like Indian Institute of Technology and Indian Institute of Manufacturing and internationally like Harvard Business School and Cornell University.

== Campus ==
The campus is on a green area, with a small lake in front of it. Sri. Zendage Hanumant Kondiba, IAS, is the current Director of NITHM, while Smt. Smita Sabharwal, IAS, serves as the Chairperson of NITHM.

=== Neighborhood ===
NITHM is located at the center of the business district of Gachibowli and Hitech city.

== Degrees ==
- Master of Business Administration (Tourism & Hospitality)
- Bachelor of Business Administration (Tourism & Hospitality)
- B.Sc. (Hospitality & Hotel Administration)
- Diploma in Food Production (Chef)

== Library ==
NITHM Library has a RFID Based Library Management System with KOHA Library Automation Software. It has a collection of 10000+ books, 70 national/international journals, magazines, and newspapers. The library hall covers about 5000 sq. ft. of floor space. NITHM also organized Library Week celebrations and book exhibitions every year.

Faculty, staff, and students are members of the Library and are entitled to access Library documents/services. JNTU, UGC, AICTE, NCHMCT, and WTO Sponsored Research scholars can apply to become members of the Library.
