= Montek Singh Ahluwalia =

Indian economist and civil servant

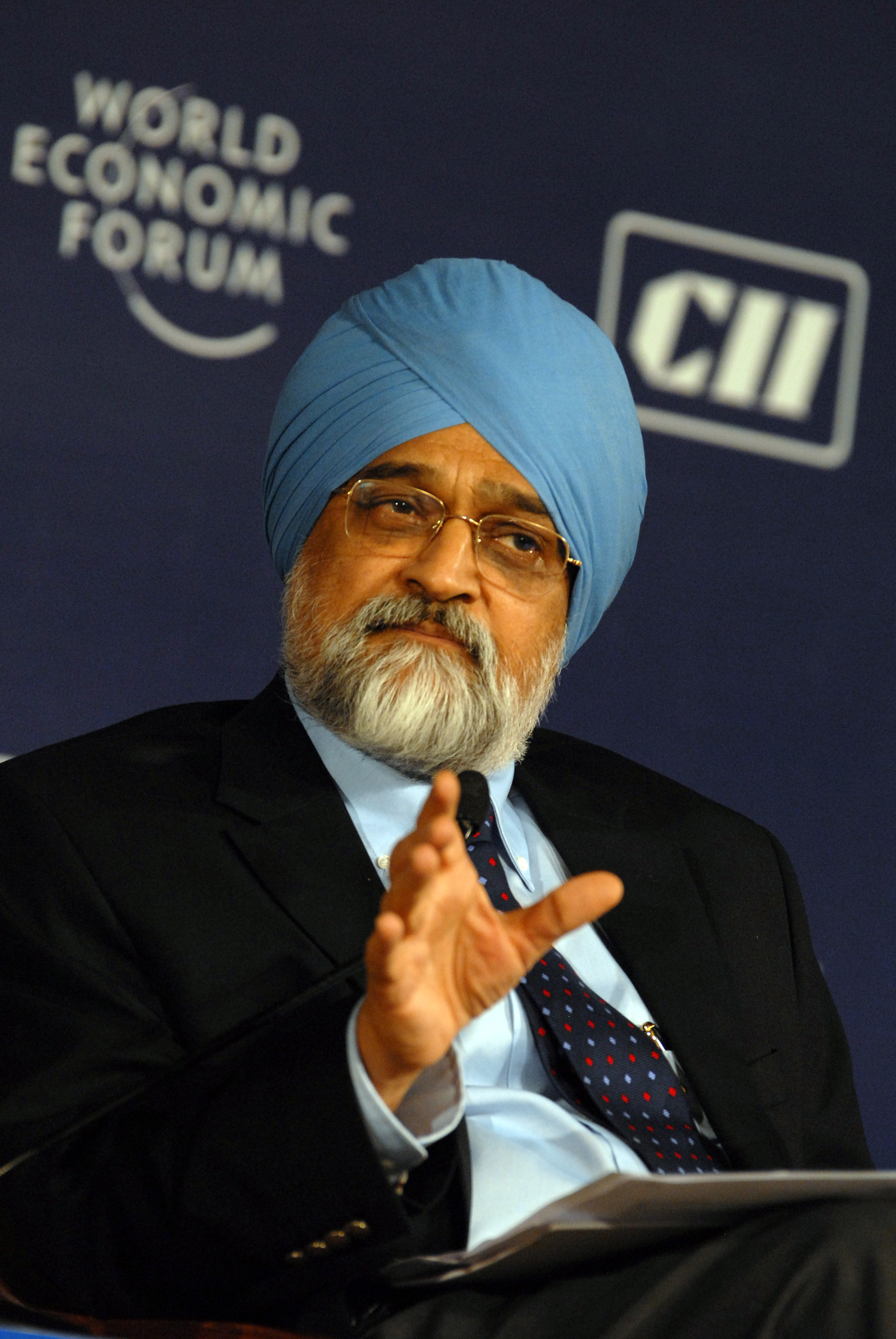

Deputy Chairman of the Planning Commission
- In office 6 July 2004 – 26 May 2014
- Prime Minister: Manmohan Singh
- Preceded by: K.C. Pant
- Succeeded by: Post abolished Arvind Panagariya as Vice-Chairman of NITI Aayog

Personal details
- Born: 24 November 1943 (age 82) Rawalpindi, Punjab Province, British India (modern-day Punjab, Pakistan)
- Spouse: Isher Judge Ahluwalia (until her death in 2020)
- Children: 2
- Education: Delhi University (B.A.); University of Oxford (M.A., M.Phil.)
- Profession: Economist; Civil servant

Montek Singh Ahluwalia (born 24 November 1943) is an Indian economist and civil servant who was the Deputy Chairman of the Planning Commission of India, a position which carried the rank of a Cabinet Minister. He resigned from this post in May 2014 following the impending end of the UPA II regime at the center. He was previously the first director of the Independent Evaluation Office at the International Monetary Fund.

== Early life and education ==
Montek Singh Ahluwalia was born in Rawalpindi, British India, as the son of Jagmohan Singh, a clerk with the Defence Accounts Department, and Pushp Kaur. He was educated at St. Patrick's High School, Secunderabad, and at Delhi Public School in Delhi. He then graduated with a B.A. (Hons.) degree in Economics from St. Stephen's College, Delhi, of the Delhi University.

Ahluwalia was a Rhodes scholar at the University of Oxford, where he studied at Magdalen College, Oxford, as a graduate, obtaining an M.A. degree in philosophy, politics, and economics. He then read for an MPhil at St Antony's College, Oxford. While at Oxford, he was president of the Oxford Union. He has received several honorary degrees, including an honorary degree of Doctor of Civil Law from the University of Oxford and an honorary degree of Doctor of Philosophy from the Indian Institute of Technology, Roorkee. He is an Honorary Fellow of Magdalen College.

== Career ==
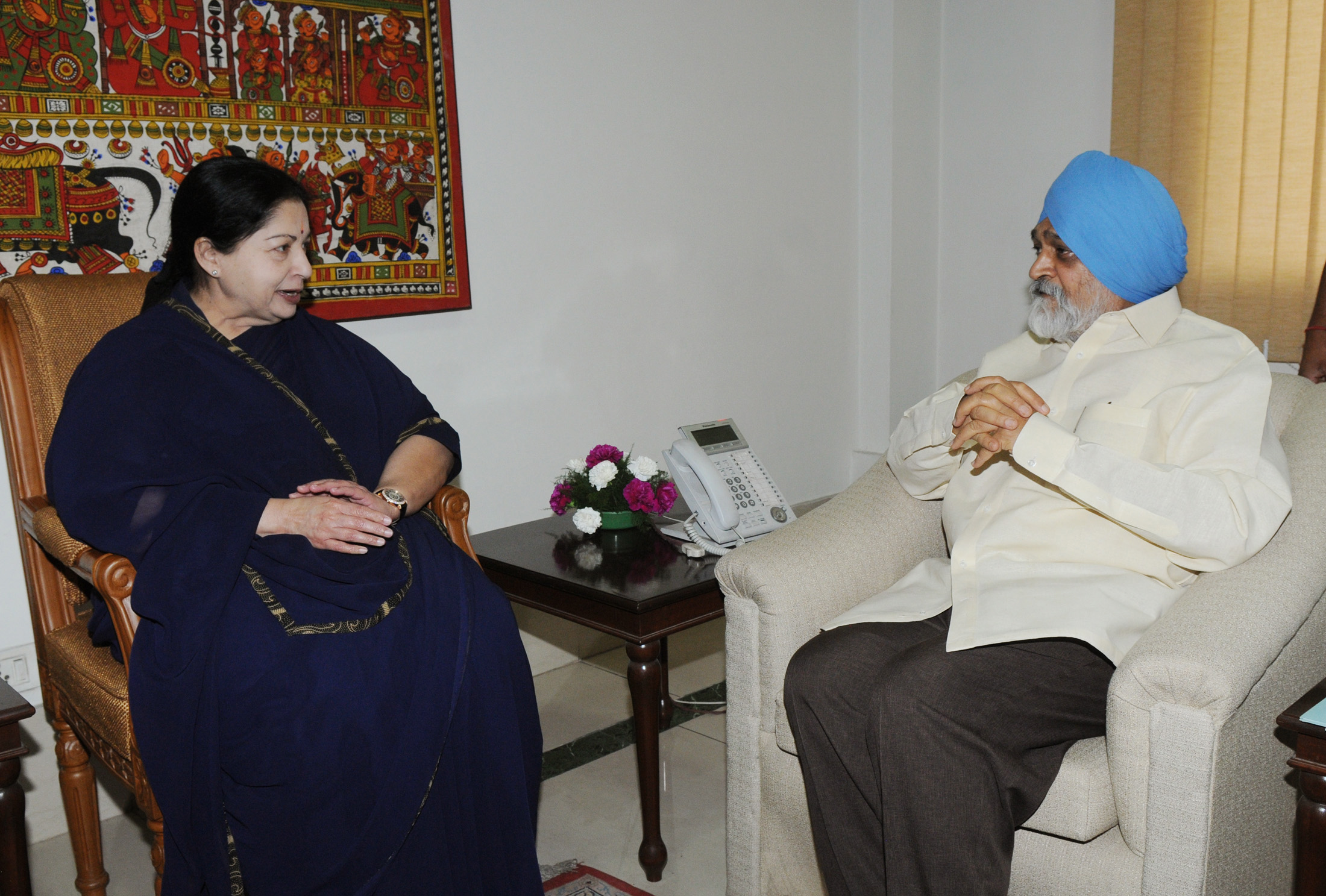
Ahluwalia with Tamil Nadu Chief Minister Jayalalithaa in 2013

After graduating from University of Oxford, Ahluwalia joined the World Bank in 1968. At the age of 28, he became the youngest "Division Chief" in the World Bank's bureaucracy, in charge of the Income Distribution Division in the World Bank's Development Research Centre. After his return to India in 1979 he took up the position of Economic Adviser in the Ministry of Finance. He held several senior positions as a civil servant, including Special Secretary to the Prime Minister, Commerce secretary, Secretary Department of Economic Affairs in the Finance Ministry and Finance Secretary. In 1998 he was appointed Member of the Planning Commission. In 2001, he was chosen by the Board of International Monetary Fund to be the first director of the newly created Independent Evaluation Office, in which capacity he supervised several studies critical of various aspects of the functioning of the IMF. In June 2004, he resigned from the IMF position to take up as the deputy chairman of the Planning Commission as part of the United Progressive Alliance government in New Delhi.

As deputy chairman of the Planning Commission, he supervised the preparation of both the Eleventh Plan (2007–08 to 2011–12) titled "Towards Faster and More Inclusive Growth" and subsequently also the Twelfth Plan (2012–13 to 2016–17) titled "Faster, More Inclusive and Sustainable Growth".

He has published a number of articles on various aspects of the Indian economy in academic journals. He is one of the authors of "Redistribution with Growth" by Chenery et al., published by Oxford University Press in 1974. He has also written on various aspects of India's economic reforms and on the inclusiveness of India's growth process.

In 2011 Ahluwalia was awarded the Padma Vibhushan, India's second highest civilian honour for public service by Mrs Pratibha Patil, then President of India.

In February 2020, he published his book Backstage: The Story Behind India’s High Growth Years with Rupa Publications. The book is a mix of personal reflections and national economic history, and sets forth Ahluwalia's ideas on issues of contemporary significance including education, rural development and energy.

He currently holds the position of Distinguished Fellow at the Centre for Social and Economic Progress - a New Delhi based think tank. In June 2021, Ahluwalia was named to the high level advisory group formed jointly by IMF and World bank in the face of dual challenges of Climate Change and COVID-19 pandemic.

== Publications ==
=== Journal articles ===
- Ahluwalia, Montek Singh (August 1994). "Ensuring a prosperous future". Yojana. 38 (12–13).
- Ahluwalia, Montek Singh. "India's economic reforms: an appraisal". Planning Commission. Government of India. Archived from the original on 6 October 2014.

=== Book ===
- Backstage: The Story Behind India’s High Growth Years (15 February 2020), Rupa Publications India, ISBN 9353338212

=== Chapters in books ===
- Ahluwalia, Montek Singh (2009), "Growth, distribution and inclusiveness: reflections on India's experience", in Kanbur, Ravi; Basu, Kaushik (eds.), Arguments for a better world: essays in honor of Amartya Sen | Volume II: Society, institutions and development, Oxford New York: Oxford University Press, pp. 327–349, ISBN 9780199239979.

=== World Bank ===
- Ahluwalia, Montek Singh (1977). Rural poverty and agricultural performance in India. Washington, D.C.: The World Bank. OCLC 236128470. Reprint series number 60.

== Personal life ==
Ahluwalia was married to fellow economist Isher Judge Ahluwalia and has two sons Pawan Ahluwalia and Aman Ahluwalia.

== Awards and honours ==
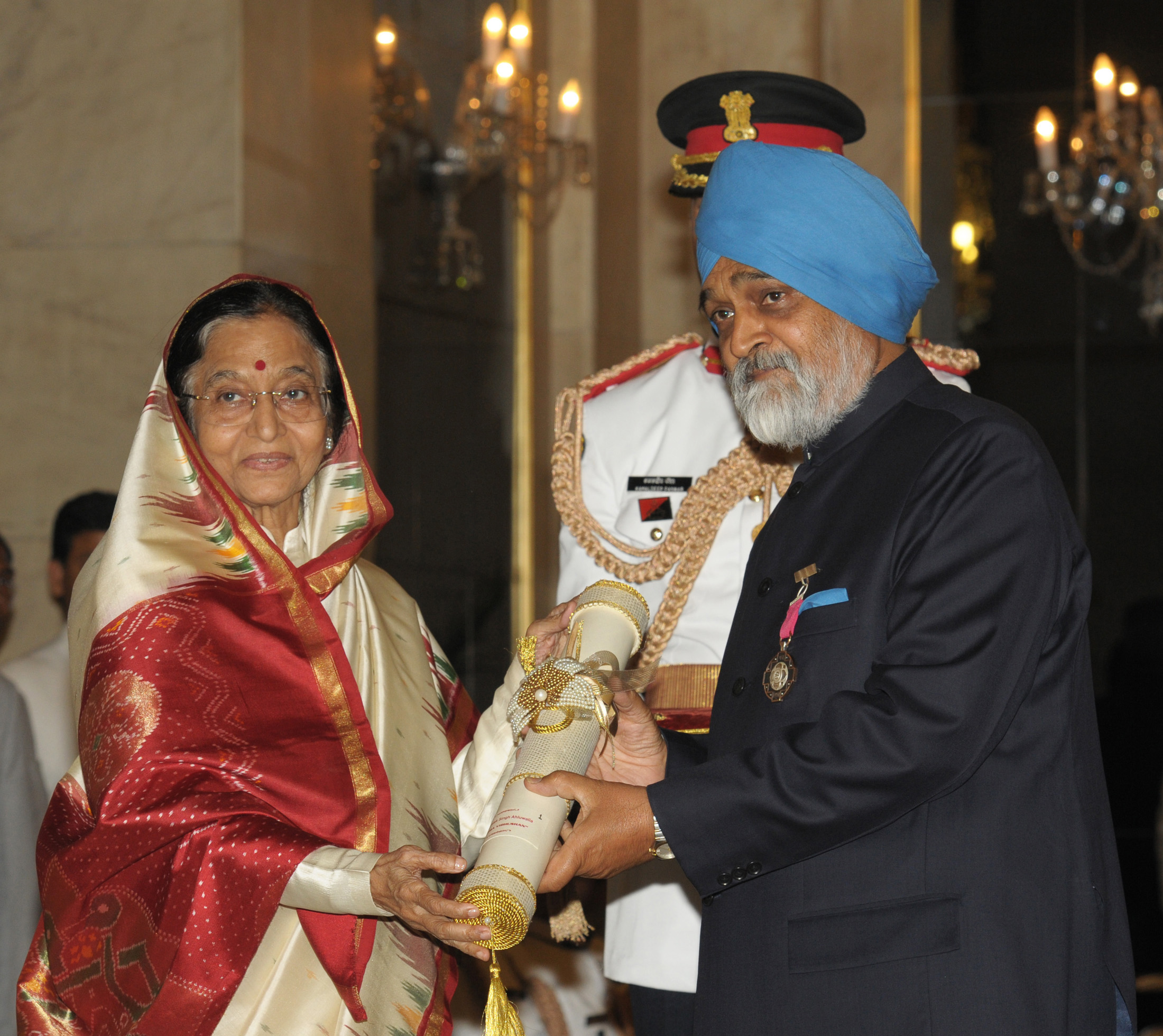
The President Pratibha Devisingh Patil presenting the Padma Vibhushan Award to Shri Montek Singh Ahluwalia, former Deputy Chairman, Planning Commission, at an Investiture Ceremony II, at Rashtrapati Bhavan, in New Delhi on April 01, 2011

Year of award or honor	Name of award or honor	Awarding organization
2013	Honoris Causa Doctorate of Science	Indian School of Mines
2011	Honoris Causa Doctorate of Science	IIT Roorkee.
2011	Padma Vibhushan	President of India.
2008	Doctor of Civil Law	Oxford University.
