= Arjun Ray (general) =

Indian general

Lieutenant General Arjun Ray PVSM, VSM
- Born: 1 January 1944 (age 82); Calcutta (now Kolkata), West Bengal, India
- Education: St Xavier's School, Jaipur; University of Rajasthan
- Occupations: Ex-Army general, company executive
- Spouse: Saroj
- Children: Sonali & Abhimanyu

Lieutenant General Arjun Ray, PVSM, VSM is a former general officer of the Indian Army. He is the founder of the Indus Trust and has been their Managing Director and Chief Executive Officer since 1 April 2002. He is a graduate of the Staff College, Camberley, the Army War College, Mhow and the National Defence College.

He served as India's Deputy Military Advisor in London from 1986 to 1989. In his last assignment before retiring, Ray was the General Officer commanding the newly raised XIV Corps in Ladakh, wherein he redefined the role of the armed forces in the 21st century as war prevention. As part of Operation Sadbhavana (Goodwill), he set up 13 primary schools, 11 Women's Empowerment Centres, 60 Adult Education Centres for illiterate women; and a hospital in Siachen close to the Line of Control in Jammu and Kashmir. This was achieved in nine months.

He was awarded the Param Vishisht Seva Medal for his service in the Indian military.

== Early life ==
Arjun Ray was born on 1 January 1944 in Kolkata. He completed his schooling at the St Xavier School in Jaipur, and graduated from the University of Rajasthan with a degree in humanities. Before joining the Indian Military Academy in 1963, he was sponsored by Rotary International to visit New Zealand and Australia for three months, as a member of the Indian universities' debating team.

== Army ==
Arjun Ray was commissioned into the 8th Battalion of the Kumaon Regiment on 9 February 1964. As a young officer, he participated in the 1965 and 1971 Indo-Pakistan Wars. Later, he was selected to attend the Scientific Reorientation Course in Shrivenham, England; and the British Army Staff College at Camberley. He holds an Master's degree in Defence Studies from the University of Madras and is a graduate of the Higher Command Course and the National Defence College, New Delhi.

Before commanding a mechanized brigade on the Western Front, he was posted in London as the Deputy Military Advisor from 1986 to 1989. During this tenure, as a member of the International Institute for Strategic Studies, and the Royal United Services Institution, he was an active participant in international seminars and symposiums on international security.

The General's command assignments have been varied: from armoured units and formations – 13 Mechanized Infantry Battalion, 39 Mechanized Brigade and 33 Armored Division, to commanding 14 Corps at high altitudes in Ladakh. For distinguished command of his battalion and brigade, he was awarded the Commendation Card of the Chief of the Army Staff and the Vishisht Seva Medal, respectively.

Immediately after graduating from the National Defence College, he served as the Brigadier General Staff in 15 Corps in the Kashmir Valley. It was during this period that he wrote his first book, Kashmir Diary, The Psychology of Militancy. Thereafter, he was promoted to the rank of Major General, and was responsible for tactical training of company, squadron and battery commanders in the Junior Command Wing at the College of Combat, Mhow.

Soon after this instructional assignment, he was given the command of the 33 Armored Division (October 1996 to March 1998). From instructional to command assignments, the General was side-stepped as a Major General to head Doctrine in Headquarters Army Training Command (ARTRAC), between March 1998 to June 2000. This was an excellent opportunity to be part of a team that was evolving war doctrine for the 21st century, including strategies and structures for higher defence organizations.

At the time of the Kargil War (June to August 1999), the General was selected by the Army Chief to lead the information campaign, including media relations, on behalf of the Army.

On 12 June 2000, he was promoted to the rank of Lieutenant General, and given command of the newly raised 14 Corps in Ladakh. Its troops were deployed at the Line of Control opposite Pakistan, and the Line of Actual Control in Western Tibet.

- NOTE- Arjun Ray's promotion was given not for exemplary service but rather as he was the most "experienced" along with the great military shortage due to the Kargil War

Arjun is happily married to Saroj for over 51 years. They have a daughter Sonali, who heads an early learning centre in Bangalore; and a son, Abhimanyu, a renowned casting director in Mumbai.

== Operation Sadhbhavana ==
Soon after taking over the Corps, the General decided on winning over alienated communities, and thus forestalling insurgency from spilling over into Ladakh from the rest of Jammu and Kashmir. He focused on the people of Ladakh as his centre of gravity, as he believed that security and development were key elements of border management. Towards this end, he launched Operation Sadbhavana (Goodwill), a mass campaign to win over the hearts and minds of the local population by concentrating more on human development, than other forms of traditional development, as practised in most countries. He emphasized primary education, health care up to the tertiary level, women's empowerment, community development and information technology for peace. He even succeeded in obtaining VSAT terminals to provide Internet connectivity in schools located in remote mountainous areas above heights of 10,000 feet. For his contribution to nation-building and command of troops in Ladakh, he was honoured with the Param Vishisht Seva Medal, the highest award in the military for distinguished service. As a result of his contribution to women's empowerment in conflict areas, he was also considered as India's entry for 2002 - for the Commonwealth Award on Women's Empowerment.

== Retirement ==
The General's second innings started on 2 April. 2002 as the CEO of the Indus Group of International Schools, with its head office in Bangalore. In the past two decades, he has set up three International Baccalaureate schools in Bangalore, Hyderabad and Pune. The fourth international school (IGCSE) is in Belgavi, Karnataka. The IB schools are among the first ten in India, and the Bangalore school has been ranked Number 1 in the country for ten consecutive years.

Lt General Ray's distinction lies in transforming international education by building an effective ecosystem (the first of its kind in the world) comprising the Indus Training and Research Institute for pre-service and in-service teacher training; the Indus Leadership School at Kanakapura, near Bangalore; and the Indus Equal Opportunity School for the less privileged.

The General has contributed to educational projects, such as the introduction of teacher-robots to assist teachers in re-roling themselves to “teach the child and not the subject alone”; and StartupYou, a school which trains students to be future-ready and become entrepreneurs. He is presently leading a team in designing the schools of the future.

He has authored three books: Kashmir Diary, The Psychology of Militancy; Peace is Everybody's Business; and What Google Cannot Teach.
