= The Hyderabad Public School, Begumpet =

School in Telangana State, Begumpet, Secunderabad, India

Coordinates: 17.4442°N 78.4572°E

Hyderabad Public School
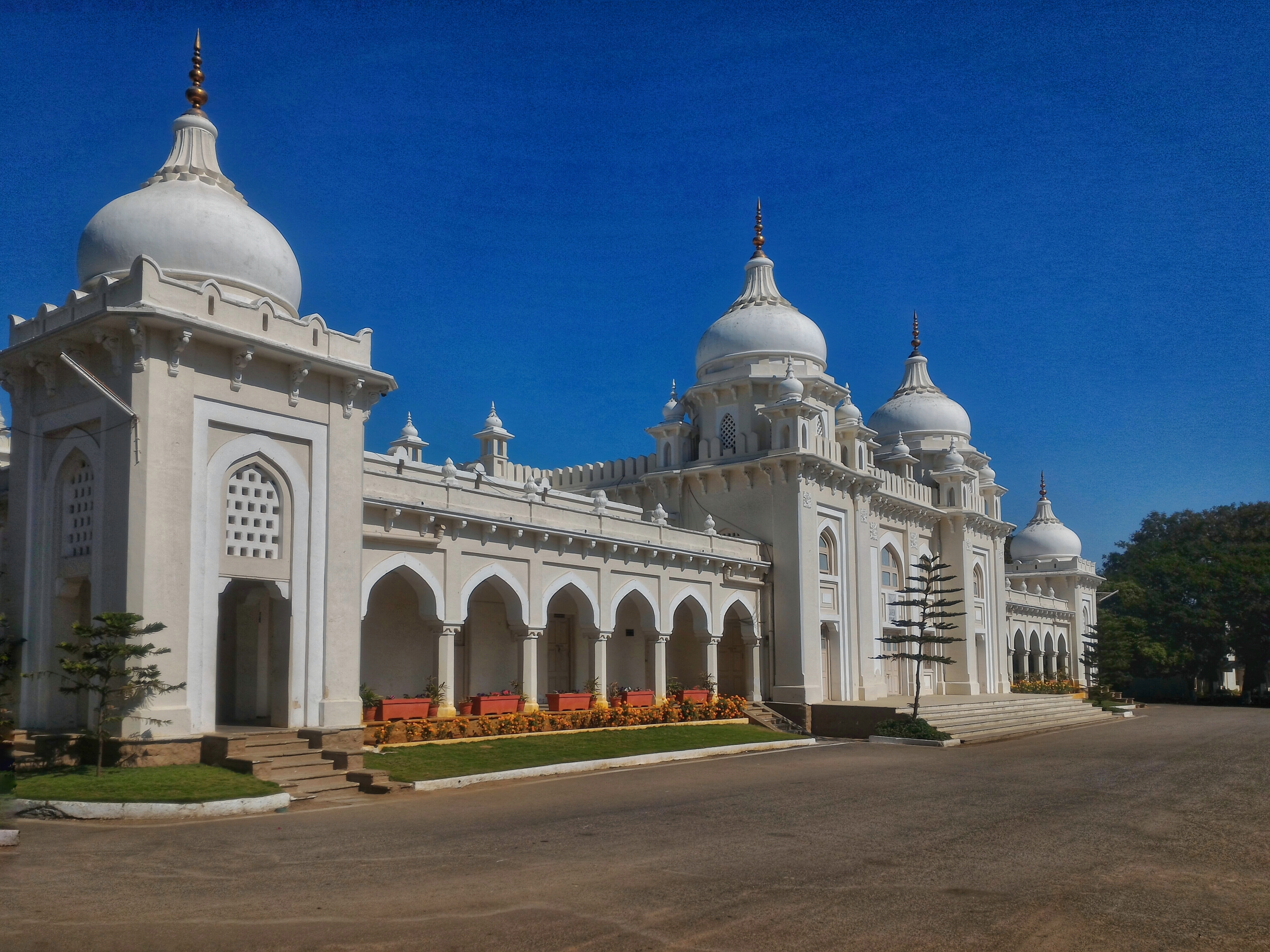
- Begumpet; Hyderabad, Telangana State; India

Information
- Other name: HPS, Begumpet
- Former name: Jagirdars' College
- Type: Public school (privately funded)
- Motto: Be Vigilant
- Established: 1923; 103 years ago
- Founder: Nizam VII of Hyderabad
- School district: Hyderabad State Capital
- Principal: Dr. Skand Bali
- Faculty: 155
- Enrollment: 3200 (pre-primary to 12th grade)
- Campus size: 152 acres (89 acres of which allotted by H.E. Lady Viqar-ul-Umara)
- Website: www.hpsbegumpet.org.in

The Hyderabad Public School, Begumpet or HPS, Begumpet (formerly Jagirdars’ College) is a privately funded public school in Hyderabad, Telangana, India. The school has grades from pre-primary to the 12th (ages 3 to 17). The school is affiliated with the Council for the Indian School Certificate Examinations (ICSE, ISC), the International Baccalaureate (IB) and Cambridge International Education (CIE). It is managed by the Hyderabad Public School Society and the Board of Governors.

== History ==
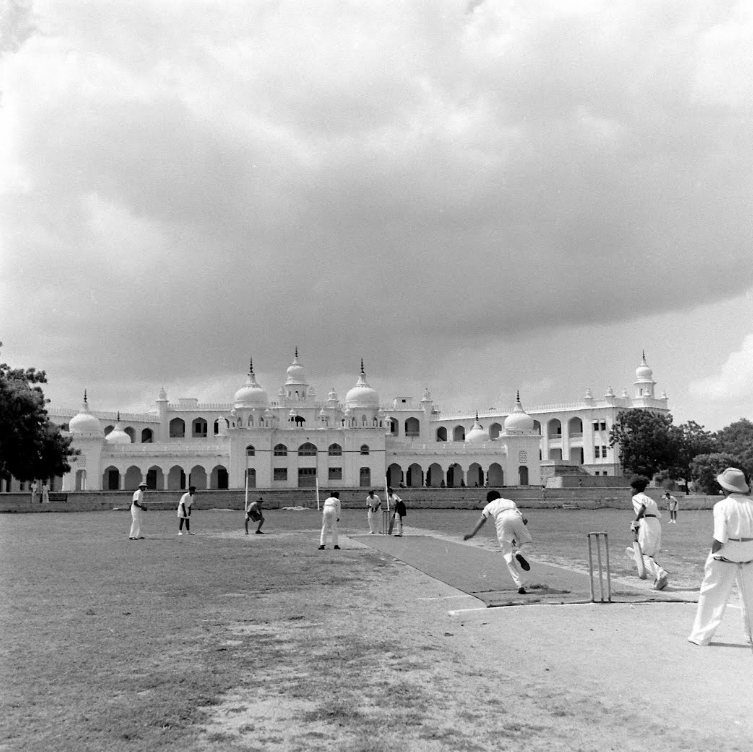
Students playing a cricket match in front of the main building of the former Jagirdars' College (c. 1940s)

It was established in 1923 as Jagirdars' College by the Seventh Nizam of Hyderabad, Mir Osman Ali Khan, and served as a school exclusively for the sons of nawabs, jagirdars and other aristocrats and elites. After the Zamindari system was abolished in 1950, it was renamed as the Hyderabad Public School in 1951.

== Campus ==
The school has a 122-acre (0.49 km^{2}) campus with buildings built in the Indo-Saracenic style.

== Recognition ==
HPS, Begumpet has widely been recognized as one of the best lower educational institutions in India. Accolades include:

- Education World: The Hyderabad Public School was ranked first in Telangana & Hyderabad and sixth in India in the Co-ed Day-cum-Boarding Schools category for 2018–19.
- Future 50 Award: The Hyderabad Public School, Begumpet has been ranked as one among the Future 50 schools shaping the success in the Country.
- Education Today's India School Merit Awards: The Hyderabad Public School has been ranked third in India and first in the state and city under India's Top 20 Day-cum-Boarding Schools for exemplary contribution to the education field.
- India's Best Standalone Senior Secondary School and Best Innovative K-12 School Awards: In 2018, at the GTF Education Summit & Awards conducted by Global Triumph foundation in New Delhi, The Hyderabad Public School was honoured as India's Best Standalone Senior Secondary School and Best Innovative K-12 School.
- Great Place to Study by Global League Institute: The school was selected in the list of 'great places to study' by the Global League Institute based on the Student Satisfaction Survey. The honour was awarded by the British House of Commons.

== Notable alumni ==
Name	Occupation	References
Satya Nadella	CEO of Microsoft	
Shailesh Jejurikar	President & CEO of Procter & Gamble	
Ajaypal Singh Banga	President of the World Bank; Former CEO of Mastercard; Vice Chairman of General Atlantic; Chairman of Exor	
Shantanu Narayen	President and CEO of Adobe Inc.	
Prem Watsa	Business magnate and CEO of Fairfax Financial	
Jonnalagedda Chalapati	Air Marshal	
Raghu Ram Pillarisetti	Padma Shri Awardee & Founding Director, KIMS-Ushalakshmi Centre for Breast Diseases at KIMS Hospitals	
Megha Mittal	Former chairman and MD of Italian fashion house Escada	
Karan Bilimoria, Baron Bilimoria	Founder and CEO, Cobra Beer	
Saad Bin Jung	Cricketer and conservationist	
Syed Akbaruddin	Indian diplomat and Permanent Representative of India to the United Nations	
Menaka Guruswamy	Senior advocate in the Supreme Court of India	
Ashok Gajapathi Raju	Former Civil Aviation Minister	
M. M. Pallam Raju	Former Minister of Human Resource Development	
Nallari Kiran Kumar Reddy	Former Chief Minister of Andhra Pradesh	
Y. S. Jaganmohan Reddy	Former Chief Minister of Andhra Pradesh	
Gaddam Vivek Venkatswamy	Lok Sabha MP	
Asaduddin Owaisi	Lok Sabha MP	
Akbaruddin Owaisi	Telangana MLA	
Mekapati Goutham Reddy	MLA	
Nagarjuna	Actor and producer in the Telugu film industry and entrepreneur	
Ram Charan	Actor and producer in the Telugu film industry and entrepreneur	
Sharwanand	Actor in the Telugu film industry	
Rana Daggubati	Actor in the Telugu film industry	
Sumanth	Actor in the Telugu film industry	
Harsha Bhogle	Cricket commentator	
D. Bala Venkatesh Varma	Diplomat	
Ramendra Kumar	Author of children's books	
Nikhil Siddhartha	Actor in the Telugu film industry	
Sridhar Tayur	Entrepreneur and professor at Carnegie Mellon University	
Teja Sajja	Actor in the Telugu Film Industry	
Samay Raina	Indian Stand-up Comedian and YouTuber	

== See also ==
- The Hyderabad Public School, Ramanthapur
- List of schools in Hyderabad, India
