= St. Patrick's High School, Secunderabad =

St. Patrick's High School

Location
- Secunderabad, Telangana; India; 17°26′21″N 78°30′3″E

Information
- Former name: St. Patrick's European High School
- Type: Private primary and secondary school
- Motto: Latin: Virtus et Labor (Virtue and Effort)
- Religious affiliation: Catholicism
- Denomination: Jesuits
- Established: 1911; 115 years ago
- Principal: Fr. A. Elango, S.J.
- Faculty: 100
- Grades: KG - 10
- Enrollment: 3,400
- Houses: Gandhi - green (Patrick); Ambedkar - yellow (Gabriel); Akbar - blue (Andrew); Loyola - red (David); Xavier - pink
- Colours: Gold and green
- Sports: Cricket, football, basketball, table tennis, badminton, athletics
- Accreditation: Indian Certificate of Secondary Education
- Website: www.stpatrickshighschool.ac.in

St. Patrick's High School, formerly known as St. Patrick's European High School, is a private Catholic primary and secondary school, located on Sebastian Road in Secunderabad, Telangana, India. The school was established by the Jesuits in 1911. The school was a boys'-only school from kindergarten to 10th grade and it has since become a co-education school and follows the Indian Certificate of Secondary Education (ISCE) curriculum.

== History ==
The school was established in 1911 by Fr. H. Colli. While the school is a Catholic educational institution, with the primary aim of providing education to local Catholic boys, students of other faiths are also admitted.

The school had a humble beginning under the leadership of Fr. Colli with 35 students in 1911. In April that year, the students took the Madras Middle Certificate Examination. The school was then under the supervision of the Inspector of European Schools.

In 1916, standard VII was added and the student body increased to 102. In 1918 kindergarten was added. By 1936, St. Patrick's was a full-fledged high school and celebrated its silver jubilee. The school was under the guidance of the Brothers of St. Gabriel from 1936 to 1956. They introduced the old house system of four i.e. Patrick, Gabriel, Andrew and David among the students for healthy competition. Later at the beginning of the 21st Century the house system was changed to five i.e. Gandhi, Ambedkar, Akbar, Loyola and Xavier. The Archdiocese of Hyderabad took over the school in 1956 until 1973.

In 1973, the administration was transferred to the Jesuit Fathers of Andhra Province, belonging to the Society of Jesus (founded by St. Ignatius of Loyola). The Jesuits brought many changes to the school. Parent visits on the second Saturday of every month was introduced. The rank system was replaced by the grade system. The old building was demolished and the playground was extended. A spacious and ventilated building was built for the kindergarten and elementary sections.

The school celebrated its platinum jubilee in 1986. Computer education was introduced in 1989. In 1991, basketball, tennis, and skating courts were constructed. Remedial hour system was introduced in 1997. The St. Patrick's Old Boys Association was rejuvenated around the same time. St. Patrick's High held it centenary celebrations on 12 February 2011. The 109th celebration was at 1 February 2020.

== School administration ==
Being a Catholic institution, it is governed by article 30(1) of the Indian Constitution. It has a staff of 100 and an enrollment of 3,400 students. Since its inception more than 30,000 attended. The school has five houses – Gandhi, Loyola, Akbar, Ambedkar and Xavier – represented by green, red, blue, yellow and pink respectively. These houses were previously known as Davids, Patricks, Andrews, and Gabriels.

St. Pat's celebrates Nostalgia Day for its alumni on the first Sunday of every year. The school provides extra-curricular activities – sports and competitions, including football, basketball, cricket and tennis teams. It conducts an annual inter-school basketball tournament organised by the alumni association, named after their former principal the late Father Devasia. It has produced several IITians and an International Mathematical Olympiad gold medalist.

== School emblem and motto ==
The school emblem consists of a green shield inscribed with two golden crosses on the upper right and lower left corners. A white belt runs across with three golden shamrocks for its patron St. Patrick. The motto is Virtus et Labor, virtue and hard work.

== Notable alumni ==
- Montek Singh Ahluwalia, deputy chairman of the Planning Commission, government of India
- Justice T. Amarnath Goud, Honorable Judge High Court, State of Telangana

== See also ==
- List of Jesuit schools
- List of schools in Telangana
