= Solitaire Global Schools =

Location
- Hyderabad, India
- Coordinates: 17.358892°N 78.412269°E

Information
- School type: Private International School
- Motto: Let's aspire for excellence.
- Established: June 2017
- Founder: Mir Murtuza Ali
- Dean: Daniyal Murtuza Ali
- Grades: Pre-Primary to Standard XII
- Enrollment: 900+
- Average class size: 30
- Campus size: 3 acres
- Campus type: Urban
- Affiliation: Cambridge Assessment International Education
- Website: https://www.solitaireglobalschools.com/

Solitaire Global Schools (commonly abbreviated to SGS) is a group of schools based in Hyderabad, Telangana, India. It was established in June 2017 and has two branches in Hyderabad at Attapur and Kattedan. The school provides the Cambridge Assessment International Education (CAIE) curriculum for the pre-primary, primary and secondary grade students. The school also provides Cambridge Advanced classes for higher grade students. The school is a member of AFS and India-based Members of International Schools Association (MISA).

During the lockdown in India from the COVID-19 pandemic, the school released its own online learning platform called SI Learner's Hub.

The school's students volunteer in the community by taking care of park adopted by the school.

== Academics ==
The school follows the Cambridge Assessment International Education curriculum as such they provide the following programmes for the students education.

- Cambridge Primary (5 to 11 years old)
- Cambridge lower secondary (11 to 14 years old)
- Cambridge upper secondary (14 to 16 years old)
- Cambridge advanced (16 to 19 years old)

The school has a large campus of 3 acres for several sports activities like cricket, football and basketball.
