= Pallavi Model School =

Pallavi Model School, Boduppal
- Hyderabad, Telangana; India

Information
- Type: Private school
- Motto: Tamasoma Jyotirgamaya (From darkness, lead me to light)
- Principal: Mrs. Tanuja
- Gender: Co-educational
- Classes offered: Nursery, LKG, UKG, Class 1 to 12
- Language: English
- Campus: Urban
- Houses: Cauvery; Ganga; Godavari; Krishna
- Affiliations: Central Board of Secondary Education
- Website: www.pallavimodelschools.org/boduppal

Pallavi Model Schools, is a group of English medium co-educational schools affiliated to the Central Board of Secondary Education, New Delhi, India. CBSE Curriculum from Class I to XII. The Pallavi educational society has initiated Pallavi Model School in June 1994. The Pallavi Group of schools celebrated its Silver Jubilee in 2019

== Branches ==
=== Pallavi Model School, Bowenpally ===
The main branch is present in Hasmathpet, Bowenpally. It teaches kindergarten and grades 1–12. The silver jubilee celebrations of the school was held in November 2019.

=== Akshara Vaagdevi International School, TIvoli ===
There are seven branches of pre school chain named Pallavi KIDZ. They are in:

- Mahendra Hills
- Manikonda
- Tarnaka
- Sainikpuri
- DD Colony
- Kavuri Hills
- Habsiguda
