= Vignan Schools =

Vignan Group of Schools

Location
- Andhra Pradesh/Telangana; India

District information
- Type: Educational institution
- Established: 1982

Other information
- Website: www.vignanschools.org

Vignan Schools, located in several places in Andhra Pradesh and Telangana, India, consists of 20 campuses. Established in 1982, Vignan started as Vignan Tutorials and in 1983 started its first high school.

== History ==
Vignan Group of Schools were established as Vignan Tutorials in 1982 by Dr.L. Rathaiah who completed his postgraduation and doctoral thesis on child psychology. He started Vignan High School in 1983. His childhood goal of educating the people around him has resulted in lakhs of students receiving quality education in his institutions.

== Campuses ==
Vignan Group of Schools are located at over 20 locations all over Andhra Pradesh and Telangana covering seven different cities.

=== Hyderabad ===
- Vignan Bo Tree School, Nizampet
- Vignan Global Gen School, Madinaguda
- Vignan's Prabodhananda Prashanti Niketan, Ghatkesar
- Vignan's Global Gen School, Medchal
- Vignan Global Gen School, ECIL
- Vignan World One School, Kondapur
- Vignan Vidyalayam, Patancheru

=== Guntur ===
- Vignan High School, LIC Colony
- Vignan Residential High School, Palakaluru
- Vignan Little Public School, Brindavan Gardens
- Nandi Next Gen School, Nandipadu

=== Vizag ===
- Vignan Steel City Public School, Duvvada
- Vignan Vidyalayam High School, Siripuram
- Vignan Vidyalayam High School, Thimmapuram

=== Rajamahendravaram ===
- Vignan Global Gen School, Diwan Cheruvu
- Vignan Cotton School, Pitlavani Cheruvu

=== Ongole ===
- Vignan Global Gen School, Ongole

=== Eluru ===
- Vignan World one School, Bhogapuram

=== Khammam ===
- Rahul Vignan Vidyalayam, Charla

== Academics ==
=== CBSE ===
Vignan schools Hyderabad follow CBSE syllabus. World one School in Kondapur provides CBSE & Cambridge syllabus.

== Student activities ==
=== Vignanothsav ===
Vignanothsav is a unique initiative taken by Vignan Global Gen Schools to bring together students of schools from all over the state to participate in sports, literary and cultural competitions and showcase their talents.

=== V-Ignite ===
V-Ignite, a newsletter from Vignan Vidyalayas, is the only newsletter published by students of Vignan. It is described as of the students, by the students and for the students. It contains information of the events taking place in Vignan Group of Schools.

== Facilities ==
- Vignan's library has a good collection of books on various topics and subjects, in addition to the magazines and periodicals, daily newspapers and a wide range of reference books, to suit the reading tastes of different age groups of children.
- E-Class facility helps students to visualize content easily. Vignan got the entire syllabus from Next Education India Pvt. Ltd. (Teach Next), one of the leading content providers in India, to make the classroom instruction more effective and enjoyable.
- Vignan provides its students with good lab facilities including computer labs.
- Hostel rooms are well ventilated and hygienic. Students are groomed in dining etiquette, eating and sharing in groups, avoiding food wastage and so on when they sit for their meals in the common dining hall. A mineral water plant provides purified water to students. Solar heating facilities enable hygienic cooking besides providing students with hot water for bathing.
- Vignan's sprawling grounds facilitate playing tennis, skating, volleyball, throw ball, basketball, hockey, karate, tae-kwon-do, kabbadi, badminton, kho-kho, cricket, yoga, shot put, sprint, long jump, and disc throw. There is a separate playfield for pre-primary children.
- Art, painting, craft, dance and music. Students are encouraged to join in different student clubs and participate in activities like painting and other fine arts, soft-toy making, literary activities, and gardening.

== Notable alumni ==
- Hari Krishna Pentala
- Junior NTR
- K. T. Rama Rao
- Lavu Sri Krishna Devarayalu
- Kinjarapu Atchannaidu
- Anil Ravipudi
- Nara Rohith
- Pradeep Machiraju
- Priyadarshi Pulikonda
