= Roda Mistry =

Indian politician

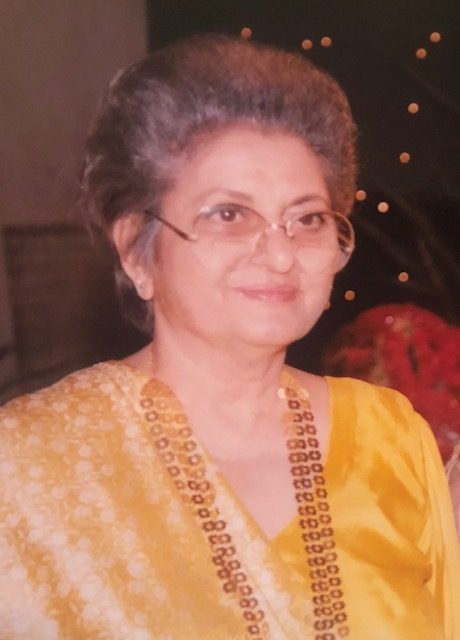
- Roda H. Mistry (Family photo, taken 29 Feb. 1996)

Member of Parliament, Rajya Sabha
- In office 1980–1986
- Constituency: Andhra Pradesh

Minister for Women and Child Welfare of Andhra Pradesh
- In office 1970s

Minister of Tourism of Andhra Pradesh

Personal details
- Born: 16 October 1928 India
- Died: 8 June 2004 (aged 75) Hyderabad, India
- Party: Indian National Congress
- Spouse: Homi P Mistry (m. 1946; died 2001)
- Children: 2

Roda Homi Mistry (16 October 1928 – 8 June 2004) was an Indian politician and the founder of the Roda Mistry College of Social Work and Research Center in Gachibowli, Hyderabad, India. She was a Member of Parliament, representing Andhra Pradesh in the Rajya Sabha the upper house of India's Parliament representing the Indian National Congress. She was earlier the Minister for Women and Child Welfare and the Minister of Tourism in the Andhra Pradesh state government. She died on 8 July 2006 in Hyderabad, India. She was Zoroastrian. Her granddaughter, Lylah M. Alphonse, is a U.S. journalist and the author of "Triumph Over Discrimination: The Life Story of Dr. Farhang Mehr."
