= CHIREC International =

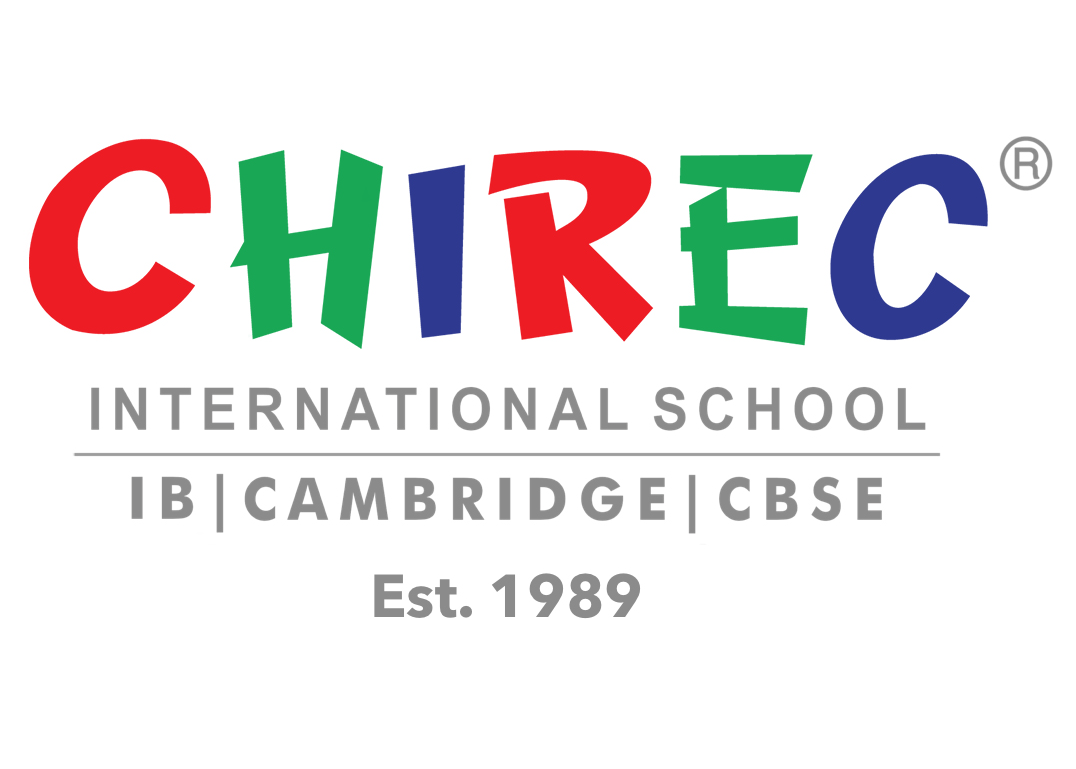

Location
- Telangana: Hyderabad; India; 17.4630°N 78.3519°E

Information
- Type: International School
- Motto: "Setting trends in Education since 1989"
- Established: March 1989
- Founder: Ratna Reddy
- School district: Hyderabad
- Principal: Sanchita Raha, Katyayini VKLT
- Faculty: 484
- Grades: Pre-primary to Grade 12
- Campus type: Urban, 6.0 acres (24,000 m^{2})
- Colors: Red, Green, Blue
- Affiliation: CBSE, IBDP, CAIE
- CEO: Peter McLaughlin
- Principal Emeritus: Iffat Ibrahim
- Website: chirec.ac.in | cognita.com

CHIREC International is a K–12 school in Hyderabad, in the Indian state of Telangana.

CHIREC has four campuses. The main campus is located in Kondapur, a Pre-Primary campus in Jubilee Hills, another in Gachibowli with Pre-Primary–Class 4 and another in Seringampally. The school offers three curricula: the International Baccalaureate Diploma Programme (IBDP), Cambridge Assessment International Education (CAIE) and Central Board of Secondary Education (CBSE).

== History ==
It was founded in 1989 by Ratna D. Reddy.

In April 1989, the Children's Recreational Centre (CHIREC) was founded as a summer camp that offered classes in fine arts, performing arts, computer science, and sports. That June, CHIREC became a school for Nursery, PP-I, and PP-II students.

In 1996, then-Chief Minister of Andhra Pradesh, N. Chandrababu Naidu, inaugurated CHIREC's eco-friendly integrated campus at Kondapur. In 2004, CHIREC unveiled its Jubilee Hills Pre-Primary school campus and introduced Senior Secondary classes at the Kondapur campus.

In 2008, the Cambridge International Primary Programme (CIPP) was introduced to the curriculum. The International General Certificate of Education A/AS levels for Classes 10 and 12 were introduced three years later. In 2012, CHIREC gained authorization for the International Baccalaureate Diploma Programme.

The Gachibowli campus was inaugurated in 2012.

In 2019, CHIREC partnered with Cognita, a global schools group with 76 schools across Asia, Europe, and Latin America.

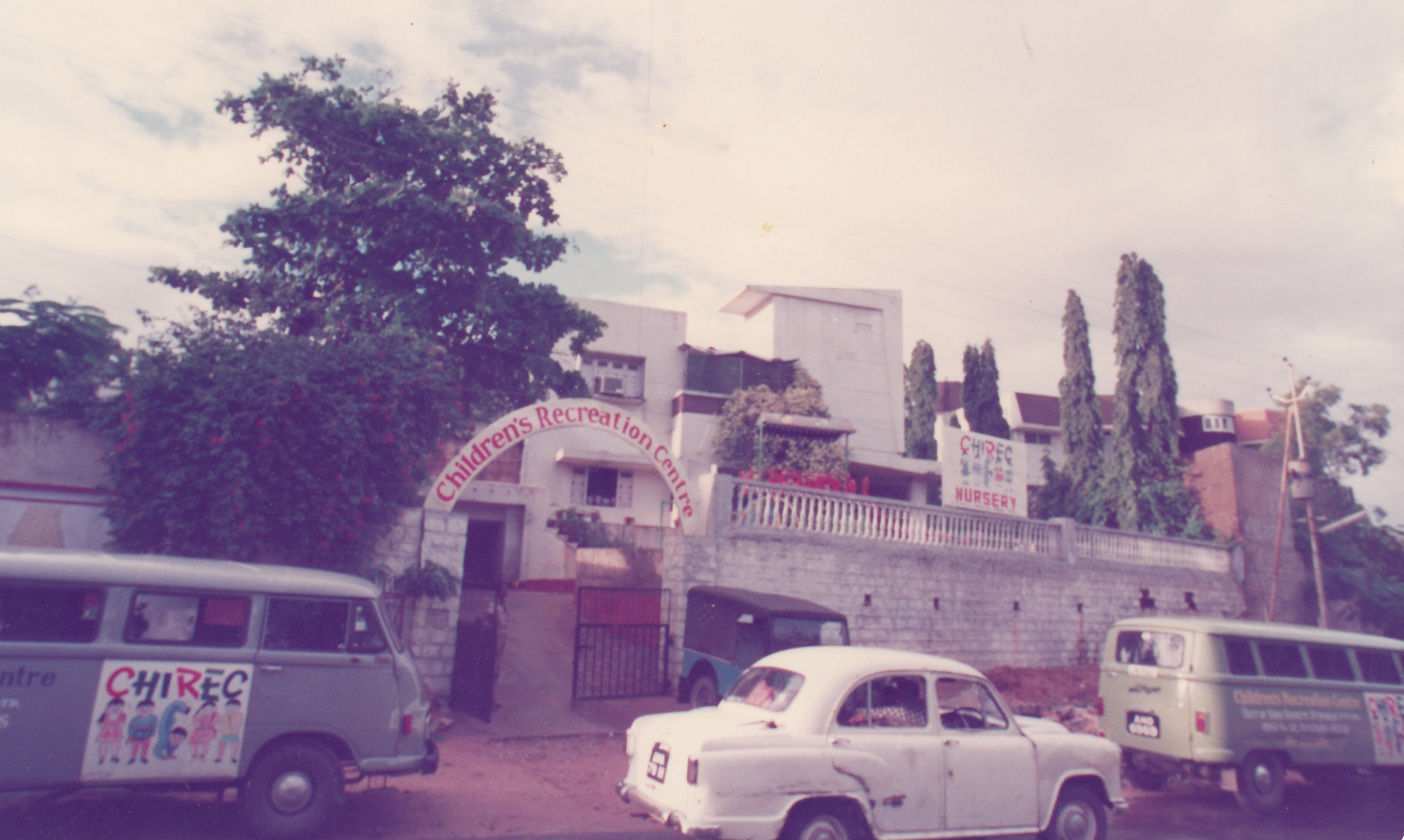
CHIREC Nursery School, 1989

== Campuses ==
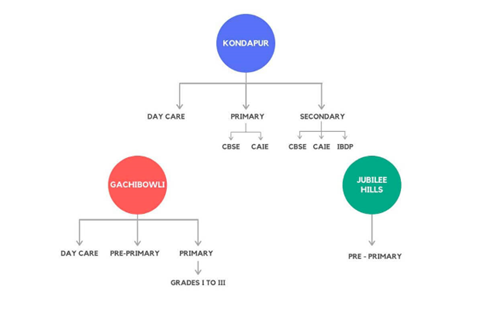

CHIREC International has four campuses, in Kondapur (main campus), Jubilee Hills, and two in Gachibowli. The campuses generate solar power, and use recycling and resource management.

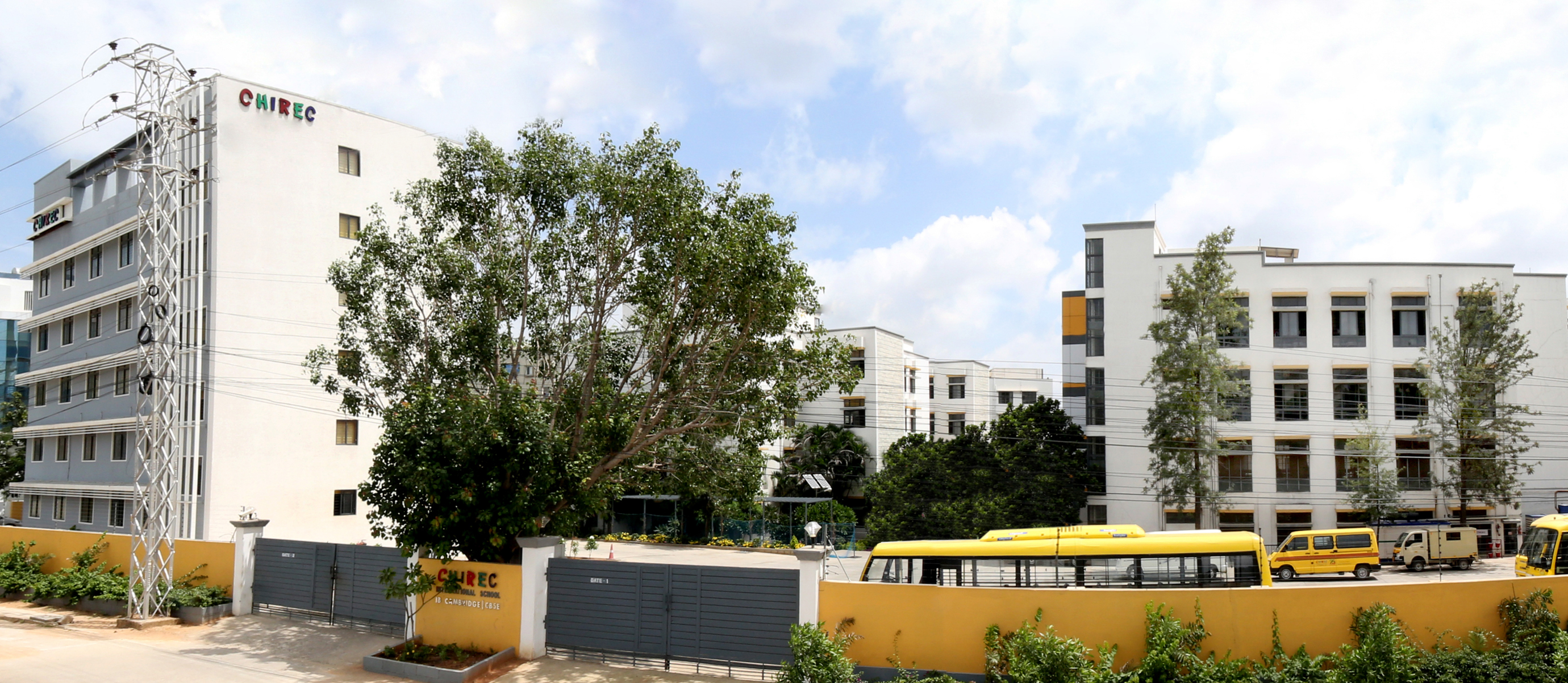
Kondapur Campus

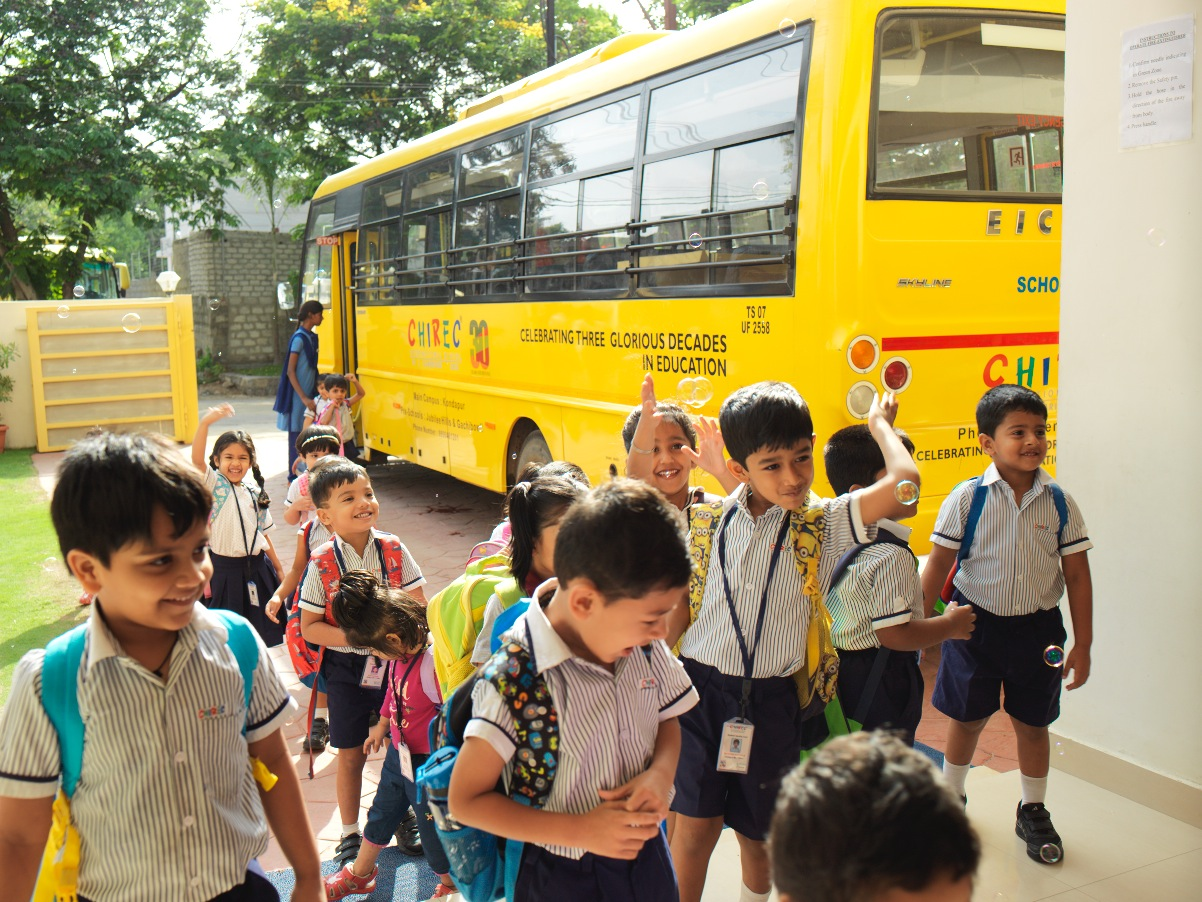
Jubilee Hills Campus

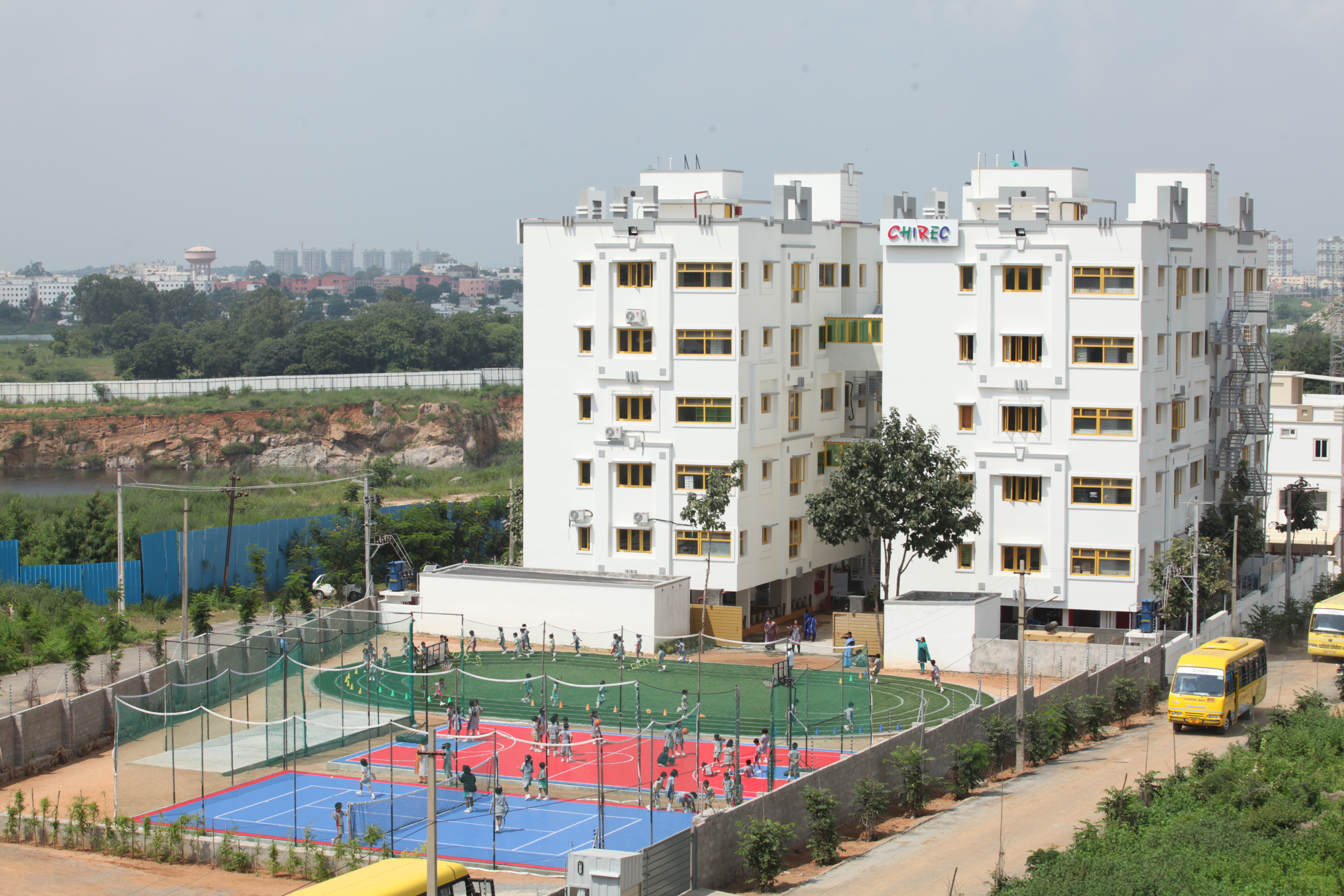
Gachibowli Campus
