= List of educational institutions in Hyderabad =

Indian School of Business entrance

This is a list of educational and research institutions in Hyderabad, Telangana, India.

== Universities and central institutions ==
- Osmania University
- Indian Institute of Technology Hyderabad
- Footwear Design and Development Institute

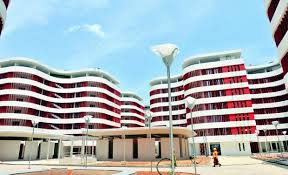
Hostels in IIT Hyderabad

- Tata Institute of Fundamental Research
- Birla Institute of Technology and Science, Pilani
- English and Foreign Languages University

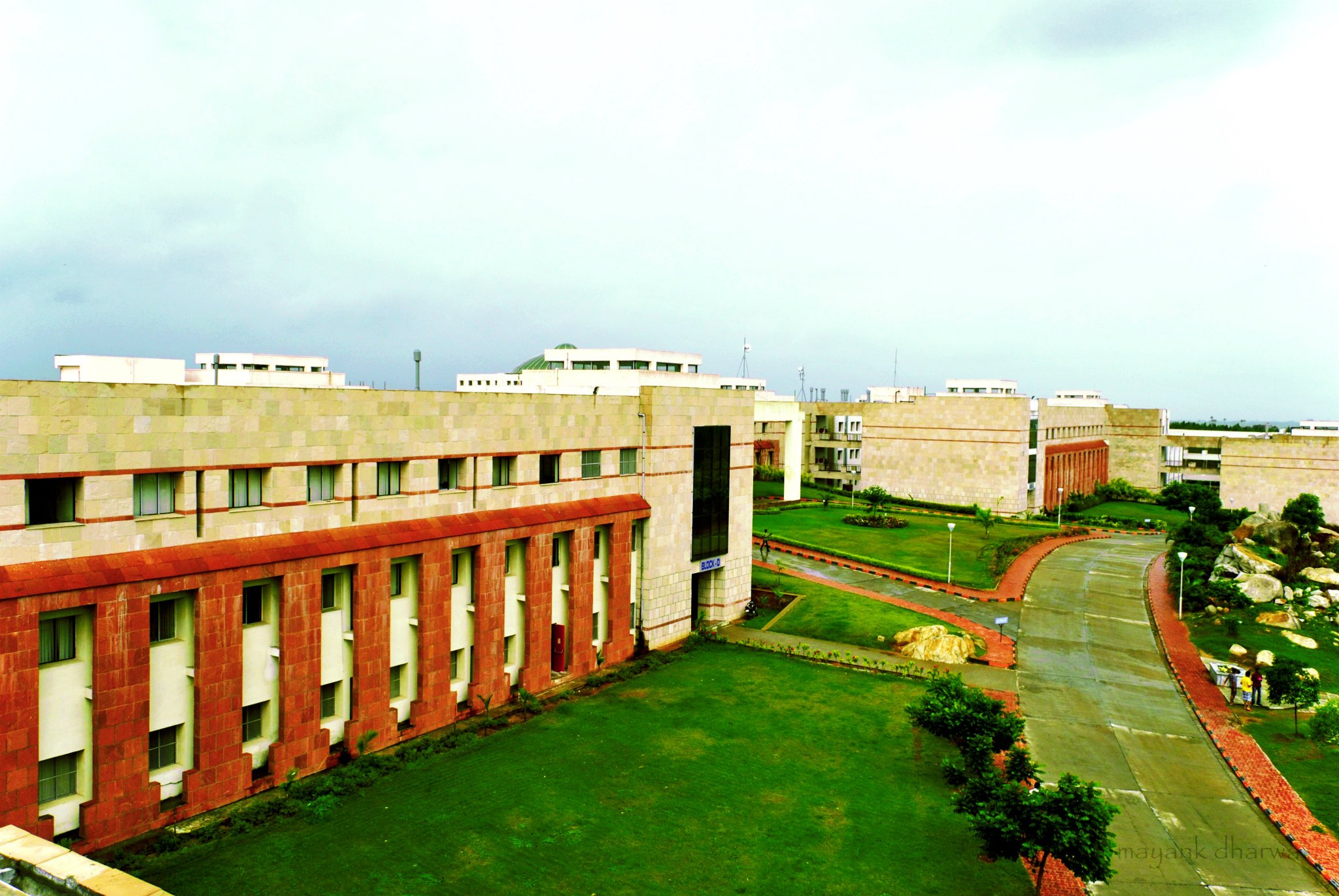
BITS Pilani, Hyderabad

- International Institute of Information Technology, Hyderabad
- Jawaharlal Nehru Technological University
- NALSAR University of Law
- Professor Jayashankar Telangana State Agricultural University
- Dr. B.R. Ambedkar Open University
- Tata Institute of Social Sciences, Hyderabad
- Indian School of Business
- Woxsen School of Business
- Ellenki Institute of Engineering and Technology
- Maulana Azad National Urdu University
- Nizam's Institute of Medical Sciences, Hyderabad
- GITAM University Hyderabad Campus
- Suravaram Pratap Reddy Telugu University
- Institute of Chartered Financial Analysts of India
- Mahindra University
- University of Hyderabad
- Woxsen University
- Symbosis International University
- Anurag University
- Malla Reddy University

== Centres and institutes ==
- Administrative Staff College of India
- Atomic Minerals Directorate for Exploration and Research, Hyderabad
- Bharat Dynamics Limited
- Birla Institute of Technology and Science, Pilani – Hyderabad
- Central Forensic Science Laboratory, Hyderabad
- Central Institute of Medicinal and Aromatic Plants
- Central Institute of Tool Design, Hyderabad
- Central Power Research Institute
- Central Research Institute for Dryland Agriculture (CRIDA), ICAR, Hyderabad
- Centre for Cellular and Molecular Biology (CCMB), Hyderabad
- Centre for Economic and Social Studies (CESS), Hyderabad
- Centre for High Energy Systems and Sciences (CHESS), Hyderabad
- Centre for Development of Advanced Computing
- Centre for DNA Fingerprinting and Diagnostics (CDFD), Hyderabad
- CR Rao Advanced Institute of Mathematics, Statistics and Computer Science
- Defence Metallurgical Research Laboratory (DMRL), Hyderabad
- Defence Research & Development Laboratory (DRDL)
- Defence Research Development Organization (DRDO), Hyderabad
  - Advanced Systems Laboratory
  - Advanced Numerical Research and Analysis Group
  - Research Centre Imarat
- Directorate of Poultry Research (DPR), ICAR, Hyderabad
- Directorate of Rice Research (DRR), ICAR, Hyderabad
- Dr. Marri Channa Reddy Human Resource Development Institute of Telangana
- Electronics Corporation of India Limited (ECIL), Hyderabad
- Footwear Design and Development Institute
- Forest College and Research Institute (FCRI), Hyderabad
- Genome Valley
- Hyderabad Pharma City
- Indian Immunologicals Limited
- Indian Institute of Chemical Technology (IICT), Hyderabad
- Indian Institute of Millets Research (IIMR), ICAR, Hyderabad
- Indian Institute of Oilseeds Research (DOR), ICAR, Hyderabad
- Indian Institute of Packaging, Hyderabad
- Indian Institute of Technology Hyderabad,
- Indian National Centre for Ocean Information Services, Hyderabad
- Indian School of Business (ISB), Hyderabad
- Indian Statistical Institute
- International School of Engineering
- Institute for Development and Research in Banking Technology
- Institute of Forest Biodiversity
- Institute of Genetics and Hospital for Genetic Diseases
- Institute of Indian Medical Coding, Hyderabad
- Institute of Public Enterprise
- International Crops Research Institute for the Semi-Arid Tropics (ICRISAT), Hyderabad
- International Institute of Information Technology, Hyderabad,
- National Academy of Agricultural Research Management (NAARM), ICAR, Hyderabad
- National Academy of Construction, Hyderabad
- National Animal Resource Facility for Biomedical Research
- National Balloon Facility
- National Bureau of Plant Genetic Resources (NBPGR), ICAR, Hyderabad
- National Environmental Engineering Research Institute (NEER), Hyderabad
- National Geophysical Research Institute (NGRI), Hyderabad
- National Institute of Agricultural Extension Management (MANAGE), Hyderabad
- National Institute of Animal Biotechnology
- National Institute of Fashion Technology, Hyderabad
- National Institute of Indian Medical Heritage
- National Institute of Nutrition (NIN), Tarnaka, Hyderabad
- National Institute of Micro, Small and Medium Enterprises, Hyderabad
- National Institute of Pharmaceutical Education and Research, Hyderabad
- National Institute of Plant Health Management (NIPHM), Hyderabad
- National Institute of Rural Development (NIRD)
- National Institute of Technology, Warangal (Warangal),
- National Institute of Tourism and Hospitality Management
- National Police Academy
- National Remote Sensing Agency
- National Research Centre on Meat (NRCM), ICAR, Hyderabad
- National Security Guard
- National Small Industries Corporation
- NIPER Hyderabad
- Nizam's Institute of Medical Sciences
- Nuclear Fuel Complex (NFC)
- Programme Air Defence (PGAD)
- Research Centre Imarat (RCI)
- Tata Institute of Fundamental Research Hyderabad
- Tata Institute of Social Sciences, Hyderabad
- TCS Innovation Lab, Hyderabad
- The Indian Institute of Cosmetology, Aesthetics, and Nutrition (I2CAN)

== Private colleges ==
=== Engineering ===
- Chaitanya Bharathi Institute of Technology
- CMR Institute of Technology, Hyderabad
- CVR College of Engineering
- CVSR College of Engineering
- Deccan College of Engineering and Technology
- Ellenki College of Engineering and Technology
- Gokaraju Rangaraju Institute of Engineering Technology
- International School of Engineering
- Institute Of Aeronautical Engineering
- J. B. Institute of Engineering and Technology
- Keshav Memorial Institute of Technology
- Mahatma Gandhi Institute of Technology
- Malla Reddy Engineering College
- Lords Institute of Engineering and Technology
- Malla Reddy College of Engineering and Technology
- MLR Institute of Technology
- Maturi Venkata Subba Rao Engineering College
- Methodist College of Engineering and Technology
- Muffakham Jah College of Engineering and Technology
- Padmasri Dr. B.V Raju Institute of Technology
- Sreenidhi Institute of Science and Technology
- TRR College of Engineering
- Vardhaman College of Engineering
- Vasavi College of Engineering
- Vidya Jyothi Institute of Technology
- Vignan Institute of Technology and Aeronautical Engineering
- Vignana Bharathi Institute of Technology
- VNR Vignana Jyothi Institute of Engineering and Technology

=== Design ===
- ICAT Design & Media College, Hyderabad *
- Footwear Design and Development Institute*

=== Medicine ===
- Deccan College of Medical Sciences
- Kamineni Institute of Medical Sciences
- Nizams Institute of Medical Sciences
- Osmania Medical College
- Shadan Institute of Medical Sciences
- Mallareddy Medical College for Women's
- Mallareddy Institute of Medical Sciences
- Mallareddy Dental College for Women's
- Mallareddy Institute of Dental Sciences
- Panineeya Institute of Dental Sciences

== Other degree colleges ==
- Andhra Vidyalaya College of Arts, Science and Commerce
- Bhavans Vivekananda College
- City College Hyderabad
- Nizam College
- Tapasya College of Commerce and Management
- Wesley Degree College, Secunderabad
- Avinash College of Commerce
- Loyola Academy Degree And PG College

== Schools ==
- Meru International School
- Jubliee Hills Public School
- Aga Khan Academy
- All Saints High School
- Bharatiya Vidya Bhavan Public School
- D.A.V. Public School
- Dr. S. Hussain Zaheer Memorial High School
- Gitanjali Senior School
- Glendale Academy
- Global Indian International School
- Gowtham Model School
- Hyderabad Public School
- Indus International School
- Johnson Grammar School
- Little Flower High School

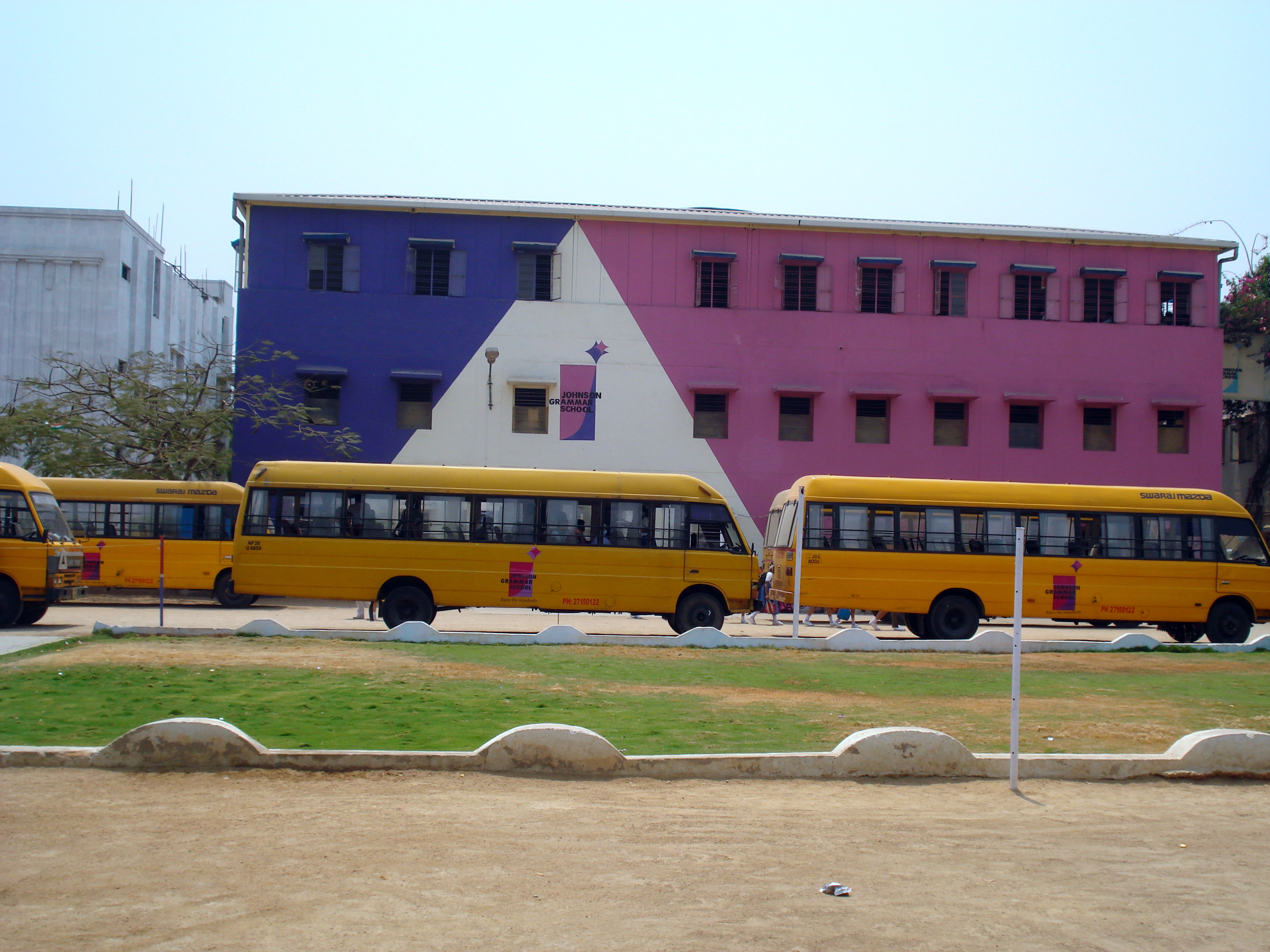
Johnson Grammar School

- Meridian School
- Nasr School
- Oakridge International School
- Oxford Grammar School
- Rosary Convent High School
- Sanskriti School
- Sri Aurobindo International School
- Stanley Girls High School
- St. George's Grammar School
- St. Paul's High School
- Vidyaranya High School
- Sri Vidyaranya International School, Sri Shardadham, Bandlaguda Jagir, Hyderabad
- Walden's Path

== Intermediate Colleges ==
- CMS Junior College

== See also ==
- Education in India
- Education in Hyderabad
- List of business schools in Hyderabad, India
