= List of educational institutions in Telangana =

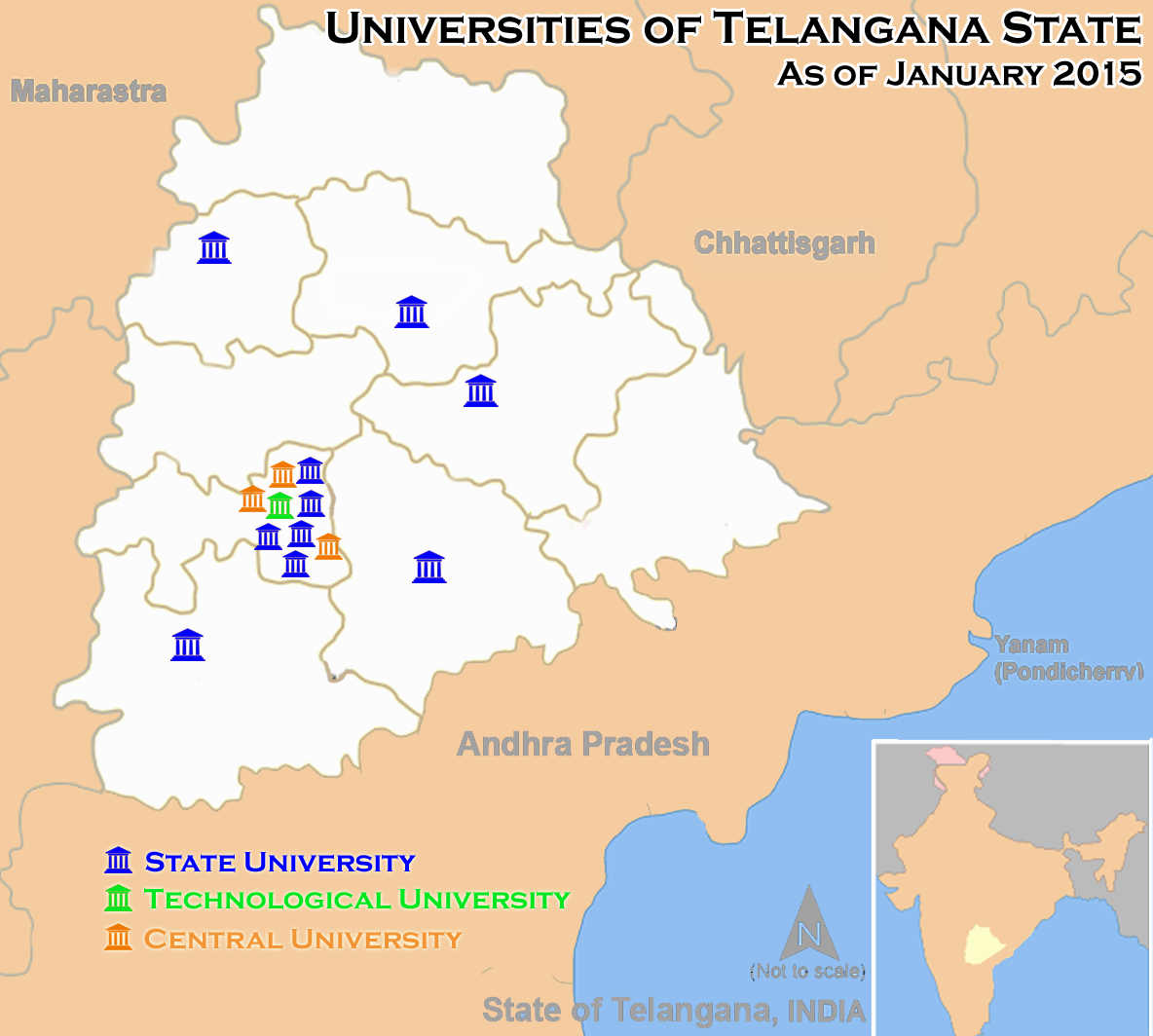
Map of the universities in Telangana, January 2015 (click to enlarge)

There are 28 universities in Telangana, a state in the southern part of India. Of these, there are 17 state universities, three deemed universities, three central and five private universities. Five more private universities (Sreeniddhi, Gurunanak, MNR, NICMAR, and Kaveri) have been approved since the year 2024, details of which are available on TGCHE website (https://tgche.ac.in/private-universities/). The Osmania University is the largest in the state. It is also the oldest university in the state, established in 1918.

There are also research institutes, medical and engineering colleges, etc. These include four institutes of national importance, which are the AIIMS Bibinagar, IIT Hyderabad, NIPER Hyderabad, and NIT Warangal.

== Universities ==
Universities of Telangana
University	Location	Type	Established	Specialization	Sources
Anurag University	Hyderabad	Private	2020	General	
Chaitanya Deemed to be University	Warangal	Deemed	1991 (2019)	UG, PG, Engg, Pharmacy	
Dr. B. R. Ambedkar Open University	Hyderabad	State	1982	General	
English and Foreign Languages University	Hyderabad	Central	1958 (2007)	Language	
International Institute of Information Technology	Hyderabad	Deemed	1998	Technical	
Institute of Chartered Financial Analysts of India	Hyderabad	Deemed	1984	General	
Jawaharlal Nehru Technological University	Hyderabad	State	1972	General	
Jawaharlal Nehru Architecture and Fine Arts University	Hyderabad	State	2008	Architecture and Fine Arts	
Kakatiya University	Warangal	State	1976	General	
Kaloji Narayana Rao University of Health Sciences	Warangal	State	2014	Health care	
Mahatma Gandhi University, Nalgonda	Nalgonda	State	2007	General	
Mahindra University	Hyderabad	Private	2020		
Maulana Azad National Urdu University	Hyderabad	Central	1998	Language	
Nalsar University of Law	Hyderabad	State	1998	Law	
Osmania University	Hyderabad	State	1918	General	
Palamuru University	Mahbubnagar	State	2008	General	
Professor Jayashankar Telangana State Agricultural University	Hyderabad	State	2014	Agricultural	
P. V. Narasimha Rao Telangana Veterinary University	Hyderabad	State	2014	Veterinary	
Rajiv Gandhi University of Knowledge Technologies	Basar, Telangana	State	2008	Technical	
Satavahana University	Karimnagar	State	2006	General	
Sri Konda Laxman Telangana State Horticultural University	Hyderabad	State	2014	Horticulture	
Telangana University	Nizamabad	State	2006	General	
SR University	Warangal	Private	2002	General	
Suravaram Pratap Reddy Telugu University	Hyderabad	State	1985	Cultural	
University of Hyderabad	Hyderabad	Central	1974	General	
Woxsen University	Hyderabad	Private	2014	General	

== Out-of-state universities ==
- Birla Institute of Technology & Science, Pilani (deemed, Rajasthan) has a campus in Hyderabad.
- Gandhi Institute of Technology and Management (GITAM) (deemed, Andhra Pradesh) has a campus in Hyderabad.
- Tata Institute of Fundamental Research (deemed, Maharashtra) has a campus in Hyderabad
- Tata Institute of Social Sciences (deemed, Maharashtra) has a campus in Hyderabad.

== Major educational and research institutes ==
=== Institutes of National Importance ===
Name	Location
All India Institute of Medical Sciences, Bibinagar	Bibinagar
Indian Institute of Technology Hyderabad	Hyderabad
National Institute of Technology, Warangal	Warangal
National Institute of Pharmaceutical Education and Research, Hyderabad	Hyderabad

=== Other Institutes ===
- Administrative Staff College of India
- Atomic Minerals Directorate for Exploration and Research, Hyderabad
- Bharat Dynamics Limited
- Birla Institute of Technology and Science, Pilani – Hyderabad
- Central Forensic Science Laboratory, Hyderabad
- Central Institute of Medicinal and Aromatic Plants
- Central Institute of Tool Design, Hyderabad
- Central Power Research Institute
- Central Research Institute for Dryland Agriculture (CRIDA), ICAR, Hyderabad
- Centre for Cellular and Molecular Biology (CCMB), Hyderabad
- Centre for Economic and Social Studies (CESS), Hyderabad
- Centre for High Energy Systems and Sciences (CHESS), Hyderabad
- Centre for Development of Advanced Computing
- Centre for DNA Fingerprinting and Diagnostics (CDFD), Hyderabad
- CR Rao Advanced Institute of Mathematics, Statistics and Computer Science
- Defence Metallurgical Research Laboratory (DMRL), Hyderabad
- Defence Research & Development Laboratory (DRDL)
- Defence Research Development Organization (DRDO), Hyderabad
  - Advanced Systems Laboratory
  - Advanced Numerical Research and Analysis Group
  - Research Centre Imarat
- Directorate of Poultry Research (DPR), ICAR, Hyderabad
- Directorate of Rice Research (DRR), ICAR, Hyderabad
- Dr. Marri Channa Reddy Human Resource Development Institute of Telangana
- Electronics Corporation of India Limited (ECIL), Hyderabad
- Footwear Design and Development Institute
- Forest College and Research Institute (FCRI), Hyderabad
- Genome Valley
- Hyderabad Pharma City
- Indian Immunologicals Limited
- Indian Institute of Chemical Technology (IICT), Hyderabad
- Indian Institute of Millets Research (IIMR), ICAR, Hyderabad
- Indian Institute of Oilseeds Research (DOR), ICAR, Hyderabad
- Indian Institute of Packaging, Hyderabad
- Indian Institute of Technology Hyderabad,
- Indian National Centre for Ocean Information Services, Hyderabad
- Indian School of Business (ISB), Hyderabad
- Indian Statistical Institute
- International School of Engineering
- Institute for Development and Research in Banking Technology
- Institute of Forest Biodiversity
- Institute of Genetics and Hospital for Genetic Diseases
- Institute of Public Enterprise
- International Crops Research Institute for the Semi-Arid Tropics (ICRISAT), Hyderabad
- International Institute of Information Technology, Hyderabad,
- National Academy of Agricultural Research Management (NAARM), ICAR, Hyderabad
- National Academy of Construction, Hyderabad
- National Animal Resource Facility for Biomedical Research
- National Balloon Facility
- National Bureau of Plant Genetic Resources (NBPGR), ICAR, Hyderabad
- National Environmental Engineering Research Institute (NEER), Hyderabad
- National Geophysical Research Institute (NGRI), Hyderabad
- National Institute of Agricultural Extension Management (MANAGE), Hyderabad
- National Institute of Animal Biotechnology
- National Institute of Fashion Technology, Hyderabad
- National Institute of Indian Medical Heritage
- National Institute of Nutrition (NIN), Tarnaka, Hyderabad
- National Institute of Micro, Small and Medium Enterprises, Hyderabad
- National Institute of Pharmaceutical Education and Research, Hyderabad
- National Institute of Plant Health Management (NIPHM), Hyderabad
- National Institute of Rural Development (NIRD)
- National Institute of Technology, Warangal (Warangal),
- National Institute of Tourism and Hospitality Management
- National Police Academy
- National Remote Sensing Agency
- National Research Centre on Meat (NRCM), ICAR, Hyderabad
- National Security Guard
- National Small Industries Corporation
- NIPER Hyderabad
- Nizam's Institute of Medical Sciences
- Nuclear Fuel Complex (NFC)
- Programme Air Defence (PGAD)
- Research Centre Imarat (RCI)
- Tata Institute of Fundamental Research Hyderabad
- Tata Institute of Social Sciences, Hyderabad
- TCS Innovation Lab, Hyderabad
- The Indian Institute of Cosmetology, Aesthetics, and Nutrition (I2CAN)

== Medical colleges and research institutes ==
Telangana State has 8,515 MBBS seats for academic year 2023-24.

=== Government colleges ===
3915 seats are available in Government Colleges:

- Osmania Medical College, Koti, Hyderabad
- Gandhi Medical College, Musheerabad, Hyderabad
- Kakatiya Medical College, Warangal
- Rajiv Gandhi Institute of Medical Sciences, Adilabad
- Government Medical College, Nizamabad
- Government Medical College, Mahbubnagar,
- Government Medical College, Siddipet
- Government Medical College, Sangareddy
- Government Medical College, Karimnagar
- Government Medical College, Suryapet
- Government Medical College, Jagtiyal
- Government Medical College Nalgonda
- Government Medical College, Mancherial
- All India Institute of Medical Sciences, Bibinagar
- ESI Medical College, Sanathnagar, Hyderabad

=== Private colleges ===
4600 seats are available in private colleges.

=== Private Un aided Non Minority Medical Colleges ===
- Mamatha Medical College, Khammam.
- Kamineni Institute of Medical Sciences, Narketpally, Nalgonda.
- S.V.S. Medical College, Yenugonda, Mahaboobnagar.
- Chalmeda Anand Rao Institute of Medical Sciences, Karimnagar.
- Prathima Institute of Medical Sciences, Narketpally, Karimnagar.
- Medicity Institute of Medical Sciences, Ghanpur, R.R. Dist.
- MNR Medical College and Hospital, Fasalwadi Sangareddy, Medak Dist.
- Bhaskar Medical College, Moinabad (M), R.R.Dist.
- Apollo Institute of Medical sciences and Research, Hyderabad.
- Kamineni Academy of Medical Sciences and Research Centre, LB Nagar, Hyderabad.
- RVM Medical College, Mulugu, Medak
- RVM Institute of Medical Sciences and Research Centre, Siddipet
- Surabhi Institute of Medical Sciences, Siddipet.
- Mamata Academy of Medical Sciences, Bachupally.
- Malla Reddy Institute of Medical Sciences, Hyderabad.
- Malla Reddy Medical College for Women's, Hyderabad.
- Mahavir Institute of Medical Sciences, Vikarabad.
- Dr.Patnam Mahendar Reddy Institute of Medical Sciences, Chevella, R.R.
- Maheshwara Medical College, Patancheru-Not permitted for 2019-20.

=== Private Un aided Minority Medical Colleges ===
- Deccan College of Medical Sciences, Hyderabad.
- Shadan Institute Of Medical Sciences, Hyderabad.
- Dr.VRK Woman’s Medical College, Aziz Nagar, Hyderabad.
- Ayaan Institute of Medical Sciences, Teaching Hospital and Research Centre, Kanaka Mamidi, R.R.Dist.

== Engineering colleges ==
Short Name	Full Name	Website	! Est. Year	Affiliated University	Revenue Division	District	Ownership	Additional information
jits	Jayamukhi Institute of Technological Sciences	https://www.jits.in	2001	Autonomous JNTUH, Hyderbad	Narsampet	warangal	private	Eamcet Code:jAYA
Mrits	Malla Reddy institution of technology and science	https://www.mrits.ac.in	2005	JNTU, Hyderabad	Masimmagudha, Dhulapally	Medchal-Malkajgiri	[Private]	
VNR VJIET	VNR Vignana Jyothi Institute of Engineering and Technology	http://www.vnrvjiet.ac.in/	1995	Autonomous	Hyderabad	Medchal-Malkajgiri	Private	
MGIT	Mahatma Gandhi Institute of Technology	http://www.mgit.ac.in/	1997	JNTU, Hyderabad	Gandipet	Rangareddy	Private	
ECET	Ellenki College of Engineering and Technology	https://ellenkicet.ac.in/	1999	Autonomous	Patancheru	Rangareddy	Private	Eamcet Code : ELEN
RGUKT-Basar	Rajiv Gandhi University of Knowledge Technologies	http://www.rgukt.ac.in/	2008	Autonomous	Basar	Nirmal	Public	
VBIT	Vignana Bharathi Institute of Technology	http://vbithyd.ac.in//	2004	Autonomous	Ghatkesar	Medchal-Malkajgiri	[Private]	
AURP	Aurora Group of Institutions	http://www.aurora.in/	1989	JNTU, Hyderabad	Ghatkesar	Medchal-Malkajgiri	[Private]	
GCET	Geethanjali College of Engineering and Technology	http://www.geethanjaliinstitutions.com/engineering/	2005	Autonomous	Cheeryal Village, Keesara Mandal,	Medchal-Malkajgiri	[Private]	
HITS	Holy mary institute of technology	http://www.hits.ac.in/		JNTU, Hyderabad	Bogaram	Medchal-Malkajgiri	[Private]	
VMTW	Vignan Institute of management and technology For Women	http://www.vmtw.in/	2008	JNTU, Hyderabad	Ghatkesar	Medchal-Malkajgiri	[Private]	
SMSK1	Samskruti college of Engineering and Technology	http://samskruti.ac.in/engineering/]		JNTU, Hyderabad	Bogaram	Medchal-Malkajgiri	[Private]	
PETW	Princeton Institute of engineering and technology	http://petw.co.in/	2004	JNTU, Hyderabad	Ghatkesar	Medchal-Malkajgiri	[Private]	
CVSR	Anurag Group of Institutions	https://anurag.edu.in/	2002	Autonomous	Venkatapur	Medchal-Malkajgiri	[Private]	
SNIST	sreenidhi institute of science and technology	http://www.sreenidhi.edu.in/	1998	Autonomous	Yamnapet, Ghatkesar	Medchal-Malkajgiri	[Private]	
KPRIT	Kommuri pratap reddy institute of technology	https://www.kpritech.ac.in/	2008	JNTU, Hyderabad	Ghanpur, Ghatkesar	Medchal-Malkajgiri	[Private]	
VBIT	Vignana Bharathi Institute of technology	nnrg.edu.in	2009	JNTU, Hyderabad	Korremulla	Medchal-Malkajgiri	[Private]	
NMREC	Nalla Malla Reddy Engineering College	http://www.nmrec.edu.in/	2001	Autonomous College, Hyderabad	Ghatkesar	Medchal-Malkajgiri	[Private]	Quality Education with all round development
MGHA	Megha Institute of Engineering and Technology for Women	http://www.meghaengg.co.in/	2008	Autonomous Institution JNTU, Hyderabad	Ghatkesar	Medchal-Malkajgiri	[Private]	Accredited by NAAC 'A' Grade
BITS	BITS-Pilani, Hyderabad	http://www.bits-pilani.ac.in/Hyderabad/index.aspx	2008	BITS, Pilani	Shameerpet	Medchal-Malkajgiri	Private	
IITH	Indian Institute of Technology	https://www.iith.ac.in/	2008	Autonomous	Hyderabad	Sangareddy	Public	
IIITH	International Institute of Information Technology	https://www.iiit.ac.in/	1998	Autonomous	Hyderabad	Ranga Reddy	Public	
JNTU	Jawaharlal Nehru Technological University	http://jntuh.ac.in/	1972	University	Kukatpally	Medchal–Malkajgiri	Public	
NITW	National Institute of Technology	https://www.nitw.ac.in/main/	1959	Autonomous	Warangal	Warangal(Urban)	Public	
KU	Kakatiya University	http://kakatiya.ac.in/	1976	University	Warangal	Warangal(Urban)	Public	
OU	Osmania University	http://www.uceou.edu/	1918	University	Hyderabad	Hyderabad	Public	
DVRCET	DVR College of Engineering and Technology	http://dvrcet.ac.in/	1997	JNTU, Hyderabad	Kandi	Sangareddy	Private	
KITS	Kakatiya Institute of Technology and Science	http://www.kitsw.ac.in/	1980	Autonomous	Warangal	Warangal(Urban)	Private	
GITAM	Gandhi Institute of Technology and Management	http://www.gitam.edu/campus/hyderabad-campus	2008	Deemed University	Rudraram	Sangareddy	Private	
MNRCET	MNR College of Engineering and Technology	http://mnrcet.mnrindia.org/	2008	JNTU, Hyderabad	Kandi	Sangareddy	Private	
CBIT	Chaitanya Bharathi Institute of Technology	http://www.cbit.ac.in/	1979	Autonomous	Gandipet	Rangareddy	Private	
MLRIT	MLR Institute of Technology	http://www.mlrinstitutions.ac.in/	2005	Autonomous	Hyderabad	Medchal-Malkajgiri	Private	
SWEC	Sridevi Women's Engineering College	http://www.swec.ac.in/	2001 - Code-SDEW	Autonomous	Vattinagulapally	Rangareddy	Private	Women only
VCE	Vasavi College of Engineering	http://www.vce.ac.in/	1981	Autonomous	Ibrahimbagh	Rangareddy	Private	
BSIT	Bandari Srinivas Institute of Technology		2003	JNTU, Hyderabad	Chevella	Rangareddy	Private	
KGRH	KG Reddy Engineering College	http://www.kgr.ac.in/	2008	JNTU, Hyderabad	Moinabad	Rangareddy	Private	
VMEG	Vardhaman College of Engineering	https://vardhaman.org/	1999	Autonomous	Kacharam	Rangareddy	Private	
SEST	School of Engineering Sciences and Technology, UoH		2008	University of Hyderabad	Gachibowli	Rangareddy	Public	
MVSR	Maturi Venkata Subba Rao Engineering College	https://mvsrec.edu.in/	1980	Autonomous	Nadargul	Rangareddy	Private	MVSR
ATRI	Aurora's Technological and Research Institute	http://www.atri.edu.in	1989	JNTUH	Uppal	Hyderabad	Private	
NMREC	Nalla Malla Reddy Engineering College		2001	JNTUH	Kachivani Singaram	Medchal-Malkajgiri	Private	
TRR	Tammannagari Ramakrishna Reddy College of Engineering		2002	JNTUH	Inole	Rangareddy	Private	
BRECW	Bhoj Reddy Engineering College for Women	http://www.brecw.ac.in	1997	JNTUH	Saidabad	Hyderabad	Private	Women only
DCET	Deccan College of Engineering and Technology	http://deccancollege.ac.in	1984	OU	Nampally	Hyderabad	Private	Muslim Minority
GNITS	G. Narayanamma Institute of Technology and Science	http://www.gnits.ac.in/	1997	AUTONOMOUS	Shaikpet	Hyderabad	Private	Women only
islengg	Islamia College of Engineering and Technology	https://islengg.ac.in	1981	OU	Bandlaguda	Hyderabad	Private	
KMIT	Keshav Memorial Institute of Technology	http://www.kmit.in/	2007	autonoums	Narayanguda	Hyderabad	Private	
MCET	Methodist College of Engineering and Technology	http://methodist.edu.in/	2008	OU	Abids	Hyderabad	Private	
SWCET	Shadan Women's College of Engineering and Technology	http://www.swcet.in	2002	JNTUH	Khairatabad	Hyderabad	Private	Muslim Minority, Women only
SCETW	Stanley College of Engineering and Technology for Women	http://stanley.edu.in/	2008	OU	Abids	Hyderabad	Private	Women only
INDU	Sri Indu College of Engineering and Technology	http://www.sriindugroup.org/newdesign/autonomous/?view=overview	2001	Autonomous	Ibrahmipatnam	Rangareddy	Private	
SDES	Sri Datta College of Engineering		2001	JNTUH	Ibrahmipatnam	Rangareddy	Private	
BIET	Bharath Institute of Science and Technology		2001	JNTUH	Ibrahmipatnam	Rangareddy	Private	
GNIT	Guru Nanak Institute of Technology			JNTUH	Ibrahmipatnam	Rangareddy	Private	
GURU	Guru Nanak Institutions Technical Campus	http://gniindia.org/gnitc/index.html	2001	Autonomous	Ibrahmipatnam	Rangareddy	Private	
SIT	SCIENT Institute of Technology	scient.ac.in	2001	JNTUH	Ibrahmipatnam	Rangareddy	Private	
TKREC	Teegala Krishna Reddy Engineering College		2005	JNTUH	Saroornagar	Rangareddy	Private	
TKRC	TKR College of Engineering and Technology	http://tkrcet.ac.in/	2002	Autonomous	Saroornagar	Rangareddy	Private	
MIST	Mahaveer Institute of Science and Technology	http://mist.ac.in/	2001	JNTUH	Bandlaguda	Hyderabad	Private	
VEC	Vaagdevi Engineering College		1998	JNTUH	Bollikunta	Warangal-Rural	Private	
VCE	Vaagdevi College of Engineering		1998	Autonomous	Bollikunta	Warangal-Rural	Private	
SRITW	Sumathi Reddy Institute of Technology for Women		2002	JNTUH	Ananthsagar, Hasanparthy	Warangal	Private	Women only
AARM	AAR Mahaveer Engineering College	http://aarm.ac.in	2010	JNTUH	Bandlaguda	Hyderabad	Private	Created Anjamma Agi Reddy Engineering College for Women in 2010; now coeducational
MJCET	Muffakam Jha College of Engineering and Technology	http://mjcollege.ac.in	1980	OU	Banjara hills	Hyderabad	Private	
PRIN	Princeton College of Engineering and Technology		2002	JNTUH	Ankushapur	Rangareddy	Private	
SCET	Shadan College of Engineering & Technology	scet.in	1995	JNTUH	Peeram Cheruvu	Rangareddy	Private	
MECS	Matrusri Engineering College	http://www.matrusri.edu.in	2011	JNTUH	Saidabad	Hyderabad	Private	
CVRH	CVR College of Engineering	http://cvr.ac.in/home4/	2000	Autonomous	Mangalpally	Rangareddy	Private	
NAWB	Nawab Shah Alam Khan College of Engineering and Technology	http://nsakcet.ac.in	1961	JNTUH	New Malakpet	Hyderabad	Private	Muslim Minority
SRYS	Sreyas Institute Of Engineering & Technology	http://sreyas.ac.in	2010	JNTUH	Bandlaguda	Hyderabad	Private	
JNTUH CES	JNTUH College of Engineering Sultanpur		2012	JNTU, Hyderabad	SULTANPUR	Sangareddy	Public	Constitute College of JNTUH
VJIT	Vidya Jyothi Institute of Science and Technology	https://vjit.ac.in/		Autonomous	Moinabad, Chevella	Rangareddy	Private	
	Abhinav Hi-Tech College of Engineering and Technology			JNTUH	Moinabad, Chevella	Rangareddy	Private	
	Joginpally B R Engineering College			JNTUH	Moinabad, Chevella	Rangareddy	Private	
JBIT	JB Institute of Engineering and Technology	https://www.jbiet.edu.in/		Autonomous	Moinabad, Chevella	Rangareddy	Private	
	Siddhartha Institute of Technology and Sciences			JNTUH	Ibrahmipatnam	Rangareddy	Private	
LIET	Lords Institute of Engineering and Technology	https://www.lords.ac.in/	2003	Autonomous	Rajendra Nagar	Rangareddy	Private	Muslim Minority
	AVN College of Engineering			JNTUH	Ibrahmipatnam	Rangareddy	Private	
	Visvesvaraya College of Engineering and Technology			JNTUH	Ibrahmipatnam	Rangareddy	Private	
JIET	Jagruti Institute of Engineering & Technology			JNTUH	Ibrahmipatnam	Rangareddy	Private	
GRIET	Gokraju Ranjaraju Institute of Engineering and Technology	http://www.griet.ac.in/	1997	Autonomous	Nizampet	Medchal-Malkajgiri	Private	
SMEC	St. Martins Engineering College	http://smec.ac.in//Home	2002	JNTUH	Dhulapally	Rangareddy	Private	
CMREC	CMR Engineering college	http://www.cmrec.ac.in	2010	JNTUH	kandlakoya	Medchal-Malkajgiri	private	
CMRTC	CMR Technical Campus	http://www.cmrtc.ac.in	Jntuh	Kandlakoya	Medchal	private		
MREC	Malla Reddy Engineering College	http://mrec.ac.in/	2002	Autonomous	Maisammaguda	Medchal-Malkajgiri	Private	
HITAM	Hyderabad Institute of Technology and Management	http://hitam.org	2001	JNTUH	Hyderabad	Medchal-Malkajgiri	Private	
CMRIT	CMR Institute Of Technology	https://www.cmritonline.ac.in/	2005	Autonomous	Kandlakoya	Medchal-Malkajgiri	Private	
CMRCET	CMR College Of Engineering & Technology	http://cmrcet.ac.in/	2002	Autonomous	Kandlakoya	Medchal-Malkajgiri	Private	
MEC	Maheshwara College of Engineering					Rangareddy	Private	
SPHN	Sphoorthy Engineering College	http://www.sphoorthyengg.ac.in/	2004	JNTUH	Vanasthallipuram	Rangareddy	Private	
IAREE	INSTITUTE OF AERONAUTICAL ENGINEERING E	http://www.iare.ac.in	2000	Autonomous	Dundigal- Gandi maisamma	Medchal-Malkajgiri district	Private	Education for Liberation

== Design & Media Colleges ==
- ICAT Design & Media College (on Hyderabad Campus)
