= List of institutions of higher education in Telangana =

There are many colleges and universities providing professional education in many fields in Telangana.

== Central universities ==
A central university or a union university in India is established by an Act of Parliament and is under the purview of the Department of Higher Education in the Union Human Resource Development Ministry. In general, universities in India are recognised by the University Grants Commission, which draws its power from the University Grants Commission Act, 1956. Fifteen professional councils control different aspects of accreditation and co-ordination. Central universities are covered by the Central Universities Act, 2009, which regulates their purpose, powers, and governance, and established universities. The following universities are located in the premises of the historical city Hyderabad.

- English and Foreign Languages University, Hyderabad
- Maulana Azad National Urdu University, Hyderabad
- Sammakka Sarakka Central Tribal University, Mulugu
- University of Hyderabad, Hyderabad

== Central institutions (autonomous institutions) ==
- All India Institute of Medical Sciences, Bibinagar
- Birla Institute of Technology and Science, Pilani – Hyderabad
- Indian Institute of Technology, Hyderabad
- National Institute of Pharmaceutical Education and Research, Hyderabad
- National Institute of Technology, Warangal

== State universities ==
State universities are run and funded by the government of each of the states of India.

Following the adoption of the Constitution of India in 1950, education became a state responsibility. Following a constitutional change in 1976, it became a joint responsibility of the states and the central government.

- Dr. B.R. Ambedkar Open University, Hyderabad
- Jawaharlal Nehru Architecture and Fine Arts University, Hyderabad
- Jawaharlal Nehru Technological University, Hyderabad
- Kakatiya University, Warangal
- Kaloji Narayana Rao University of Health Sciences, Warangal
- Mahatma Gandhi University, Nalgonda
- NALSAR University of Law, Hyderabad
- Nizam's Institute of Medical Sciences, Hyderabad
- Osmania University, Hyderabad
- P. V. Narasimha Rao Telangana Veterinary University, Hyderabad
- Palamuru University, Mahabubnagar
- Potti Sreeramulu Telugu University, Hyderabad
- Professor Jayashankar Telangana State Agricultural University, Hyderabad
- Satavahana University, Karimnagar
- Sri Konda Laxman Telangana State Horticultural University, Mulugu
- Telangana University, Nizamabad
- Veeranari Chakali Ilamma Women's University, Hyderabad
- Young India Skills University, Hyderabad

== State private universities ==
- Anurag University, Hyderabad
- Guru Nanak University, Hyderabad
- Kaveri University, Gowraram
- Mahindra University, Hyderabad
- Malla Reddy University, Hyderabad
- MNR University, Hyderabad
- NICMAR University of Construction Studies, Hyderabad
- SR University, Warangal, Hyderabad
- Sreenidhi University, Hyderabad
- St. Mary's Rehabilitation University, Pochampally
- Woxsen University, Sadasivpet

== Deemed universities ==
- Aurora Higher Education and Research Academy, Hyderabad
- Chaitanya Deemed to be University, Warangal
- Heartfulness Academy of Research and Innovation (HARI), Hyderabad
- ICFAI Foundation for Higher Education, Hyderabad
- International Institute of Information Technology, Hyderabad
- Malla Reddy Deemed to be University, Hyderabad
- Malla Reddy Vishwavidyapeeth, Hyderabad
- PHFI Institute of Public Health, Hyderabad

== Major educational and research institutes ==
- Administrative Staff College of India
- Atomic Minerals Directorate for Exploration and Research, Hyderabad
- Bharat Dynamics Limited
- Central Forensic Science Laboratory, Hyderabad
- Central Institute of Medicinal and Aromatic Plants
- Central Institute of Tool Design, Hyderabad
- Central Power Research Institute
- Central Research Institute for Dryland Agriculture (CRIDA), ICAR, Hyderabad
- Centre for Cellular and Molecular Biology (CCMB), Hyderabad
- Centre for Economic and Social Studies (CESS), Hyderabad
- Centre for High Energy Systems and Sciences (CHESS), Hyderabad
- Centre for Development of Advanced Computing
- Centre for DNA Fingerprinting and Diagnostics (CDFD), Hyderabad
- CR Rao Advanced Institute of Mathematics, Statistics and Computer Science
- Defence Metallurgical Research Laboratory (DMRL), Hyderabad
- Defence Research & Development Laboratory (DRDL)
- Defence Research Development Organization (DRDO), Hyderabad
  - Advanced Systems Laboratory
  - Advanced Numerical Research and Analysis Group
  - Research Centre Imarat
- Directorate of Poultry Research (DPR), ICAR, Hyderabad
- Directorate of Rice Research (DRR), ICAR, Hyderabad
- Dr. Marri Channa Reddy Human Resource Development Institute of Telangana
- Electronics Corporation of India Limited (ECIL), Hyderabad
- Footwear Design and Development Institute
- Forest College and Research Institute (FCRI), Hyderabad
- Genome Valley
- Hyderabad Pharma City
- Indian Immunologicals Limited
- Indian Institute of Chemical Technology (IICT), Hyderabad
- Indian Institute of Millets Research (IIMR), ICAR, Hyderabad
- Indian Institute of Oilseeds Research (DOR), ICAR, Hyderabad
- Indian Institute of Packaging, Hyderabad
- Indian National Centre for Ocean Information Services, Hyderabad
- Indian School of Business (ISB), Hyderabad
- Indian Statistical Institute
- International School of Engineering
- Institute for Development and Research in Banking Technology
- Institute of Forest Biodiversity
- Institute of Genetics and Hospital for Genetic Diseases
- Institute of Public Enterprise
- International Crops Research Institute for the Semi-Arid Tropics (ICRISAT), Hyderabad
- International Institute of Information Technology, Hyderabad,
- National Academy of Agricultural Research Management (NAARM), ICAR, Hyderabad
- National Academy of Construction, Hyderabad
- National Animal Resource Facility for Biomedical Research
- National Balloon Facility
- National Bureau of Plant Genetic Resources (NBPGR), ICAR, Hyderabad
- National Environmental Engineering Research Institute (NEER), Hyderabad
- National Geophysical Research Institute (NGRI), Hyderabad
- National Institute of Agricultural Extension Management (MANAGE), Hyderabad
- National Institute of Animal Biotechnology
- National Institute of Fashion Technology, Hyderabad
- National Institute of Indian Medical Heritage
- National Institute of Nutrition (NIN), Tarnaka, Hyderabad
- National Institute of Micro, Small and Medium Enterprises, Hyderabad
- National Institute of Plant Health Management (NIPHM), Hyderabad
- National Institute of Rural Development (NIRD)
- National Institute of Tourism and Hospitality Management
- National Police Academy
- National Remote Sensing Agency
- National Research Centre on Meat (NRCM), ICAR, Hyderabad
- National Security Guard
- National Small Industries Corporation
- NIPER Hyderabad
- Nizam's Institute of Medical Sciences
- Nuclear Fuel Complex (NFC)
- Programme Air Defence (PGAD)
- Research Centre Imarat (RCI)
- Tata Institute of Fundamental Research Hyderabad
- Tata Institute of Social Sciences, Hyderabad
- TCS Innovation Lab, Hyderabad
- The Indian Institute of Cosmetology, Aesthetics, and Nutrition (I2CAN)

== Medical colleges and research institutes ==
- Bhaskar Medical College & General Hospital, Hyderabad
- Deccan College of Medical Sciences, Hyderabad
- Gandhi Medical College, Musheerabad, Secunderabad
- Government Medical College, Nizamabad
- Kakatiya Medical College, Warangal
- Mamata Medical College, Giriprasad Nagar, Khammam
- Nizam's Institute of Medical Sciences (NIMS), Hyderabad
- Osmania Medical College, Koti, Hyderabad
- Rajiv Gandhi Institute of Medical Sciences, Adilabad
- Shadan Institute of Medical Sciences, Hyderabad
