= Education in Telangana =

Telangana has multiple institutes of higher education universities along with numerous primary and secondary schools.

== System of Telangana ==
The regional and official language of the Telangana is Telugu. Other linguistic groups in the include speakers of Urdu and Hindi. Telangana Education is offered through a number of institutes spread across the state. In Telangana the education system is of 10+2 system before joining under graduation. First standard to Tenth standard classes are conducted by the School Education under the administration of the School Education Department and finally the Tenth Class (S.S.C.) Public examination at the state level is conducted by the Board of Secondary Education. After this two year Intermediate Education under the administration of the Board of Intermediate Education. The program takes two years to complete and is divided into First Year and Second Year. The state would provide reservation in higher education to weaker sections of society on the pattern of Tamil Nadu, bypassing the 50% limit .

== Schools ==
The Telangana has a number of public and private schools and these are either affiliated to the Board of Secondary Education Telangana or Central Board of Secondary Education (CBSE), ICSE, IB, IGCSE. Government of Telangana is working towards building the excellent school system. Telangana is the 5th place for education passing percentage of 2018. Telangana has implemented various skill set in education system to make improvement on all the areas.

The Telangana State Government established the Telangana Minorities Residential Educational Institutions Society in 2015 to provide residential education for children from minority populations.

== Universities ==
Universities include:

- Dr. B.R. Ambedkar Open University, Hyderabad
- English and Foreign Languages University, Hyderabad
- ICFAI Foundation for Higher Education, Hyderabad
- Jawaharlal Nehru Architecture and Fine Arts University, Hyderabad
- Jawaharlal Nehru Technological University, Hyderabad
- Kakatiya University, Warangal
- Kaloji Narayana Rao University of Health Sciences, Warangal
- Mahatma Gandhi University, Nalgonda
- Maulana Azad National Urdu University, Hyderabad
- NALSAR University of Law, Hyderabad
- Osmania University, Hyderabad
- Palamuru University, Mahbubnagar
- Potti Sriramulu Telugu University, Hyderabad
- Professor Jayashankar Telangana State Agricultural University, Hyderabad
- Rajiv Gandhi University of Knowledge Technologies, Adilabad
- Satavahana University, Godavarikhani, Karimnagar
- Sri Konda Laxman Telangana State Horticultural University, Hyderabad
- Sri P.V. Narasimha Rao Telangana State University for Veterinary, Animal and Fishery Sciences, Hyderabad
- Symbiosis International (Deemed) University
- Telangana University, Nizamabad
- University of Hyderabad, Hyderabad
- Telangana Open School Society (TOSS) SSC & Open Inter Admission 2023-2024

== Institutes ==
Institutes include:

- Birla Institute of Technology and Science, Hyderabad
- Indian Institute of Technology, Hyderabad
- International Institute of Information Technology, Hyderabad
- Indian School of Business, Hyderabad
- National Institute of Fashion Technology, Hyderabad
- National Institute of Technology, Warangal
- Nizam's Institute of Medical Sciences, Hyderabad
- School of Planning and Architecture, Hyderabad

== Research Institutes ==
Research Institutes include:

- Administrative Staff College of India
- Atomic Minerals Directorate for Exploration and Research, Hyderabad
- Bharat Dynamics Limited
- Birla Institute of Technology and Science, Pilani – Hyderabad
- Central Forensic Science Laboratory, Hyderabad
- Central Institute of Medicinal and Aromatic Plants
- Central Institute of Tool Design, Hyderabad
- Central Power Research Institute
- Central Research Institute for Dryland Agriculture (CRIDA), ICAR, Hyderabad
- Centre for Cellular and Molecular Biology (CCMB), Hyderabad
- Centre for Economic and Social Studies (CESS), Hyderabad
- Centre for High Energy Systems and Sciences (CHESS), Hyderabad
- Centre for Development of Advanced Computing
- Centre for DNA Fingerprinting and Diagnostics (CDFD), Hyderabad
- CR Rao Advanced Institute of Mathematics, Statistics and Computer Science
- Defence Metallurgical Research Laboratory (DMRL), Hyderabad
- Defence Research & Development Laboratory (DRDL)
- Defence Research Development Organization (DRDO), Hyderabad
  - Advanced Systems Laboratory
  - Advanced Numerical Research and Analysis Group
  - Research Centre Imarat
- Directorate of Poultry Research (DPR), ICAR, Hyderabad
- Directorate of Rice Research (DRR), ICAR, Hyderabad
- Dr. Marri Channa Reddy Human Resource Development Institute of Telangana
- Electronics Corporation of India Limited (ECIL), Hyderabad
- Footwear Design and Development Institute
- Forest College and Research Institute (FCRI), Hyderabad
- Genome Valley
- Hyderabad Pharma City
- Indian Immunologicals Limited
- Indian Institute of Chemical Technology (IICT), Hyderabad
- Indian Institute of Millets Research (IIMR), ICAR, Hyderabad
- Indian Institute of Oilseeds Research (DOR), ICAR, Hyderabad
- Indian Institute of Packaging, Hyderabad
- Indian Institute of Technology Hyderabad,
- Indian National Centre for Ocean Information Services, Hyderabad
- Indian School of Business (ISB), Hyderabad
- Indian Statistical Institute
- International School of Engineering
- Institute for Development and Research in Banking Technology
- Institute of Forest Biodiversity
- Institute of Genetics and Hospital for Genetic Diseases
- Institute of Public Enterprise
- International Crops Research Institute for the Semi-Arid Tropics (ICRISAT), Hyderabad
- International Institute of Information Technology, Hyderabad,
- National Academy of Agricultural Research Management (NAARM), ICAR, Hyderabad
- National Academy of Construction, Hyderabad
- National Animal Resource Facility for Biomedical Research
- National Balloon Facility
- National Bureau of Plant Genetic Resources (NBPGR), ICAR, Hyderabad
- National Geophysical Research Institute (NGRI), Hyderabad
- National Institute of Agricultural Extension Management (MANAGE), Hyderabad
- National Institute of Animal Biotechnology
- National Institute of Fashion Technology, Hyderabad
- National Institute of Indian Medical Heritage
- National Institute of Nutrition (NIN), Tarnaka, Hyderabad
- National Institute of Micro, Small and Medium Enterprises, Hyderabad
- National Institute of Pharmaceutical Education and Research, Hyderabad
- National Institute of Plant Health Management (NIPHM), Hyderabad
- National Institute of Rural Development (NIRD)
- National Institute of Technology, Warangal (Warangal),
- National Institute of Tourism and Hospitality Management
- National Police Academy
- National Remote Sensing Agency
- National Research Centre on Meat (NRCM), ICAR, Hyderabad
- National Security Guard
- National Small Industries Corporation
- NIPER Hyderabad
- Nizam's Institute of Medical Sciences
- Nuclear Fuel Complex (NFC)
- Programme Air Defence (PGAD)
- Research Centre Imarat (RCI)
- Tata Institute of Fundamental Research Hyderabad
- Tata Institute of Social Sciences, Hyderabad
- TCS Innovation Lab, Hyderabad
- The Indian Institute of Cosmetology, Aesthetics, and Nutrition (I2CAN)

== See also ==
- Dreams Choked (documentary film)
