= St. Paul's High School, Hyderabad =

St. Paul's High School

Location
- 3-6-166, Hyderguda, Hyderabad, TS, 500029; India
- Coordinates: 17.4009345°N 78.4809844°E

Information
- Type: Private School
- Motto: Truth is Light
- Established: 1954
- Principal: Rev. Bro. Sudhakar Reddy
- Enrollment: 3000+
- Colors: Yellow & Green
- Website: http://www.stpaulshyd.edu.in

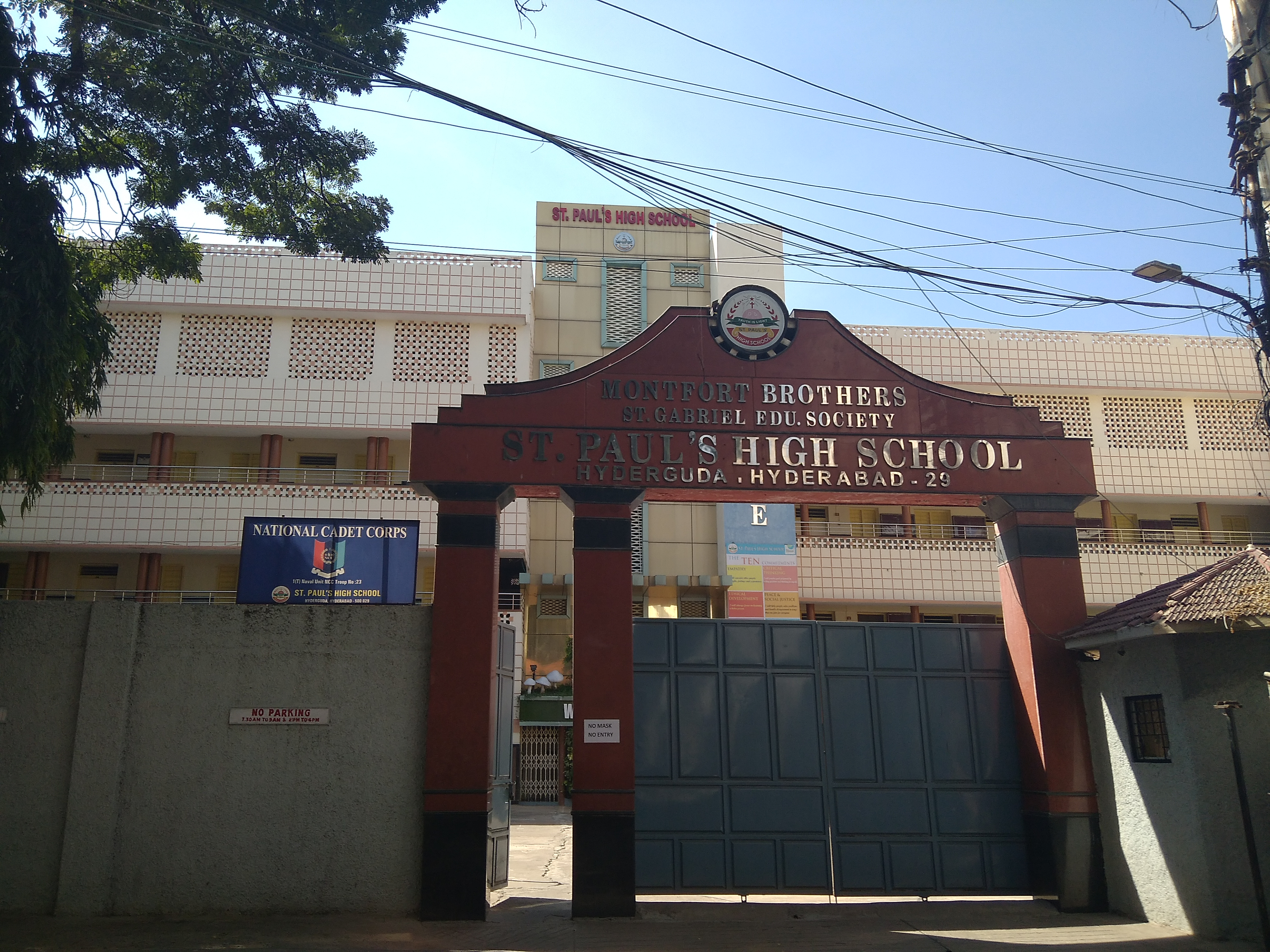

St. Paul's High School is a private, co-educational school established in 1954. It is a missionary educational institution based in Hyderabad, India and has classes from lower kindergarten to the 10th-grade level.

== History ==
The history of St. Paul's High School began in year 1954, coinciding with the centenary celebrations of All Saints High School, Hyderabad. It was during this celebratory period that Rev. Bro. John of God, the rector at the time, envisioned the creation of a new educational institution. With the acquisition of a building on King Koti Road in Hyderabad, the foundation for St. Paul's High School was laid. Named in tribute to Bro. John of God's most revered saint, St. Paul's High School embarked on its educational journey, marking a significant chapter in the history of schooling in the region.

SPHS was lauded as the best school in the twin cities and one of the ten best schools in India according to a survey conducted by Outlook magazine (2001 - 2002 & 2002 - 2003) consecutively. The school has also been ranked consistently among the ten best schools in India. The school was rated as the country's second best school for excellence in computer education by the Government of India and the award was received by Rev. Bro. Franky Noronha from then president Dr. A.P.J. Abdul Kalam in an official ceremony. Alumni include, Arshad Ayub, Speaker of the Telangana Legislative Assembly, Suresh Reddy, Mithin Aachi, Dr. Mohd. Faheemuddin, Pullela Gopichand Arvind Chenji, former Governor of Andhra Pradesh and Telangana E.S.L. Narasimhan and Nandamuri Balakrishna.

== Admissions ==
Though the school is a Catholic Minority Institution, admission is open to all students regardless of caste, creed, religion or gender. For admission into kindergarten, the school follows a joint admission policy with Little Flower High School, Hyderabad and All Saints High School, Hyderabad, both of which are also run by the Montfort Brothers of St. Gabriel.

Every year in January, one of the three schools conducts the admissions procedure for kindergarten, involving an interview of student and parents. The number of students who apply for admission far exceeds the number of positions available and hence it is a very competitive process. Students are allowed to state their choice among the three schools but their choice is not guaranteed. A twenty-percent quota is generally reserved for economically disadvantaged students.

=== Divisions ===
The school has four academic divisions- pre-primary, primary, middle and senior.

The pre-primary division has five sections each of lower and upper Kindergarten. The primary division has five sections each of Classes I to IV (Class IV is equivalent to the Fourth Grade as it is called in the USA, Canada and some other parts of the world. Note that the word "Class" is used instead of "Grade" and the year is written in Roman Numeral). The pre-primary and primary divisions are housed in one campus, commonly called the "Primary School" or "Montfort Preparatory School".

The middle school has five sections each of Classes V to VII and the high school has five sections each of Classes VIII to X. Both the middle school and high school are housed in another building, commonly called the "High School Campus". The high school campus and the primary campus are located on the same road.

=== Exams ===
The academic year starts in mid-June and ends in early April and is divided into three quarters. Examinations are held at the end of every quarter and every month.

At the end of Class X, the students take the State Government administered Secondary School Certificate Examination.

== Principals ==
- Bro. John of God - Founder
- Bro. John of the Sacred Heart - 1954-55
- Bro. Martialis - 1956-57
- Bro. Stanislaus - 1958-76
- Bro. Dominic Mary - 1976-78
- Bro. John de Britto - 1978-79
- Bro. N. C. Mathew - 1979-85
- Bro. P. K. Joseph - 1985-89
- Bro. Thomas Reddy - 1989-95
- Bro. Lawrence D’Souza - 1995-2001
- Bro. P. T. Joseph - 2001-03
- Bro. Show Reddy - 2003-2010
- Bro. Sudhakar Reddy - 2010-2016
- Bro. Rayappa Reddy - 2016-2022
- Bro. Sudhakar Reddy - 2022-

The school choir won the carol singing competition held by Little Flower High School continuously for ten years under Sir John W Geiles.

== Notable alumni ==
- K. Srinath Reddy - President, Public Health Foundation of India and former Head of the Department of Cardiology at AIIMS. Recipient of the Queen Elizabeth Medal by the Royal Society for the Promotion of Health.
- Pullela Gopichand- All England Open Badminton Champion for 2001, Rajiv Gandhi Khel Ratna Awardee, Arjuna Award. J. Cornelius Nandyal, India Olympic Badminton Team.
- Ahmed bin Abdullah Balala
- George Reddy M.Sc(Physics) Gold medalist, Osmania University.
- Mohammad Moazam Khan
- Stephen Raveendra
- Rahul Bojja
- AK Khan
- Justice Abhishek Reddy
- Justice Vijaysen Reddy
- Amjedullah Khan
- Neelesh Mehta

== See also ==
- Education in India
- List of schools in India
- List of institutions of higher education in Telangana
