= SMEC =

SMEC may refer to:

- SMEC Holdings, an Australian firm that provides consulting services on major infrastructure projects
- Saint Margaret Engineering College, in Neemrana, Alwar, Rajasthan, India
- St. Martin's Engineering College, in the Dhuallpally area of Andhra Pradesh state, India
- An annual competition held by the Sir Syed University of Engineering and Technology computer department
