= Yamnampet =

Yamnampet Pogullagudem Pogullagudem
- Village
- Interactive map of Yamnampet
- Country: India
- State: Telangana

Population (2011)
  - Total: 1,568

Languages
  - Official: Telugu
- Time zone: UTC+5:30 (IST)
- Telephone code: 040
- Vehicle registration: TS 08 XX XXXX

Yamnapet is also known as Pogullagudem a village under Pocharam Municipality, Medchal - Malkajgiri District, Telangana, India.

Sreenidhi Institute of Science and Technology is located on the borders of this village.
