= N Srinivas Rao =

Indian army officer

Major General N Srinivas Rao
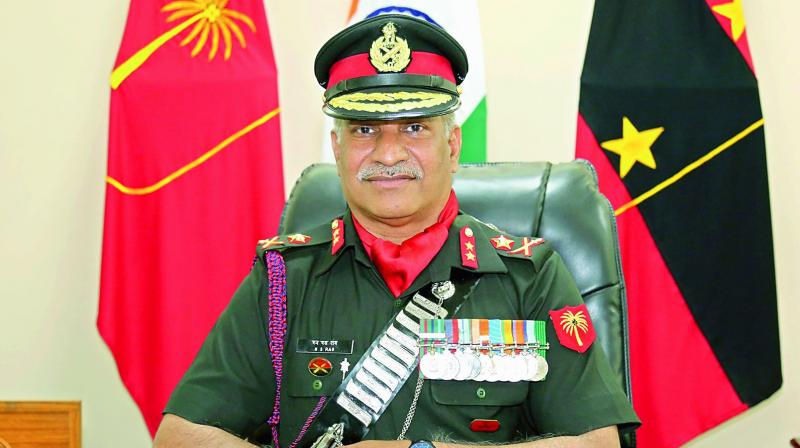
- Allegiance: India
- Branch: Indian Army
- Service years: 1981–2019
- Rank: Major General
- Commands: GOC- Telangana and Andhra Sub Area National Cadet Corps Officers Training Academy

Major General N Srinivas Rao, popularly known as, NS Rao, was a General Officer Commanding of Telangana and Andhra Pradesh (TASA). He previously served as the Commandant of NCC Officers Training Academy, Kamptee. He is from the Regiment of Artillery and has commanded an Artillery Brigade.

== Early life and education ==
Rao is an NDA Graduate. He was schooled at Wesley High School, Medak, Little Flower High School and Junior College, Hyderabad. He was commissioned in the Indian Army in 1981. He completed his MPhil from Devi Ahilya Vishwa Vidyalaya (DAVV University) and was a resident scholar at Pune University. Click here to convert into Telugu

== Military career ==
Commissioned into the Regiment of Artillery, Rao has tenured instructional assignments four times in prestigious training establishments of the Indian Army. He has also been a research scholar in the Department of Defense and Strategic Studies at University of Pune.

He was appointed as Commandant of National Cadet Corps(NCC) Officers Training Academy, Kamptee in 2015. In the two years of his command, he instituted a number of reforms and measures to improve the curriculum and administration. He improved the quality of training and living conditions of more than 550 trainee teachers of NCC and permanent instructional staff of the three services deputed to the NCC.

He has supported welfare initiatives for ex-servicemen, including the e-pension Adalat organised by the PCDA (Pensions), Allahabad. As General Officer Commanding TASA, he also supported welfare activities undertaken by the Telangana Government relating to ex-servicemen and their dependents.

After 38 years of meritorious service, Gen Rao superannuated on 31 August 2019.

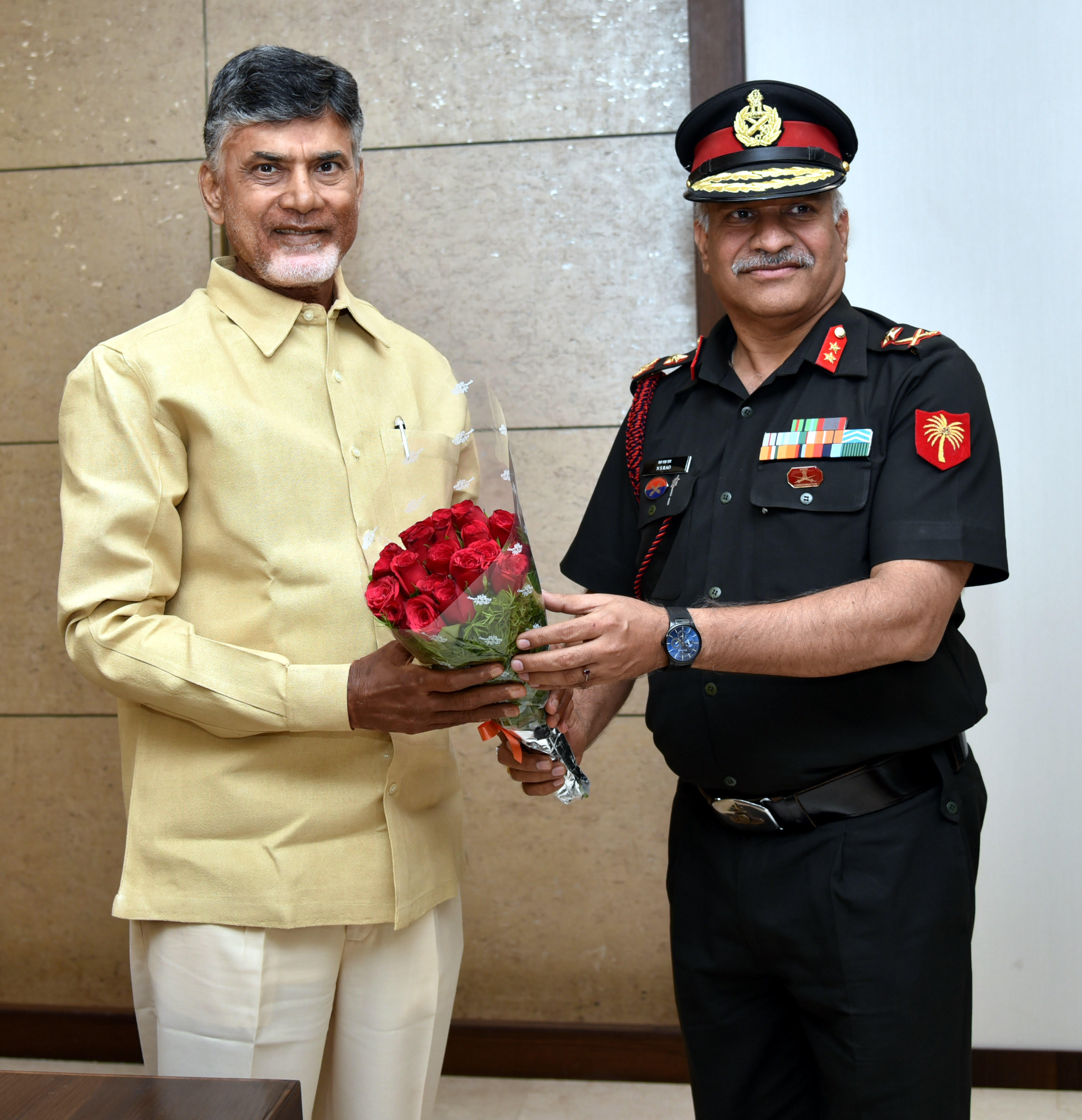
Rao meeting Chandrababu Naidu, Chief Minister Andhra Pradesh

== Honours and decorations ==
	Samanya Seva Medal	Special Service Medal	
Operation Vijay Medal	Operation Parakram Medal	Sainya Seva Medal	High Altitude Service Medal
50th Anniversary of Independence Medal	30 Years Long Service Medal	20 Years Long Service Medal	9 Years Long Service Medal

== Personal life ==
He is married to Anuradha Rao. She has been involved in welfare and empowerment of families of service personnel.
