= Sreenidhi Institute of Science and Technology =

Educational institution in Hyderabad

- Established: 1997
- Academic affiliations: Jawaharlal Nehru Technological University, Hyderabad
- Chairman: DR.K.T Mahee
- Location: Hyderabad, Telangana, India; 17°23′06″N 78°29′12″E
- Campus: Suburban, 33 acres (130,000 m^{2}) of land
- Colors: Yellow Blue and Purple
- Website: www.sreenidhi.edu.in

Sreenidhi Institute of Science and Technology (SNIST) is a private college located in Hyderabad, Telangana, India. The college is affiliated to the Jawaharlal Nehru Technological University, Hyderabad (JNTUH). In the year 2010–11, the institution attained autonomous status and it is the first college under JNTUH to get that status.

== History ==
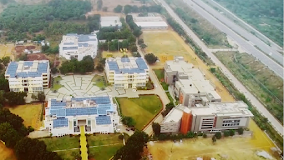
Campus aerial view

SNIST was established in 1997 with the approval of All India Council for Technical Education, Government of Andhra Pradesh, and is affiliated to Jawaharlal Nehru Technological University, Hyderabad. SNIST is sponsored by the Sree Education Society of the Sree Group of Industries.

It runs undergraduate and postgraduate programs and is engaged in research activity leading to Ph.D. Sreenidhi is recognized by the Department of Scientific and Industrial Research as a scientific and industrial research organization.

The institution was accredited by NBA of AICTE within 5 years of its existence. It has received world bank assistance under TEQIP.

== Campus location and transport ==
The SNIST campus covers 33 acres (130,000 m^{2}).It is located in Yamnampet of Ghatkesar Mandal in Medchal-Malkajgiri district of Telangana, India. SNIST Transport Department provides connectivity from various parts of the city. It has both A/C and Non-A/C Buses. Apart from this TSRTC runs exclusive trips to the college from major parts of the city which are from ECIL (2), Uppal (3), Secunderabad (2), Koti (1), L.B. Nagar (2), Dilshukhnagar (2) and Tarnaka (1).

== TEQIP scheme ==
Sreenidhi is one among the twelve technical institutions in Andhra Pradesh to receive the World Bank assistance under TEQIP scheme. In 2009 the college is rated 30th among self-financing engineering institutes in India by Outlook India.

== Student activities ==
There are various Student clubs in Sreenidhi Institute of Science and Technology.

The prominent among them are

Arts Club
Arts Club is dedicated to students exploring their hidden talents in music, dance, photography, theater etc. The club also handles multiple fests every year, Rigolade and Naach to name a few.
SAE SNIST
Established and run by students of Mechanical engineering, the club is an affiliate of Society of Automobile Engineers-India. It is involved in fabrication of vehicles such as Gokarts, ATVs and Electric vehicles. They participate under various competitions including Baja SAE, under the team name "Mechanizers".

Other clubs include:

1. The Robotics Club (TRC)
2. The Electronix Club (TEC)
3. Innovation and Creativity Club
4. IEEE SNIST SB
5. CodeChef Campus Chapter
6. The Techvision Club
7. ISTE SNIST
8. Civil Services Aspirants Club (CSAC)
9. Emerging Computers Arena
10. Streetcause
11. Sreenidhi Photography Club(SPC)
12. Bachpan Prayas
13. The Faraday's club of Electrical Igniters
14. Sreenidhi Cancer Foundation (SCF)
15. Antharprerana
16. Hackerabad
17. IoT Visionary Club
18. Cinematography of Innovation and Creativity Club (CICC)

Fests include:

1. Rigolade organized by The Arts Club and Techvision club
2. Sreevision organized by ISTE Students Chapter.
3. Adastra organized by IEEE Students Chapter.
4. Roboveda'14 (15–17 August 2014) organized by The Robotics Club. www.roboveda.org
5. Spardhaa organized by Nidhi Quiz Club
6. Zenith(Entrepreneur's Conference) by Anthar Prerana
7. Innovision organized by Innovation and Creativity Club (ICC) of college.
8. Udaan organized by The Vaughn College of Aeronautics and Technology.
9. Odyssey organized by Vox populi Club.
10. Sa-re-ga-ma by The Arts Club
11. Naach by The Arts Club
12. Walk by bachpan bachao
13. Walk for a Hope by Sreenidhi Cancer Foundation

In August 2019, The students of the institute launched a CubeSat ‘SREESAT-1’, a balloon based environment monitoring system, at the Tata Institute of Fundamental Research Hyderabad.

== See also ==
- List of educational institutions in Hyderabad
