= DVR College of Engineering and Technology =

College in India

Devarakonda Vittal Rao College of Engineering and Technology
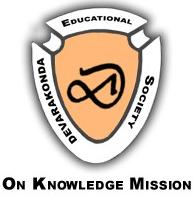
- DVR College, Kashipur
- Established: 1997
- Chancellor: Devarakonda Vittal Rao
- Location: Kashipur Village, Kandi Mandal, Telangana, India
- Campus: Kashipur
- Website: http://dvrcollege.com/

Devarakonda Vittal Rao College of Engineering and Technology (DVRCET) was an engineering college affiliated with Jawaharlal Nehru Technological University, Hyderabad. The college is currently listed as academically inactive. It functioned under the Devarakonda Educational Society.

== History ==
It was established in 1997 at the Madhapur campus (later changed to MBA campus). In year 2001, it was shifted to Kashipur Village near Sangareddy. The chairman of the college, Devarakonda Vittal Rao, was a member of the 14th Lok Sabha of India. He represented the Mahabubnagar constituency of Andhra Pradesh and was a member of the Indian National Congress (INC) political party.

== Devarakonda Educational Society ==
The Devarakonda Educational Society was established in 1994 as a non-profit organization. Sri D.Vittal Rao is the president of the society. In servicing the objective, the Devarakonda Educational Society established the D.V.R.College of Engineering and Technology in 1996, the D.V.R. Post Graduate College of Management Studies in the year 1997, offering academic programmes in Engineering, Technology, Management and MTech.

== Image gallery ==
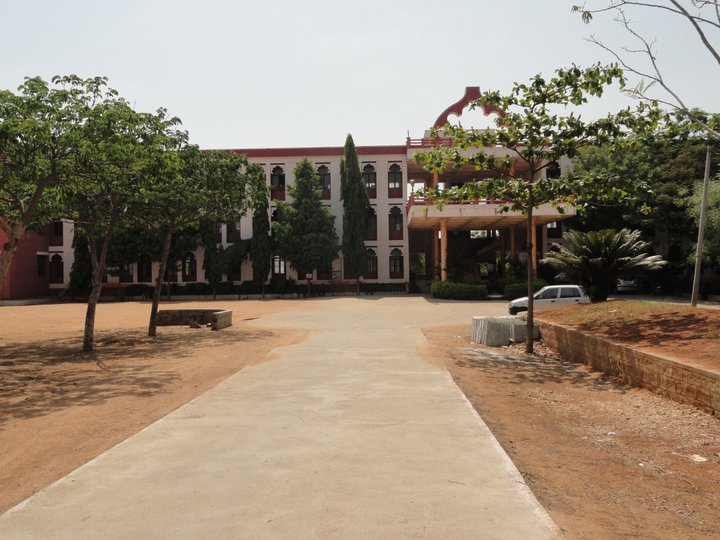

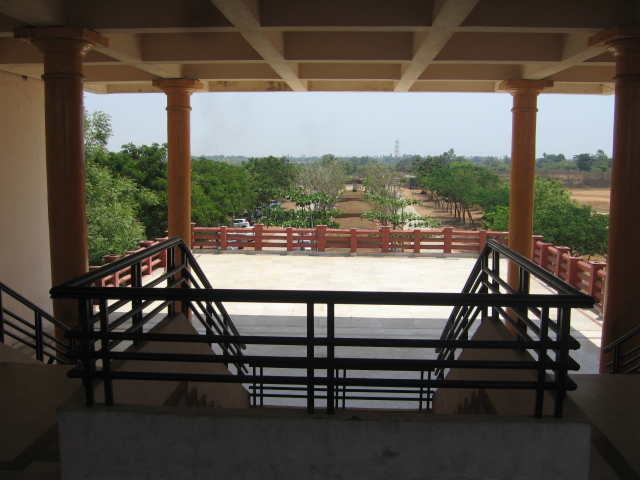

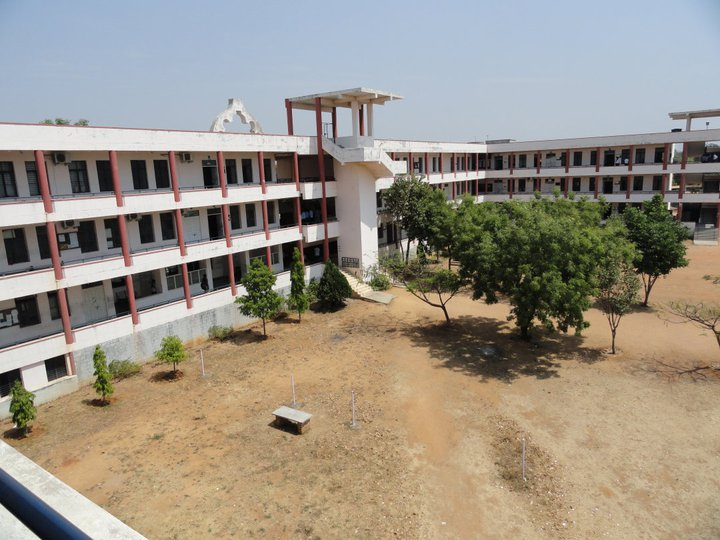

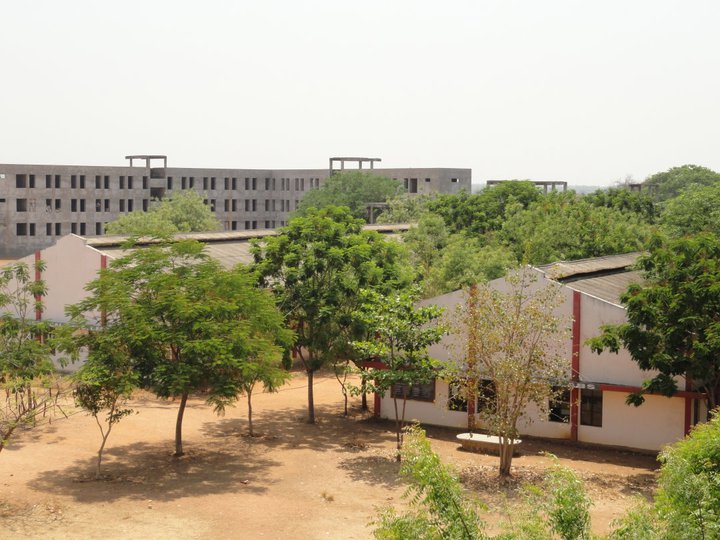

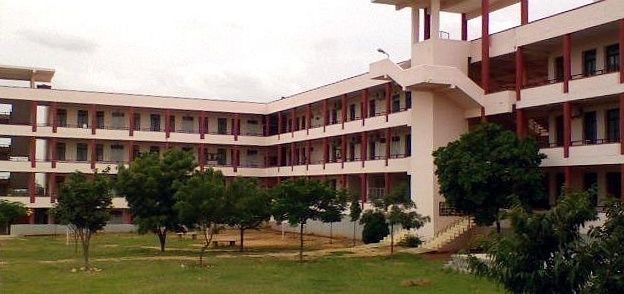
