= CMR Institute of Technology, Hyderabad =

Engineering college in India

C.M.R. Institute of Technology
- ఇన్స్టిట్యూట్ ఆఫ్ టెక్నోలజీ
- Motto: Think Placements Think CMR
- Established: 2005
- Founder: MGR Educational Society
- Academic affiliations: Jawaharlal Nehru Technological University, Hyderabad
- Chairman: Ch. Gopal Reddy
- Chairperson: Ch. Malla Reddy
- Principal: Dr. B. SATYANARAYANA
- Director: Dr. M. Janga Reddy
- Location: Kandlakoya Village, Medchal Road, Hyderabad, Telangana, 501401, India; 17.6041°N 78.4832°E
- Campus: Urban
- Website: cmrithyderabad.edu.in//
- Location within Telangana Location within India

The C.M.R. Institute of Technology is an undergraduate and postgraduate engineering college in Hyderabad, India. It was established in 2005 and is affiliated to Jawaharlal Nehru Technological University, Hyderabad. CMR Institute of Technology is now an autonomous institution. It is known as CMRIT with Eamcet College Code : CMRM.

== Admissions-intake ==
Admissions are made by the Convenor of EAMCET and ICET on Counselling. The institute also admits under the NRI Category.

- Computer Science and Engineering (CSE) - 420 seats
- Computer Science and Engineering (AI & ML) - 300 seats
- Electronics and Communication Engineering (ECE) - 240 seats
- Computer Science Engineering (Data Science) - 180 seats
- Master of Business Administration (MBA) - 120 seats
- M.Tech. - Artificial Intelligence and Data Science - 12 seats

== Industry associations ==
The institute has associations and MOUs with a lot of industries in various fields for imparting training to students at a professional level, some of them include Amazon Aws, Microsoft, Internshala, Redhat Academy, Aspiring Minds, Zensar Technologies. Naac Credits CMR institute of Technology in Telangana CMR Group Partners with Amazon Aws for Training Btech Students

== Rankings ==
University rankings

Engineering – India
- NIRF (2024): 201-300

The National Institutional Ranking Framework (NIRF) ranked the college between 201-300 in the engineering rankings in 2024.

== See also ==
- Education in India
- Literacy in India
- List of institutions of higher education in Telangana
