= Avinash College of Commerce =

Educational institute specialising in commerce and professional courses

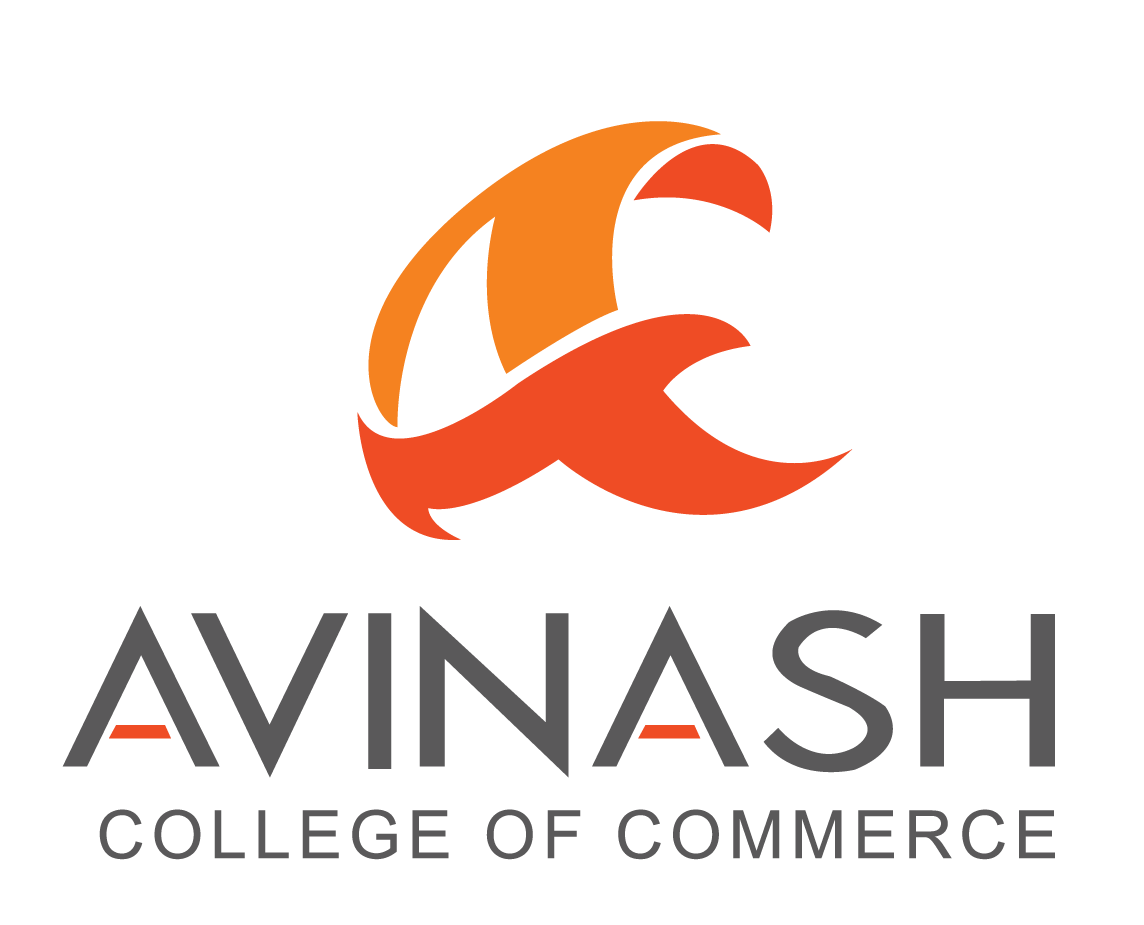
- Type: Private
- Established: 2013
- Affiliations: Osmania University
- Chairman: Avinash Brahmadevara
- Students: 6500
- Undergraduates: 4500
- Location: Hyderabad, Telangana, India; 17.4148°N 78.4017°E
- Colours: Orange, Black, White
- Website: www.avinashcollege.com

Avinash College of Commerce is an educational institute that trains students in commerce and professional courses. It is located in Hyderabad in the state of Telangana, India, and opened in 2013. The institute is founded by Avinash Brahmadevara, a post-graduate triple-qualified commerce professional.

== Academics ==
=== Philosophy ===
The core philosophy of the college lies in its industry-oriented pedagogy that emphasizes industry-preparedness, business skills and professional ethics.

=== Courses ===
The college offers intermediate courses in Economics and Commerce. It also offers undergraduate courses such as Bachelor of Business Administration (BBA) and Bachelor of Commerce (B.Com.) and provides coaching for professional courses in commerce namely Chartered Accountancy (CA), Cost Accounting (CWA) and Company secretary (CS). It also provides part-time courses for professionals .

The college also provides Certified Management Accountant (CMA) course in India.

=== Affiliations ===
The college is affiliated to Osmania University for its regular courses. For the CMA course, it has partnered with the Institute of Management Accountants (IMA USA).

== Life on Campus ==
The campus is known for its fun-filled atmosphere and cultural events.
