= MLR Institute of Technology =

University in Telangana, India

Coordinates: 17°35′43″N 78°26′29″E

- Other name: MLRIT
- Type: Private engineering college
- Established: 2005 (Autonomous)
- Accreditation: NBA and NACC
- Chairman: Marri Laxman Reddy
- Principal: K. Srinivas Rao
- Head: V. Radhika Devi
- Location: Dundigal Police Station Road, Hyderabad, Hyderabad, Telangana, 500 043, India
- Campus: 10 acres (4.0 ha); Urban
- Language: English
- Website: mlrit.ac.in

MLR Institute of Technology (MLRIT) is an Indian private higher education college. The institution was started in 2005 in located in Hyderabad, Telangana, India. It was granted autonomous status by University Grants Commission in 2015. It is accredited by the National Board of Accreditation and the National Assessment and Accreditation Council.

== History ==
The MLR Institute of Technology is a private higher education facility that was established in 2005. It is a unit of the Marri Laxman Reddy Group of Institutions. Marri Laxman Reddy is its founding chairman. It was granted autonomy status by University Grants Commission in 2015.

In 2020, Mahatma Gandhi National Council of Rural Education, the Department of Higher Education, and the Government of India recognized the institute as a Social Entrepreneurship, Swachhta, and Rural Engagement Cell (SES REC) for the services it provided during the COVID-19 pandemic. The award citation noted, "The institution has successfully framed the SES REC Action Plan and constituted ten working groups for improving facilities in the campus and the community adopted villages in the areas of sanitation and hygiene, waste management, water management, energy conservation and greenery."

In 2025, the institute formed a partnership with the University of Oklahoma in Norman, Oklahoma, US, for collaborative research.

== Campus ==
The MLR Institute of Technology is located on Dundigal Police Station Road in Hyderabad, Telangana, India. It consists of 10 acres (4.0 ha). Its buildings include research centres, laboratories, a library, a canteen, hostel accommodations, and an infirmary. In 2025, the institute opened new athletic facilities, including athletics track, and basketball courts, a football ground, and volleyball courts. Bus service is available for local transportation.

The institute also has a technology business incubation centre at Laxman Reddy Avenue in Ranga Reddy.

== Academics ==
=== Academic programs ===
MLR Institute of Technology offers undergraduate and postgraduate degrees. Its four-year degree Bachelor of Technology is awarded in nine disciplines:

- Department of Aeronautical Engineering
- Department of Computer Science and Engineering (Artificial Intelligence & Machine Learning)
- Department of Computer Science and Engineering (CSE)
- Department of Computer Science and Engineering (Cyber Security)
- Department of Computer Science and Engineering (Data Science)
- Department of Electronics and Communication Engineering (ECE)
- Department of Information Technology (IT)
- Department of Mechanical Engineering (ME)
- Department of Electrical and Electronics Engineering (EEE)

In addition, the institute offers courses through the Department of Computer Science & Information Technology, the Department of Mathematics and Humanities, the Department of Physical Education, and the Department of Research and Development.

The MLR Institute of Technology has a technology business incubation centre that is recognized under India's National Initiative for Developing and Harnessing Innovations (NIDHI) and the Atal Innovation Mission (AIM). The institute has a memorandum of understanding with Institute of Electrical and Electronics Engineers and has associations or memorandum of understanding with companies that assist in training students at a professional level, including IBM, Microsoft, Tata Advanced Systems, National Instruments, and Dassault Systèmes.

MLR Institute of Technology uses Active Learning Strategies as its instructional approach, which includes flipped classrooms, think-aloud pair problem solving, in-class teams, group writing assignments, and collaborative learning.

=== Faculty ===
Dr. V. Radhika Devi is the head of the MLR Institute of Technology. Its principal is Dr K Srinivas Rao.

=== Students ===
In the 2025–2026 academic year, the student population was 62 percent male and 38 percent female. The prior year, 71 percent of the students were from Telangana, and 29 percent were from other states of India.

Between its first graduating class in 2009 and 2025, MLR Institute of Technology has graduated 11,006 students.

=== Accreditation ===
The MLR Institute of Technology is accredited by the National Board of Accreditation (NBA) and the National Assessment and Accreditation Council (NAAC). It is also approved by the All India Council for Technical Education.

=== Rankings ===
University rankings

Engineering – India
- NIRF (2024): 201-300

The National Institutional Ranking Framework (NIRF) ranked the MLR Institute of Technology between 201 and 300 in the engineering programs for 2025.

== Admissions ==
The minimum criterion for admission into the MLR Institute of Technology is 50 percent marks in the Intermediate/10+2 Examination. Students are admitted primarily based on their ranks in the Common Entrance Test EAMCET, held by the JNTUH, Telangana every year.
