= Mamata Medical College =

Medical college in India

- మమత మెడికల్ కాలేజ్
- Type: Medical college
- Established: 1992; 34 years ago
- Founder: Sri Puvvada Nageswara Rao
- Location: Mamata Medical College Rd, Police Housing Colony, Netaji Nagar, Raheem bagh,, Khammam, Telangana, 507002, India; 17.2428042°N 80.1675623°E
- Campus: Urban
- Website: www.mamatamedicalcollege.com
- Location within Telangana Location within India

Mamata Medical College is a private medical college with a teaching hospital, Mamata General Hospital in the heart of Khammam, Telangana. It is affiliated to Kaloji Narayana Rao University of Health Sciences, Telangana.

== Location ==
It's located in Rotary Nagar area of Khammam town of Khammam District .

== Departments ==
- General Medicine
- Paediatrics
- Radio-Diagnosis
- TB & Chest
- Skin & VD
- Psychiatry
- General Surgery
- Orthopaedics
- Ophthalmology
- ENT
- Obstetrics & Gynaecology

== See also ==
- Education in India
- Literacy in India
- List of institutions of higher education in Telangana
