= Dr. S. Hussain Zaheer Memorial High School =

High school in India

Coordinates: 22.8354°N 86.2197°E

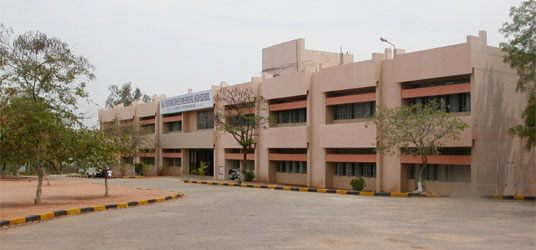
- Hyderabad, Telangana; India

Information
- Established: 1979; 47 years ago
- Affiliation: Indian Institute of Chemical Technology

Dr. Syed Hussain Zaheer Memorial High School, established in 1979, was named in honor of Dr. Syed Hussain Zaheer, the inaugural Director General of the Council of Scientific and Industrial Research (CSIR). The school was inaugurated by Prof. Saiyid Nurul Hasan, Vice President CSIR.

Located in the city of Hyderabad, Telangana, India, the school operates under the aegis of the Indian Institute of Chemical Technology and is governed by the Council of Scientific and Industrial Research.

The school has hosted several Nobel laureates such as Robert H. Grubbs (who won the Nobel Prize in Chemistry in 2005), K. Barry Sharpless (2001) and Koichi Tanaka (2002) visited the school and spoke to the students as part of the school's relationship with the Indian Institute of Chemical Technology.

Mrs. Kaisar Sayeed was the in-charge headmistress of the establishment for 34 years until her retirement in 2013. Since 2016, Mrs. Gayatri Amruth has held the position of principal.

There are plans to establish Dr. A. V. Rama Rao Science Museum at the school.

== Management and facilities ==
The school is owned and operated by the Indian Institute of Chemical Technology. The institute provides all infrastructural support for the school.

The school has a library and science laboratories, and a computer laboratory.

== Awards ==
The school attained State Level position at the SSC Public Examinations in 1995 in the state of Andhra Pradesh. Many students obtained merit positions in VII and X and scholarships from the Education Department of the Government of Andhra Pradesh.

== Extracurricular activities ==
The school offers playgrounds for cricket, basketball, volleyball, table tennis, shuttle and badminton.

On 18 July 2004, the school became the champion of the inter-school hockey tournament, defeating Moulana Azad High School 3–0 in the tournament final at Gymkhana Grounds to earn the first annual V. Purushotham memorial trophy. In the 2006 tournament, Zaheer Memorial lost to Vijaya High School (Kapra) in the tourney quarterfinals by a score of 2–1.

== Former Principals ==
No	Principals	Portrait	D.O.J	D.O.R
1	Mrs. Kaisar Sayeed		19 Jun 1979	31 Aug 2013
