= Anurag University =

Private university in Venkatapur, Telangana, India

- Type: Private University
- Established: 2020
- Chairman: Dr. P. Rajeshwar Reddy
- Chancellor: Dr. U. B. Desai
- Vice-Chancellor: Dr. Archana Mantri
- Total staff: ~1000+
- Undergraduates: ~7000
- Postgraduates: ~250
- Location: Venkatapur, Ghatkesar, Medchal-Malkajgiri District, Telangana, India - 500088
- Campus: Urban, 107 acres (43 ha)
- Website: Official website

Anurag University is a Private University located in Venkatapur, Medchal-Malkajgiri district, Hyderabad, Telangana, India. Established in 2020, and is one of the First Private Universities in the State of Telangana. The Institution currently offers 15 Undergraduate Programs, 10 Postgraduate Programs and 9 Doctoral Programs through its Schools of Engineering, Management, Pharmacy, Agriculture and Medical Sciences.

The University is spread in about 100+ acres in the eastern part of Hyderabad. The University is a kilometer away from the NH163 and is connected through TGSRTC.

== Schools ==
=== School of Engineering ===
SoE offers the following Undergraduate Programs

Duration - 4 Years

- Artificial Intelligence
- Artificial Intelligence & Machine Learning
- Civil Engineering
- Computer Science Engineering
- Computer Science Engineering (Cyber Security)
- Computer Science Engineering (Data Science)
- Electronics and Communication Engineering
- Electronics and Computer Engineering
- Electrical and Electronics Engineering
- Information Technology
- Mechanical Engineering

=== School of Management ===
SoM offers the following Programs

=== Undergraduate Program ===
Duration - 3 Years

Bachelor of Business Administration (BBA)

=== Postgraduate Program ===
Duration - 2 Years

Master of Computer Applications (MCA)

Master of Business Administration (MBA)

Master of Business Administration - Business Analytics

=== Undergraduate Program ===
Duration - 3 Years

 Bachelor of Science (Hons) - Agriculture

=== School of Medical Sciences ===
Neelima Institute of Medical Sciences, affiliated to Anurag University offers the following Programs

==== Undergraduate Program ====
MBBS (Bachelor of Medicine, Bachelor of Surgery) 

Duration - 5 & 1/2 Years

B.Sc. Nursing - Bachelor of Science in Nursing 

Duration - 51 Years

== Infrastructure ==
Anurag University consists of 8 Academic Blocks. It also has separate blocks for Examination Branch and Administration.

The University also has an in-house Stationary & Print Center - Readers, State of the Art Auditorium - APJ Abdul Kalam Hall

=== Library ===
Central Library with seating capacity of over 500 students having an area of 30000 square feet.

=== Cafeteria ===
The University has a Spacious Central Cafeteria maintained by Isthara Parks, a start-up based in Hyderabad offering North-Indian, South-Indian, Chinese & Continental Cuisines.

Central Cafeteria also has outlets of The Frankie House

Sporting Facilities

- 150 m wide Cricket Ground
- Football Ground
- 2 Volleyball Courts
- Kho-Kho/Kabaddi Court
- Basketball Court
- Indoor Sports Complex for Badminton, Chess, Table Tennis etc.

=== Accommodation ===
The University provides accommodation facilities for boys and girls

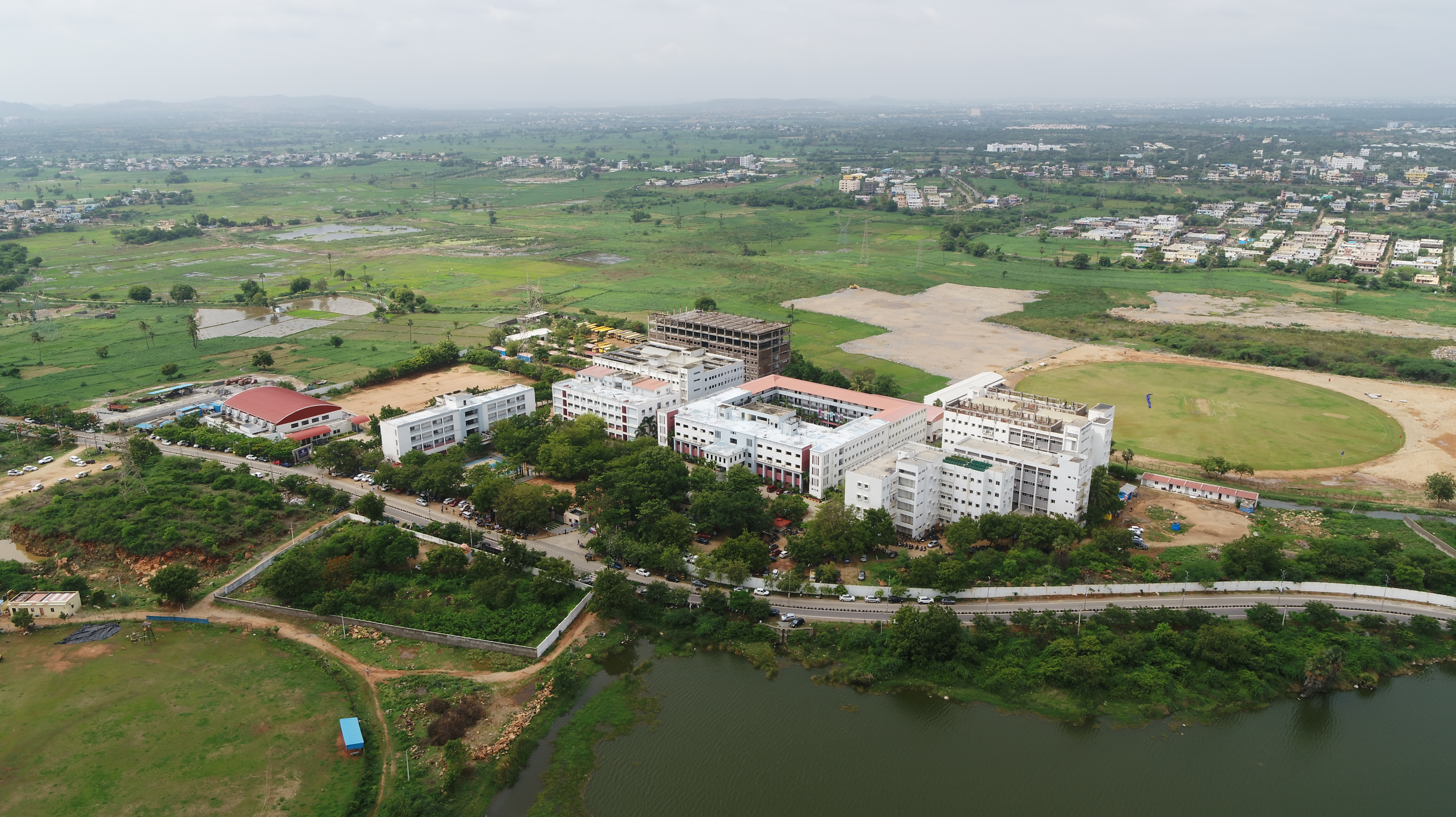
Aerial view of Anurag University Campus

== Accreditations ==
- Approved by AICTE New Delhi.
- All B.Tech and B.Pharmacy Programs have been accredited by the NBA. The Civil Engineering, Computer Science & Engineering, Electrical & Electronics Engineering and Electronics & Communication Engineering, Information Technology and Mechanical Engineering programs are accredited by NBA in Tier-I, valid up to 30.06.2025.
- UGC Autonomous Institution. Anurag is included in 2(f) & 12(B) of UGC Act.
- Accredited with A Grade by NAAC (National Assessment and Accreditation Council).
- Pharmacy programs are approved by the Pharmacy Council of India (PCI).
- MBBS (Bachelor of Medicine, Bachelor of Surgery) Program offered by Neelima Institute of Medical Sciences, Anurag University is approved my Medical Council of India
- TCS Accreditation.

== Rankings ==
- NIRF Ranking 2024: 71 in Pharmacy
  University rankings
  Pharmacy – India
  - NIRF (2024): 71
- NIRF Ranking 2023: 101-150 Rank-band in university.
- NIRF India Rankings 2022: 101-150 Rank-band in university, 140 Rank in Engineering, 58 in Pharmacy and 151-200 Rank-band in Overall category.
- NIRF India Rankings 2021: 101-150 Rank-band in university, 146 Rank in Engineering, 61 in Pharmacy and 151-200 Rank-band in Overall category.
- NIRF India Rankings 2020: 180 in Engineering, 76-100 Rank-band in Pharmacy, 151-200 Rank-band in Overall.

=== Anurag Group of Institutions Ranking ===
- NIRF India Rankings 2019: All India 160 Rank in Engineering, and 76-100 Rank-band in Pharmacy.
- Ranked 49th Best Engineering College in India - by Times Top Private Engineering Institute Rankings 2019.
- AAA+ Rating by Careers360 Ranking 2019.
- Ranked 74th Best Engineering College in India - by Times Top 100 Private Engineering Institute Rankings 2018.
- Ranked “8th Best Engineering College” in Telangana by The Week 2016.

== Awards ==
- Cisco Networking Academy Awarded the Anurag Group of Institutions as 1. Best Performing Academy in Digital Essentials at National Level 2. Best Performing Academy for Category Career Ready Courses for the Year-2019.
- Received Best Performing College award from Hon’ble President of India, by Ministry of Youth affairs & Sports, Govt. of India, on 21st Dec 2017.
- Ranked 74th Best Engineering College in India - by Times Top 100 Private Engineering Institute Rankings 2018.
- Anurag Group of Institutions (Erstwhile) has achieved “Distinguished College Award” from CSI TechNext India 2017.
- Winner of “Top Performing College Award” by IBM TGMC-2013 & 2015.
- “The Best Engineering College Award” by ISTE for All Round Performance of the year 2012.
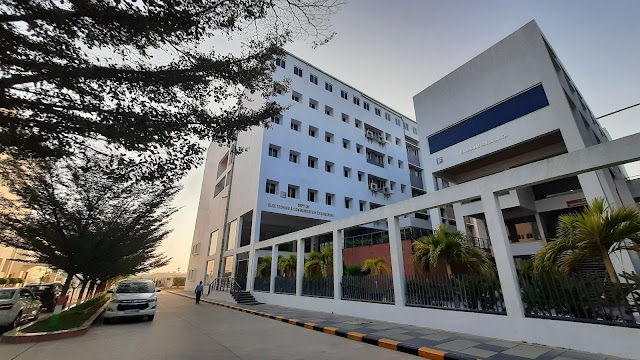
  Anurag University Block E & F

== Student Clubs in Anurag University ==
Cultural Clubs

| Aalaap – Music Club | Click Cadets - Photography Club | LiteraZe Society |
| Narthana – Folk Dance Club | Kriya - Event Management Club | Srujana Club |
| Groovin House - Hip Hop Dance Crew | SPECDAM - Arts Club | Girls Safety Club |
| Aakruthi Club | Dhraveena Club | TEDxAnuragU |
| Toastmasters Club | Sahaya | |

Technical Clubs

| CDTC | Android Club | MALAI- Artificial Intelligence and Machine Learning Club |
| Web Club | IOT Club | Null Club |
| Data Analytics Club | Cloud Club | Code Club |
| Cygnus Club | Wright Brothers’ SkillClub | MARK |
| CAD | Robotics | Drone Club |
| VLSI | Matlab | AR & VR Club |
| DatuM | GeeksforGeeks AUSC | Google Developers Student Club AUSC |

=== Professional Societies ===
| ASME | ISHRAE | IUCEE | ISTE |
| IE | SAE | CSI | ISC |
| IIChE | ACM | IETE | ISTAM |

IEEE
Circuits and Systems
Computer Society
Power & Energy
