= Malla Reddy University =

University in Hyderabad, India

- Type: Private University
- Established: 2020
- Chairman: Malla Reddy
- Chancellor: Ch. Kalpana Reddy
- Vice-Chancellor: Dr. V. S. K. Reddy
- Undergraduates: B.Tech, B.Sc, BA, BBA
- Postgraduates: M.Tech, M.Sc, MBA, MPP
- Location: Hyderabad, Telangana, India
- Website: www.mallareddyuniversity.ac.in

Malla Reddy University, Hyderabad (MRUH) is a private university located in Hyderabad, Telangana, India.

== History ==
Malla Reddy University, Hyderabad (MRUH) is a private university under green field category established in 2020.
