= SR University =

University in Telangana, India

- Type: Private University
- Established: 2002
- Chancellor: A. Varada Reddy
- Vice-Chancellor: Deepak Garg
- Location: Warangal, Telangana, India
- Website: Official website

SR University is an Indian private university located at Warangal in Telangana, established in 2020 under the purview of Sri Rajeshwara Educational Society (SREC). It is a state private university recognized under the Telangana Private Universities Act and granted recognition under Section 2(f) of the UGC Act in India.

== History ==
SREC was established in 2002 and is sponsored by the SR Educational Society. The institution has been ranked Number 91 in NIRF Engineering ranking category and 1st rank in self-financed private institutions in India by All India ranking for institutions innovation by Ministry of Education.

== Campus ==
The SR University campus is located in Ananthasagar village of Hasanparthy Mandal near Hanamkonda, Telangana, India. It is in 170 acres, with both separate hostel facilities for boys and girls. There is a huge central library along with Indias largest Technology Business Incubator (TBI) in tier 2 cities.

== Schools ==
SR University offers six schools & ten centers. with Bachelors, Masters, Doctoral programs in the following specialization with the approval of Government of India, Government of Telangana.

=== School of Computer Science and Artificial Intelligence ===
- B.Tech. Computer Science and Engineering
- B.Tech. (Computer Science and Engineering) - Artificial Intelligence & Machine Learning
- B.Tech. (Computer Science and Engineering) - Cyber Security
- B.Tech. (Computer Science and Engineering) - Data Science
- M.Tech. (Computer Science and Engineering)
- M.Tech. (Artificial Intelligence & Machine Learning)
- Ph.D. (Computer Science and Engineering)

=== School of Engineering ===
- Electronics & Communication Engineering
- B.Tech. (Electronics & Communication Engineering)
- B.Tech. (Electronics & Communication Engineering) - Artificial Intelligence & Machine Learning
- B.Tech. (Electronics & Communication Engineering) - Internet of Things
- M.Tech. (VLSI)
- M.Tech. (Internet of Things)
- Ph.D. (Electronics and Communication Engineering)
- Electrical Engineering
- B.Tech. (Electrical and Electronics Engineering)
- M.Tech. (Power Electronics)
- Ph.D. (Electrical and Electronics Engineering)
- Civil Engineering
- B.Tech. (Civil Engineering)
- M.Tech. (Construction Technology and Management)
- Ph.D. (Civil Engineering)
- Mechanical Engineering
- B.Tech. (Mechanical Engineering)
- M.Tech. (Advanced Manufacturing Systems)
- Ph.D. (Mechanical Engineering)

=== School of Business ===
- BBA (Finance & Accounting | Marketing | Business Analytics) MBA (Integrated) - [3+2]
- MBA (Master of Business Administration )
- MBA (Innovation, Entrepreneurship & Venture Development)
- Ph.D. (Management)

=== School of Agriculture ===
- B.Sc. Agriculture
- M.Sc. Agriculture
- Ph.D. Agriculture

=== School of Sciences and Humanities ===
- Ph.D. (Mathematics)
- Ph.D. (Physics)
- Ph.D. (Chemistry)
- Ph.D. (Cognitive Science)
- Ph.D. (Psychology)
- Ph.D. (English)

== Other Institutes of SR Group ==
- S.R. International Institute of Technology
- Sparkrill International School
- Sumathi Reddy Institute of Technology for Women
- S.R. Degree and P.G College
- S.R. Residential Junior College for Boys (M.P.C. block)
- S.R. Residential Junior College for Boys (Bi.P.C. block)
- S.R. Junior College for Girls (Day and Residential)
- S.R. Nava Vignana Bharathi Junior College for Boys (Day Scholars)
- S.R. Junior College for Girls
- S.R. Junior College for Boys
- K.N.R Junior College for Boys
- S.R. Junior College for Girls
- Gems Junior College for Boys, Karimnagar
- S.R. IIT Coaching Center
- S.R. EAMCET Coaching Center
- S.R. Residential High School for Boys (10th class only)
- S.R. High School for Boys (Day Scholars) (10th class only)
- S.R. High School for Girls (Day and Residential) (10th class only)
- S.R. National High School
- S.R. Junior college (DAY)

== Admissions ==
Students are admitted into the Six Schools under the following Eligibility Criteria.

- A Pass in 10+2 or equivalent examination with 60% aggregate marks.
- Candidates have to be successful in SRSAT (SR Scholastic Assessment Test)/ JEE-Main/ State Level Engineering Entrance Exams across India including EAMCET/ Merit in Sports/ Cultural Activities.

Scholarship:

- Scholarships will be given on basis of merit in Intermediate / 10+2 CBSE marks | JEE Mains percentile | EAMCET (TS & AP) or any other equivalent qualifying examination.

Eligibility Criteria for BBA/BBA-MBA

- A Pass in 10+2 or equivalent examination with 50% and above in aggregate.

Eligibility Criteria for B.Sc. (Hons.) Agriculture

- A Pass in 10+2 or equivalent examination with 55% aggregate marks. Students with Physics, Chemistry, Mathematics/ Biology (PCB) are eligible.
- Two years Diploma in Agriculture / Seed Technology after 10th class or equivalent with a first-class.

== Rankings ==
University and college rankings

- 801–1000th in World University Rankings 2026
- The National Institutional Ranking Framework (NIRF) ranked it 91st among engineering colleges in 2025.
- Received Prestigious ICAR Accreditation for SR University's School of Agriculture.
- NBA 1 Tier for all the Engineering Programs.
- Ranked major in the THE IMPACT RANKINGS 2025.

== Technology Business Incubator ==
SR Group launched SRiX (SR Innovation Exchange), a Technology Business Incubator (TBI) in Warangal. This 30,000 square foot state-of-the-art TBI is supported by Department of Science & Technology (DST) and Government of India to accelerate the startup eco-system. The TIB (Technology Business Incubator) was started by Kalvakunta Taraka Rama Rao.

== Development Centers ==
- SRiX - SR Innovation Exchange
- Nest for Entrepreneurship in Science & Technology
- Center for AI & Deep Learning (CAIDL)
- Center for Creative Cognition
- Center for Design
- Center for Embedded Systems & IoT
- Collaboratory for Social Innovation
- Center for Materials & Manufacturing
- Center for Emerging Energy Technologies
- Center for Construction Methods & Materials
- Center for Experiential Learning
- The Industry-Institute Partnership Cell
- ENGINEERING PROJECTS IN COMMUNITY SERVICE (EPICS)
- INTERNAL QUALITY ASSURANCE CELL (IQAC)
- IBM Center of Excellence
- Microsoft I-Spark Center
- SR – CISCO Local Academy offers CCNA Certification course
