= Rajiv Gandhi Institute of Medical Sciences, Adilabad =

Medical institute in Adilabad, India

Rajiv Gandhi Institute of Medical Sciences
- Type: Government
- Established: 2008; 18 years ago
- Affiliations: Kaloji Narayana Rao University of Health Sciences
- Director: R. Jaisingh
- Location: Adilabad, Telangana, India

The Rajiv Gandhi Institute of Medical Sciences, Adilabad (RIMS Adilabad) is a medical institute located in Adilabad. It is affiliated to Kaloji Narayana Rao University of Health Sciences.

== History ==
It was established by Y. S. Rajasekhara Reddy, the Chief Minister of Andhra Pradesh (2004–2009) in the year 2008. The first batch was started in 2008.

== Intake ==
The present intake is to go up by 125 seats from 2019 to 2020, taking the total to 525 seats.
