= Venkatapur =

- Village
- Interactive map of Venkatapur
- Coordinates: 18°14′50″N 79°59′51″E
- Country: India
- State: Telangana
- District: Jayashankar
- Talukas: Venkatapur

Government
  - Type: Panchayati raj (India)
  - Body: Gram panchayat

Languages
  - Official: Telugu
- Time zone: UTC+5:30 (IST)
- Vehicle registration: TS 03
- Website: telangana.gov.in

Venkatapur is a village and a mandal in Mulugu district in the state of Telangana, India. It is the second-largest revenue village of the district, comprising around 12,000 people.

== See also ==
- Ramappa Temple
