= Little Flower High School, Hyderabad =

Little Flower High School

Location
- Hyderabad, Telangana; India
- 17.3935697°N 78.4743485°E

Information
- Type: Private School
- Motto: Let Your Light Shine
- Established: 1953; 73 years ago
- Colors: Golden Yellow & Royal Blue
- Website: lfhshyd.edu.in

Little Flower High School is a missionary educational institution based in Hyderabad, India. It teaches students from lower Kindergarten up to 10th grade level.

== History ==
Little Flower High School (LFHS) was established in July 1953 by the Montfort Brothers of St. Gabriel, founded by the 17th century French priest and Catholic saint, Saint Louis de Montfort. The school was set up to mark the centenary celebrations of All Saints High School, Hyderabad.

For two years consecutively in 2001–2003, LFHS was named as the best school in the twin cities and one of the ten best schools in India, according to a survey conducted by Outlook magazine. The school has also been consistently ranked among the ten best schools in India by a survey conducted by educationworldwideonline.net. The school was rated as the country's second best school for excellence in computer education by the Government of India, and the award was received by Principal Franky Noronha from president Dr. A.P.J. Abdul Kalam in an official ceremony.

== Notable alumni ==
The school's alumni include V. V. S. Laxman, Arshad Ayub, former Governor of Andhra Pradesh and Telangana E.S.L. Narasimhan, and Nandamuri Balakrishna.

== See also ==
- Education in India
- List of schools in India
