= Keshav Memorial Institute of Technology =

Technological institution in Telangana, India

- Type: Engineering College
- Established: 2007
- Founders: Neil Gogte, Nitin Sahasrabudhe
- Affiliations: JNTU
- Principal: Dr. B L Malleswari
- Location: Hyderabad, Telangana, India; 17°23′49.9″N 78°29′24.1″E
- Website: www.kmit.in

Keshav Memorial Institute of Technology is a private engineering college in Hyderabad in Telangana, India.

It offers B.Tech degrees in computer science and engineering, artificial intelligence and machine learning, data science, and information technology.
