= Institute of Genetics and Hospital for Genetic Diseases =

Health institution in Hyderabad, India

- Type: Public
- Established: 1978
- Affiliations: Osmania University
- Location: Begumpet, Hyderabad − 500 016, India, Hyderabad, Telangana, India
- Campus: Urban

Institute of Genetics and Hospital for Genetic Diseases is a Health institution in Hyderabad, India catering to the needs of people with Genetic disorders. It was established by Osmania University in 1978.

It is established with a mission to conduct multidisciplinary research in genetic disorders and offer diagnostic services, management and counselling services to the afflicted and their families and work towards prevention.

The founder director was Prof. O. S. Reddi (1978-1988), followed by Prof. P. P. Reddy (1988-2004), Prof. M. P. J. S. Ananda Raj (2004-2005), Prof. A. Jyothi (2005-2016), Prof. Pratibha Nallari (2016 Feb 2017) and Prof. C. H. Gopal Reddy (Mar 2017-Aug 2017). Dr. A. Venkateshwari (I/C) is holding the position since 22 Aug 2017.

== Departments ==
1. Cell Biology
2. Clinical Biochemistry
3. Clinical Genetics
4. Clinical Psychology and Special Education
5. Environmental Toxicology
6. Molecular Biology

== Services ==
It offers training in Clinical, Human and Molecular Genetics to undergraduate and postgraduate students.

The Institute has till 2013 awarded 108 Ph.D. degrees, published more than 400 research papers and about 20 books.

About 125,000 cases have been enrolled in the Genetic registry and about 50,000 cases were offered genetic counseling till 2013.

== Gallery ==
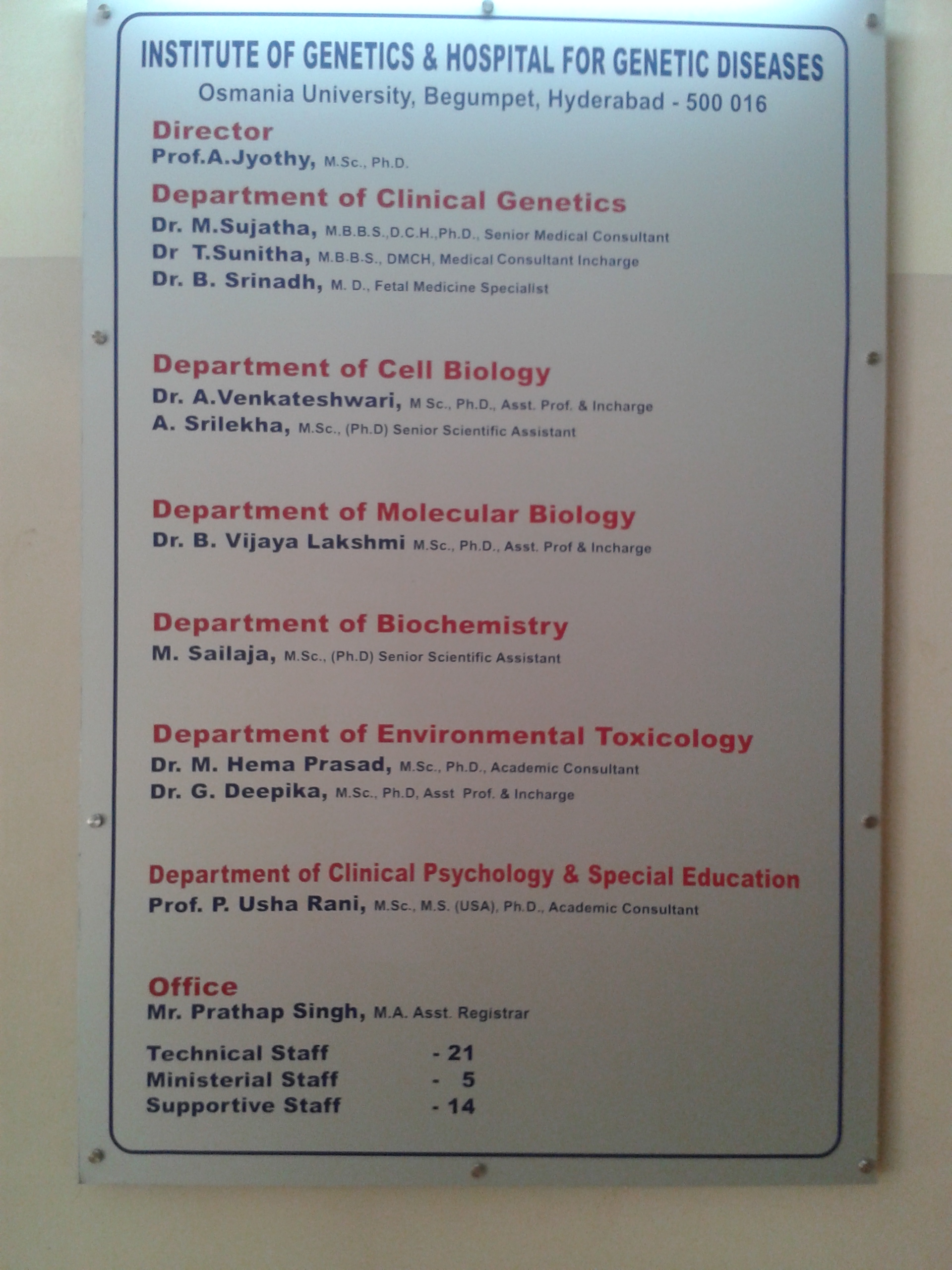
Staff members in 2014

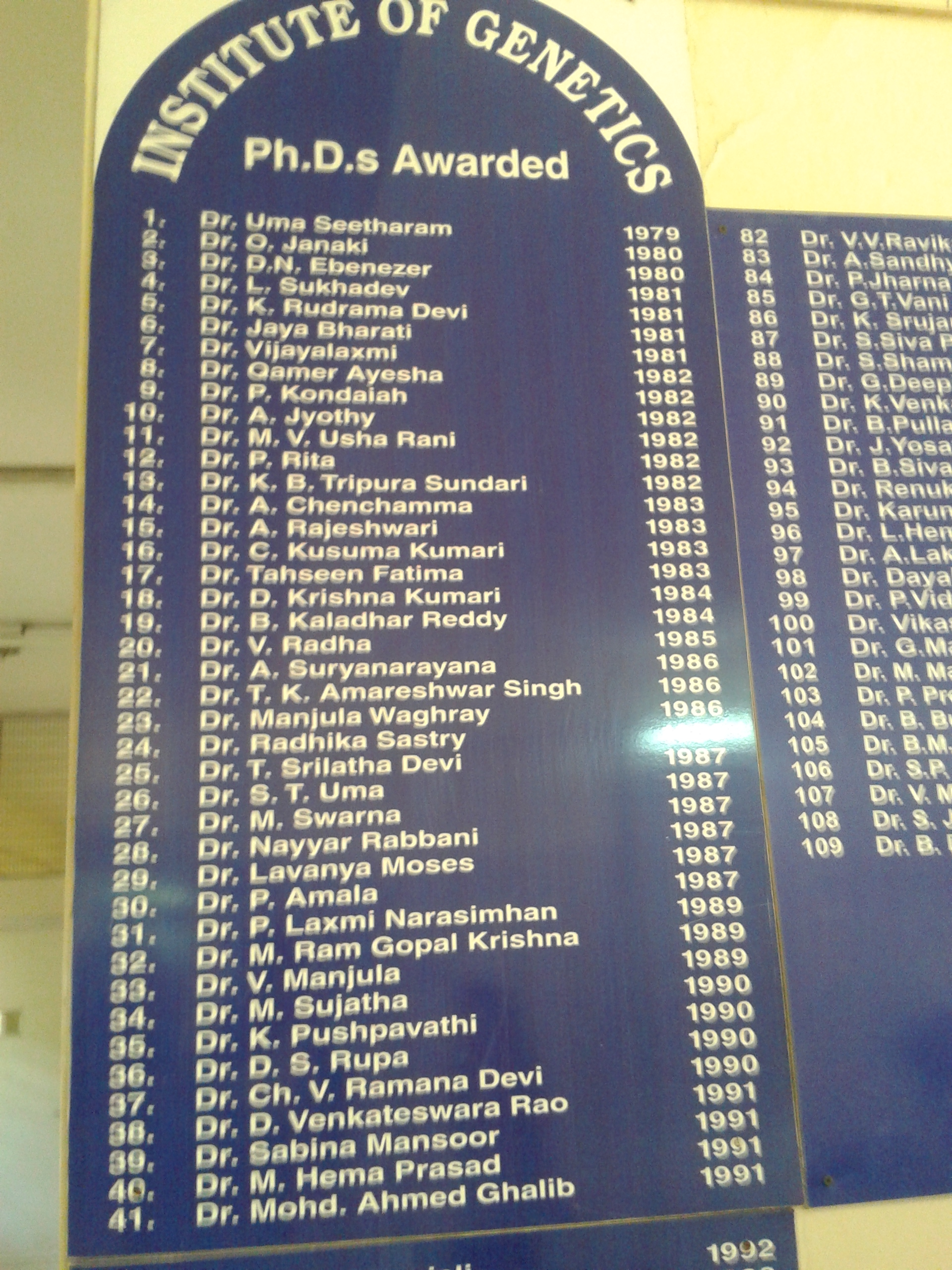
Ph.D. awardees
