= Footwear Design and Development Institute =

Research institute in Uttar Pradesh, India

- Type: Public
- Established: 1986; 40 years ago
- Affiliations: Ministry of Commerce and Industry, Government of India
- Chairman: Rajendra Kumar Jalan
- Director: Vivek Sharma, IRS
- Visitor: President of India
- Students: 1960
- Undergraduates: 1781
- Postgraduates: 179
- Location: Noida (HQ), India
- Other campuses: Chennai; Ankleshwar; Hyderabad; Kolkata; Raebareli; Rohtak; Chhindwara; Patna; Banur; Guna; Jodhpur
- Website: fddiindia.com

Footwear Design and Development Institute is an educational institute headquartered in Sector-24, Noida, Uttar Pradesh.

== History ==
FDDI was established under the aegis of the Ministry of Commerce and Industry, Government of India in 1986 with an objective to provide human resource and technical services to the industry. FDDI was upgraded to an Institute of National Importance by an act of parliament in 2017.

== Campuses ==
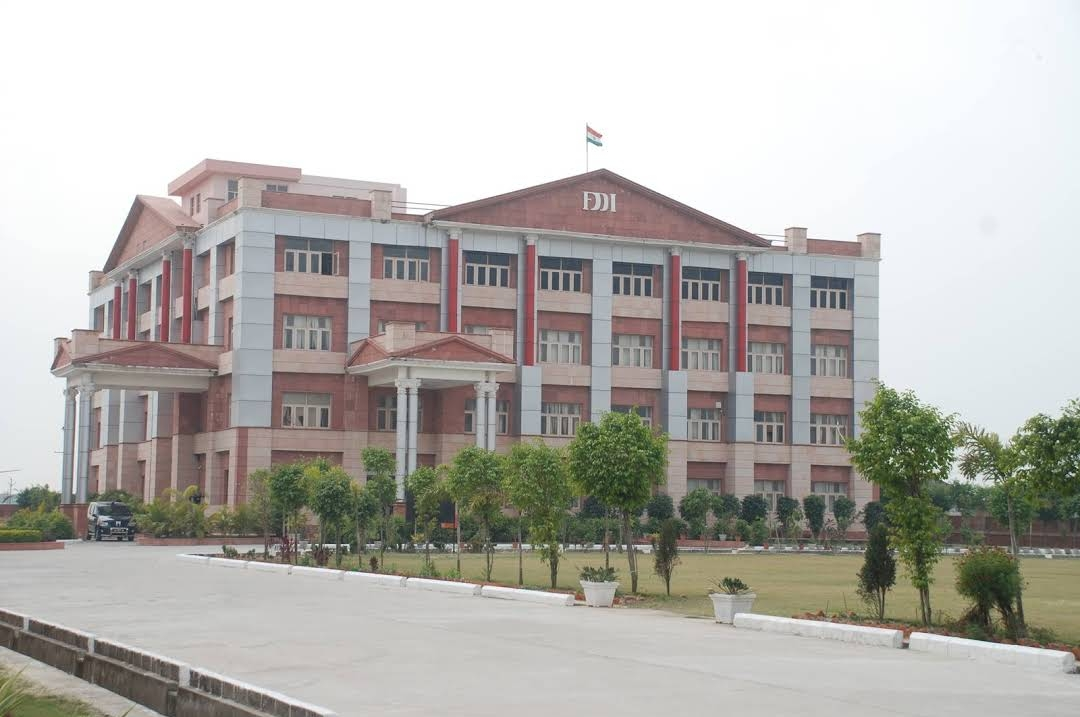
FDDI Campus Fursatganj (Raebareli)

It has campuses at Noida, Fursatganj (Raebareli), Chandigarh, Ankleshwar, Guna, Chennai, Patna, Hyderabad, Kolkata, Rohtak, Chhindwara and Jodhpur.

Location of FDDI campuses

=== FDDI Kolkata ===
FDDI Kolkata is one of the campuses of the Footwear Design and Development Institute, established in 2010. It is located within the Kolkata Leather Complex in West Bengal. The campus specializes in footwear design, fashion design, and leather product design. It offers undergraduate programs such as B.Des in Footwear Design & Production, Fashion Design, and Leather, Lifestyle and Product Design. The campus also features modern design labs, manufacturing units, and industry collaboration centers.

== Admissions ==
The FDDI All India Selection Test (FDDI-AIST) is a ONE-stage national-level entrance examination for the FDDIs, organized every year by the FDDI Admissions Cell for admissions to undergraduate and post-graduate courses. The first stage of the examination is FDDI-AIST, which is a pen-and-paper design and general aptitude test and the second stage Counselling. The tests aim to evaluate the candidate's visualization skills, creative & observation skills, knowledge, comprehension, analytical ability,

== Academic programs ==
FDDI conducts professional courses in 1. Fashion design, 2. Footwear Design & Production, 3. Retail & Fashion Management, 4. Leather Lifestyle and Product Designing

The long-term courses are Bachelor of Design for four years duration. FDDI has distinct presence not only in higher education, but, also in the spheres of industrial consultancy, research and development and training of active industry professionals.

== Labs and facilities ==
=== Labs ===
- Computer labs
- Photography lab
- Pattern making & draping labs
- Weaving labs
- Dyeing & printing labs
- Technology labs
- Garment technology labs
- Leather Design labs
- Accessory Design labs
- Digital Classrooms
