= Central Institute of Tool Design =

Institute

Coordinates: 17°27′59.64″N 78°26′41.34″E

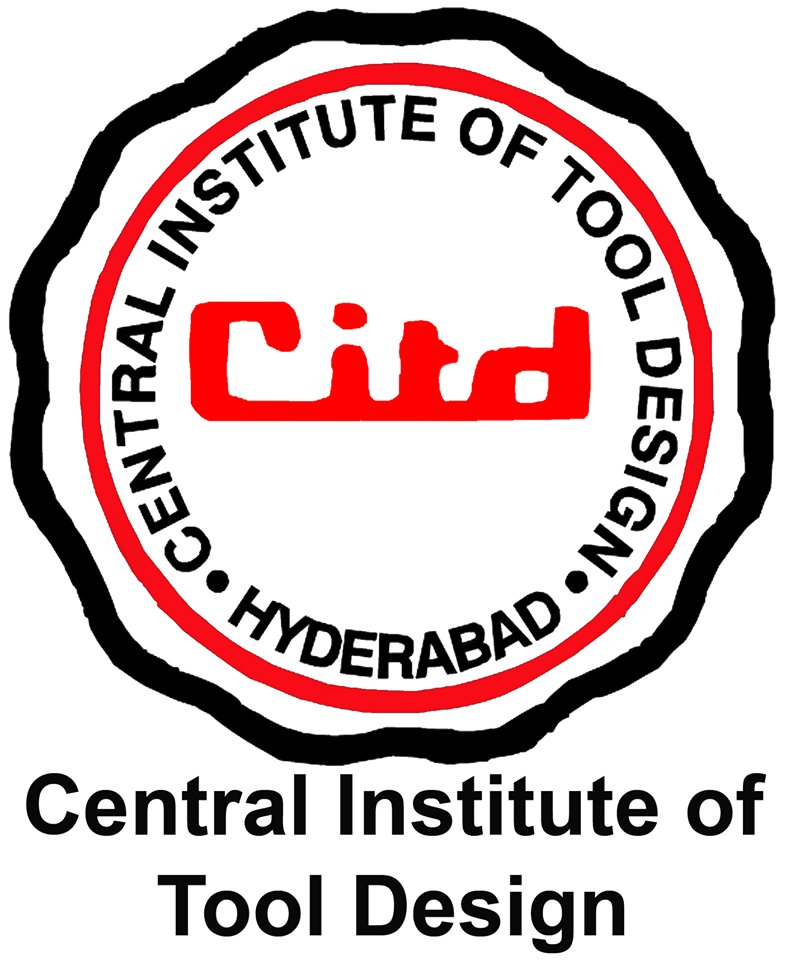
- Motto: The Institute for Enhancement of New Technology and Engineering
- Type: Autonomous institute
- Established: 1968; 58 years ago
- Affiliations: Micro Small and Medium Enterprises, Osmania University
- Director: Dr T Vijay Krishna Kanth
- Location: Hyderabad, Telangana, India
- Campus: Urban

Central Institute of Tool Design (CITD) is an institute in India providing programs in Tool Engineering and Technology . The CITD main campus is in Hyderabad, Telangana, with a branch campus in Vijayawada and an extension centre in Chennai.

== History ==
The institute was established in 1968 by the government of India with the assistance of United Nations Development Programme (UNDP) and the International Labour Organization (ILO) as an executing agency.

CITD has a library with a collection of technical books in tool engineering, along with a computerised current awareness abstracting bulletin, and a technical enquiry service. The institute extends its services to developing countries by imparting knowledge and skills to their personnel in the field of Tool Design, CAD/CAM and Low-Cost Automation Techniques.

CITD provides a consultancy and servicing facility to industry, including assistance in design and development of tools, and it also recommends measures to standardise tools and tooling elements, components of jigs and fixtures, dies and moulds and other tools. CITD is a member on technical committees of the Bureau of Indian Standards.
