= Tata Institute of Fundamental Research Hyderabad =

Indian research institute

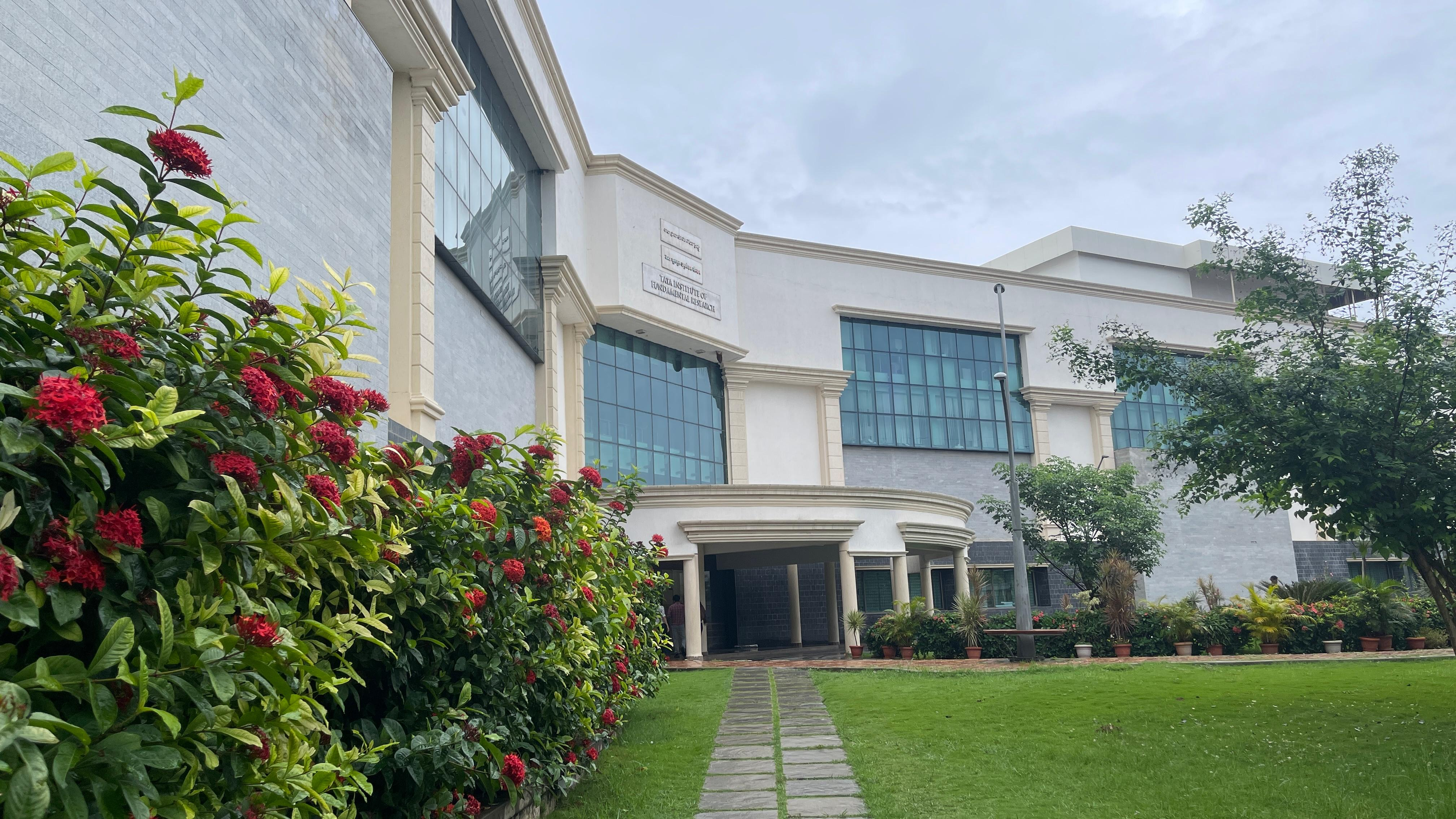
- Type: Research Institute
- Established: October 1945 (for TIFR)
- Director: M. Krishnamurthy
- Location: Hyderabad, India; 17.4443°N 78.3047°E
- Campus: Urban, 206 acres (83.4 ha)
- Website: www.tifrh.res.in

Tata Institute of Fundamental Research Hyderabad (or TIFR HYD) is a public research institution in Hyderabad, India. Then Prime Minister of India Manmohan Singh laid the foundation stone for the institute on 19 October 2010. It has operated on a campus of 209 acres (85 ha) near University of Hyderabad since moving in October 2017 from a temporary campus in Narsingi.

The TIFR Centre for Interdisciplinary Sciences (TCIS) was the first centre of TIFR Hyderabad. The faculty are drawn from all the three major branches of the natural sciences and engineering. More than a hundred graduate students, postdoctoral fellows and scientific staff work here on research topics from the life sciences, chemistry, physics and materials sciences. Substantial experimental efforts have commenced using tools of Nuclear Magnetic Resonance (NMR), Laser Sciences, Condensed Matter Physics, Synthetic and Biological Chemistry, Cell Biology, and Organismal Physiology. TIFR Hyderabad has a unique department-less structure.

== Research areas ==
- Biological Physics and Mechanobiology
- Biophysical Chemistry and Molecular Biophysics
- Cell and Cancer Biology
- Chemical Biology
- Ecology and Ecophysiology
- Computational Chemistry and Physics
- Fluid Dynamics
- Fluorescence Spectroscopy and Microscopy
- Laser Physics
- Materials Science
- Molecular Genetics
- Molecular Immunology and Cell Signaling
- NMR Spectroscopy
- Soft Matter
- Synthetic Chemistry
- Theoretical Chemistry and Physics
