= Jawaharlal Nehru Technological University, Hyderabad =

University in Hyderabad, Telangana, India

Jawaharlal Nehru Technological University Hyderabad
- Former name: Nagarjuna Sagar Engineering College
- Motto in English: Gateway to Excellence
- Type: Public
- Established: 1972; 54 years ago
- Academic affiliations: UGC•AICTE
- Chancellor: Governor of Telangana
- Vice-Chancellor: T. Kishen Kumar Reddy
- Location: Kukatpally, Hyderabad, Telangana, 500085, India; 17°29′48″N 78°23′33″E
- Campus: 89 acres; Urban
- Language: English
- Website: www.jntuh.ac.in

Jawaharlal Nehru Technological University, Hyderabad (JNTU Hyderabad) is a collegiate public state university located in Kukatpally, Hyderabad, Telangana, India. Founded in 1965 as the Nagarjuna Sagar Engineering College, it was established as a university in 1972 by "The Jawaharlal Nehru Technological University Act, 1972'".

JNTU Hyderabad is a non-profit university which is funded and managed by the Government of Telangana. Admissions into the Bachelors, Masters and Doctoral programs in main campus is on a merit basis, evaluated by national entrance examinations such as TG-EAPCET, TG-CPGET, TG-LAWCET, and GATE for each of the programs offered.

The Main campus is ranked 81st among Indian universities, and the College of Engineering is ranked 94th among engineering colleges by the NIRF 2025 Rankings.

== History ==
Jawaharlal Nehru Technological University was established on 2 October 1972, by an act of State Legislature. On its formation, the Government Engineering Colleges at Anantapur, Kakinada and Hyderabad, along with the Government College of Fine Arts and Architecture at Hyderabad, became its constituent colleges. Subsequently, JNTU act 1972 was amended by JNTU (Amendment) Ordinance, 1992 1 to affiliate any other college or Institution notified by the A.P. State Government. Hence, JNT University is a multi-campus university with headquarters at Hyderabad.

As per the Act No. 30 and Act No. 31 of 2008 dated 24 September 2008, Jawaharlal Nehru Technological was divided into four universities, Jawaharlal Nehru Technological University Hyderabad (JNTUH), Jawaharlal Nehru Technological University Kakinada (JNTUK), Jawaharlal Nehru Technological University Anantapur (JNTUA) and Jawaharlal Nehru Architecture and Fine Arts University, Hyderabad.

== Organisation and administration ==
=== Governance ===
This university consists of the constituent and affiliated colleges. The main officers and councils of the university are Chancellor, Vice-Chancellor (VC), Rector, Executive Council and Academic Senate. The Governor of Telangana is the Chancellor of the university. The first Vice-Chancellor of the university was Prof. D. N. Reddy. As of February 2025, the present Vice-Chancellor is Prof. T. Kishen Kumar Reddy, the Rector is Dr. K Vijay Kumar Reddy, and the Registrar is Dr. K Venkateswara Rao.

=== Constituent colleges ===
The university includes the following constituent colleges:

- JNTUH University College of Engineering Science and Technology, Hyderabad
- JNTUH University College of Engineering, Jagtial
- JNTUH University College of Engineering, Manthani, Peddapalli
- JNTUH University College of Engineering, Sultanpur
- JNTUH University College of Engineering, Rajanna Sircilla
- JNTUH University College of Engineering, Wanaparthy
- JNTUH University College of Engineering, Mahabubabad
- JNTUH University College of Engineering, Palair
- JNTUH School of Information Technology
- JNTUH Institute of Science and Technology
- JNTUH School of Management Studies
- UGC-Human Resource Development Centre (UGC-HRDC)

== Affiliated Colleges ==
There are hundreds of colleges that are/ were affiliated to JNTU Hyderabad. Each academic year, new colleges are added based on new applications from them and removed based on various factors.

== Academics ==
=== Academic programmes ===
An institution with academic and research-oriented courses, the B.Tech programs (undergraduate programs) number about 25. Major branches among them are Aeronautical Engineering, Automobile, Biotechnology, Information Technology, Electronics, Electrical, Instrumentation and Control, Metallurgy, Mechanical, Bio-medical, Chemical and Civil. A few courses are offered through the correspondence-cum-contact mode.

The postgraduate programs number 77, namely M.Tech, MSIT, MBA, MCA and MSc. The major branches are Bio-Technology, Biochemical Engineering, Chemical Engineering, Civil Engineering, Remote-Sensing and GIS, Electronics and Communication Engineering, Water Resources, Mechanical Engineering, Nano-Technology, Energy Systems, Environmental Studies, Microbiology, Food Technology, Management, Computer Applications, Pharmaceutical Sciences, Environmental Geomatics and Environmental Management.

=== Rankings ===
University rankings

Engineering – India
- NIRF (2024): 88

The NIRF ranked Jawaharlal Nehru Technological University, Hyderabad 94th in the engineering rankings in 2025, and 81st in university rankings in 2025.

== See also ==
- Jawaharlal Nehru University
