= COVID-19 pandemic in Dadra and Nagar Haveli and Daman and Diu =

Ongoing COVID-19 viral pandemic in Dadra and Nagar Haveli and Daman and Diu, India

- Disease: COVID-19
- Pathogen: SARS-CoV-2
- Location: Dadra and Nagar Haveli and Daman and Diu, India
- First outbreak: Wuhan, Hubei, China
- Arrival date: 10 April 2020 (6 years and 5 months)

The first case of the COVID-19 pandemic in India was reported on 30 January 2020, originating from China. Slowly, the pandemic spread to various states and union territories including the union territory of Dadra and Nagar Haveli and Daman and Diu. The first case was recorded in this region on 10 April 2020.

== Timeline ==
=== June 2020 ===
- As of 5 June 2020, the total number of cases in Dadra and Nagar Haveli and Daman and Diu was 14. There are 13 active cases and one has fully recovered from the virus.
- As of 7 June, the total number of cases was 20, including 18 active cases and two recoveries.
- As of 23 June, the total number of cases was 102, including 75 active cases and 27 recoveries.
- As of 26 June, the total number of cases was 168, including 118 active cases and 50 cures.

=== July 2020 ===
- As of 2 July, the total number of cases in the UT was 253, including 141 active cases and 112 cures.
- As of 6 July, the total number of cases was 397, including 222 active cases and 175 cures.
- As of 12 July, the total number of cases was 495, including 226 active cases and 268 cures. 1 person died from the virus.
- As of 16 July, the total number of cases in the UT was 569, including 175 active cases and 392 remissions and 2 deaths.
- As of 22 July, the total number of cases is 739, including 252 active cases and 475 cures and 2 fatalities.
- As of 27 July, the total number of cases is 993, including 374 active cases and 616 cures and 3 deaths.
- On 28 July, the total number of cases in Dadra and Nagar Haveli and Daman and Diu crossed 1000.

=== August 2020 ===
- As of 3 August, the total number of cases in Dadra & Nagar Haveli and Daman & Diu was 1327, including 395 active cases and 920 cures. 2 persons died from the virus.
- As of 19 August, the total number of cases in the UT was 1979, including 410 active cases, 1567 cures and 2 persons died from the virus.
- As of 25 August, the total number of cases was 2198, including 356 active cases and 1816 cures and 2 fatalities.
- As of 29 August, the total number of cases was 2291, including 290 active cases and 1989 cures and 2 deaths.
- As of 31 August, the total number of cases was 2367, including 264 active cases and 2081 recoveries and 2 fatalities.

=== September 2020 ===
- As of 2 September, the total number of cases in Dadra & Nagar Haveli and Daman & Diu was 2430, including 269 active cases and 2139 cures. 2 persons died from the virus.
- As of 6 September, the total number of cases was 2563, including 290 active cases and 2271 cures, whereas 2 persons have died.
- As of 7 September, the total number of cases was 2566, including 286 active cases, 2278 cures and 2 persons died.
- As of 11 September, the total number of cases in the UT was 2657, including 265 active cases, 2390 cures and 2 deaths.
- As of 12 September, the total number of cases was 2683, including 240 active cases, 2441 cures and 2 deaths.
- As of 13 September, the total number of cases was 2692, including 230 active cases, 2460 cures and 2 deaths.
- As of 16 September, the total number of cases was 2783, including 216 active cases and 2565 cures, whereas 2 persons have died.
- As of 17 September, the total number of cases was 2800, including 210 active cases, 2588 recoveries and 2 persons died.
- As of 20 September, the total number of cases in the UT was 2884, including 227 active cases, 2655 cures and 2 deaths.
- As of 22 September, the total number of cases is 2918, including 200 active cases, 2716 cures and 2 deaths.
- As of 24 September, the total number of cases was 2978, including 197 active cases and 2749 cures and 2 deaths.
- As of 28 September, the total number of cases was 3015, including 145 active cases, 2836 cures and 2 deaths.

=== October 2020 ===
- As of 2 October, the total number of cases in Dadra & Nagar Haveli and Daman & Diu was 3032, including 102 active cases, 2928 recoveries and 2 persons died from the virus.
- As of 4 October, the total number of cases was 3055, including 106 active cases, 2947 recoveries and 2 deaths.
- As of 5 October, the total number of cases was 3062, including 101 active cases, 2959 cures and 2 deaths.
- As of 6 October, the total number of cases was 3073, including 103 active cases, 2968 recoveries and 2 fatalities.
- As of 11 October, the total number of cases was 3138, including 105 active cases, 3031 recoveries and 2 deaths.
- As of 14 October, the total number of cases was 3145, including 78 active cases, 3065 cures and 2 deaths.
- As of 20 October, the total number of cases was 3169, including 39 active cases, 3128 recoveries and 2 deaths.
- As of 25 October, the total number of cases in the UT was 3200, including 52 active cases, 3146 recoveries and 2 fatalities.
- As of 30 October, the total number of cases was 3220, including 50 active cases, 3168 recoveries and 2 deaths.

=== November 2020 ===
- As of 8 November, the total number of cases in Dadra & Nagar Haveli and Daman & Diu was 3242, including 25 active cases, 3215 recoveries and 2 persons have died. Dadra & Nagar Haveli and Daman & Diu was the only state/UT (barring Lakshdweep, which has not reported even a single case) in India with less than 50 active cases.
- As of 10 November, the total number of cases was 3243, including 19 active cases, 3222 recoveries and 2 persons have died.
- As of 23 November, the total number of cases in the UT was 3291, including 43 active cases, 3246 recoveries and 2 deaths.
- As of 26 November, the total number of cases in the UT was 3294, including 36 active cases, 3256 recoveries and 2 deaths.
- As of 29 November, the total number of cases was 3298, including 25 active cases, 3271 recoveries and 2 deaths.

=== December 2020 ===
- As of 1 December, the total number of cases in Dadra & Nagar Haveli and Daman & Diu was 3299, including 18 active cases, 3279 recoveries and 2 persons have died.
- As of 6 December, the total number of cases was 3307, including 16 active cases, 3289 recoveries and 2 persons have died.
- As of 10 December, the total number of cases was 3319, including 23 active cases, 3294 recoveries and 2 fatalities.
- As of 16 December, the total number of cases was 3320, including 16 active cases, 3302 cures and 2 deaths.
- As of 21 December, the total number of cases was 3324, including 7 active cases, 3315 cures and 2 deaths. It the only state with Active cases in single digit.
- As of 22 December, the total number of cases was 3325, including 8 active cases, 3315 cures and 2 deaths.
- As of 27 December, the total number of cases was 3331, including 11 active cases, 3318 recoveries and 2 deaths.
- As of 31 December, the total number of cases in the UT was 3335, including 13 active cases, 3320 recoveries and 2 deaths.

=== January 2021 ===
- As of 6 January, the total number of cases in Dadra & Nagar Haveli and Daman & Diu was 3336, including 7 active cases, 3327 recoveries and 2 deaths.
- As of 10 January, the total number of cases was 3337, including 5 active cases, 3330 recoveries and 2 deaths.
- As of 14 January, the total number of cases was 3342, including 9 active cases, 3331 recoveries and 2 deaths.
- As of 19 January, the total number of cases was 3345, including 9 active cases, 3334 cures and 2 deaths.
- As of 24 January, the total number of cases in the UT was 3348, including 8 active cases, 3338 cures and 2 fatalities.

=== February 2021 ===
- As of 1 February, the total number of cases in Dadra & Nagar Haveli and Daman & Diu was 3351, including 6 active cases, 3343 recoveries and 2 deaths.
- As of 7 February, the total number of cases was 3351, including 4 active cases, 3345 recoveries and 2 deaths.
- As of 11 February, the total number of cases was 3351, including 3 active cases, 3346 cures and 2 deaths. There hasn't been any new Covid case in the UT during the last 10 days.
- As of 16 February, the total number of cases was 3353, including 2 active cases, 3349 cures and 2 deaths.
- As of 23 February, the total number of cases in the UT was 3355, including 2 active cases, 3351 cures and 2 fatalities.

=== March 2021 ===
- As of 6 March, the total number of cases in Dadra & Nagar Haveli and Daman & Diu was 3362, including 4 active cases, 3356 recoveries and 2 deaths.
- As of 22 March, the total number of cases in the UT was 3437, including 52 active cases, 3383 recoveries and 2 deaths.
- As of 29 March, the total number of cases was 3567, including 150 active cases, 3415 recoveries and 2 deaths.

=== April 2021 ===
- As of 5 April, the total number of cases in Dadra & Nagar Haveli and Daman & Diu was 3691, including 199 active cases, 3490 recoveries and 2 deaths.
- As of 12 April, the total number of cases was 4094, including 454 active cases, 3638 recoveries and 2 deaths.

=== May 2021 ===
- As of 8 May, the total number of cases in Dadra & Nagar Haveli and Daman & Diu was 8904, including 1613 active cases, 7287 recoveries and 4 deaths.
- As of 17 May, the total number of cases was 9656, including 835 active cases, 8817 recoveries and 4 deaths.
- As of 19 May, the total number of cases was 9721, including 700 active cases, 9017 recoveries and 4 fatalities.
- As of 25 May, the total number of cases was 9902, including 500 active cases, 9398 cures and 4 deaths.

=== June 2021 ===
- As of 17 June, the total number of cases in Dadra & Nagar Haveli and Daman & Diu was 10459, including 66 active cases, 10389 recoveries and 4 deaths.
- As of 25 June, the total number of cases was 10498, including 50 active cases, 10444 recoveries and 4 deaths.

=== July 2021 ===
- As of 13 July, the total number of cases in Dadra & Nagar Haveli and Daman & Diu was 10592, including 22 active cases, 10535 recoveries and 4 deaths.

=== August 2021 ===
- As of 27 August, the total number of cases in Dadra & Nagar Haveli and Daman & Diu was 10666, including 9 active cases, 10622 cures and 4 deaths.
- As of 30 August, the total number of cases was 10666, including 6 active cases, 10625 recoveries and 4 deaths.

=== September 2021 ===
- As of 23 September, the total number of cases in Dadra & Nagar Haveli and Daman & Diu was 10642, including no active case, 10638 cures and 4 deaths.
- As of 28 September, the total number of cases was 10643, including no active case, 10638 cures and 4 deaths.

=== Oct to Dec 2021 ===
- As of 6 October, the total number of cases in Dadra & Nagar Haveli and Daman & Diu was 10644, including 2 active cases, 10638 cures and 4 deaths.
- As of 23 October, the total number of cases in the UT was 10681, including 4 active cases, 10642 cures and 4 deaths.
- As of 2 November, the total number of cases was 10681, including 4 active cases, 10644 recoveries and 4 deaths.
- As of 4 December, the total number of cases was 10683, including zero active case, 10679 recoveries and 4 deaths.
- As of 29 December, the total number of cases was 10691, including 1 active case, 10686 recoveries and 4 deaths. There hasn't been any covid related death in the UT in the last 8 months.

=== Jan to Mar 2022 ===
- As of 9 January, the total number of cases in Dadra & Nagar Haveli and Daman & Diu was 10771, including 78 active cases, 10689 cures and 4 deaths.
- As of 15 January, the total number of cases in the UT was 10950, including 198 active cases, 10748 cures and 4 deaths.
- As of 22 January, the total number of cases was 11172, including 238 active cases, 10930 recoveries and 4 deaths.
- As of 25 January, the total number of cases was 11231, including 198 active cases, 11029 cures and 4 fatal cases.
- As of 5 February, the total number of cases was 11396, including 98 active cases, 11294 cures and 4 deaths.
- As of 11 February, the total number of cases was 11417, including 28 active cases, 11385 recoveries and 4 deaths.
- As of 27 February, the total number of cases was 11438, including 1 active case, 11433 recoveries and 4 deaths.
- As of 19 March, the total number of cases was 11441, including 1 active case, 11436 recoveries and 4 fatalities.

=== Apr to Jun 2022 ===
- As of 8 April, the total number of cases in Dadra & Nagar Haveli and Daman & Diu was 11441, including no active cases, 11437 cures and 4 deaths.
- As of 16 April, the total number of cases in Dadra & Nagar Haveli and Daman & Diu was 11441, including no active cases, 11437 recoveries and 4 deaths. No single Covid positive case was observed in more than a week's time in the UT.
- As of 2 May, the total number of cases in the UT was 11441, including no active cases, 11437 cures and 4 fatal cases.
- As of 12 May, the total number of cases in the UT was 11441, including no active cases, 11437 cures and 4 deaths. No single Covid positive case was observed in more than a month's time in the region.
- As of 28 May, the total number of cases in the UT was 11441, including no active cases, 11437 cures and 4 deaths.
- As of 9 June, the total number of cases was 11441, including no active cases, 11437 recoveries and 4 deaths.
- As of 20 June, the total number of cases was 11441, including no active cases, 11437 cures and 4 deaths. No single Covid positive case was observed in more than a couple of month's time in the UT.

=== July to December 2022 ===
- As of 8 July, the total number of cases in Dadra & Nagar Haveli and Daman & Diu was 11497, including 13 active cases, 11480 cures and 4 deaths.
- As of 16 July, the total number of cases was 11510, including 13 active cases, 11493 recoveries and 4 deaths.
- As of 30 August, the total number of cases was 11574, including 5 active cases, 11565 cures and 4 fatal cases.
- As of 4 September, the total number of cases was 11578, including 3 active cases, 11571 cures and 4 deaths.
- As of 17 September, the total number of cases was 11585, including 3 active cases, 11578 recoveries and 4 fatalities.
- As of 26 October, the total number of cases was 11588, including 1 active case, 11583 recoveries and 4 deaths.

=== 2023 ===
- As of 22 March, the total number of cases in Dadra & Nagar Haveli and Daman & Diu was 11591, including 11587 cures and 4 deaths. There wasn't any active case in the UT.

=== 2025 ===
- As of 28 April, the total number of cases in Dadra & Nagar Haveli and Daman & Diu was 11592.

== COVID-19 vaccines with approval for emergency or conditional usage ==
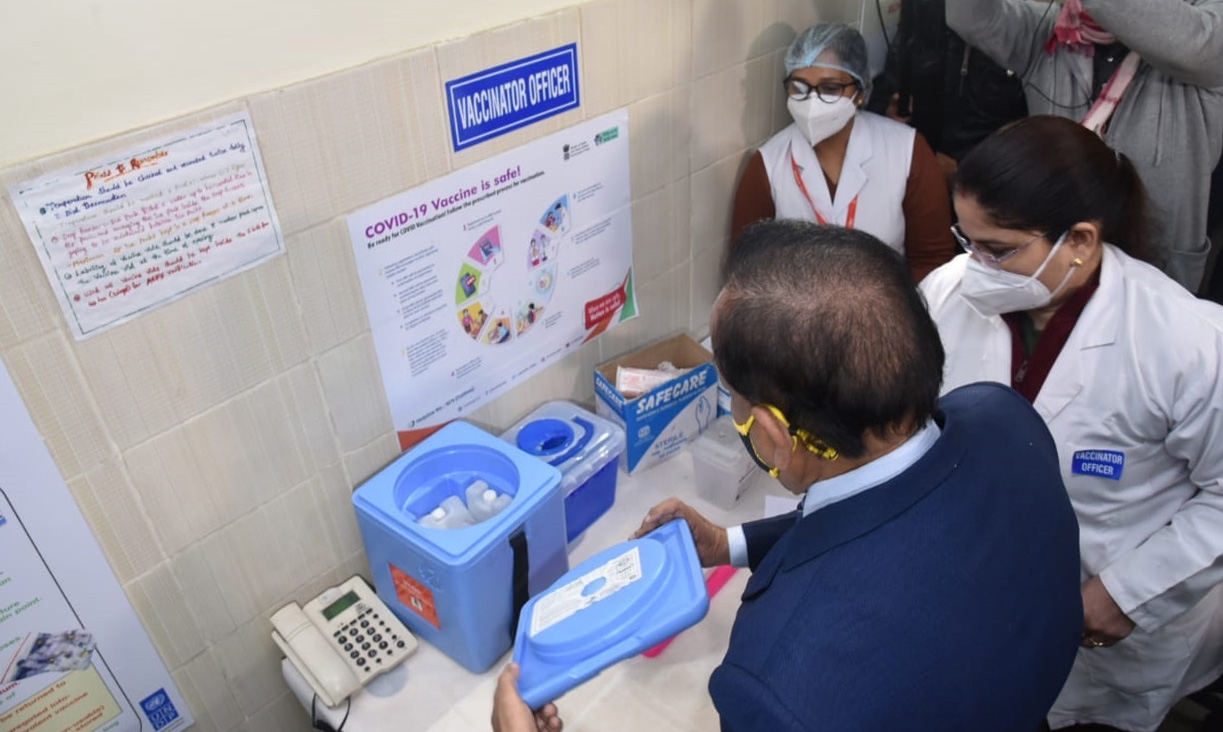
Union Minister for Health & Family Welfare, Dr. Harsh Vardhan visiting the GTB Hospital, Shahdara to review the preparedness of Dry Run of COVID-19 vaccine, in Delhi on January 02, 2021.

=== Covishield ===
On 1 January 2021, the Drug Controller General of India, approved the emergency or conditional use of AstraZeneca's COVID-19 vaccine AZD1222 (marketed as Covishield). Covishield is developed by the University of Oxford and its spin-out company, Vaccitech. It's a viral vector vaccine based on replication-deficient Adenovirus that causes cold in Chimpanzees. It can be stored, transported and handled at normal refrigerated conditions (two-eight degrees Celsius/ 36-46 degrees Fahrenheit). It has a shelf-life of at least six months.

On 12 January 2021 first batches of Covishield vaccine was despatched from the Serum Institute of India.

=== Covaxin ===
On 2 January 2021, BBV152 (marketed as Covaxin), first indigenous vaccine, developed by Bharat Biotech in association with the Indian Council of Medical Research and National Institute of Virology received approval from the Drug Controller General of India for its emergency or conditional usage.

On 14 January 2021 first batches of Covaxin vaccine was despatched from the Bharat Biotech, albeit it was still in the third phase of testing.

=== Others ===
On 19 May 2021, Dr Reddy's Labs received Emergency Use Authorisation for anti-COVID drug 2-DG. On 21 February 2022, Drugs Controller General of India granted approval to Biological E's COVID-19 vaccine Corbevax, that can be used for children between 12 and 18 years of age.

On 21 October 2021, India completed administering of one billion Covid vaccines in the country.

On 8 January 2022, India crossed 1.5 billion Covid vaccines milestone in the country.

On 19 February 2022, India crossed 1.75 billion Covid vaccines milestone in the country.

== See also ==
- COVID-19 pandemic in India
- COVID-19 pandemic
