= Suchitra Ella =

Indian business executive

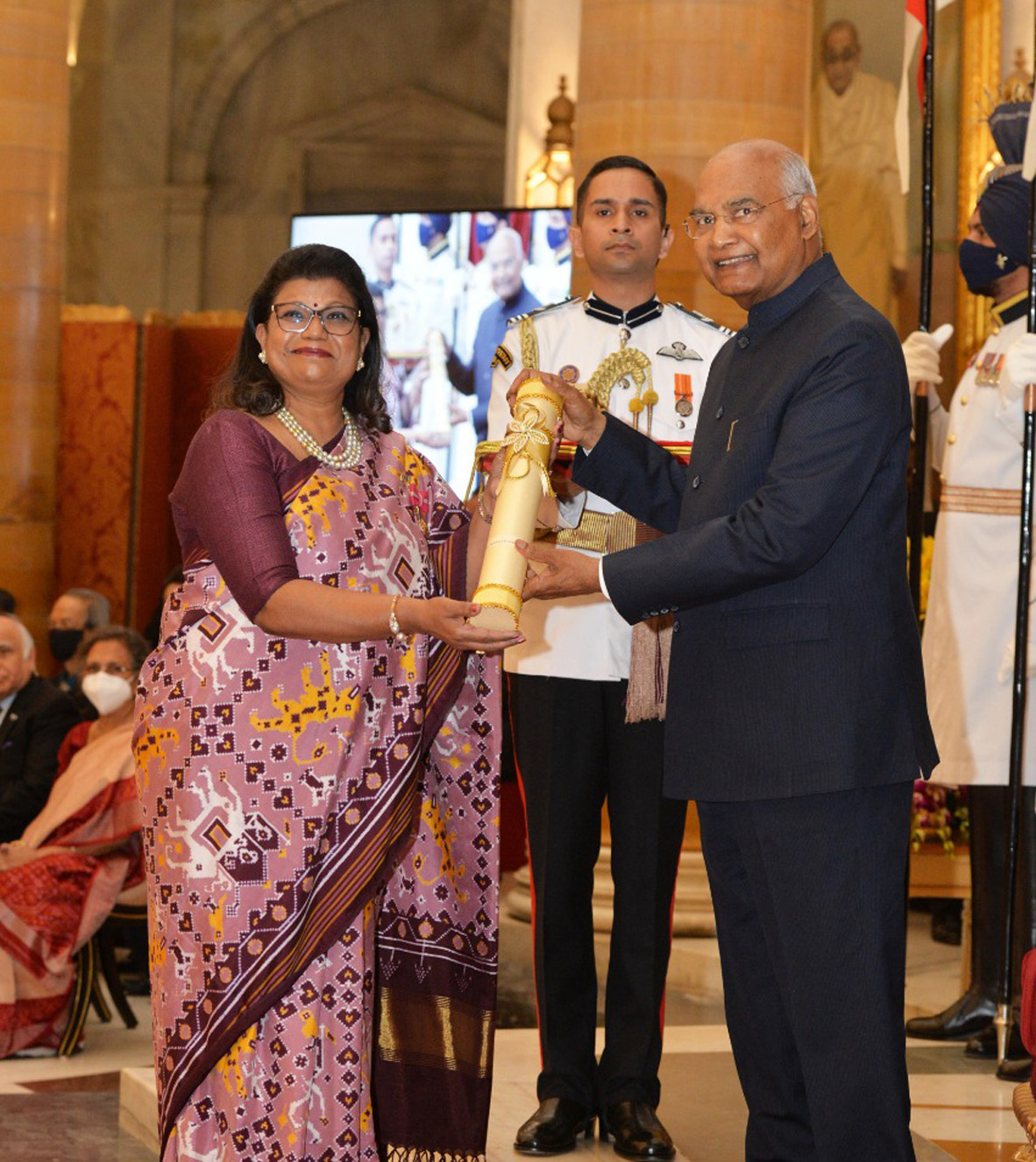
- Suchitra Ella receiving the Padma Bhushan, 2022
- Education: University of Madras (B.A.)
- Occupation: Business executive
- Years active: 1996–present
- Employer: Bharat Biotech
- Known for: Co-founding Bharat Biotech
- Title: Managing Director
- Awards: Padma Bhushan (2022)

Suchitra Ella is an Indian business executive and the joint managing director and co-founder of Bharat Biotech, an Indian biotechnology company founded in 1996. She was awarded the Padma Bhushan in 2022, along with her husband Krishna Ella, for contributions to industry.

== See also ==
- Bharat Biotech
- Padma Bhushan
- COVID-19 vaccination in India
