= Genome Valley =

- Life Sciences
- Country: India
- State: Telangana
- City: Hyderabad
- District: Medchal-Malkajgiri district
- Established: 22 November 1999; 27 years ago
- Founder: N. Chandrababu Naidu

Area
  - Total: 8.1 km^{2} (3.1 sq mi)
- Website: lifesciences.telangana.gov.in/life-sciences-grid/clusters/genome-valley/ genomevalley.co www.mnpark.in www.ikpknowledgepark.com www.innopolis-gv.com

Genome Valley is an Indian high-technology business district spread across 2,000-acre (8.1 km^{2})/(3.1 sq mi) in Hyderabad, India. It is located across the suburbs Turakapally, Shamirpet, Medchal, Uppal, Patancheru, Jeedimetla, Gachibowli and Keesara. The Genome Valley has developed as a cluster for Biomedical research, training and manufacturing. Genome Valley is now into its Phase III, which is about 11 km from the Phase I and II with the total area approximately 2,000-acre (8.1 km^{2}).

== History ==
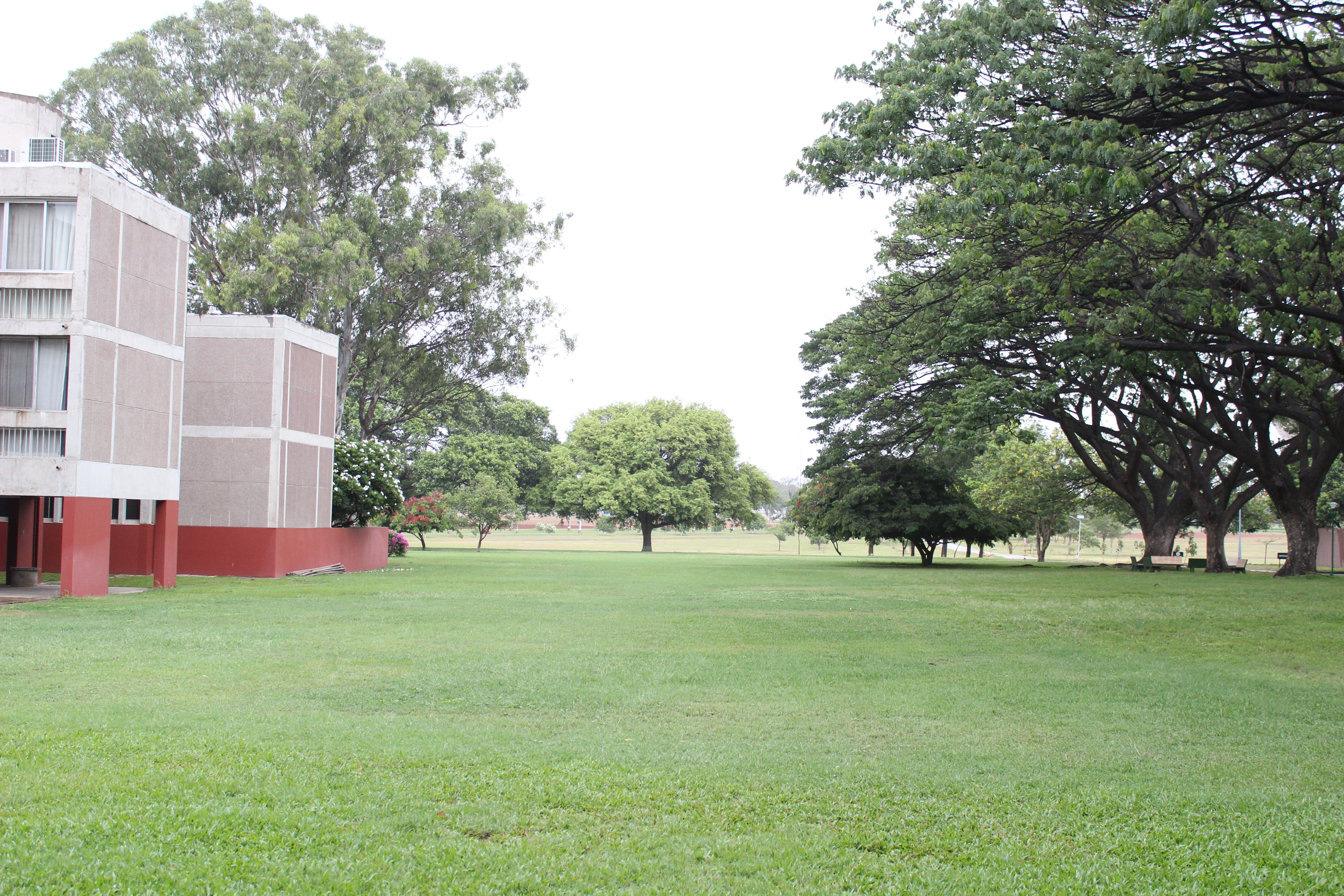
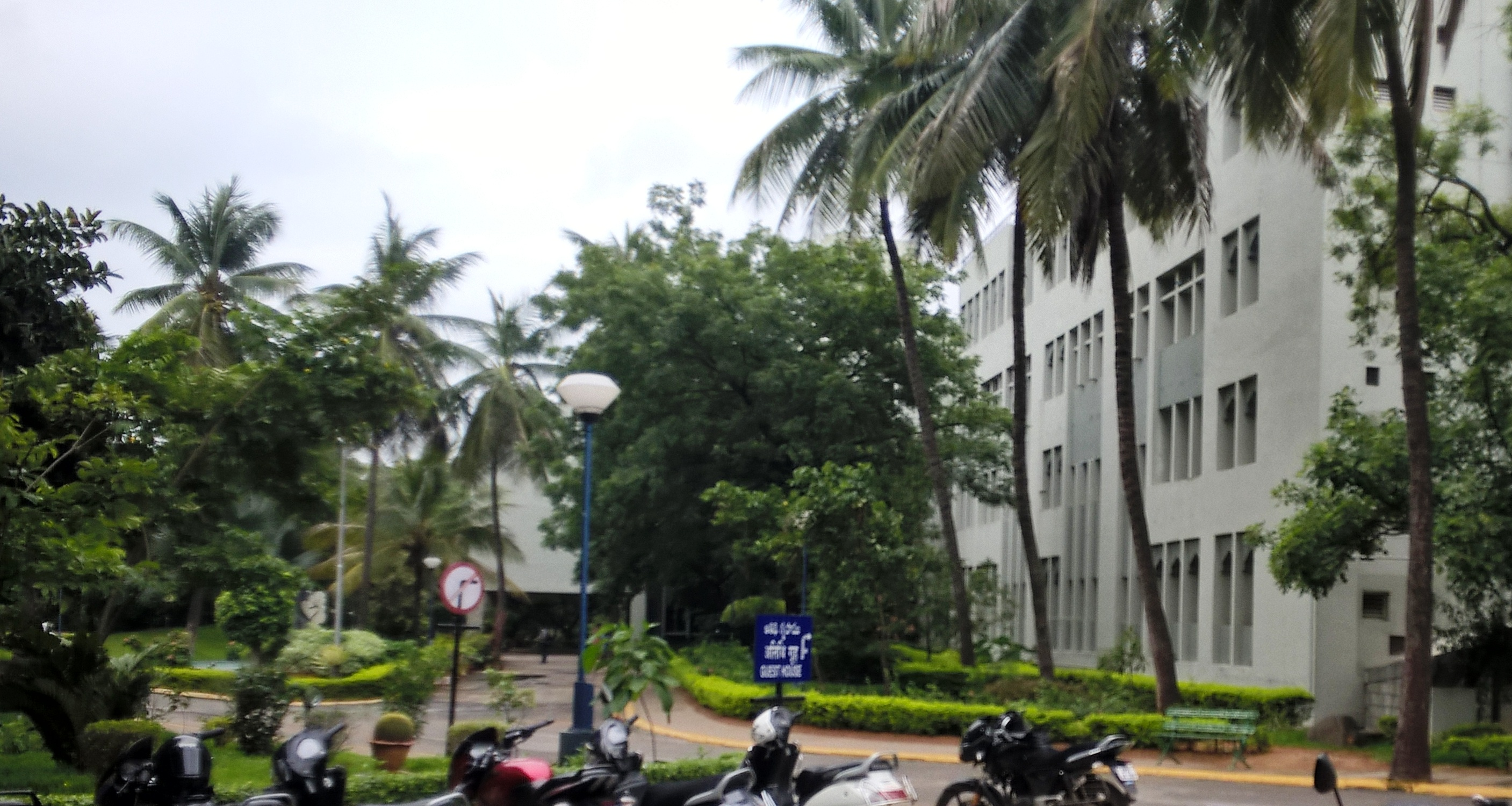
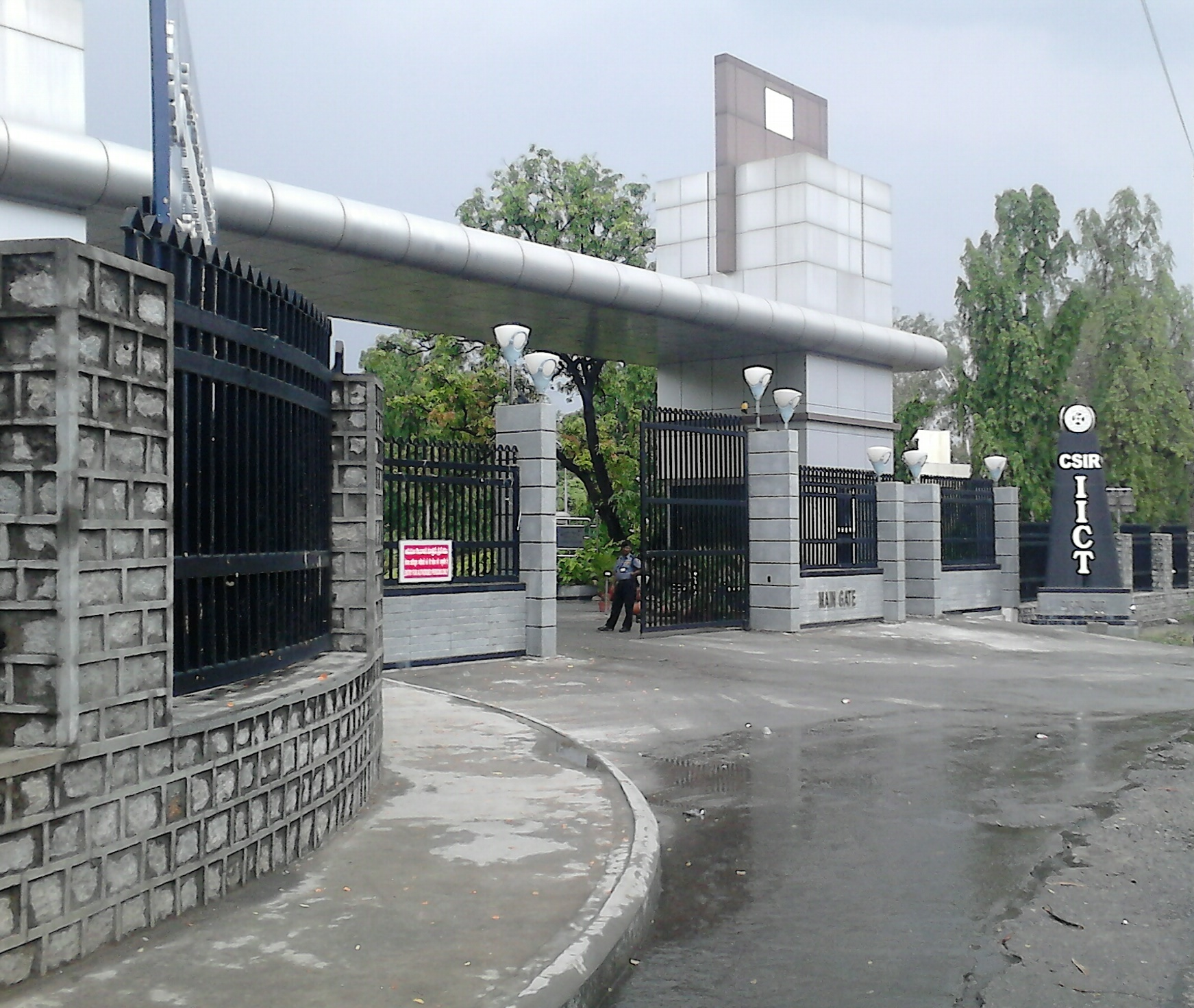
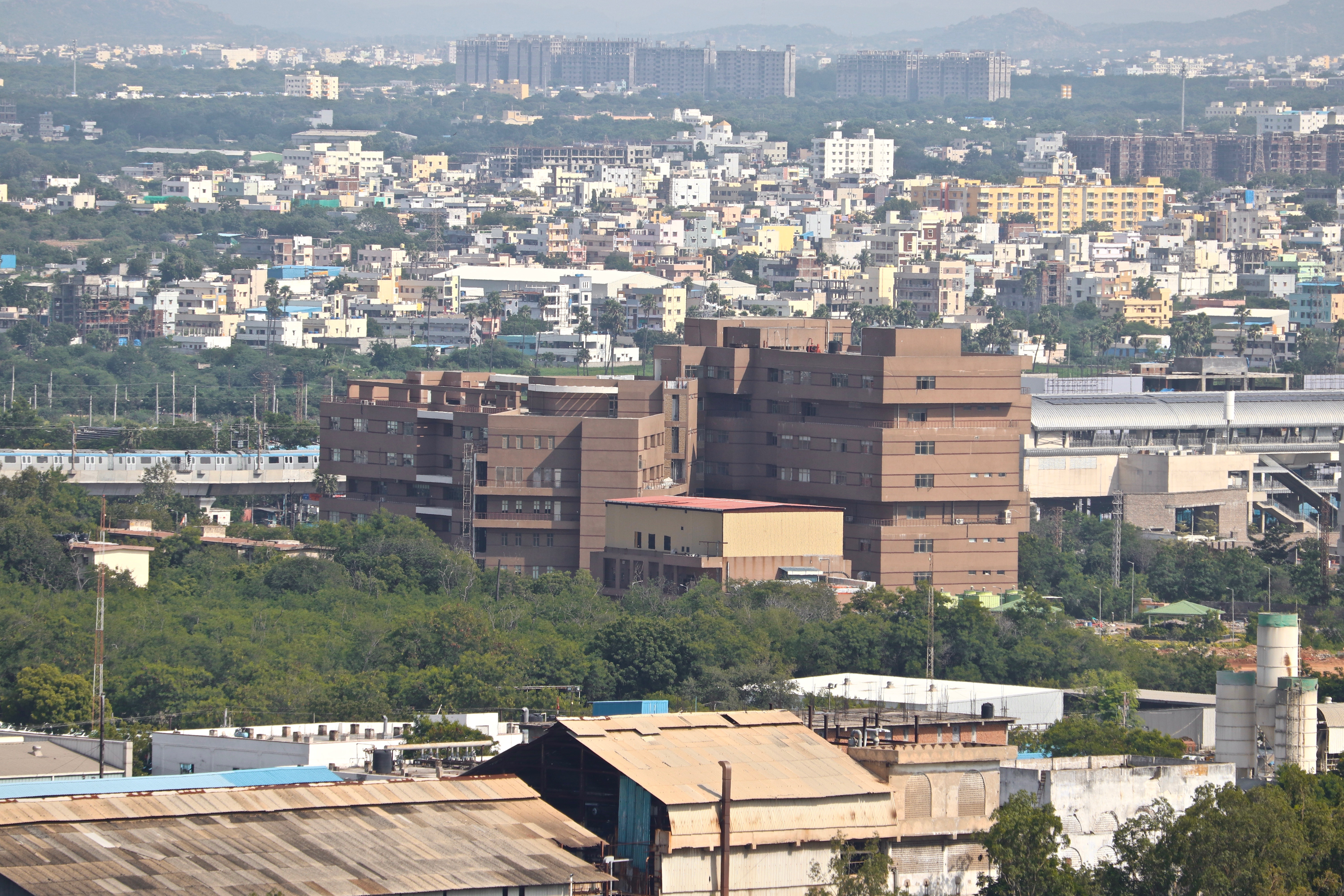
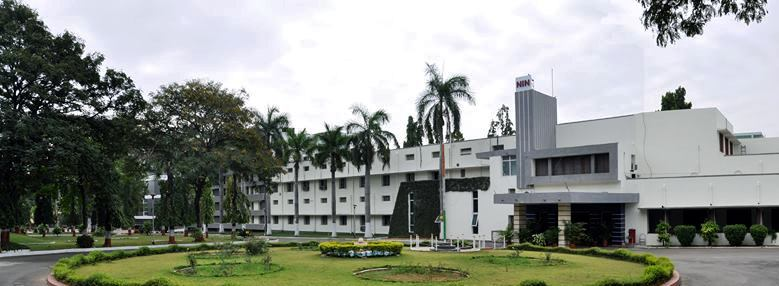
Clockwise from upper left:
- ICRISAT, CCMB, IICT, CDFD, NIN
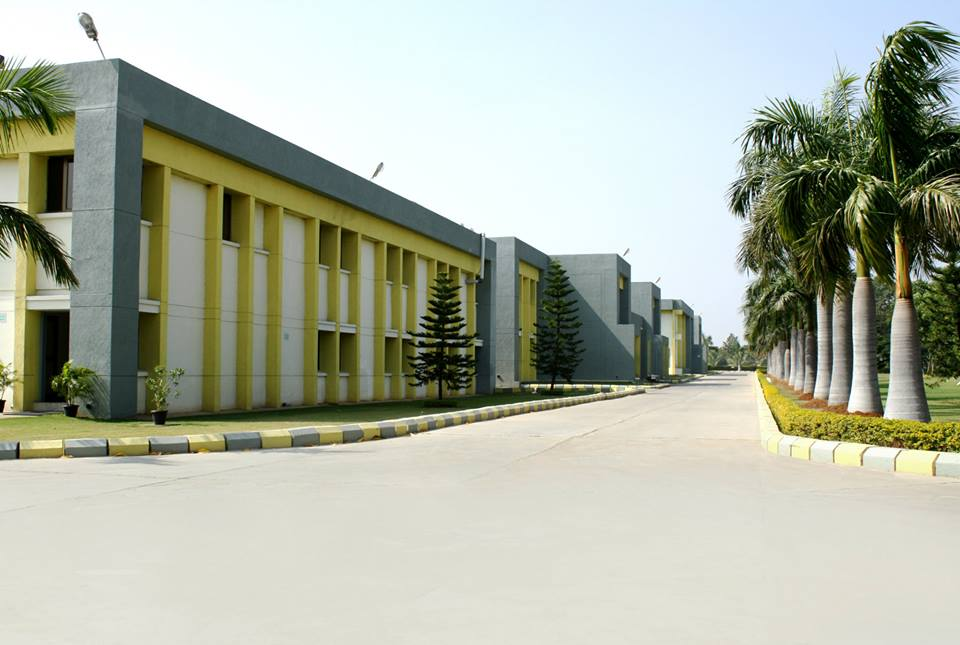
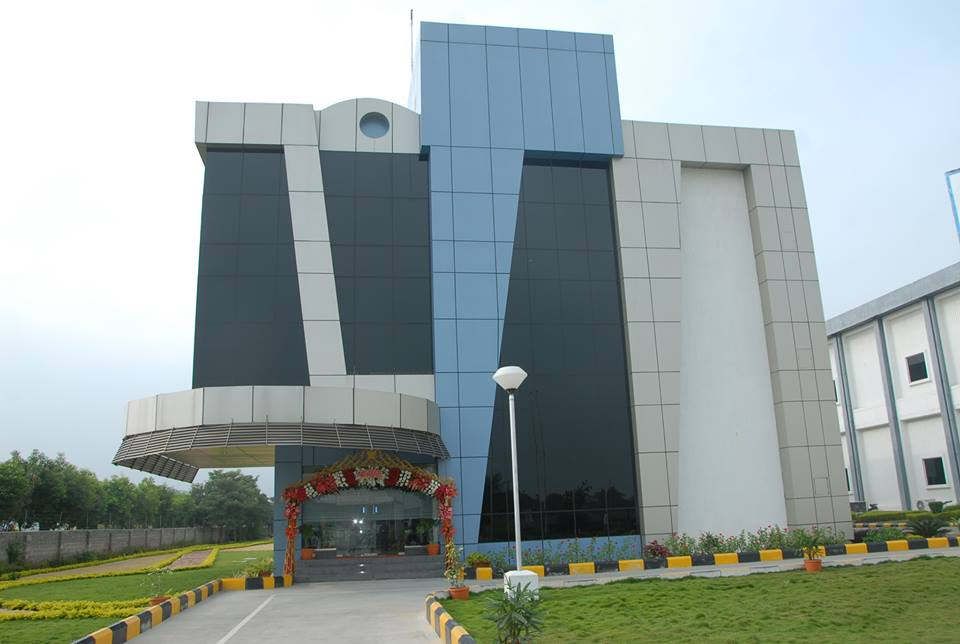
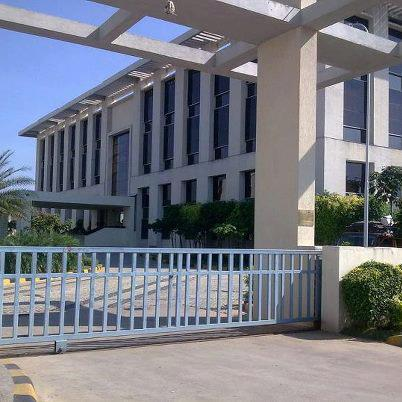
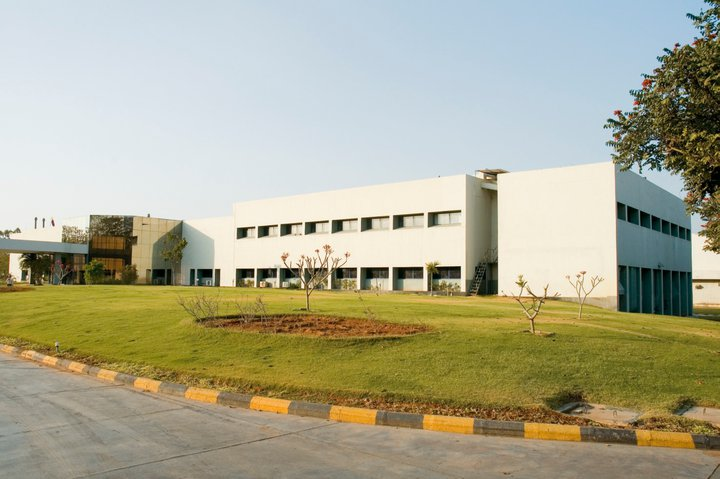
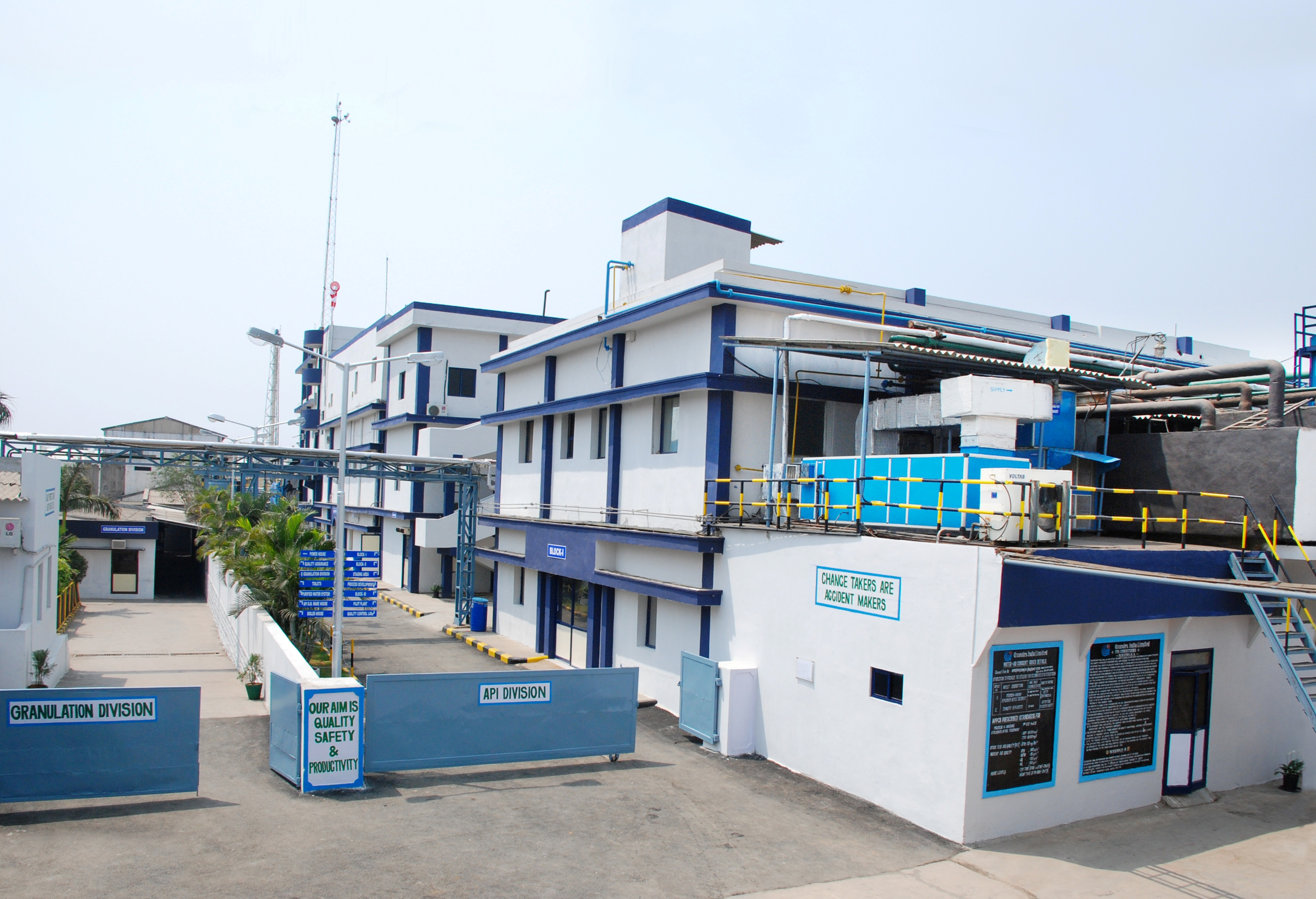
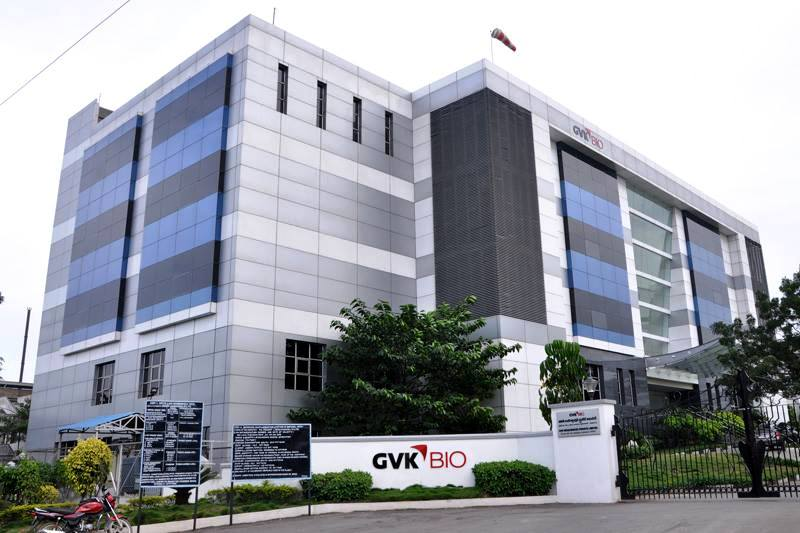
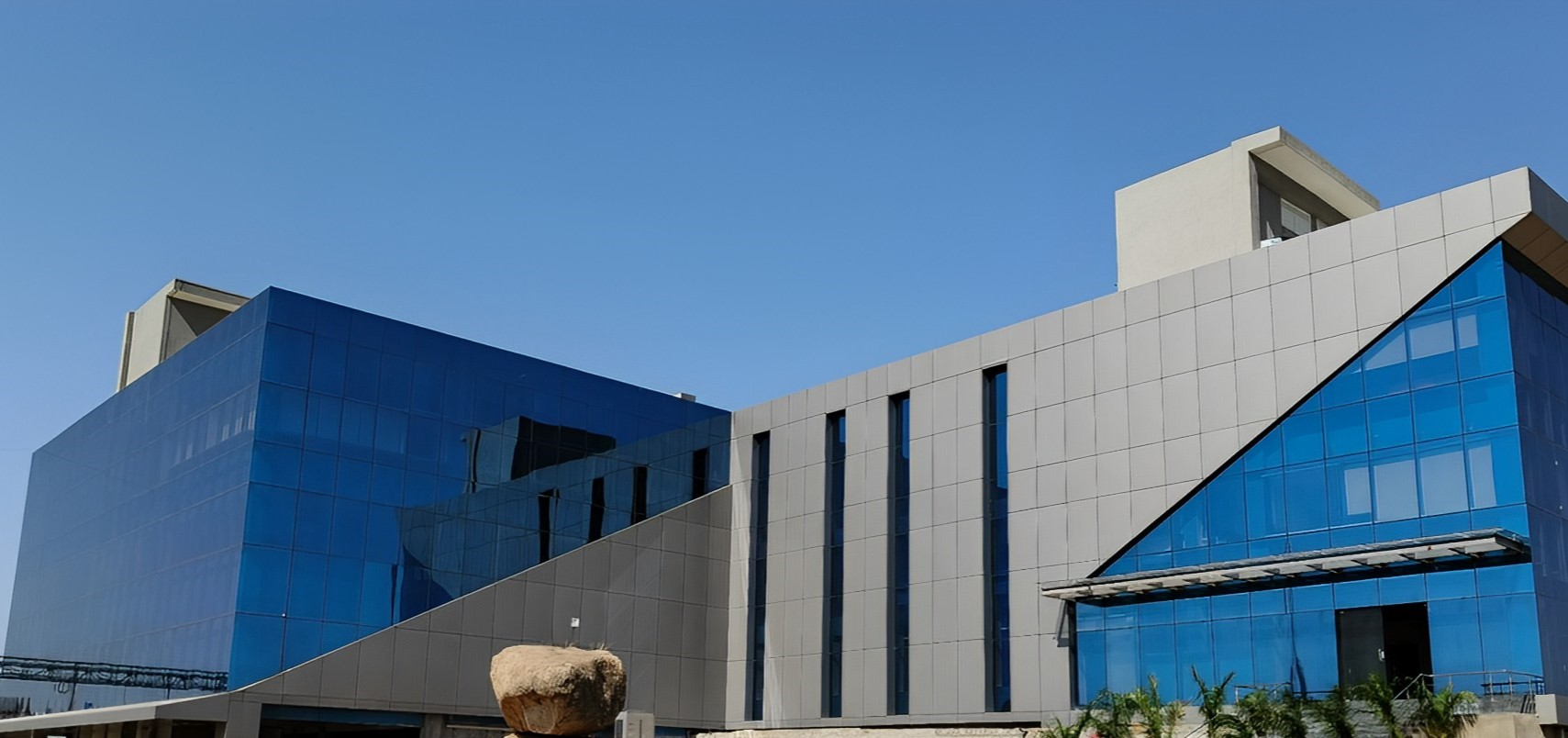
Clockwise from upper left:
- Biopharma manufacturing unit of Bharat Biotech near the Biocluster
- Biopharma manufacturing unit of Shantha Biotechnics near the Biocluster
- Biopharma Finished Dosage Unit of Dr. Reddy's Laboratories
- GVK Biosciences
- API manufacturing unit of Granules India Limited in Jeedimetla
- Vimta Labs Life Sciences Center near the Biocluster
- Itaan Pharma Private Ltd unit near Karkapatla

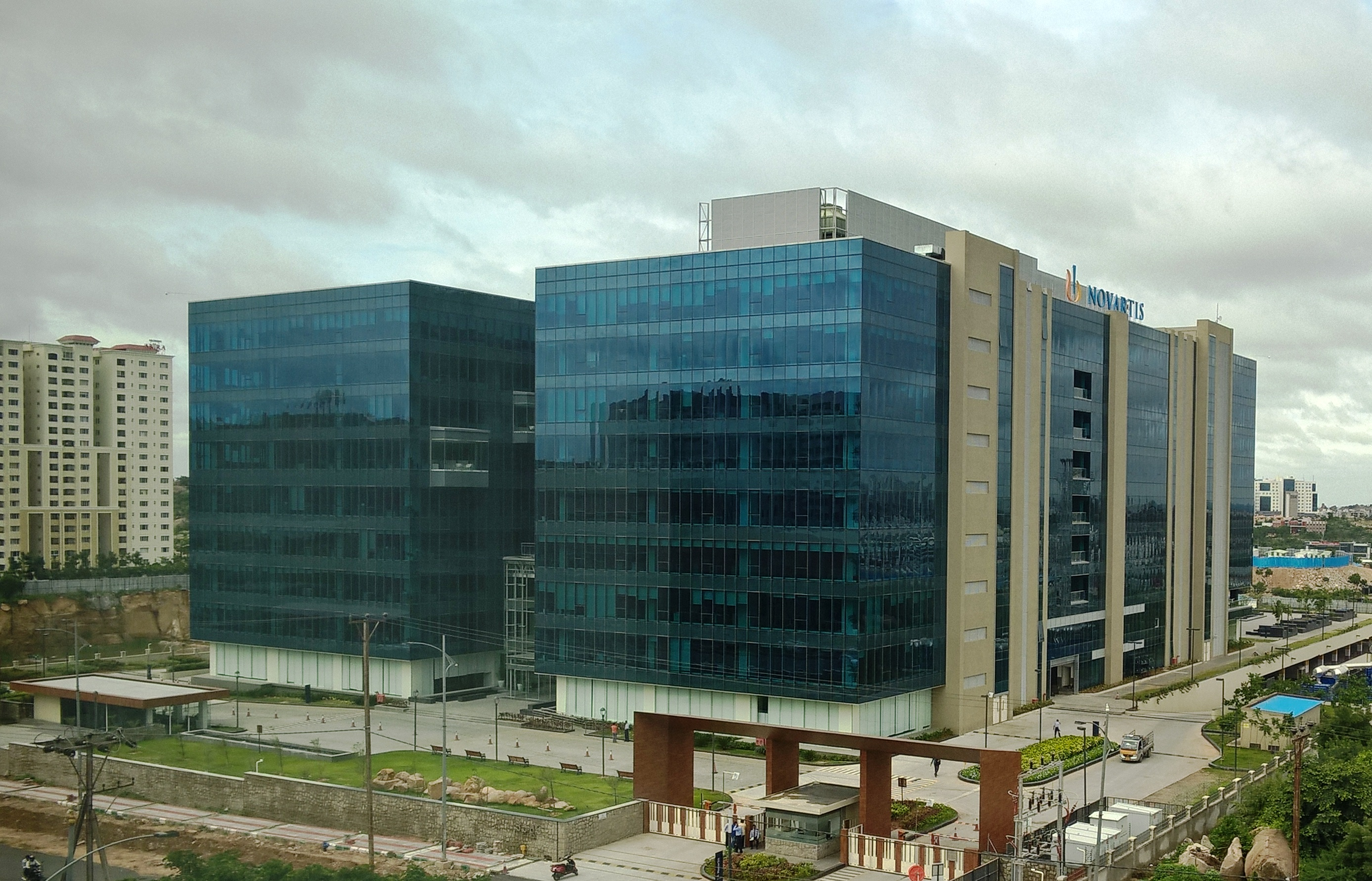
Novartis India headquarters

The concept of Genome Valley was envisioned by Dr. Krishna Ella, the founder of Bharat Biotech. He proposed the idea of creating a dedicated biotech hub that would bring together research, development, and manufacturing facilities in the life sciences sector. The realization of Genome Valley as a world-class biotech hub was driven by the efforts of N. Chandrababu Naidu, the then Chief Minister of Andhra Pradesh (before the bifurcation of the state into Andhra Pradesh and Telangana).

Genome Valley was commissioned by the then combined Government Andhra Pradesh in 1999 as S. P. Biotech Park in a public-private partnership with Bharat Biotech International, and its founder Krishna Ella, alongside private infrastructure companies such as Shapoorji Pallonji Group and ICICI Bank.

=== Alexandria Knowledge Park SEZ ===
In 2009, U.S.-based infrastructure giant Alexandria Real Estate Equities has announced its plans to invest in the bio-cluster, which led to the Alexandria Knowledge Park SEZ. The bio-cluster at Shamirpet holds Certification mark by the United States Patent and Trademark Office and the European Union.

=== IKP Knowledge Park ===
The IKP Knowledge Park is spread over 200 acres in Turakapally, is an initiative of ICICI Bank with five "innovation corridors" - a first of its kind knowledge-nurturing centre for Indian companies and a knowledge gateway for multinational companies". The first phase of Innovation Corridor I, comprising 10 laboratories, around 3,000 ft² (300 m²) each, is operational and fully occupied. The second phase of Innovation Corridor I, comprising 16 laboratory modules of 1,700 ft² (170 m²) each, is ready for operation.

== Growth ==
=== Neovantage Innovation Parks ===
In 2016, Mission Neutral Park acquired specialized R&D assets in Genome Valley from U.S.-based Alexandria REIT and rechristened it as MN Park. It was later rebranded as Neovantage Innovation Parks in 2023. Neovantage Innovation Parks is a collaborative life sciences ecosystem in Genome Valley, Hyderabad consisting of Grade A R&D facilities.

Neovantage Innovation Parks is spread over 1,000,000 sq ft of space, including built-up facilities of around 850,000 sq.ft. provided to global tenants like Novartis, GlaxoSmithKline, Mylan and Ashland Inc. The campuses consist of pre-leased industrial assets and specialized office spaces to sectors including specialized warehousing, vaccine development, CROs, Bio-Pharma Production, pharmaceutical R&D etc.

=== Big Pharma and Global Capability Centers ===
- Novartis
- Sandoz
- Roche
- Bristol Myers Squibb
- Amgen
- Eli Lilly and Company
- Sanofi
- Johnson & Johnson
- Bayer
- Baxter
- Merck & Co.
- United States Pharmacopeia
- Lonza Group
- GSK plc
- Dr. Reddy's Laboratories
- Aurobindo Pharma

=== Contract Research ===
- Thermo Fisher Scientific
- Syneos Health
- PAREXEL
- IQVIA
- GlobalData
- Cytel

=== Clinical and Healthcare IT ===
- Oracle Corporation
- Veeva Systems
- Medidata Solutions
- Merative
- Accenture
- Tata Consultancy Services
- Infosys
- Wipro
- HCLTech
- Tech Mahindra
- LTIMindtree
- Clarivate
- Informa
- Optum
- Advarra

=== Manufacturing ===
- Dupont Knowledge Center
- Shantha Biotechnics, a Sanofi company
- Bharat Biotech International
- Divi's Laboratories
- Glukem Biocare Private Limited
- Itaan Pharma Private Limited
- Granules India Limited
- Biocon
- Bharat Biotech
- Biological E. Limited
- Neuland Laboratories
- BioServe Global
- Indian Drugs and Pharmaceuticals Limited
- Nuziveedu Seeds Private Limited
- Advanta India
- Monsanto
- Merck KGaA
- Makhteshim Agan
- Roche Diagnostics
- Mylan
- Medtronic
- Millipore
- Albany Molecular Research
- Biogenex International
- Nektar Therapeutics
- Avesthagen
- Virchow Biotech
- Phenomenex (chromatography company)
- Metropolis
- EPRCCRB - A Vitane group of companies

=== R & D ===
- International Crops Research Institute for the Semi-Arid Tropics
- Centre for Cellular and Molecular Biology
- Indian Institute of Chemical Technology
- Centre for DNA Fingerprinting and Diagnostics
- Birla Institute of Technology and Science, Pilani – Hyderabad Campus
- National Institute of Nutrition, Hyderabad
- National Animal Resource Facility for Biomedical Research
- National Institute of Animal Biotechnology
- Indian Immunologicals Limited
- National Institute of Pharmaceutical Education and Research, Hyderabad
- Sir Ronald Ross Institute of Parasitology
- Directorate of Rice and Oil Seeds Research
- Central Forensic Science Laboratory, Hyderabad
- Central Institute of Medicinal and Aromatic Plants
- L. V. Prasad Eye Institute
- National Academy of Agricultural Research Management
- Centre for Computational Natural Sciences and Bioinformatics, IIIT Hyderabad
- TCS Bioinformatics Innovation Lab, Hyderabad
- Dr. Reddy's Institute of Life Sciences
- Indo American Cancer Hospital and Research Institute
- Central Research Institute for Dry Land Agriculture
- Center For Sustainable Agriculture, Hyderabad
- Central Food Technology Research Institute - Resource Center
- Apollo Cell and Molecular Biology Research Center
- American Oncology Institute
- Asian Institute of Gastroenterology
- Owaisi Center for Liver Research and diagnostics
- Alembic
- Bharat Biotech
- RCC Laboratories

=== Small Biotechs ===
- Ocimum Biosolutions
- Excelra
- Laurus Labs
- Vimta Labs
- Enveda Therapeutics

== See also ==
- Hyderabad Pharma City
- Department of Biotechnology
- Pharmaceutical industry in India
