= Indian Drugs and Pharmaceuticals =

Indian Pharmaceutical company

Indian Drugs and Pharmaceuticals Limited
- Company type: Public sector undertaking
- Founded: 1961; 65 years ago
- Headquarters: New Delhi; Hyderabad; Gurgaon; Rishikesh
- Products: Drugs and pharmaceuticals
- Website: idplindia.in

Indian Drugs and Pharmaceuticals Limited (IDPL) was a public sector pharmaceutical, bulk drug manufacturing and drug discovery company owned by the Indian government, headquartered in New Delhi, and located in Hyderabad, Gurgaon and Rishikesh. The company was involved in patent development alongside, National Institute of Pharmaceutical Education and Research to provide affordable drugs, and had recently released three over the counter drugs.

A new formulation unit was inaugurated in Hyderabad in February 2017.

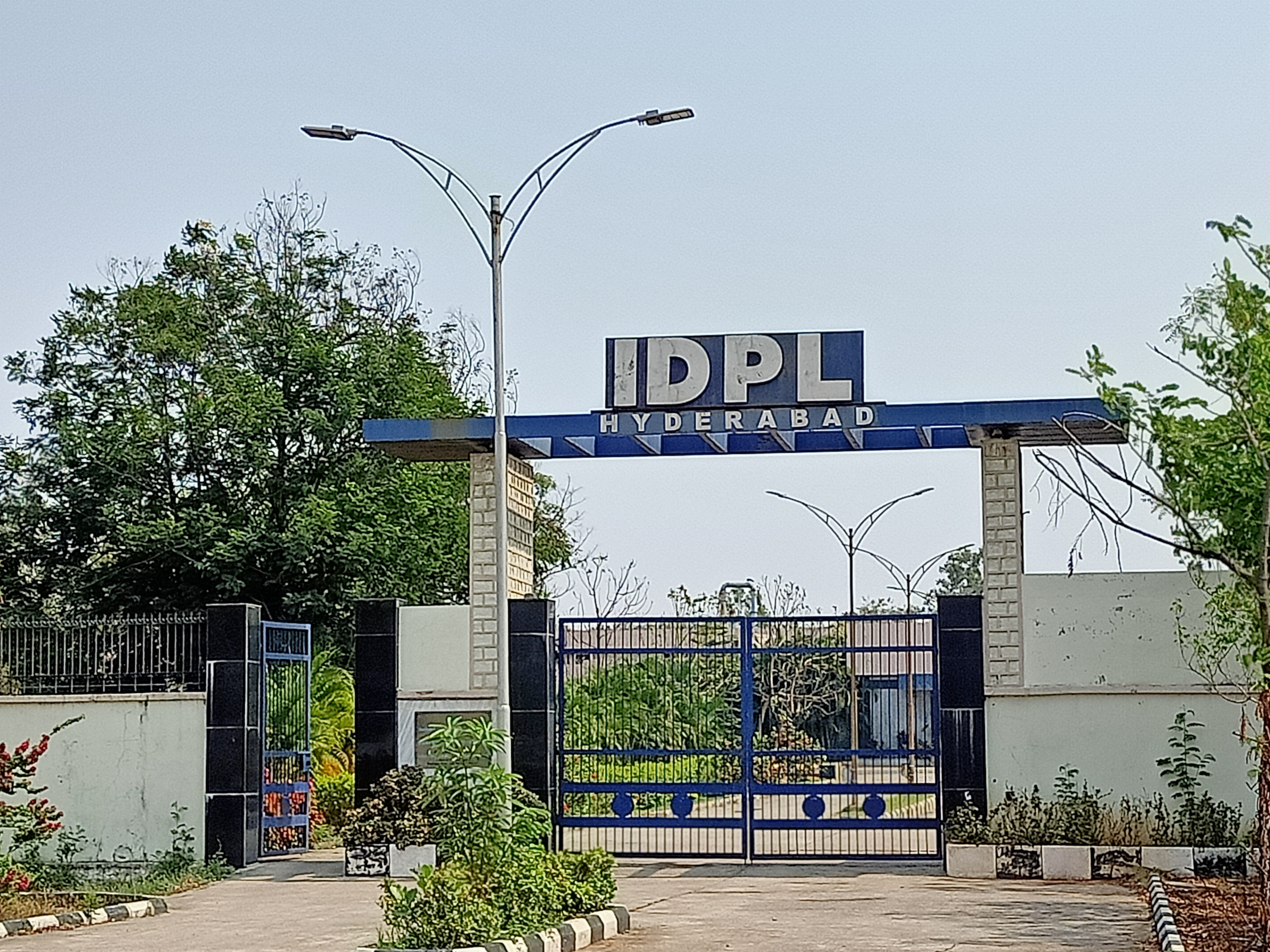
IDPL Hyderabad

Many attempts have been made to revive IDPL, declared sick by the Board for Industrial and Financial Reconstruction. The Government of India was exploring ways of strategically selling the unit and meet outstanding liabilities. On the 9th of February 2021, the Government of India announced the liquidation of IDPL.

== See also ==
- National Institute of Pharmaceutical Education and Research, Hyderabad
- Pharmaceuticals in India
- Dr. Reddy's Laboratories
- Genome Valley
