= Nuziveedu Seeds =

Indian agribusiness company

Nuziveedu Seeds Limited
- Company type: Limited Company
- Industry: Agribusiness
- Founded: 1973
- Headquarters: Hyderabad, India
- Key people: M. Prabhakara Rao
- Products: Seeds
- Revenue: Rs 1060 crores
- Website: Nuziveeduseed.com

Nuziveedu Seeds Ltd (originally established as a part of the NSL Group) is an Indian agribusiness company that provides agricultural and hybrid seed products, specialising in the production and development of:

- Field crops, such as cotton, maize, rice, sorghum, pearl millet (bajra), wheat, castor, sunflower and mustard.
- Vegetable crops, such as tomatoes, okra, hot peppers, melons, cabbage, cauliflower and gourds.

The company operates in 17 states and markets approximately 350 varieties of seed products to more than 5.5 million farmers across India.

The seeds business of the NSL Group was founded by Sri Mandava Venkatramaiah in 1973, who was a farmer in the Nuziveedu town of Andhra Pradesh with a postgraduate degree in agricultural sciences. He had an interest in cotton seed technology and understood the value in hybrid cotton seeds, which he wanted to make available to cotton cultivators.

However, this was created as a hobby and was later changed by Sri Venkataramaiah's son, Mr M Prabhakar Rao, who took over the seeds business of the NSL Group in 1982. Under his leadership, Nuziveedu Seeds became the largest hybrid seed company in India (in terms of volumes of Bt cotton seed packets sold between 2009 and 2010). M Prabhakar Rao is currently also President of the National Seed Association of India (NSAI)

== Awards ==
- Department of Scientific and Industrial Research Award

== See also ==
- Genome Valley
- Pharmaceutical industry in India
