= K. I. Varaprasad Reddy =

Indian businessperson

K I Varaprasad Reddy
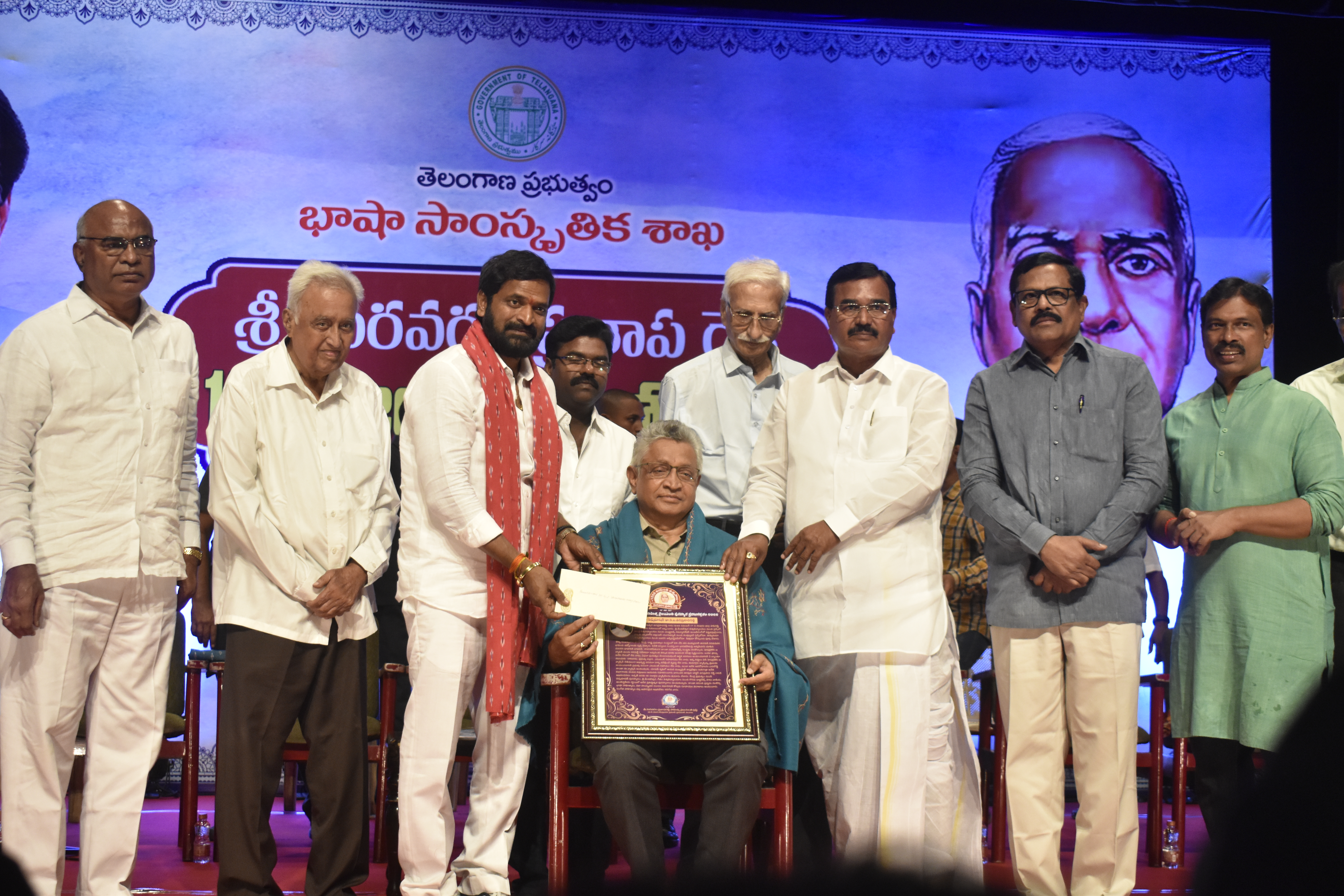
- Born: 17 November 1948 (age 77); Papireddy Palem, Nellore district, Andhra Pradesh, India
- Occupation: Chairman of Shanta Biotechnics
- Known for: Founder of vaccine manufacturing company Shantha Biotechnics
- Parents: Venkata Ramana Reddy (father); Shantamma (mother)
- Awards: Padma Bhushan

Koduru Ishwara Varaprasad Reddy (born 17 November 1948) is an Indian entrepreneur and founder of vaccine manufacturing company Shantha Biotechnics, which developed the first recombinant vaccine in India. The Govt of India awarded him the Padma Bhushan award in 2005 for his contribution in the fields of science and engineering. He received an honorary doctorate from Sri Venkateshwara University, Gitam University, and Vignan University for his pioneering efforts.

== Early life ==
K.I Varaprasad Reddy was born in an agriculture family from Papireddy Palem village in Nellore district. He was the only child of his parents Venkata Ramana Reddy and Shanthamma.

He earned a Bachelor of Science degree from Sri Venkateshwara University in 1967, and studied Engineering (Electronics & Communication) at Andhra University, finishing in 1970. He pursued a Diploma in Computer Sciences from Biblingen University, West Germany in 1971. He earned his master's degree in Business Administration from Osmania University.

== Career ==
An electronics engineer by profession, Varaprasad worked as a defense scientist for 7 years. He then worked at Andhra Pradesh Industrial Development Corporation. He became an entrepreneur, joining Hyderabad Batteries Ltd in 1985. This company developed and produced batteries for high technology batteries for defence applications.

=== Shantha Biotechnics Limited ===
In 1990, he attended a WHO conference and heard others claim that India was not capable of developing a vaccine for Hepatitis B. The disease kills around 350,000 people every year in the country. He started Shantha Biotechnics Ltd in response in 1993, with a mission to produce cost-effective vaccines that would be available for the common man, while still maintaining international quality standards.

Shantha Biotechnics Ltd developed India's first indigenously developed recombinant hepatitis B vaccine. The Shanvac-B vaccine was launched in 1997.

== Other activities ==
He supported yoga, training many yoga teachers. He launched a magazine, Haasam, and it ran for 5 years. The main aim was to propagate the spirit of Telugu art, literature, humour, and music. Haasam Publications published many books on music, humour, and spirituality. Successful projects include Autobiography of Bharta Ratna M S Subbulakshmi and Mullapudi Venkataramana's Kothi Kommachi.

== Recognition ==
- Life Time Achievement Award (2018) - HMTV Business Excellence Awards.
