= Shantha Biotechnics =

Indian biotechnology company and vaccine manufacturer

Shantha Biotechnics Limited
- Type: Subsidiary
- Industry: Biotechnology
- Founded: 1993; 33 years ago
- Founder: K. I. Varaprasad Reddy
- Headquarters: Medchal, Telangana, India
- Key people: K. I. Varaprasad Reddy (chairman); Harish Iyer (CEO)
- Products: Recombinant DNA Vaccines
- Parent: Sanofi
- Website: Shanthabiotech.com

Shantha Biotechnics Limited is an Indian biotechnology company headquartered in Hyderabad, India. It is the first Indian company to develop, manufacture, and market recombinant human healthcare products in India. The company is a wholly owned subsidiary of the Sanofi group.

Shantha Biotechnics caters to major international markets including Asia-Pacific, Africa, Commonwealth of Independent States, and Latin America in addition to international organisations UNICEF and PAHO.

== History ==
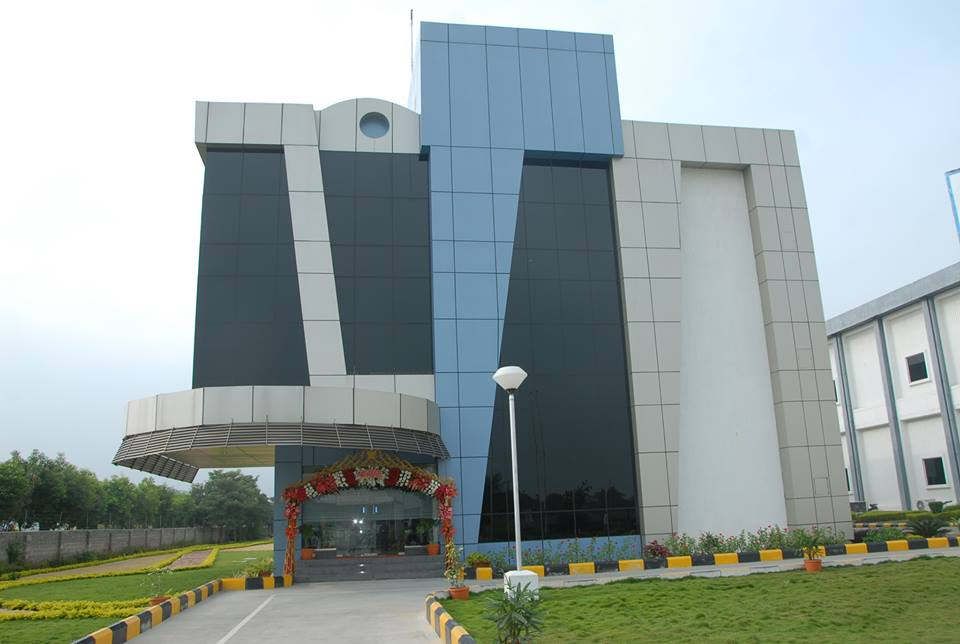
The manufacturing facility of Shantha Biotechnics near the Genome Valley

Shantha Biotechnics, Ltd. began with the initiatives of Dr. K. I. Varaprasad Reddy. Varaprasad established the company in 1993 to produce affordable drugs for the general population, while maintaining international standards in quality. The project originated as an R&D project at Osmania University under the industry-university interactive programme in 1993, and later operated from the Center for Cellular and Molecular Biology until an independent research and development facility was built.

In 2006, the European biotech major Mérieux Alliance bought a 60% stake in Shantha Biotechnics at a valuation of $175 million.

In 2009, the vaccine division of French pharmaceutical company Sanofi Pasteur acquired the stake held by Mérieux Alliance, valuing Shantha Biotech at Euro 550 million (over Rs 3,770 crore).

Over time, Sanofi acquired a further stake in Shantha Biotechnics and, in 2013, acquired 100% of the company.

== Products ==
Drugs developed by Shantha include SHANVAC-B, SHANFERON, SHANKINASE, SHANPOIETIN, pediatric combination vaccines Shantetra and Shan5, SHAN HIB-DPT, SHAN HIB, and SHANTT.

== Insuman cartridges project ==
The main object of the Insuman Cartridges Project is to produce insulin at a lower cost. It is in Medak district, Telangana. The project cost is ₹ 460 crore.

== See also ==
- Genome Valley
