= Andhra Pradesh Medtech Zone =

Technology park in Nadupuru, Visakhapatnam, India

Coordinates: 17.627469°N 83.161453°E

Andhra Pradesh Medtech Zone (AMTZ)
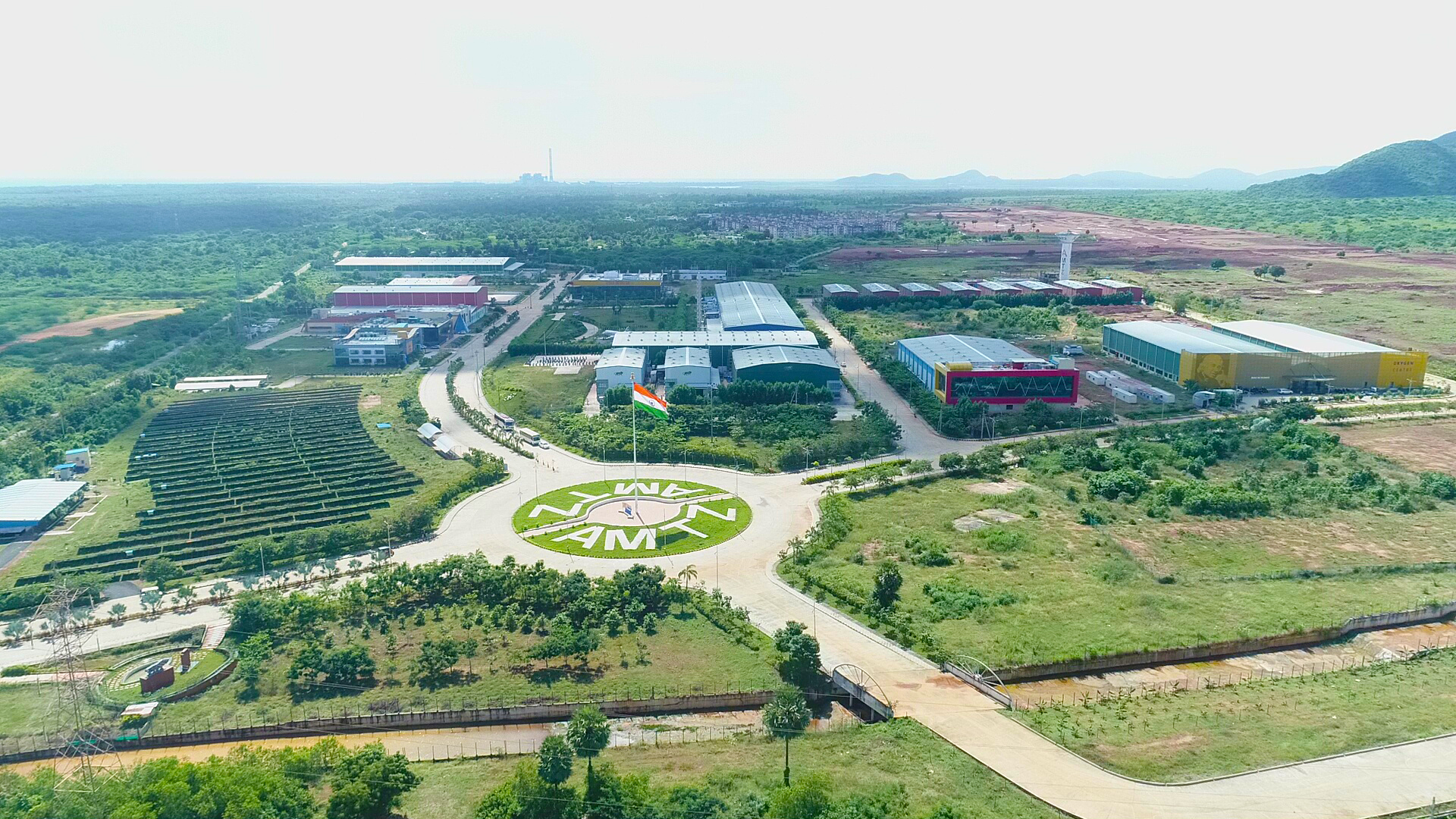
- Industry: Medical
- Founded: 19 August 2016
- Headquarters: Visakhapatnam, Andhra Pradesh, India
- Key people: Dr Jitendra Sharma (Managing Director Founder CEO)
- Owner: Ap government
- Number of employees: 300
- Website: www.amtz.in

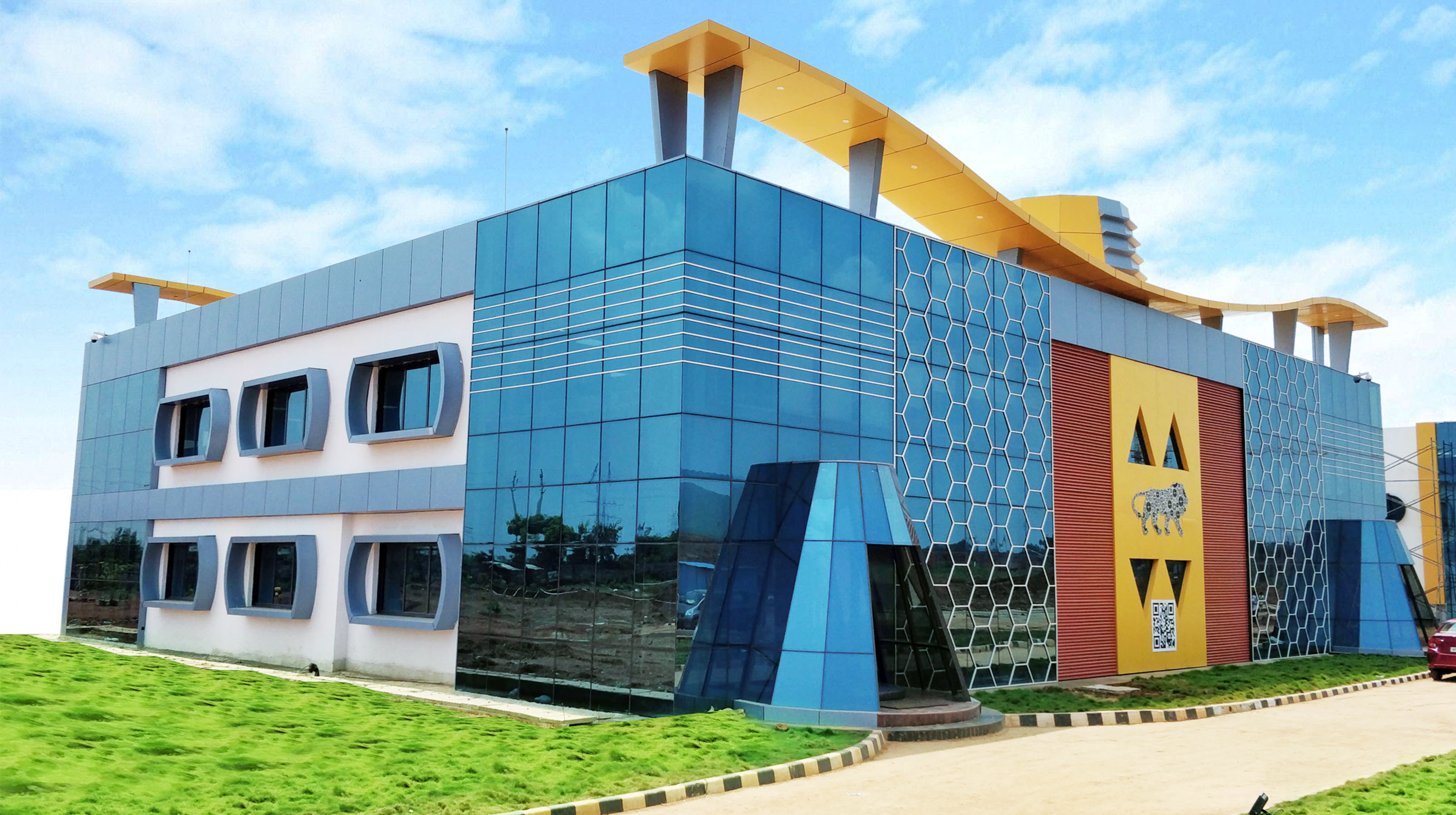
AMTZ Administrative office

Andhra Pradesh MedTech Zone (AMTZ) is the medical technology park with Common Manufacturing Facilities & Common Scientific Facilities located in Nadupuru village area of Visakhapatnam, adjacent to the Visakhapatnam Steel Plant. The AMTZ is spread over an area of 270 acres and it has over 10 manufacturing units.

It currently houses the Bio Valley Incubation Council, funded by the Department of Biotechnology, and the Kalam Institute of Health Technology. In April 2020, the AMTZ has started making rapid testing kits for COVID-19 and planned to start the manufacture of ventilators.

It Established as the country's first such facility, it played a significant role during the COVID-19 pandemic by supplying equipment including oxygen concentrators, ventilators, and RT-PCR kits. The initiative is led by its founder CEO, Dr. Jitendra Sharma.

== History ==
Andhra Pradesh MedTech Zone (AMTZ) was first conceptualised in November 2015 as India's first medical device park. The initiative was spreadheaded by the then Chief Minister of Andhra Pradesh, N. Chandrababu Naidu, following a series of discussions with representatives from the Indian medical device industry, as well as state and union government officials.

The project was formally incorporated as a government enterprise on 30 April 2016, and the foundation stone was laid by Chief Minister N. Chandrababu Naidu on 19 August 2016 at Nadupur village in Visakhapatnam. The state government facilitated the project by providing the 270 acre site and implementing a single window clearance system to streamline industrial development.

== Hosting World Class Labs ==
The key USPs of the campus are its Common Scientific Industrial Laboratories such as the center for Electromagnetic compatibility and safety testing, Center for Biomaterial Testing, Center for 3-D printing, Centers for Lasers, MRI coils, Gamma Irradiation, Moulding, and many other industrial service centers.

When the pandemic outbreak happened, there were no standard specifications for the essential products for the fight against the pandemic, and India was majorly dependent on imports for ventilators, PPE Kits, N-95 Masks and so on. Today when the nation has emerged as the second-largest PPE manufacturer in the world and has grown self-sufficient in ventilators and N-95 masks, the role played by AMTZ .

=== BIOME: Centre for biomaterial testing ===
- The state-of-the-art laboratory for Biomaterials at AMTZ, is operated by service provider M/s TUV Rheinland has the following testing capabilities
1. Sterility Evaluation
2. Histopathology Evaluation
3. Physiochemical Evaluation
4. Accelerated Aging
5. Package Validation
- This facility is primarily intended for medical device industry for physio-chemical evaluation as well as biological evaluation of sample.
- Industries like Chemical, Polymer and Pharmaceuticals etc. can also avail this facility to evaluate the characteristics of materials using spectroscopic and imaging modalities like SEM, TEM etc.
- Number of days for completion of construction is 178 days.

=== ELECTRA: Centre for electromagnetic compatibility (EMC) & safety testing ===
- This facility is operated by M/s TUV Rheinland for EMC and Safety testing and certification of medical devices

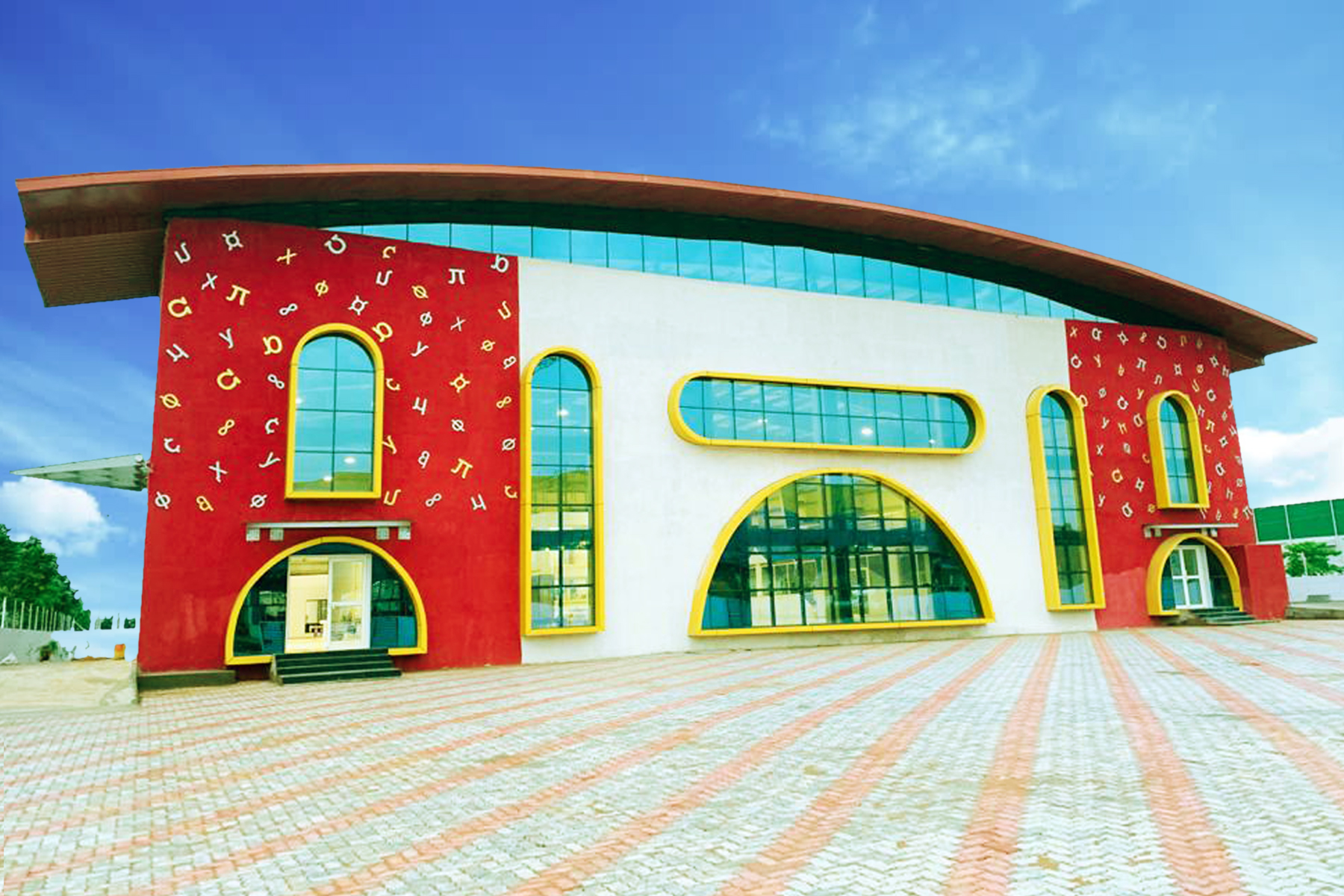
COBALTA - Center for Gamma Irradiation

=== COBALTA: Center for Gamma Irradiation ===
- The centre for Gamma Irradiation at AMTZ is first of its kind in Andhra Pradesh and the surrounding states and would cater to 15% (INR 4500 Crore) of the Indian Medical Device market.

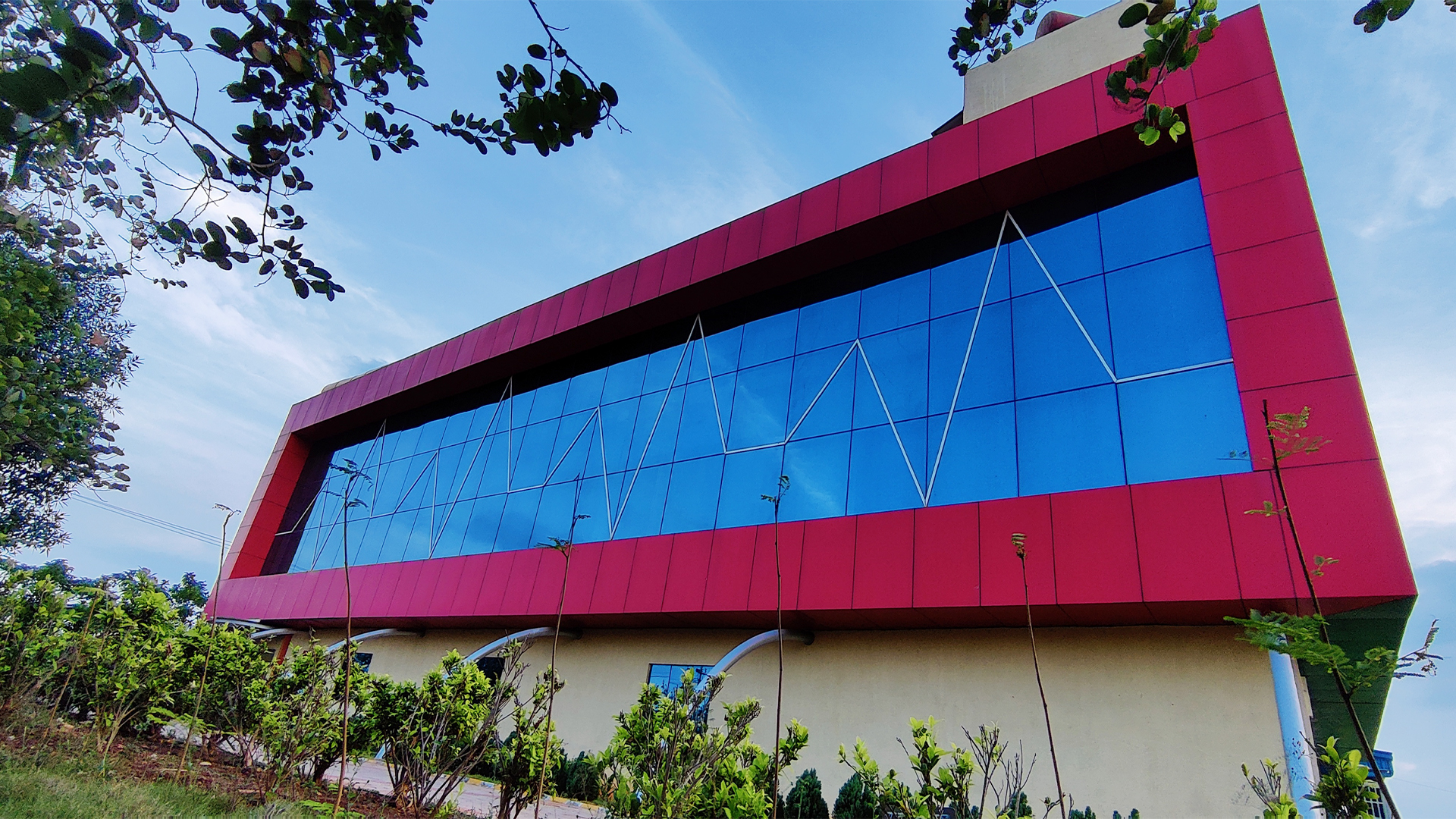
DIODE: Super Conducting Magnet

=== DIODE: Super Conducting Magnet ===
The superconducting magnet is the largest and most expensive component of an MRI system. Magnetic Resonance Imaging (MRI), a powerful medical diagnostic tool, is the largest commercial application of superconductivity. The magnet configuration is determined by competing requirements including optimized functional performance, patient comfort, ease of sitting in a hospital environment, minimum acquisition and lifecycle cost including service.

DIODE would be the first facility in India to manufacture an MRI superconducting magnet.

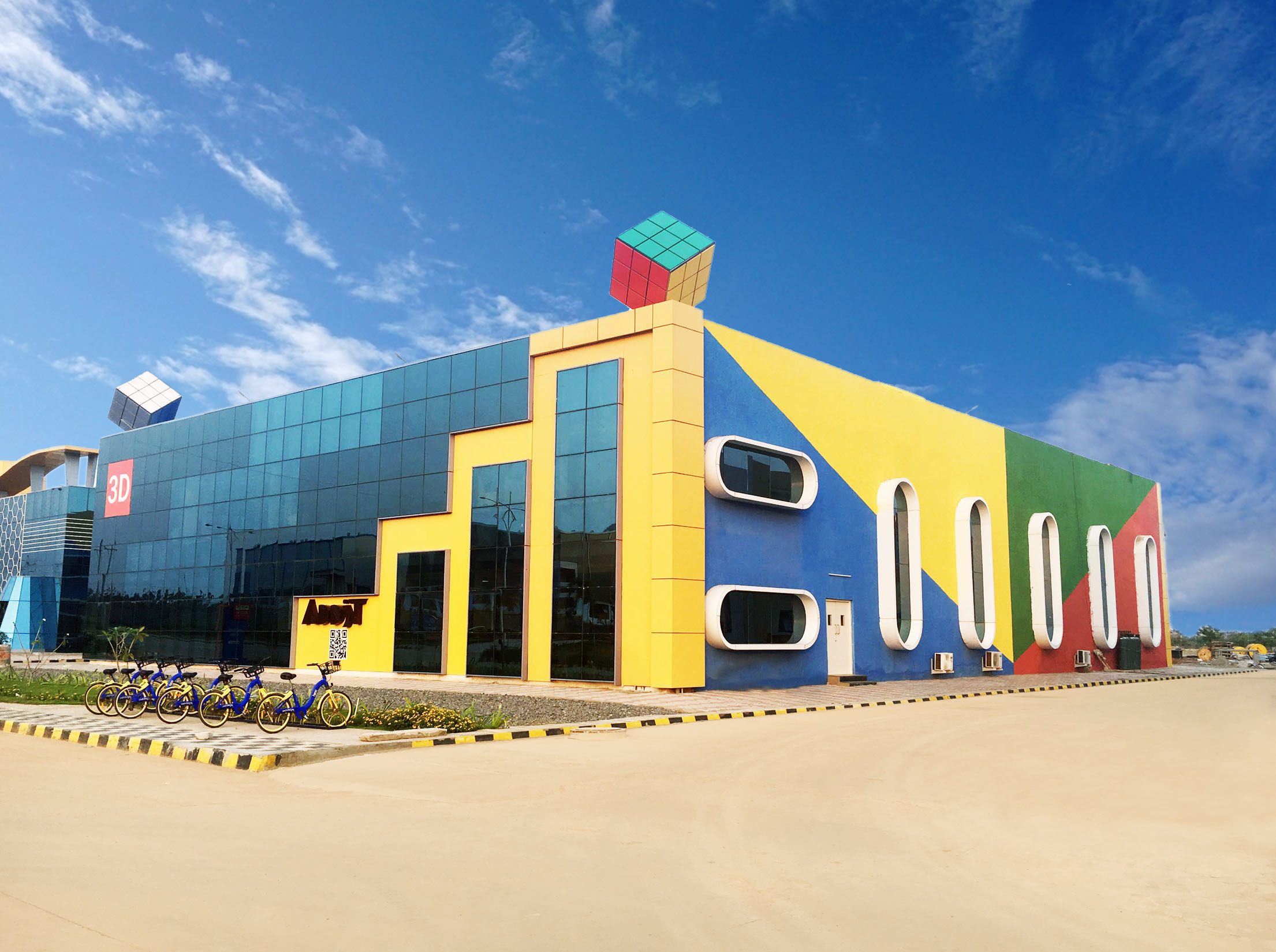
Centre for medtech innovation and rapid prototyping facility

=== ADDIT: Centre for medtech innovation and rapid prototyping facility ===
- Centre for MedTech Innovation and Rapid prototyping facility is operated by M/s T3D labs Private Ltd (Think 3D) and is primarily intended for medical device development and customized implants.
- Number of days for project completion is 184 days.

== Kalam Institute of Health Technology (KIHT) ==
Kalam Institute of Health Technology (KIHT) is a Government of India project supported by the Department of Biotechnology, strategically located at Visakhapatnam within AMTZ. The mandate it serves is aimed at promoting and supporting innovation s in medical technologies through research and development, industry promotion, policy-making and knowledge repository. It comprises 5 cells: 1) Cell for Health Technology Assessment (CHTA) 2) Cell for Technology Transfer (CTT) 3) Cell for Product Realization (CPR) 4) Cell for Market Intelligence and Trade (CMIT) and 5) Cell for Supply Chain Management (CSCM).

In the year 2022, KIHT became the world only WHO Collaborating centre for Health Innovation.

=== Cell for Health Technology Assessment ===
CRD works towards channelizing the national research funding for critical components by identifying medical devices specific for Indian needs based on the disease burden and high import dependency. The Biotechnology Industry Research Assistance Council (BIRAC), a Public- Sector Enterprise of DBT, is also collaborating with KIHT to identify the core areas for focused funding for research initiatives in medical technology.

=== Cell for Technology Transfer ===
The CTT team supports MedTech transfers(e-Auction) and facilitates rapid industrial promotion.

=== Cell for Product Realisation(CPR) ===
The CPR team provides critical component knowledge to relevant institutions for focused research & development and also facilitates core scientific facilities in developing core medical device technologies.

=== Cell for Market Intelligence and Trade ===
The CMIT team acts as knowledge repository for export and import data on medical devices and an advisory board on all matters relating to medical device sector. This cell also tracks foreign direct investments via different routes in the Indian medical device ecosystem and gives strategical recommendations to various incubated start-ups at AMTZ.

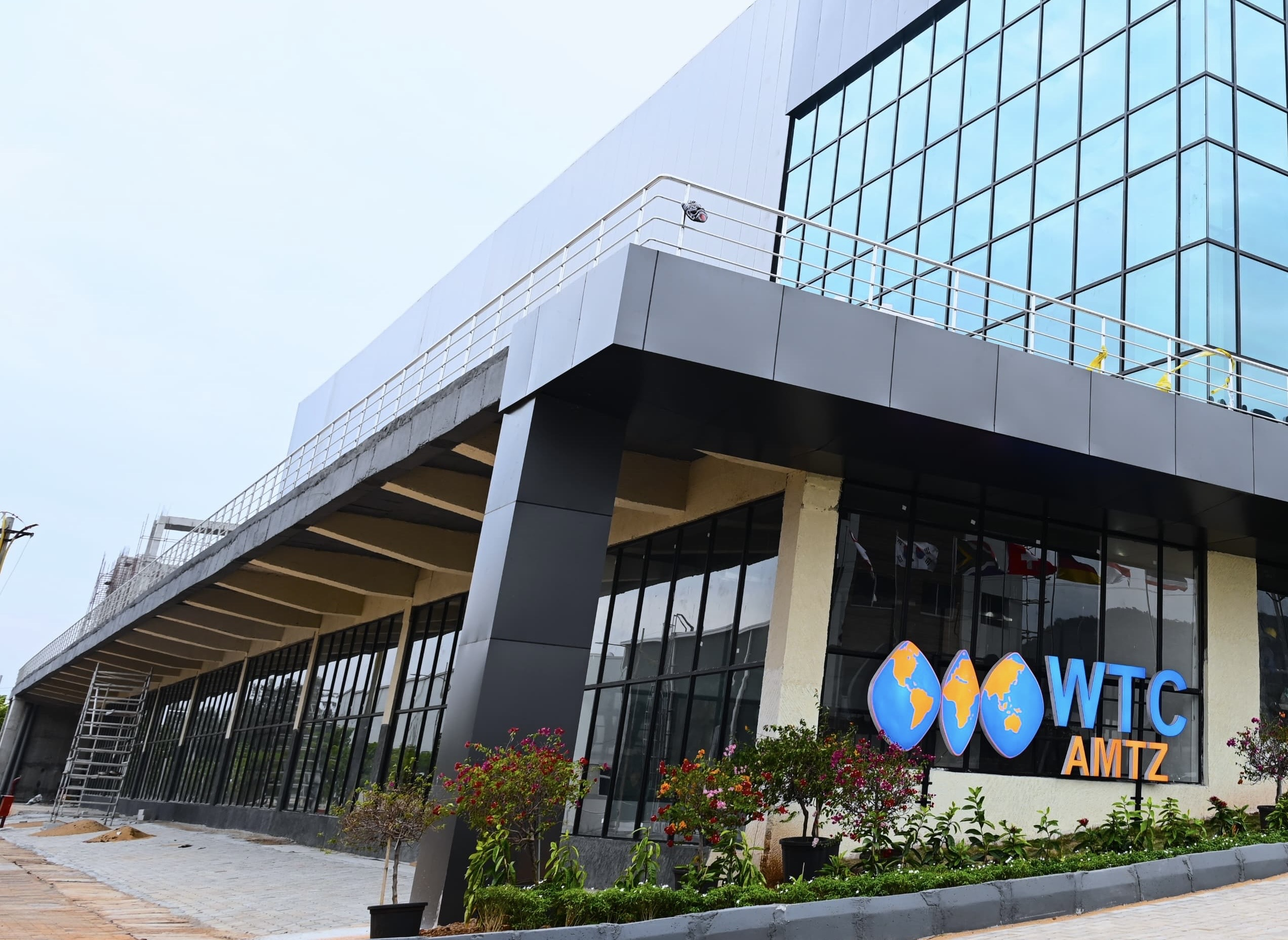
WTC-AMTZ

== World Trade Centre-AMTZ ==
WTC-AMTZ fosters trade and collaboration facilities to its partners and businesses around.

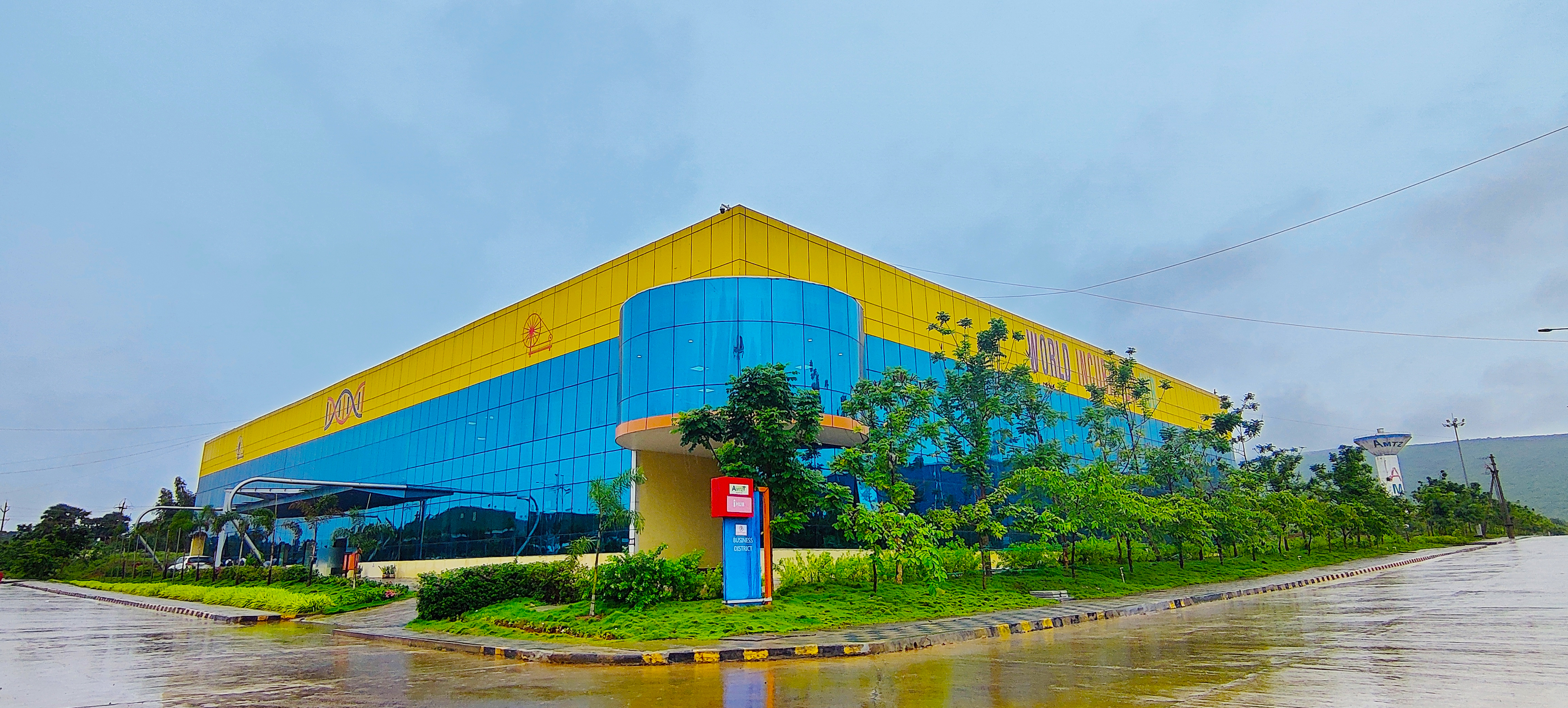
iHUB: House of Medivalley & Biovalley incubation Center

== MediValley ==
Medi Valley is the incubation arm of Andhra Pradesh MedTech Zone (AMTZ).

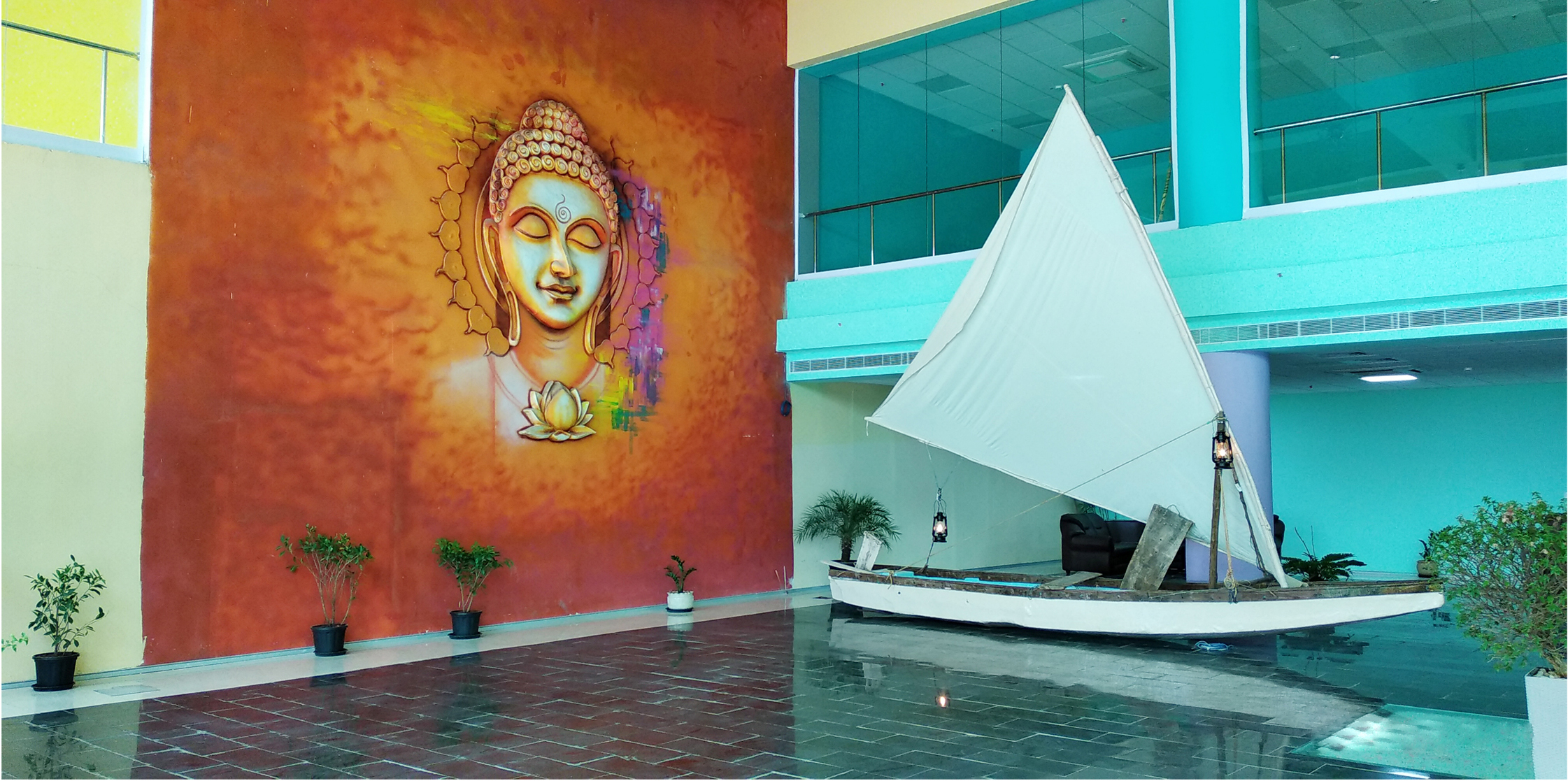
Entrance Lounge of iHUB

== BioValley ==
The Bio-Incubator Nurturing Entrepreneurship for Scaling Technologies (BioNEST) Incubator "Bio Valley Incubation Council (BVIC)", is funded by Department of Biotechnology (DBT) and Andhra Pradesh MedTech Zone (AMTZ).

== Awards and recognition ==
On 14 February 2017, AMTZ was awarded as "Innovative Medtech Zone" by the World Health & Wellness Congress.

On 27 February 2017, AMTZ was included in the list of 25 fastest growing medical technology companies in India in 2017 by The CEO magazine.

== See also ==
- Kalam Institute of Health Technology
