= Krishna Ella =

Indian biotech scientist and entrepreneur

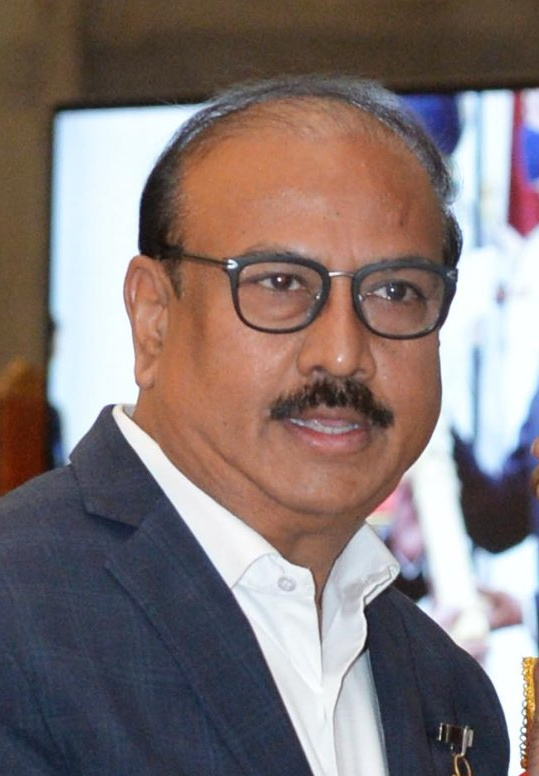
- Ella in 2022
- Born: Krishna Murthy Ella; 1969 (age 56–57); Nemali, Tiruttani, Tamil Nadu, India
- Education: Ph.D (University of Wisconsin–Madison); M.S. (University of Hawaii); M.Sc. (University of Agricultural Sciences, Bangalore)
- Occupations: Scientist, entrepreneur
- Known for: Co-founder of Bharat Biotech
- Notable work: Development of Covaxin, ROTAVAC, Typbar TCV
- Title: Executive Chairman of Bharat Biotech
- Term: 1996–present
- Spouse: Suchitra Ella
- Awards: Padma Bhushan (2022)

Krishna Ella is an Indian scientist and entrepreneur. He is the co-founder and Executive Chairman of Bharat Biotech, a biotechnology company known for developing Covaxin, India's first indigenous COVID-19 vaccine, in collaboration with the Indian Council of Medical Research (ICMR). Bharat Biotech was also involved in the development of ROTAVAC, a vaccine against rotavirus, in collaboration with Department of Biotechnology (DBT), Government of India, and international partners, including the Rotavirus Vaccine Development Program (RVDP) of PATH and the National Institutes of Health (NIH), USA; and Typbar TCV, a typhoid conjugate vaccine. Ella worked as a research faculty member at the Medical University of South Carolina in Charleston after earning his Ph.D. from the University of Wisconsin–Madison. In 2022, Ella and his wife, Suchitra Ella, received the Padma Bhushan, India's third-highest civilian award, for their contributions to trade and industry.

== Early life and education ==
Krishna Ella was born in 1969 in Nemali, a village near Tiruttani in the Tiruvallur district of Tamil Nadu, India, into a Telugu-speaking Hindu family. His father was a farmer. Ella completed his bachelor's degree at Maharogi Seva Samiti's Anand Niketan College Of Agriculture Warora and earned an M.Sc. from the University of Agricultural Sciences, Bangalore. He then pursued an M.S. at the University of Hawaii on a Rotary fellowship, followed by a Ph.D. in plant pathology from the University of Wisconsin–Madison.

== Career ==
After completing his education, Ella briefly worked at the agricultural division of the German company Bayer. He later returned to India and co-founded Bharat Biotech in Hyderabad in 1996 with his wife, Suchitra Ella. The company launched its Hepatitis B vaccine in 1999, supplying millions of doses to over 65 countries. Bharat Biotech also developed a vaccine candidate for the Zika virus. Ella proposed the establishment of a biotech knowledge park to the then Chief Minister of Andhra Pradesh, N. Chandrababu Naidu, which later became Genome Valley.

== Awards ==
- Padma Bhushan from the Government of India in 2022
- University of Wisconsin–Madison — Distinguished Alumni Award (2011)
- University of Wisconsin–Madison — Honorary Doctor of Science degree (2022)
- BioAsia - Genome Valley Excellence Award (2021)
- JRD Tata Awards — Best Entrepreneur of the Year (2012)
- Marico Innovation Award
- University of Southern California — Asia-Pacific Leadership Award
- ET Now — Special Recognition for Healthcare Industry Award
