= National Institute of Pharmaceutical Education and Research, Hyderabad =

Indian research university in Telangana, India

Coordinates: 17.4711615°N 78.4361373°E

- Type: Public
- Dean: Dr. N Shankariah
- Director: Shailendra Saraf (additional charge)
- Location: Hyderabad, Telangana, India
- Website: www.niperhyd.ac.in

The National Institute of Pharmaceutical Education and Research, Hyderabad (NIPER Hyderabad) is an Indian public pharmaceutical research university. It is one of the seven schools under India's Ministry of Chemicals and Fertilizers. The institute offers Masters and Doctoral degrees in pharmaceutical sciences. As an Institute of National Importance, it plays a major role in human resource development for the Indian pharmaceutical industry.

The institute is located at the former R&D Center of IDPL, Bala Nagar and Hyderabad. Counseling for these institutes are held at NIPER, SAS Nagar (Mohali), Punjab.

The institute has also taken initiative to promote the development of medical devices by collaborating with AMTZ vizag.

== Ranking ==
University and college rankings

Pharmacy – India
- NIRF (2023): 1

The institute is ranked 2nd among pharmacy institutes in India by the National Institutional Ranking Framework (NIRF) in 2024.

== Courses ==
NIPER Hyderabad offers courses in:

- Natural Products
- Pharmaceutical Management, M.B.A. (Pharmacy)
- Medicinal Chemistry, M.S. (Pharmacy)
- Pharmacology & Toxicology, M.S. (Pharmacy)
- Pharmaceutical Analysis, M.S. (Pharmacy)
- Pharmaceutics, M.S. (Pharmacy)
- Regulatory Toxicology, M.S.
- Process Tech & Process Chem., M.Tech.
- Medical Devices, M.Tech

32 Ph.D. students were conducting research work in NIPER-Hyderabad.

NIPER-Hyderabad started an MBA Pharmacy in 2012..

== See also ==
- Genome Valley
- NIPER Hyderabad collaborates with AMTZ for conducting Course M.Tech. (Medical Devices)
