= Kalam Institute of Health Technology =

- Motto in English: Vigyanena Jaataani Jeevanti
- Type: Public
- Established: 2017
- Founders: Dr. Jitendra Sharma
- Affiliations: Department of Biotechnology
- Director: Prof. K. VijayRaghavan
- Location: Visakhapatnam, Andhra Pradesh, India; 17.629777°N 83.162910°E
- Website: kiht.in

Kalam Institute of Health Technology or KIHT is a Government of India project supported by the Department of Biotechnology. The institution established in July 2017 is named in honour of A. P. J. Abdul Kalam and is located at Visakhapatnam within the campus of Andhra Pradesh Medtech Zone. The institute was established under the Make in India Government programme.

== Institution ==
Kalam Institute of Health Technology is focused on research and development of medical devices and medical technology exports. The Institute is supported by the Ministry of Science and Technology.

== Programme and research ==
The institute will provide research and development of medical devices information for Andhra Pradesh Medtech Zone Limited and ties up with research for The Joanna Briggs Institute and University of Adelaide.

== See also ==
- Andhra Pradesh Medtech Zone Limited
