= Bharat Biotech =

Indian multinational biotechnology company and vaccine manufacturer

Coordinates: 17.6652°N 78.6047°E

Bharat Biotech International Limited
- Lead Innovation
- Company type: Private
- Industry: Biotechnology
- Founded: 1996; 30 years ago
- Founder: Dr.Krishna Ella
- Headquarters: Genome Valley, Turakapally, Hyderabad, India
- Area served: Worldwide
- Key people: Dr.Krishna Ella (chairman & MD)
- Products: ROTAVAC, TypbarTCV, Biopolio; Comvac; JENVAC; COVAXIN
- Revenue: ▲₹8,148 crore (US$850 million) (FY22)
- Net income: ▲₹2,895 crore (US$300 million) (FY22)
- Subsidiaries: Chiron Behring Vaccines
- Website: www.bharatbiotech.com

Bharat Biotech International Limited (BBIL) is an Indian multinational biotechnology company based in Hyderabad, which is engaged in drug discovery, drug development, and the manufacture of vaccines, biotherapeutics, pharmaceuticals and healthcare products.

== Overview ==
Bharat Biotech has its manufacturing facility situated at Genome Valley, Hyderabad, India. As of July 2020, the company has over 700 employees and has a presence worldwide.

The company has been responsible for developing an eco-friendly recombinant and a naturally attenuated strain derived Rotavirus vaccine called ROTAVAC. They were one of the first to develop vaccines for viral diseases like Chikungunya and Zika. The company also produces vaccines for Japanese Encephalitis, influenza H1N1, Rabies. Bharat Biotech has biosafety level 3 (BSL3) laboratories.

It has developed the world's first tetanus-toxoid conjugated vaccine for Typhoid.

Bharat Biotech has delivered over nine billion doses of vaccines globally as of May 2025, has over 145 global patents and a portfolio of over 19 vaccines, four biotherapeutics and registrations in over 125 countries.

== COVID-19 vaccine development ==
In April 2020, the company announced that they have partnered with US-based company FluGen and University of Wisconsin-Madison to develop a COVID-19 vaccine.

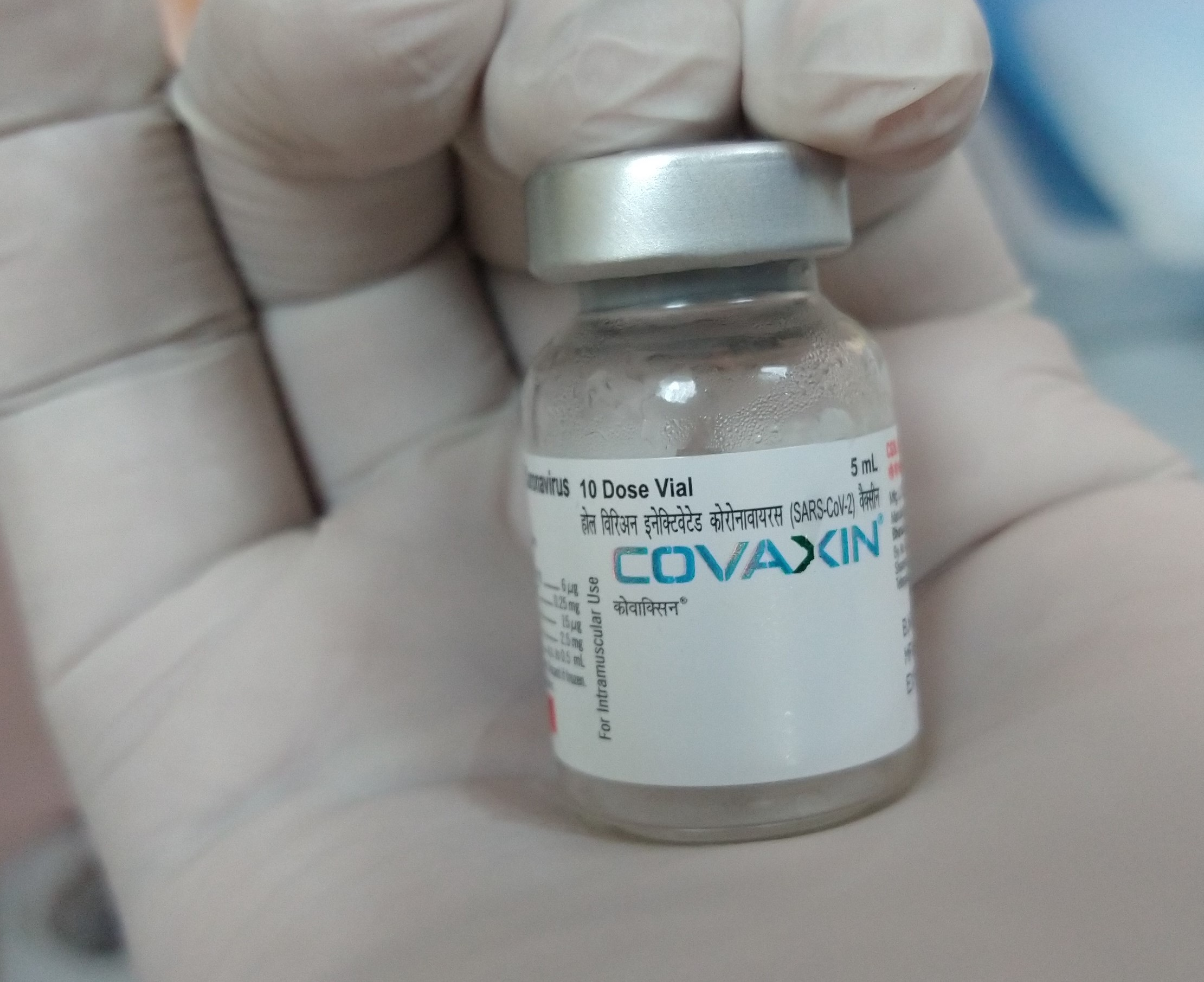
A 5ml vial of Covaxin

In May 2020, Indian Council of Medical Research's (ICMR's) National Institute of Virology approved and provided the virus strains for developing a fully indigenous COVID-19 vaccine. On June 29, 2020, the company got permission to conduct Phase 1 and Phase 2 clinical trials in India for a developmental COVID-19 vaccine named Covaxin, from the Drugs Controller General of India (DCGI), Government of India. The Central Drugs Laboratory (CDL) at Kasauli in Himachal Pradesh has been engaged in testing experimental batches of Bharat Biotech's COVID-19 vaccine Covaxin on a priority basis. A total of 12 sites were selected by the Indian Council for Medical Research for Phase I and II randomised, double-blind and placebo-controlled clinical trials of vaccine candidate.

In September 2020, the company announced that it was going to manufacture the novel chimp-adenovirus, a single dose intranasal vaccine (codenamed BBV154) for COVID-19 being developed in collaboration with the American company Precision virologics and Washington University School of Medicine in St. Louis, Missouri. It is currently undergoing clinical trials. On October 12, 2021, Bharat Biotech's Covaxin got approved for usage on children between 2 and 18 years of age.

=== Attempted data theft ===
In March 2021, Reuters reported that Chinese state-backed cyber-espionage group Red Apollo targeted Bharat Biotech's intellectual property for exfiltration.

== Vaccine Trials ==
On May 21, 2025, Bharat Biotech successfully completed Phase III clinical trials of its oral cholera vaccine, Hillchol, demonstrating efficacy against both Ogawa and Inaba serotypes. The findings of the study have been published in the ScienceDirect vaccine journal.

== See also ==
- Serum Institute of India
- Cadila Healthcare
- Biotechnology in India
