= Turakapally =

Turkapally
- Village
- Interactive map of Turkapally
- Coordinates: 17°39′56.208″N 78°36′14.677″E
- Country: India
- State: Telangana
- District: Medchal–Malkajgiri

Languages
  - Official: Telugu
- Time zone: UTC+5:30 (IST)
- Postal code: 500101
- Telephone code: 040
- Vehicle registration: TS 07 X XXXX
- Sex ratio: 1:1(approx) ♂/♀
- Website: telangana.gov.in

Turkapally is a village in the suburb of Shamirpet Mandal of Medchal-Malkajgiri district in Telangana, India. The area is the headquarters for Genome Valley - Bharat Biotech Park, IKP Knowledge Park, and Alexandria Knowledge Park.
