= Nadupuru =

- Neighbourhood
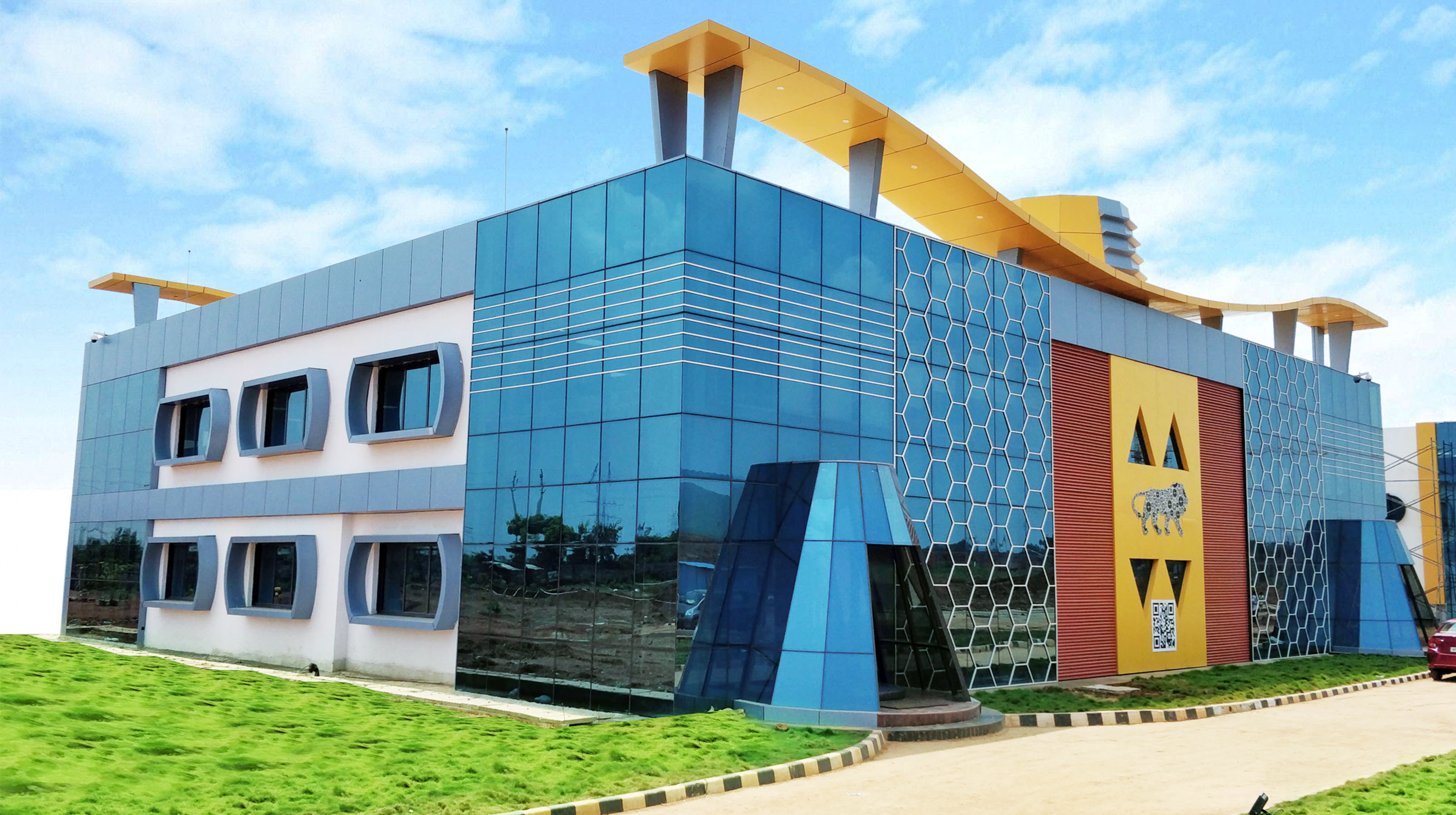
- AMTZ Building

- Location in Visakhapatnam
- Coordinates: 17.670779°N 83.195647°E
- Country: India
- State: Andhra Pradesh
- District: Visakhapatnam

Government
  - Body: Greater Visakhapatnam Municipal Corporation

Languages
  - Official: Telugu
- Time zone: UTC+5:30 (IST)
- PIN: 530044
- Vehicle registration: AP-31

Nadupuru is a residential area of the city of Visakhapatnam state of Andhra Pradesh, India.

== Transport ==
APSRTC routes

Route number	Start	End	Via
38D	Nadupuru Dairy Colony	RTC Complex	Pedagantyada, New Gajuwaka, Old Gajuwaka, BHPV, Airport, NAD Junction, Birla Junction, Gurudwar
