= Jeedimetla =

- Suburb
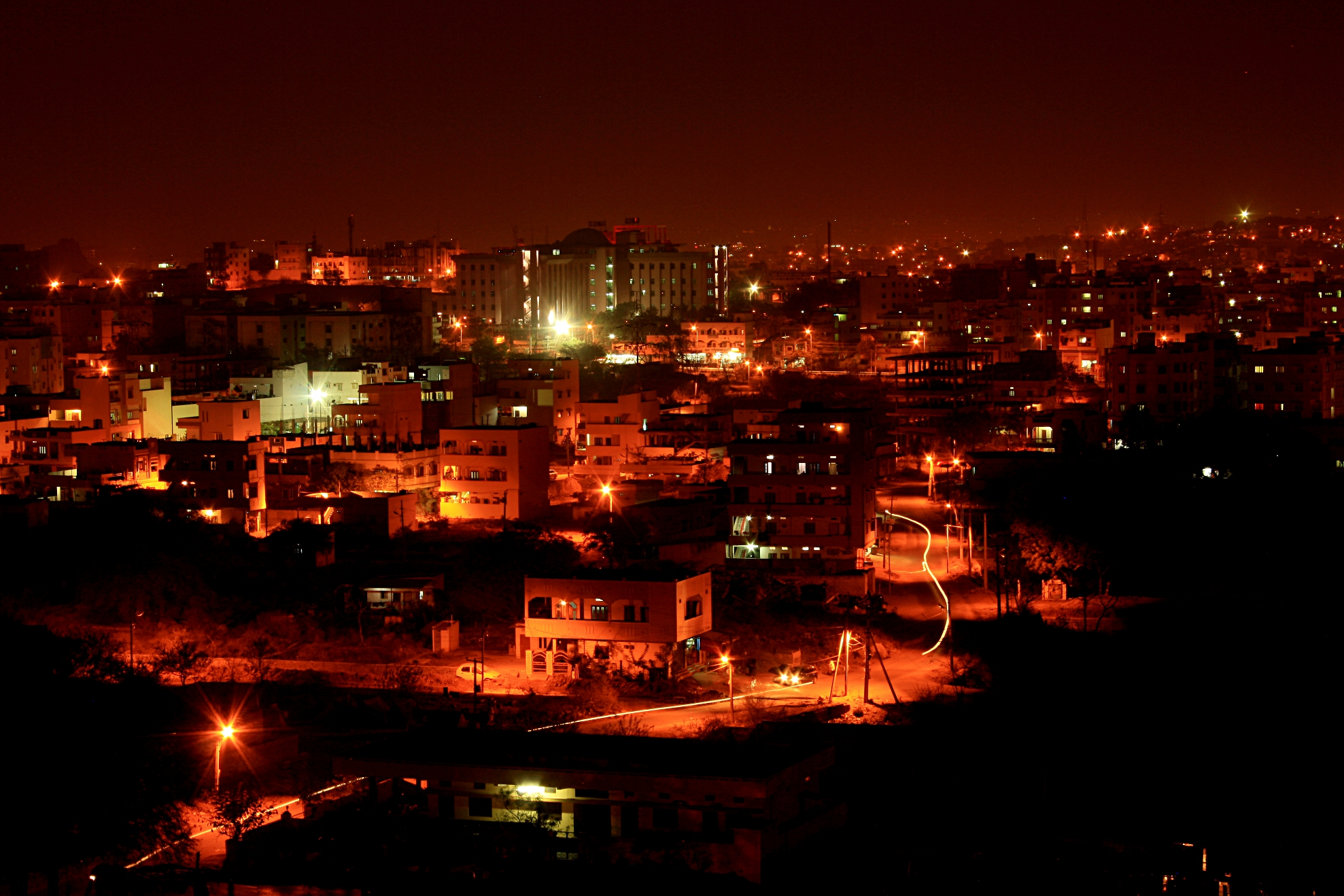
- Gajularamaram skyline UMCC

- Location in Hyderabad, India Jeedimetla (India)
- Coordinates: 17.499313°N 78.458261°E
- Country: India
- State: Telangana
- District: Medchal
- City: Hyderabad

Government
  - Type: GHMC
  - Body: HMDA

Languages
  - Official: Telugu
- Time zone: UTC+5:30 (IST)
- Postal code: 500055
- Vehicle registration: TS-08
- Website: telangana.gov.in

Jeedimetla is a suburb of Hyderabad in the Indian state of Telangana.

Jeedimetla Industrial Area, as the name suggests, is popular for its industries. The downtown features a number of small and large industrial units including some of the India card-carrying ones.

The industrial area is divided into small localities featuring different manufacturing blocks. HMT Colony is one good example that illustrates the characteristics of the place. Important industries located in the region are those of machine tools, pharmaceuticals, electrics, textiles and chemicals.

Most of the residents are employed in various industries that are replete here. To cater to the population are present local markets, health care institutes, schools and other institutions. Some residential places within the premises include Padmanagar, Chintal and Ayodhya Nagar.

== Accessibility ==
Jeedimetla is the northernmost region of Secunderabad. It is about 12km from the city center.

Medak provides the access to the region. There are no train services. The Rajiv Gandhi International Airport is about 45km from Jeedimetla. The Air Force Academy, Dundigul is about 9km away. One of the largest cardiac hospitals, Usha Mullapudi Cardiac Centre (UMCC), is in Jeedimetla. A TSRTC Bus Depot is also situated in Jeedimetla.

== Businesses ==
Hetero Drugs Limited has two formulation and two API manufacturing facilities located in Jeedimetla. Dr reddy's laboratory is also situated here. Dr. copper copper water bottles manufacturing unit is also situated here. Hyderabad coach bus manufacturing unit is located in this area. Hatsun Agro Product Ltd - milk dairy is also located here. And many more steel plants are there.
