= Kamino =

Kamino may refer to:

- Kamino, personal name of Emperor Saga (785–842), emperor of Japan
- Kamino bodies, eosinophilic globoids
- Kamino (rural locality), a village in Zharkovsky District of Tver Oblast, Russia
- Kamino (Star Wars), a fictional planet in the Star Wars franchise

== People with the surname ==
- Yuka Kamino (神野 由佳, born 1980), Japanese speed skater
- Brenda Kamino, a Canadian actress

== See also ==
- Camino (disambiguation)
- Comino (disambiguation)
- Kamina (disambiguation)
- Kamini (disambiguation)
