= Kaloji Narayana Rao University of Health Sciences =

Public university in Telangana, India

Coordinates: 18°0′8.08″N 79°35′23.63″E

- Type: Public
- Established: September 26, 2014; 12 years ago
- Chancellor: Governor of Telangana
- Vice-Chancellor: Dr. K. Ramesh Reddy (acting)
- Location: Warangal, Telangana, India
- Campus: Urban
- Website: www.knruhs.telangana.gov.in

The Kaloji Narayana Rao University of Health Sciences (KNRUHS) is a public university in the city of Warangal, Telangana, India. University is named after the poet and a political activist of the Telangana movement – Kaloji Narayana Rao.

== History ==
Before the bifurcation of Andhra Pradesh, all the medical colleges were affiliated to Dr. NTR University of Health Sciences. Post the enactment of the Andhra Pradesh Re-organisation act of 2014, Government of Telangana established a new university "Kaloji Narayana Rao University of Health Sciences". Prime Minister of India, Narendra Modi formally laid foundation to the university on 7 August 2016. The re-affiliation of Telangana medical colleges with KNRUHS started from June 2016.

== Admission and Courses ==
The admission for the convener quota is based on an applicant's NEET (National Eligibility Entrance Test) rank for admission into MBBS and BDS Courses and EAPCET rank for other allied paramedics and pharma courses.

== Affiliated Colleges ==
=== Government Colleges ===
There are 1250 seats in Government Colleges. Notable colleges include:

- Nizam's Institute of Medical Sciences, Hyderabad
- Osmania Medical College, Hyderabad
- Gandhi Medical College, Hyderabad
- Kakatiya Medical College, Warangal
- Government Medical College, Karimnagar
- Rajiv Gandhi Institute of Medical Sciences, Adilabad
- Government Medical College, Nizamabad
- Government Medical College, Mahbubnagar
- Government Medical College, Siddipet
- Government Medical College, Suryapet
- Government Medical College, Ramagundam
- Government Medical College, Mancherial
- Government Medical College, Quthbullapur
- ESIC Medical College, Hyderabad
- Government Medical College, Narsampet

=== Private Colleges ===
There are 2250 seats in Private Colleges. Notable colleges include:

- Durgabai Deshmukh College of Physiotherapy, Hyderabad
- Deccan College of Medical Sciences, Hyderabad
- Shadan Institute of Medical Sciences, Hyderabad
- Kamineni Institute of Medical Sciences, Narketpally
- Maheshwara Medical College and Hospital, Patancheru
- Malla Reddy Institute of Medical Sciences, Hyderabad
- SVS Medical College, Mahabubnagar
- Nova Institute Of Medical Sciences and Research Centre,Hyderabad.
- Prathima Institute of Medical Sciences, Karimnagar
- Chalmeda Anand Rao Institute of Medical Sciences, Karimnagar
- Ayaan Institute of Medical Sciences
