= Ayaan Institute of Medical Sciences =

Ayaan Institute of Medical Sciences, Teaching Hospital and Research Centre
- Type: Private
- Established: 2018
- Founders: Dr. Mohammed Vizarat Rasool Khan
- Affiliation: Kaloji Narayana Rao University of Health Sciences
- Undergraduates: 150
- Address: Kanaka Mamidi, Moinabad, Hyderabad, Telangana, 501504, India
- Campus: Suburban, 25 acres (10 ha)
- Website: http://aimshyd.in/

Ayaan Institute of Medical Sciences (AIMS) is a private medical college located in Kanaka Mamidi, Moinabad, Ranga Reddy District, Telangana, India. It was established in 2018 by Dr. Mohammed Vizarat Rasool Khan, and is administered by Ayaan Educational Society. The institute is recognized by the National Medical Commission (NMC) and is affiliated with Kaloji Narayana Rao University of Health Sciences (KNRUHS) in Warangal.

== Courses ==
Ayaan Institute of Medical Sciences offers undergraduate courses, primarily the Bachelor of Medicine and Bachelor of Surgery (MBBS), with an annual intake of 150 students.

== Hospital ==
The hospital associated with AIMS is a multi-specialty hospital with 300 beds, which can be expanded to 700 beds in the span of another 3 years. The hospital is located in the same campus as the college.

== COVID19 pandemic effort ==
In response to the COVID-19 pandemic, the Telangana state government enlisted the support of 21 medical college hospitals, including AIMS, permitted to treat the patients in the state.

== See also ==
- Deccan College of Medical Sciences (DCMS)
- Shadan Institute of Medical Sciences (SIMS)
