= El Camino =

El Camino (Spanish for "the road", "the way", "the path") may refer to:

== Places ==
- El Camino, California, a community in Tehama County
- El Camino College, a community college in Los Angeles County, California
- El Camino Hospital, a hospital in Mountain View, California

== Film ==
- El Camino (1964 film), a Spanish film directed by Ana Mariscal
- El Camino: A Breaking Bad Movie, a 2019 film sequel to the TV series Breaking Bad
- El camino (2008 film), a 2008 American film starring Elisabeth Moss

== Music ==
- El Camino (Adriana Evans album), 2007
- El Camino (Álvaro Soler album), 2025
- El Camino (The Black Keys album), 2011
- El Camino (Vox Dei album), 2005
- "El Camino", a song from Ween's album GodWeenSatan: The Oneness (1990)

== Other uses ==
- The Camino de Santiago, a popular network of pilgrimage routes through Spain
- Chevrolet El Camino, a coupé utility vehicle produced by General Motors from 1959 to 1960 and 1964 to 1987
- El Camino (train), a train owned by Los Angeles County
- El camino, a 1950 novel by Miguel Delibes; basis for the 1964 film

== See also ==
- El (disambiguation)
- Camino (disambiguation)
- El Camino Real (disambiguation), various roads in California, Mexico, Spain, and elsewhere
