= Vox Dei (band) =

Argentine rock band

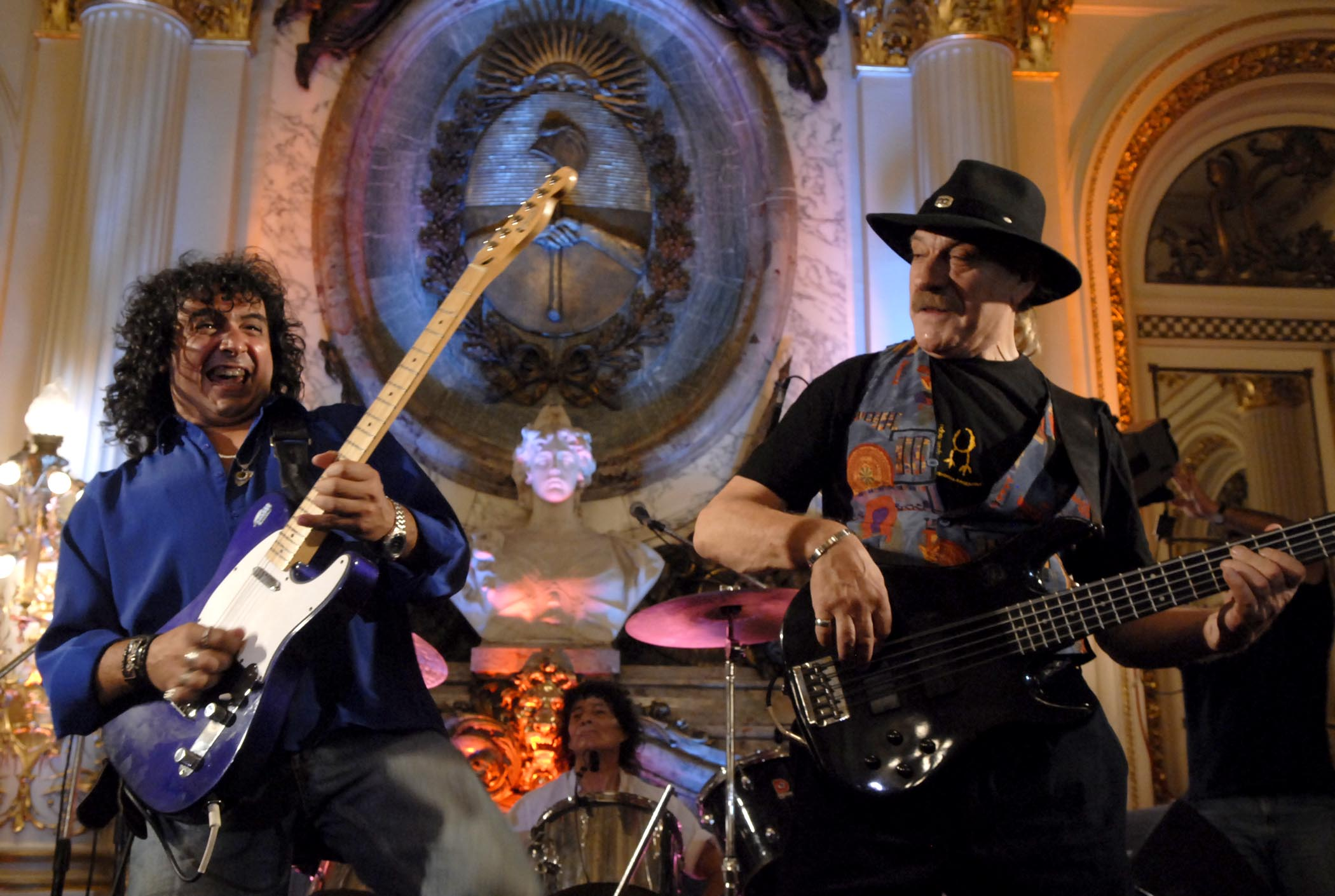
- L–R: Carlos Gardellini, Rubén Basoalto and Willy Quiroga performing live in 2007 at the presidential palace..

Background information
- Origin: Quilmes, Argentina
- Genres: Argentine rock Hard rock Progressive rock Psychedelic rock Blues rock
- Years active: 1967–1981; 1986– 2024
- Labels: Mandioca, Disc Jockey, CBS, Polydor, B.B. Records, DBN, La Rompe, Fonocal
- Members: Carlos Gardellini; Simon Quiroga
- Past members: Willy Quiroga †; Ricardo Soulé †; Rubén Basoalto †; Juan Carlos Godoy; Nacho Smilari; Beto Fortunato †; Carlos Michelini; Enrique "Avellaneda" Díaz; Raúl Fernández; Daniel Laira; Jorge León
- Website: www.voxdei.com.ar

Vox Dei (Latin: Voice of God) was an Argentine rock band credited with recording the country's first concept album, La Biblia. Their most prolific years were the 1970s, when they recorded ten albums.

Vox Dei have had several line-up changes and a five-year hiatus. Their third and most commercially successful line-up featured Ricardo Soulé (guitar and vocals), Willy Quiroga (bass and vocals) and Rubén Basoalto (drums). This line-up was active from 1972 to 1974 (then in 1978 to the 1981 break-up), and was revived from 1986 to 1989, and again from 1996 to 1998. The band's line-up (which featured Willy Quiroga, and guitarist Carlos Gardellini from 1992) has been much more stable in recent years, although drummer Rubén Basoalto's death in 2010 (being succeeded by Simon Quiroga) left Willy Quiroga as the only original member still in the band. Quiroga died on 21 November 2024, at the age of 84.

== History ==
=== Formation and early years (1967–1970) ===
The band's original members were Juan Carlos Godoy (guitar and vocals), Ricardo Soulé (guitar and vocals), Rubén Basoalto (drums) and Willy Quiroga (bass and vocals).

Vox Dei started playing songs from bands like The Rolling Stones, The Beatles, The Kinks and The Byrds. In 1968, they recorded a demo version of Percy Sledge's "When a Man Loves a Woman", and Spencer Davis Group's "Gimme Some Lovin'". The company Mandioca organized an audition for them in the Payró theatre. The members of Manal and Almendra were also present, and a few hours later they played together. After this show, Luis Alberto Spinetta (Almendra's leader) asked them to sing in Spanish, to which they finally agreed. Shortly, Quiroga and Soulé began to discuss their desire to take the band in a new direction.

In 1970, Jorge Álvarez (Mandioca label owner) produced their recording sessions in TNT Studios, managed by Tim Croatto. Their first studio album of this period, released in mid-1970, was Caliente.

In the B.A. Rock Festival Vox Dei played the first part of the theme "Genesis", which had no lyrics yet, advancing his next LP. During the recording, Ricardo Soulé and Yodi Godoy had musical differences and Godoy felt considerable fatigue and left the group in late 1970, before the final sessions. At the time, Mandioca label went bankrupt, and Vox Dei initially were hired for Disc-Jockey Records, and got the deal to release their second LP.

=== The glory days (1971–1974) ===
In February 1971, released La Biblia ("The Bible"). Being the first Argentine concept album, it became a turning point in the history of Argentine rock; even the Archdiocese, that had asked to examine the lyrics, recommended young people to buy it. Right after the recording of La Biblia, Yodi Godoy was replaced by Nacho Smilari (former La Barra de Chocolate), and the new Vox Dei line-up began a successful national tour to attract more attention from a new audience.

After the tour, in late 1971, Disc-Jockey released "Donde has estado todo este tiempo" as a promotional single, with the Nacho Smilari only contribution, who left the band due to health problems during the same sessions, which continued with the three remaining musicians, thus giving the first LP made as "power-trio": Jeremías Pies de Plomo published in the first half of 1972. In December, was released Cuero Caliente, with eight new versions songs from Caliente, and the main single "El Momento en Que Estás (Presente)" was released with great air-playing. One alive version played at B.A. Rock '72, was included on the 1973 film Hasta que se ponga el Sol.

Meanwhile, Vox Dei undertook during the next tours in 1973 to begin work on a live album, La Nave Infernal, the last LP published by the DJ label. A few months later, the group signed with CBS Records, with their first release on the label being Es una Nube, No Hay Duda. In 1974, during the next album sessions, Ricardo Soulé was invited by the Heavy Metal Kids keyboardist Danny Peyronel, go to London to see his performance as Alice Cooper's support act at Wembley Stadium. With Vox Dei para Vox Dei released that same year, Soulé announced he would leave the band to start as a solo artist at the end of year after his holidays.

=== Transitional years (1975–1977) ===
In early 1975, guitarists Carlos Michelini and Beto Fortunato were hired for the band and continued to work on new material. This line-up recorded one song: "Nada es tan dificil como estar vivo", included on Rock Competition a various artists LP (shared with acts like Trio Lluvia, Invisible and Vivencia) but only Carlos Michelini remained with Vox Dei and released Estamos en la Pecera published that same year. The band took a more experimental direction and the record was not very well-received, though it gained more appreciation from fans as time has passed since its initial release. In 1976, due to the political situation in Argentina (National Reorganization Process), Michelini left the band and traveled to Spain, to be replaced by two guitarists again: Raúl Fernández and Enrique "Avellaneda" Díaz. With this four-piece line-up Vox Dei recorded Ciegos de Siglos, released that same year, followed by an extensive Argentine tour.

=== Revival and break-up (1978–1981) ===
After the Ciegos de Siglos Tour, in late 1977, Fernández and Díaz left the band due to CBS's decision to finish contractual bonds with the group. In early 1978, Ricardo Soulé returned to the band, and with his bandmates, appeared at the Teatro Estrellas (Buenos Aires) with several shows where they received positive reviews from the press. In October, Vox Dei signed to Polydor Records and started work on their new album Gata de Noche, which was released in December 1978 and proved to be a successful album for the group. Slowly the differences between the musicians started to grow during the making of a conceptual new album about El Cid, but Polydor refused to produce it. During 1980, Vox Dei decided to embark on a local tour titled 10 años de la Biblia performing his classic masterpiece La Biblia. Finally, tensions began to appear between Ricardo Soulé and Willy Quiroga, and on 25 April 1981, Vox Dei performed a farewell show at the Estadio Obras Sanitarias.

After the split, Ricardo Soulé returned to his solo career, releasing in 1982 Romances de Gesta, with some material that was not used on the failed El Cid LP; while Willy Quiroga formed a new band: Destroyer, with Palo Penayo on guitar and vocals, Beto Topini (later JAF and La Torre drummer) and Luis Valenti on keyboards. The band toured regularly through 1982, and recorded a self-titled album that same year. Rubén Basoalto formed another band with Vox Dei former members Enrique "Avellaneda" Díaz and Raúl Fernández called Rompeaces, then Basoalto played along with Willy Quiroga in the same band.

=== First Reunion (1986–1989) ===
In 1986 Vox Dei made a reunion show with their classic line-up. Willy Quiroga, Ricardo Soulé and Rubén Basoalto decided to present La Biblia at the Teatro Opera of Buenos Aires with keyboardists Luis Valenti and Juan "Pollo" Raffo as guests, with three sold-out shows, followed with a summer tour, along with some TV performances. In 1988, Vox Dei released Tengo Razones para Seguir, after having been contracted by the small Magnatape Musical label (in fact, a cassettes manufacturer). During an otherwise successful local tour, Ricardo Soulé walked out in 1989, due to the Argentina economic crisis, which was also suffered by several local artists and rock bands.

=== Reformations and second reunion (1990–1998) ===
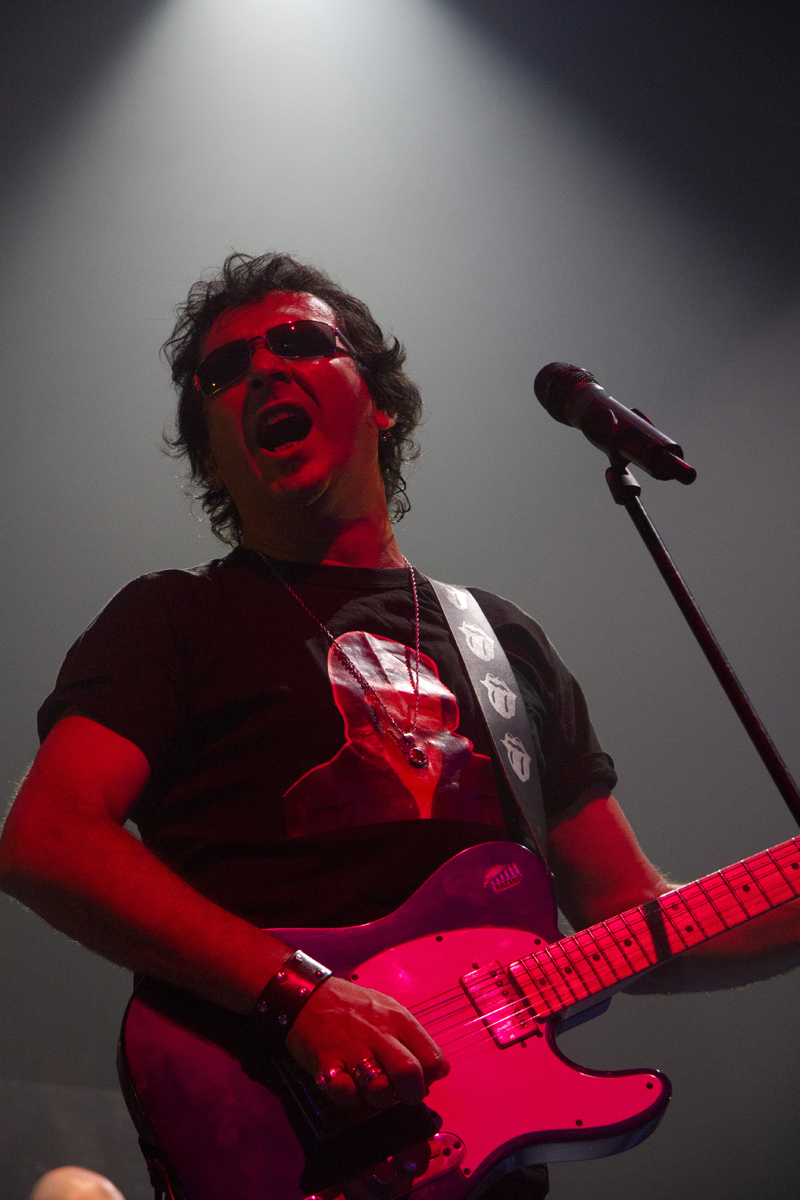
Carlos Gardellini, playing in 2012.

Towards the end of 1989, after a few Willy Quiroga and Rubén Basoalto solo shows in Córdoba, Vox Dei hired two new members: Jorge León (rhythm guitar and vocals) and Daniel Laira (lead guitar), performing at the popular Badía & Co. TV show. By 1992, Jorge León left the band, replaced by Carlos Gardellini (a friend of drummer Rubén Basoalto). Laira quits in 1993, leaving Gardellini as the only guitarist, releasing in 1994 a new studio album, Sin Darle Ya Más Vueltas. This line-up began the respective promotional tour, including an acoustic show for the local branch of MuchMusic.

Between 1996 and 1998, Ricardo Soulé returned to the band, performing a reunion show at the Teatro Opera, releasing the live album El Regreso de la Leyenda. Then, recorded with Ricardo Soulé a remake of La Biblia in 1997, with guests like Andres Calamaro, Fito Páez and Alejandro Lerner.

=== Gardellini return and El Camino (1999–2009) ===
In 1998, Carlos Gardellini returned with Willy Quiroga and Rubén Basoalto. Then, Vox Dei independently produced a new studio album El Camino issued in 2005 by Vox Dei's own label: La Rompe Records. In 2007 they released the double live album Vox Dei en Vivo, for the 40th anniversary of the band. They also played live at Teatro Coliseo as part of the 40th anniversary tour, portions of the show were telecast through Crónica TV in Argentina and other countries, exposing the band to a wider audience. During some shows, Vox Dei played the song "El Viejo", as a tribute to Pappo, sung by Gardellini.

=== Rubén Basoalto death and recent events (2010–present) ===
On 3 November 2010, drummer Rubén Basoalto died of lung cancer. The multi-instrumentalist Simón Quiroga (Willy Quiroga's son) replaced Rubén Basoalto and the band continued to perform shows. Vox Dei also performed at the 2010 Metal para Todos Festival, along with Almafuerte, Dulces 16 and El Reloj on 25 December. By 2011, with La Biblia 40th anniversary, Vox Dei performed at the Centro Cultural General San Martin featuring the band The End. In June 2012, performed the Jeremías Pies de Plomo 40th anniversary gig at the Teatro SHA, also with The End as guest.

On 2 December 2016, Vox Dei played together with Javier Martinez's Manal at Teatro Gran Rex of Buenos Aires, as part of 50 años de Rock Nacional (Argentine Rock 50th anniversary).

=== Reunion with Soulé and "Yodi" Godoy (2013–2014) ===
On 15 October 2013, the band performed a reunion show with the original members Ricardo Soulé and Juan Carlos Godoy at the Luna Park stadium. This particular line-up consisted of ex-band members together with Iván and Vicky Soulé (both Ricardo Soulé's children), Simón Quiroga as drummer and Javier Basoalto (Rubén Basoalto's son) as part of the band. Guitarist Carlos Gardellini was not part of the show.

=== 50th anniversary and lawsuit (2017–present) ===
By early 2017, Willy Quiroga announced a new local tour for the band's 50th anniversary. In June, Ricardo Soulé sued Quiroga due to unauthorized band name use during this year, to which he had the rights since 2005. Willy Quiroga continued to play live with the same line-up, but as "Willy Quiroga Vox Dei".

== Members ==
Current members

- Carlos Gardellini – lead guitar and backing vocals (1992–1996, 1999–present)
- Simón Quiroga – drums and percussion (2010–present)

Former members

- Willy Quiroga – bass guitar, guitar, keyboards and vocals (1967–1981, 1986–20??; died 2024)
- Rubén Basoalto – drums, percussion and vocals (1967–1981, 1986–2010; his death)
- Ricardo Soulé – guitar, piano, harmonica, violin and vocals (1967–1974, 1978–1981, 1986–1989, 1996–1998, 2013–2014)
- Juan Carlos "Yodi" Godoy – rhythm guitar and vocals (1967–1971), (2013–2014)
- Carlos Michelini – guitar and vocals (1974–1975)
- Nacho Smilari – rhythm guitar (1971)
- Beto Fortunato – guitar (1974)
- Enrique "Avellaneda" Díaz – rhythm guitar and vocals (1976–1978)
- Raúl Fernández – lead guitar (1976–1978)
- Daniel Laira – lead guitar (1989–1993)
- Jorge León – rhythm guitar and vocals (1989–1992)

Guests

- Chiche Graciano – keyboards (1988–1989, 1994)
- Juan "Pollo" Raffo – keyboards and backing vocals (1986, 1996–1998)

== Discography ==
Studio Albums

- 1970 - Caliente
- 1971 - La Biblia
- 1972 - Jeremías Pies de Plomo
- 1972 - Cuero Caliente
- 1973 - Es una Nube, No Hay Duda
- 1974 - Vox Dei para Vox Dei
- 1975 - Estamos en la Pecera
- 1976 - Ciegos de Siglos
- 1978 - Gata de Noche
- 1988 - Tengo Razones para Seguir
- 1994 - Sin Darle Ya Más Vueltas
- 1997 - La Biblia (Re-recording)
- 2005 - El Camino

Live Albums

- 1973 - La Nave Infernal
- 1987 - La Biblia Según Vox Dei en Vivo 1986
- 1996 - El Regreso de la Leyenda
- 2007 - Vox Dei en Vivo
- 2013 - La Biblia 40º Aniversario
- 2015 - Reencuentro en el Luna Park 2013
- 2017 - Gran Rex II | XII | MMXVI (as Willy Quiroga Vox Dei)
- 2018 - Esta Noche No Parece Igual (as Willy Quiroga Vox Dei)
