= Tengo Razones para Seguir =

Studio album by Vox Dei
- Released: 1988
- Recorded: August–September 1988; Panda Studios, Buenos Aires
- Genre: Hard rock
- Length: 38:25
- Label: Magnatape Musical
- Producers: Isak Portugheis; Marcelo Figoli; Juan Carlos Porro

Vox Dei chronology
La Biblia Según Vox Dei en Vivo 1986 (1987)	Tengo Razones para Seguir (1988)	Sin Darle Ya Más Vueltas (1994)

Tengo Razones para Seguir (I have reasons to keep on going) is the eleventh studio album by Argentine rock band Vox Dei. It represents the second album recorded after the return in 1986, to commemorate the 20th anniversary of Vox Dei.

It was the first Vox Dei studio album in ten years, and the first with the third line-up (Soulé, Quiroga, Basoalto), since Gata de Noche in 1978. Contains several unreleased tracks with a sound influenced by the 1980s music.

After the presentations, Ricardo Soulé left the band once again in 1989 and moved to Spain, partly due to economic situation in Argentina.

== Songs ==
- All songs written by Ricardo Soulé, except where noted.

No.	Title	Writer(s)	Length
1.	"El dia de la victoria"		4:07
2.	"No me vengas con historias"	Willy Quiroga	3:16
3.	"Espectros I"		4:11
4.	"Espectros II"		2:35
5.	"A nada le temo mas"		2:54
6.	"Tiempo de conversar"	Willy Quiroga	2:51
7.	"Tengo razones para seguir"	Willy Quiroga	4:09
8.	"Un corazón dispuesto"	Willy Quiroga	3:53
9.	"En el siglo XXI"		3:51
10.	"Harley Davidson"		3:00
11.	"Dios es una mujer desnuda"	Ricardo Soulé, Willy Quiroga	3:52

== Credits ==
Vox Dei

- Willy Quiroga - Bass guitar, Keyboards on "No me vengas con historias" and "Un corazón dispuesto", Piano on "Tiempo de conversar" and Vocals.
- Rubén Basoalto - Drums.
- Ricardo Soulé - Guitar, Violin and Vocals.

Guest

- Chiche Graciano - Keyboards.
- César Pacheco - String arrangements on "Tiempo de conversar".

=== Additional personnel ===
- Eduardo Bertran - Technician.
- Julio Presas - Engineer.
- Mario Procurito - Assistant.
- The Image Bank Argentina - Cover design.
- Artistic Production by Vox Dei.
