= Estamos en la Pecera =

Studio album by Vox Dei
- Released: September 1975
- Recorded: 1975
- Studio: CBS Studios, Argentina.
- Genre: Hard rock Progressive rock Blues rock Psychedelic rock
- Length: 37:44
- Label: CBS; La Rompe Records
- Producer: Pablo Ramírez

Vox Dei chronology
Vox Dei para Vox Dei (1974)	Estamos en la Pecera (1975)	Ciegos de Siglos (1976)

Estamos en la pecera is the eighth album recorded by the Argentine rock band Vox Dei. First without Ricardo Soulé and is the only album with Carlos Michelini.

== Overview ==
Following the departure of Soulé in 1974, Willy Quiroga and Rubén Basoalto hire Beto Fortunato and Carlos Michelini as new guitar players, who recorded a song "Nada Es Tan Difícil Como Estar Vivo", which appears on the Rock Competition compilation from 1975, together with Trio Lluvia, Vivencia (band) and Invisible among others. Nonetheless, for the recording sessions of this album, only Michelini was featured.

In 1996 "Nada Es Tan Difícil Como Estar Vivo", appeared on 30 Años de Rock Nacional, Vol. 1, a various artists' compilation released by Columbia Records.

On December 2, 2016, Vox Dei played together with Javier Martinez's Manal at Teatro Gran Rex (Buenos Aires), and released that same night the Estamos en la Pecera remastered CD edition, which features one track from the previous sessions with Beto Fortunato. The remaster issue is published by La Rompe Records (Vox Dei label) under Sony Music license.

== Songs ==
- All songs written by Willy Quiroga, Rubén Basoalto and Carlos Michelini except the indicated.

Side one
No.	Title	Writer(s)	Length
1.	"Estamos en la Pecera"	Basoalto, Michelini	8:07
2.	"Mientras Susy..."		5:22
3.	"Choque de Corazas"		6:10

Side two
No.	Title	Length
4.	"Apurado y Confundido"	5:18
5.	"Inventaré Mi Vida"	5:45
6.	"Debes Conocer las Cosas que Andan Mal"	7:29

2016 CD edition bonus track
No.	Title	Writer(s)	Length
7.	"Nada Es Tan Difícil Como Estar Vivo"	Quiroga, Basoalto, Fortunato, Michelini	3:13

== Credits ==
Band

- Willy Quiroga - Bass guitar and vocals.
- Carlos Michelini - Guitars and vocals.
- Rubén Basoalto - Drums, percussion and backing vocals.
- Beto Fortunato - Guitar on bonus track.

Guests

- Las Tarantulas - Percussion.
