= Camino =

Camino may refer to:

== Places ==
- Camino, Piedmont, Italy, a comune (municipality)
- Camino, Veneto, Italy, a village
- Monte Camino, a peak in Piedmont, Italy
- Camino, California, United States, a census-designated place

== People ==
- Cecilia Magni Camino (1956–1988), Chilean guerilla leader and sociologist
- Giuseppe Camino (1818–1890), Italian painter
- Jaime Camino (1936–2015), Spanish film director and screenwriter
- Julián Camino (born 1961), Argentine former footballer
- Paco Camino (1940–2024), Spanish bullfighter
- Rafael Camino (born 1969), Spanish former bullfighter, son of Paco Camino
- Renae Camino (born 1986), Australian basketball player
- Rubén Camino (born 1959), Cuban retired pole vaulter
- Víctor Camino Miñana (born 1994), Spanish politician
- Camino Garrigó (born 1954), Spanish film actress
- Da Camino or Camino, an Italian noble family
  - Rizzardo IV da Camino (1274–1312), Italian Lord of Treviso and military leader

== Film and television ==
- Camino (2008 film), a Spanish film
- Camino (2015 film), an American film
- Camino Del Roy, a main character in the television series Ozark

== Music ==
- Camino Records, a record label
- Camino (album), a 2014 album by violinist Oliver Schroer

== Other uses ==
- The Camino de Santiago, a popular network of pilgrimage routes through Spain
- Camino (web browser), a discontinued web browser for OS X
- Camino, also titled The Way, a 1934 religious book by Josemaría Escrivá
- several models of the Honda PA50 moped

== See also ==
- 88Camino, a Canadian rapper, singer, and songwriter
- El Camino (disambiguation)
- Camino al Tagliamento, a comune in Italy
- Camino de Santiago, a pilgrimage route in France and Spain
- Comino (disambiguation)
- Kamino (disambiguation)
- The Band Camino, American rock band
- Ricardo Caminos (c. 1916–1992), Argentine Egyptologist
