= La Nave Infernal =

Live album by Vox Dei
- Released: 1973
- Recorded: 1973
- Genre: Progressive rock, hard rock, blues rock
- Length: 34:01
- Label: Disc Jockey

Vox Dei chronology
Cuero Caliente (1972)	La Nave Infernal (1973)	Es una Nube, no hay duda (1973)

La Nave Infernal is the name of the fifth album recorded by the Argentine rock band Vox Dei, is the first live album from the group.

This album was released to conclude their contract with the label Disc Jockey. It was recorded during a national tour and featured old and unreleased songs. Live albums were unusual in those days for a rock group in Argentina.

In 2007, D&D released a remastered edition with a different cover.

== Songs ==
- All songs written by Ricardo Soulé except where noted.
1. "9000 Veces Más" - 3:13
  - Recorded in Tucumán.
2. "Vueltas y Vueltas Alrededor del Sol" - 2:53
  - Recorded in Córdoba.
3. "Un Renegado… Ese Soy Yo" - 3:08
  - Recorded in Teatro Argentino, Buenos Aires.
4. "Sin Separarnos Más" - 4:18
  - Recorded in Teatro Coliseo, Buenos Aires.
5. "Está es Quizás la Última Vez" - 5:40
  - Recorded in Teatro Coliseo, Buenos Aires.
6. "Génesis" (Ricardo Soulé, Willy Quiroga, Juan Carlos Godoy) - 7:01
  - Recorded in Tucumán.
7. "Amor y Seis" (Willy Quiroga) - 3:01
  - Recorded in Córdoba.
8. "La Nave Infernal" - 5:20
  - Recorded in Teatro Argentino, Buenos Aires.

== Credits ==
=== Band ===
- Willy Quiroga - Bass guitar and Vocals.
- Ricardo Soulé - Guitar and Vocals.
- Rubén Basoalto - Drums.

== Sources ==
- Vox Dei discography (Spanish)
- The Magic Land
