= Kamineni =

- Kamineni Institute of Dental Sciences, a private dental school near Hyderabad, Andhra Pradesh
- Kamineni Institute of Medical Sciences, a private medical college near Hyderabad, Andhra Pradesh.
