= Kamineni Institute of Medical Sciences =

Private medical college in Telangana, India

Coordinates: 17°11′52.47″N 79°12′49.63″E

- కామినేని వైద్య విజ్ఞాన సంస్థ
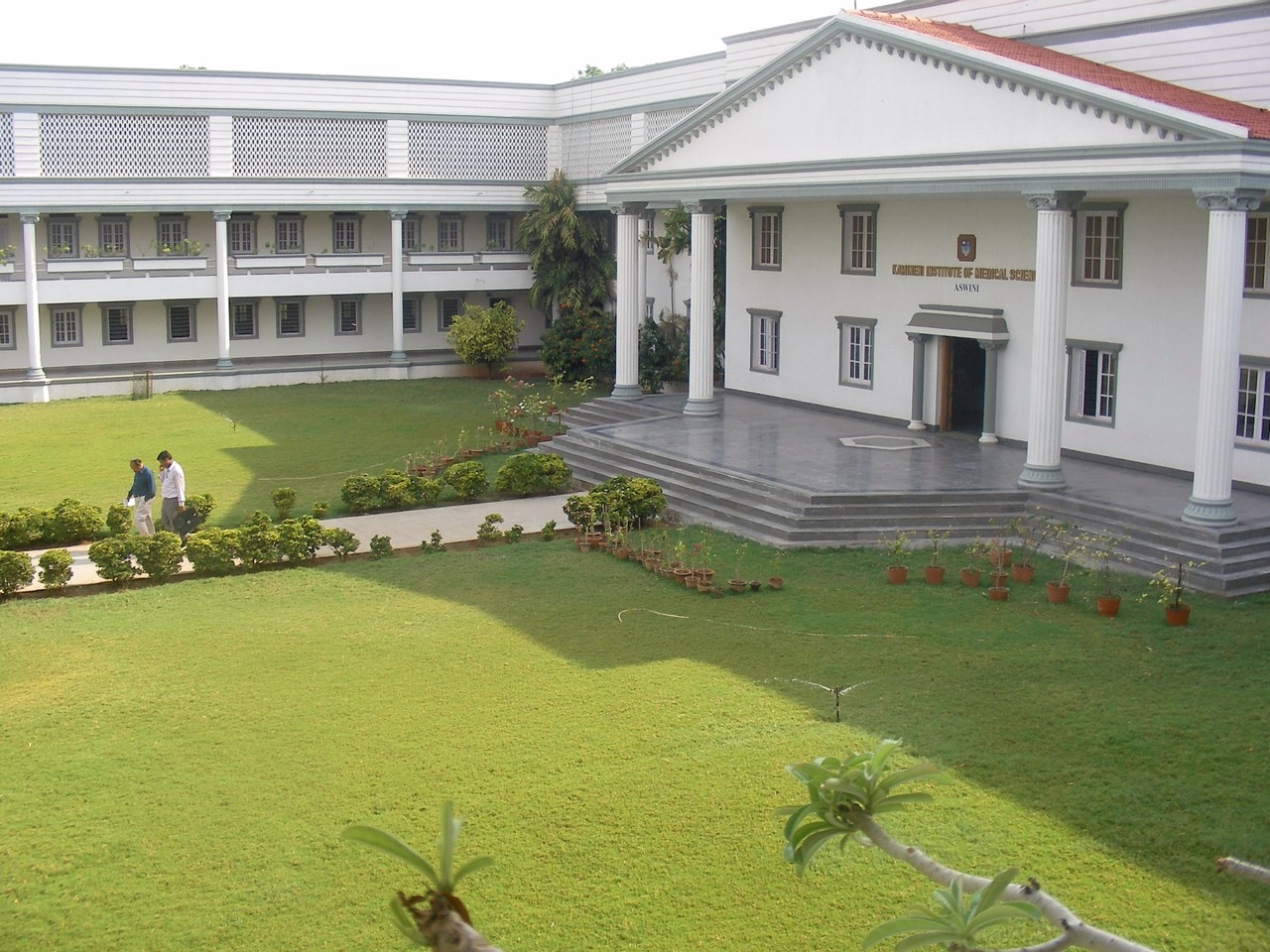
- Motto: Sanskrit: विद्य प्रच्छन्न गुप्त धनम् Vidya pracchanna gupta dhanam
- Motto in English: Knowledge is a hidden treasure.
- Type: Medical college
- Established: 1999; 27 years ago
- Founder: Sri Kamineni Suryanarayana
- Affiliations: Kaloji Narayana Rao University of Health Sciences Warangal
- Principal: Dr. Shruthi Mohanty
- Undergraduates: 200 per year
- Location: Narketpally, Telangana, India
- Campus: Rural
- Website: www.kimsmedicalcollege.org

Kamineni Institute of Medical Sciences is a private medical college associated with a 1050-bed teaching Hospital located in Narketpally village, Nalgonda District, Telangana state of India on NH65 about 80 kilometers (50 miles) from the city of Hyderabad. The medical college hospital serves rural population in and around Narketpally. Besides local students from the state, students from all over the world come here to pursue Bachelor of Medicine and Bachelor of Surgery (M.B.B.S.) Degree. The college is affiliated to Kaloji Narayana Rao University of Health Sciences and is approved by the Medical Council of India. The medical college is in the process of acquiring Deemed University status.

== Inception and growth ==
The first batch of the medical college started in 1999 with 100 students. The college was promoted by Sri Kamineni Suryanarayana - an engineer architect, builder and industrialist as a part of Kamineni Education Society. Since 1999, college has gained popularity because of the successful board results and the increasing patient population due to free surgeries conducted by the hospital. The number of students in a batch increased from 100 to 150 and medical PG courses like General Medicine, General Surgery, Radiology, Obstetrics and Gynecology, Pediatrics, Orthopedics, Psychiatry, ENT, Ophthalmology, etc. have been added subsequently. The medical college also participates in the sports meet conducted by the Dr. NTR University of Health Sciences every two years. In the year 2009, a project called Swasthya09 was initiated by the Kamineni students and staff to provide medical care and health awareness to the rural people.

== Description ==
- The college is equipped with many lecture halls with limited multimedia presentation aids, a 200-seat gallery hall and a 1000-seat auditorium.
- The library called Sahithi is the common library for all the courses which houses recognized text books and books on subjects pertaining to medicine along with scientific journals and papers. A digital library too is provided within the central library, however its use is mostly restricted to students to allow them to focus on their studies. In addition to the Central Library all departments of the institution have their own Mini-Libraries with books of their subjects for the faculty.
- There are five girls' hostels Samhitha, Samskruthi, Samyuktha, Samatha and Sathbhavana [air conditioned] and a boys Samyami Hostel. The hostels are equipped with treated drinking water supply and coolers.
- There are two playgrounds with a common space for cricket, soccer, Hockey, Athletics and courts for basketball, Lawn Tennis and volleyball. Gyms are provided within hostels and study rooms are available on request to the Dean around the library. Staff quarters are provided for families.
- The prize-giving ceremony is held on a day special and important to the institution, known as De-Addiction Day, held in the first week of August each year marking the establishment of a De-Addiction Center in the Kamineni Hospitals.
- Hospital facilities include 12 operation theaters, a post-operative ward, Acute Medical Care Unit, Intensive Coronary Care Unit (ICCU), Respiratory Intensive Care Unit (RICU) besides super specialties like fledged Cardiology & Cardio Thoracic Surgery, Endocrinology, Gastroenterology, Nephrology, Urology, Neurology, Neurosurgery, Pediatric Surgery, Plastic Surgery and Transfusion Medicine departments.

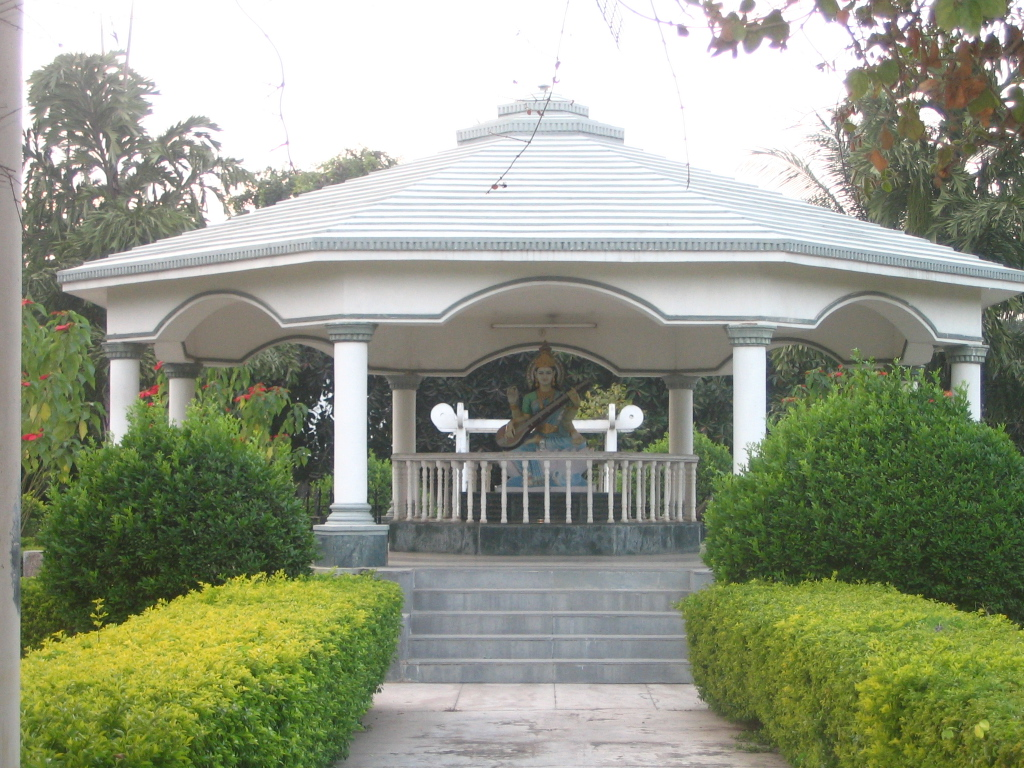
The Saraswati Nilayam

== Campus ==
- Kamineni Institute of Medical Sciences - Graduate and Post-graduate school of Medicine.
- Kamineni Institute of Dental Sciences
- Kamineni Institute of Medical Sciences School And College Of Nursing
- Kamineni Institute Of Paramedical Sciences
- Sree Vidya Peeth, Residential and day school.

== Principals ==
- Dr. K. Rajendra Babu (1999–2006)
- Dr.(Col) C.G.Wilson (2006–2011)
- Dr.(Col) G.S.Saiprasad (2011–2013)
- Dr. Shruti Mohanty (2013–2024)

== Departments ==
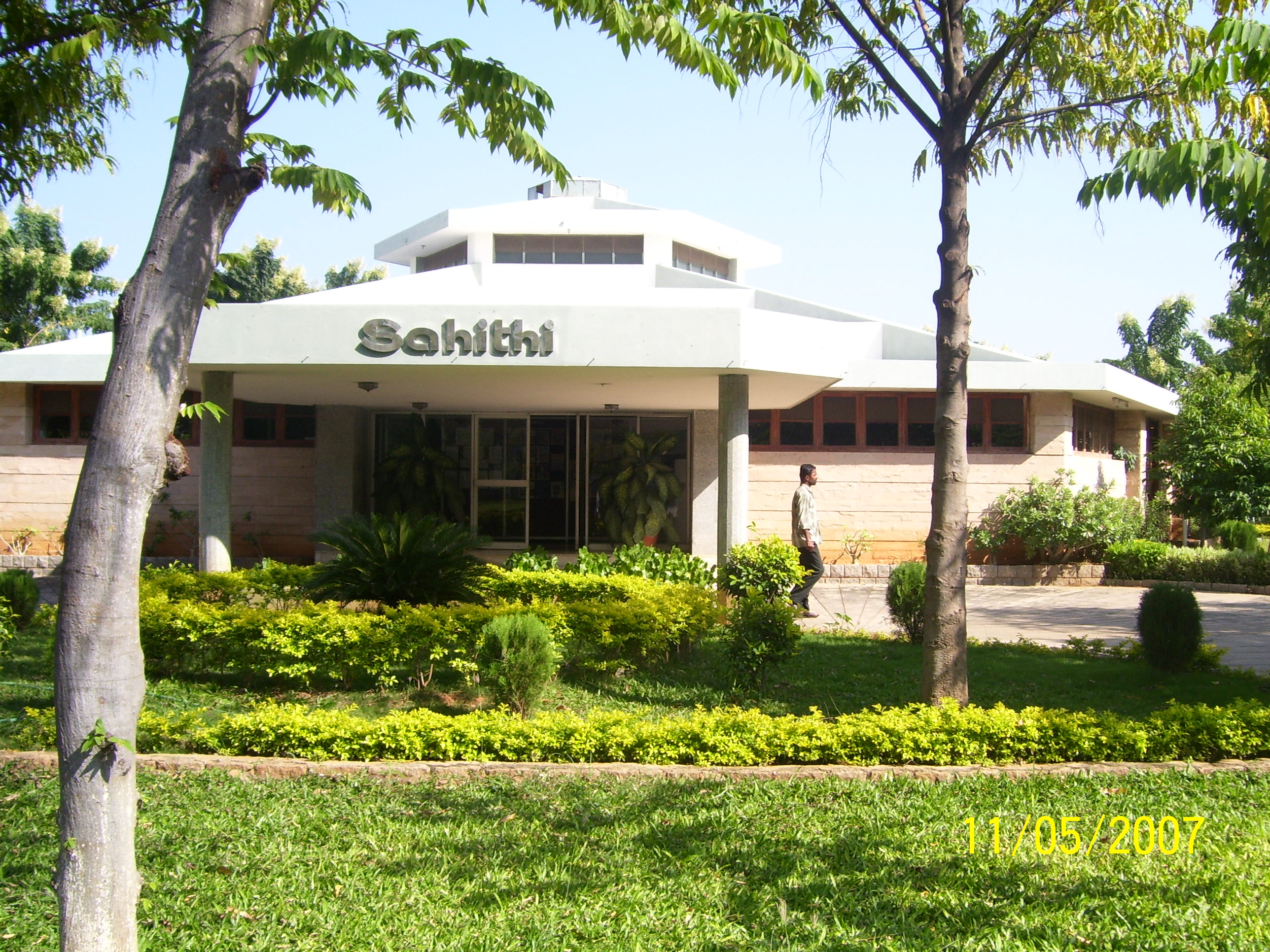
Sahithi is the main library of the medical college

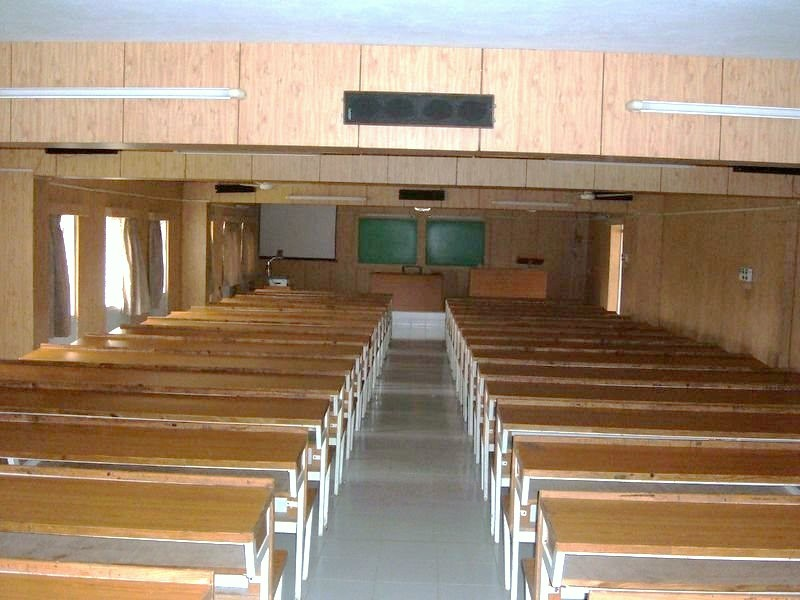
One of the lecture halls with latest media technologies

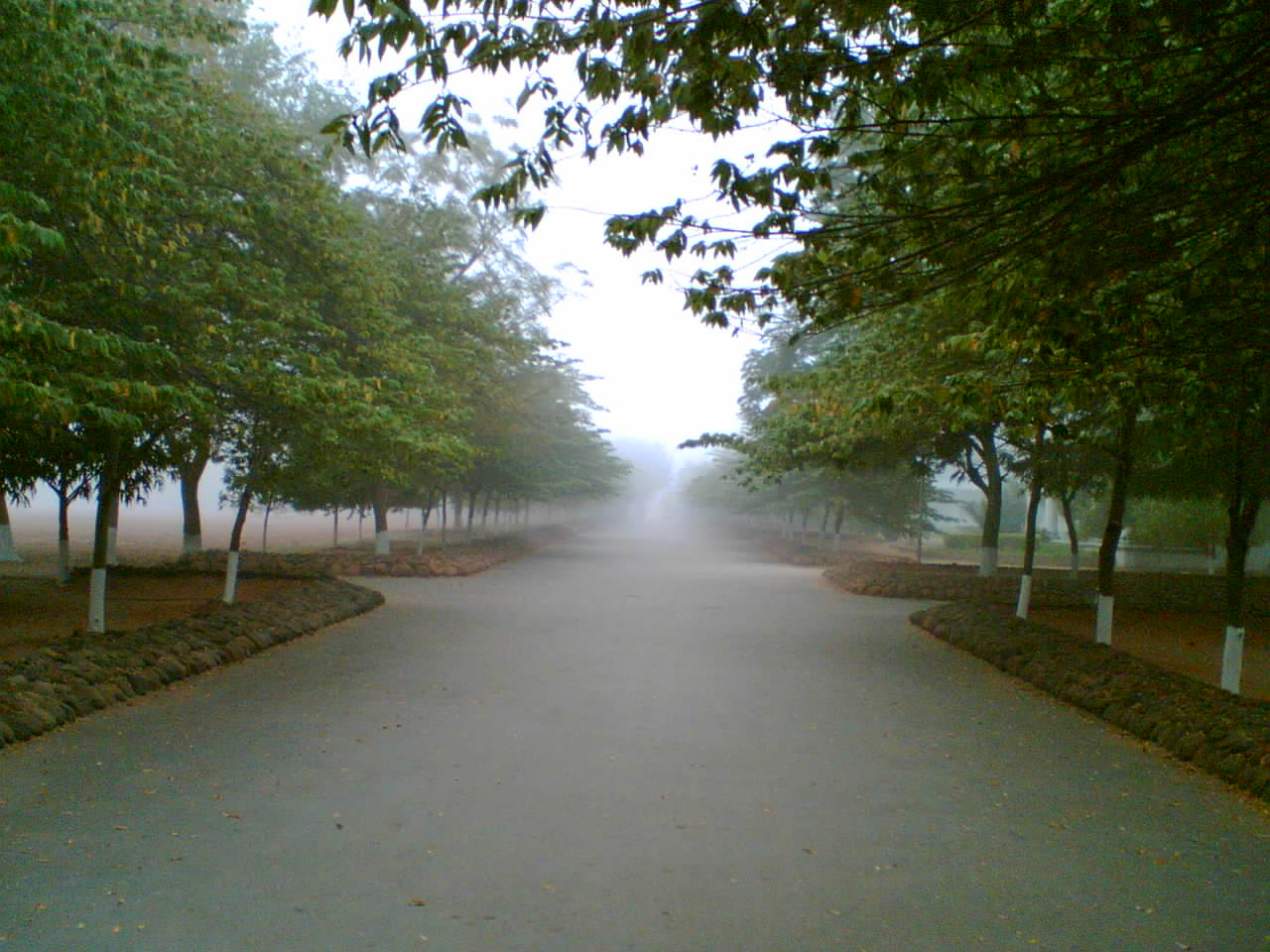
The campus is known for its serene atmosphere

=== Pre-clinicals ===
1. Biochemistry
2. Anatomy
3. Physiology
4. Pharmacology
5. Microbiology
6. Pathology
7. Forensic Medicine
8. Genetics

=== Clinicals ===
1. Ophthalmology
2. ENT
3. Community Medicine
4. General Medicine
5. General Surgery
6. Pediatrics
7. GYN/OBS
8. Orthopedics
9. Dermatology
10. Psychiatry
11. Radiology
12. Cardiology and Cardiothoracic Surgery
13. Neurology and Neurosurgery
14. Pediatric Surgery
15. Nephrology and Urology
16. Gastroenterology
17. Endocrinology
18. Pulmonary medicine
