= Mohammed Vizarat Rasool Khan =

Indian politician

- Born: 22 December 1946
- Died: 21 October 2013 (aged 66)
- Relatives: Mohammed Virasat Rasool Khan (brother)

Member of Andhra Pradesh Legislative Assembly from Asifnagar

Mohammed Vizarat Rasool Khan (22 December 1946 – 21 October 2013) was a member of the Andhra Pradesh Legislative Assembly and an educationist. He was called "Sir Syed of Deccan".

He had been a two-time MLA from the Asif Nagar constituency – in 1984 and 1985, having elected as a candidate of AIMIM. In 1994, he contested the election as an MBT candidate but lost to Indian National Congress candidate D. Nagender.

As a founder-chairman of the Shadan Group of Educational Institutions, he set up a string of 56 minority institutions, including 18 engineering, five pharmacy, and four medical colleges. The first B.Ed. college in the Shadan group was established in April 1988, and the first engineering college in 1995. He established the first Muslim medical college and hospital for girls after independence.

== Public positions held ==
- M.L.A. (A.P.) for two terms representing the Asif Nagar Assembly Constituency from 1984 to 1989. and Charminar Assembly Constituency from 1989 – 1994.
- Served as the Chairman of A.P. State Minority Financial Corp. Ltd., Govt. of A.P. 1985

== Personal life ==
He has three brothers, Late Nawab Mohammed Wajahath Rasool Khan, Late Nawab Mohammed Virasath Rasool Khan (Ex.MLA), and late Nawab Mohammed Visasath Rasool Khan (Landlord), and three sisters, Dr Nuzath Nasreen (lives in the UK), Late Dr Sarwath Parveen, and Nudrath Nasreen (lives in Hyderabad).

He is survived by his wife, Begum Shadan Tahniyat, with whom his four sons: Nawab Mohammed Sarib Rasool Khan, Nawab Mohammed Saqib Rasool Khan, Nawab Mohammed Azib Rasool Khan, Nawab Mohammed Shah Alam Rasool Khan.

== As educationist ==
When Dr Khan was elected as MLA from Asifnagar constituency on MIM ticket, during his election rallies he realized the required need of Muslim minorities was not leaders but Education. Mr Nadendla Bhasker Roa wanted Dr Khan's support to form the government after toppling the NTR government. Dr Khan then negotiated and agreed to extend his support on a condition that Rao sanction a Medical and an Engineering College for minorities and has taken permission on the name of Darusalam Educational Trust and established Deccan Medical college and Deccan College of Engineering where several Muslim minorities are still being benefited. In 1990 he left electoral politics. He established Shadan group of institutions in 1988 on his wife's name by establishing a B.Ed. College. Presently Shadan group runs four medical colleges, Shadan Institute of Medical Sciences (SIMS), Dr Vizarath Rasool Khan Women's Medical College (DR VRK), Nimra Institute of Medical Sciences (NIMS), Ayaan Institute of Medical Sciences (AIMS), 8 engineering colleges offering B.Tech., M.Tech., 5 pharmacy colleges offering B.Pharmacy, M.Pharmacy, Pharma.D., 6 PG Colleges offering MBA, MCA, 3 Nursing Colleges offering B.Sc., M.Sc. nursing, Para Medical college, Physiotherapy college, and B.Ed. College, and Degree, PG, junior and degree colleges.

In 2003 he started Shadan Institute of Medical Sciences in Ranga Reddy, Hyderabad, Telangana. The institute is 1000-bed hospital attached to a medical college of 150 students offering UG and PG as per the Medical Council of India, N.M.C. Then in 2011 he started a separate medical college for Muslim women, Dr. V.R.K. women's medical college, which is the country's first women's medical college after India's independence.

In April 2012 he received the 'Lifetime achievement award' from the Khan Bahadur Babukhan Foundation.

== Death ==
On 21 October 2013, he died at Apollo Hospital undergoing treatment.

His last rites were performed in around his educational institutes. His funeral prayers were offered at Masjid-e-Shadan near its women's engineering college, and burial took place at Shadan Institute of Medical Sciences, at Himayat Sagar Road.
