= Kakatiya Medical College =

Medical school in Warangal, Telangana

Coordinates: 18°0′8.08″N 79°35′23.63″E

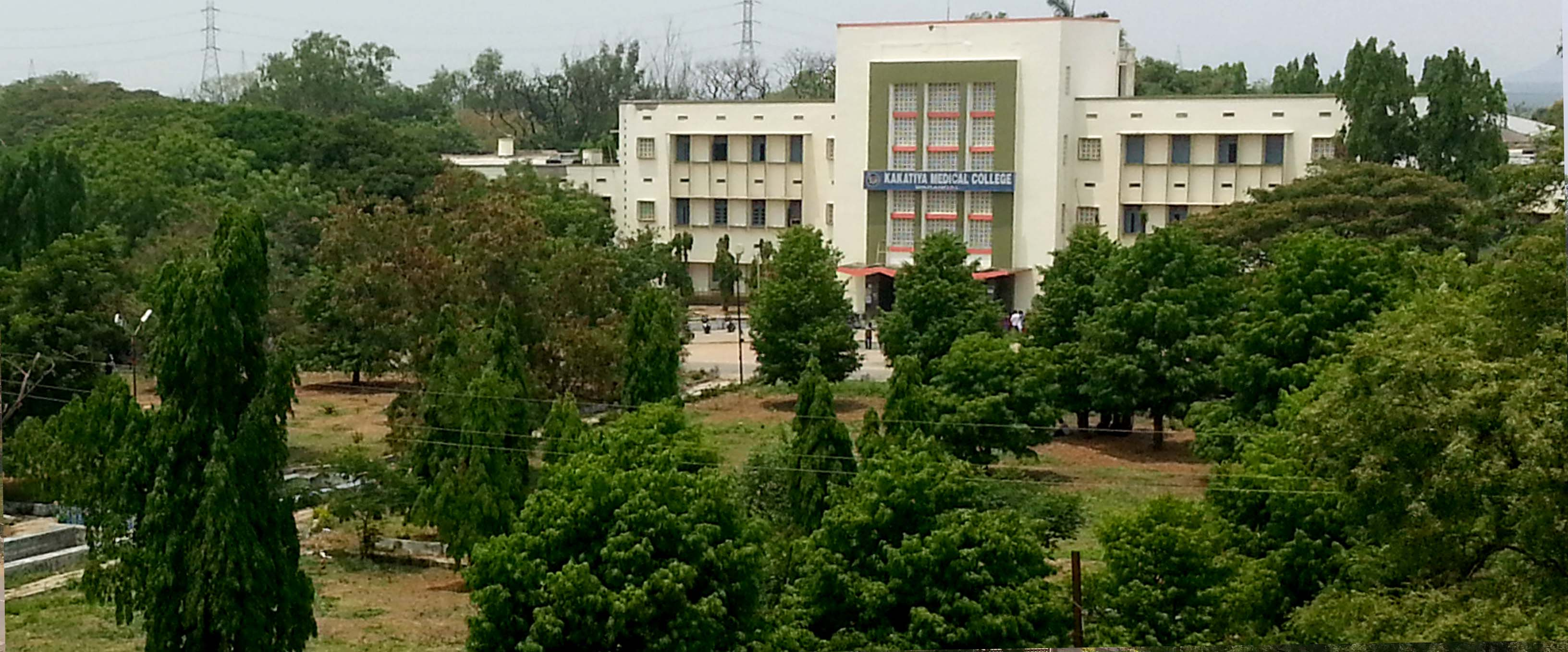
- Kakatiya Medical College
- Established: 1959; 67 years ago
- Affiliations: Kaloji Narayana Rao University of Health Sciences, NMC
- Principal: Dr. Sandhya Sunkaraneni
- Undergraduates: 250 per year
- Location: Warangal, Telangana, India
- Website: https://www.kmcwgl.com

The Kakatiya Medical College (KMC) is a medical school in the Warangal district under the gamut of Kaloji Narayana Rao University of Health Sciences and the National Medical Commission (NMC).

== Campus ==
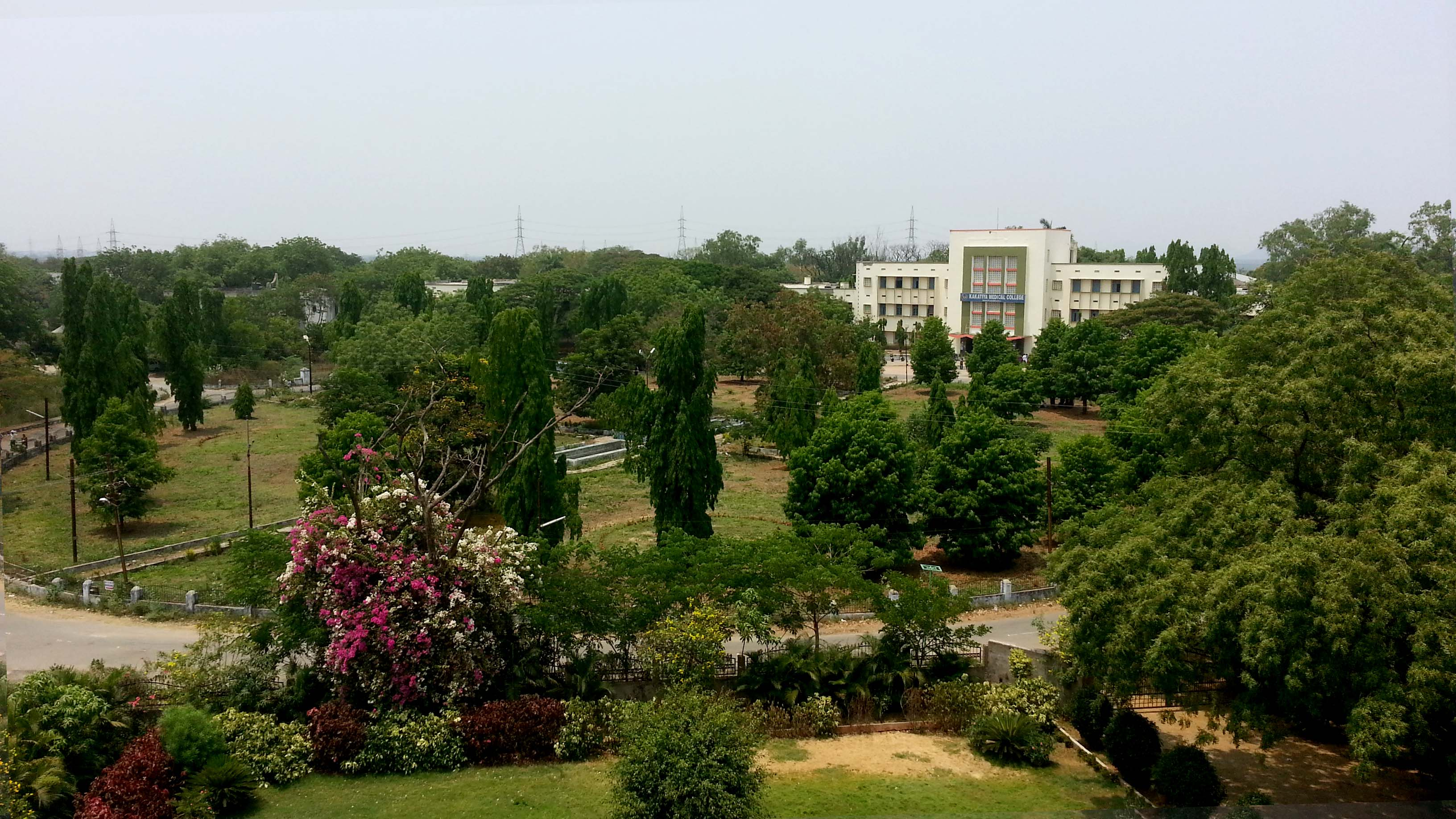
College campus

All the postgraduate courses are recognized by M.C.I., Medical Council of India.

== Courses ==
The school takes in 250 students on merit each year through the NEET (National Eligibility cum Entrance Test) held throughout India. Every year nearly 20 Lakh aspirants sit for this exam. There are nearly 3,900 seats in MBBS (bachelor's in medicine and bachelor's in surgery) in Telangana of which 3,100 are in 23 private colleges and 4,090 are in 34 government medical colleges. The college so far awarded MBBS degrees to 5,600 candidates.

=== Postgraduate courses ===
In 2008 the college had an intake of 70 postgraduate students a year.

=== Non-clinical courses ===
MD — A three-year course in Physiology, Pharmacology, Biochemistry, Pathology, Microbiology, Forensic Medicine & Anatomy The qualification for all PG and PG diploma courses is an MBBS degree from any MCI (Medical Council of India) recognized medical college in India or an equivalent foreign degree which is recognized by the MCI.

== Activities ==
KMC alumni from both India and abroad are very active in improving the standards of education and the infrastructure.

In 2009, golden jubilee celebrations were held marking the 50th anniversary of the institution.

== Notable alumni ==
- V. Mohan Reddy – Pediatric cardiac surgeon
