= Kamini =

Kamini may refer to:

- KAMINI, a research reactor at Indira Gandhi Center for Atomic Research in Kalpakkam, India
- Kamini (film), a 1974 Indian Malayalam film

== Places ==
- Kamini, Mummidivaram Mandal, a village in Andhra Pradesh, India
- Kamini River, in Maharashtra, India
- Kamini, a settlement with a small fishing harbour on the island of Hydra, Greece

== Given name ==
- Kamini (rapper) (born 1979), French rapper
- Kamini Mohan Dewan (1890–1976), Bangladeshi politician
- Kamini Kumar Dutta (1878–1959), Pakistani Bengali politician
- Kamini Gadhok, British speech and language therapist
- Kamini Jain (born 1969), Libyan-born Canadian sprint kayaker
- Kamini Jaiswal, Indian lawyer
- Kamini Jindal (born 1988), Indian politician
- Kamini Kadam (1933–2000), Indian actress
- Kamini Kaushal (born 1927), Hindi actress
- Kamini Nirmala Mendis, Sri Lankan malaria expert and academic
- Kamini Pather (born 1983), South African chef and media personality
- Kamini A. Rao (born 1953), Indian gynecologist
- Kamini Roy (1864–1933), Indian Bengali poet, social worker, and feminist
- Kamini Singha (born 1977), American geologist and academic

=== Fictional characters ===
- Kamini, in the TV series Kamini Damini
- Kamini Verma, in the 1980 film Karz
- Kamini Devi Verma, in the 2008 film Karzzzz

== See also ==
- Kaminia (disambiguation)
