= La Biblia =

Studio album by Vox Dei
- Released: March 15, 1971
- Recorded: Mid 1970 to January 1971; T.N.T. Studios, Buenos Aires
- Genres: Argentine rock Progressive rock
- Length: 55:59; 55:13 (CD re-issue)
- Label: Disc Jockey
- Producer: Jorge Álvarez

Vox Dei chronology
Caliente (1970)	La Biblia (1971)	Jeremías Pies de Plomo (1972)

La Biblia (pronounced [la ˈβiβlja]; Spanish for "The Bible") is the second studio album by the Argentine band Vox Dei, released as a double album on March 15, 1971, by Disc Jockey Records. Considered a milestone of nascent Argentine rock, as well as one of the first rock operas and concept albums of rock en español, La Biblia centers on the Bible's narrative, starting from Genesis and concluding with the Apocalypse.

== Background and details ==
A preview of some compositions were debuted at the "B.A. Rock Festival" in November 1970, and the album was presented with four shows at Teatro Presidente Alvear (Buenos Aires), followed by a tour throughout the country's major cities. The record was Vox Dei's breakthrough and it's widely considered their magnum opus. In 2007, the Argentine edition of Rolling Stone ranked it 14 on its list of "The 100 Greatest Albums of National Rock".

In 1974 Jorge Álvarez, who produced the original album, and musician Billy Bond decided to undertake a recording of the album as a proper rock opera. Utilizing the classical musicians of the Ensamble Musical de Buenos Aires, the album featured various important Argentinian rock musicians including Bond, members of the band Billy Bond y La Pesada del Rock and Roll, members of the band Pescado Rabioso, Raul Porchetto, and members of the band Sui Generis, all under the artistic direction of pianist and composer Gustavo Beytelmann. Produced by Jorge Álvarez, the album, La Biblia, was released in 1974 on the label Talent Cat# SE-515.

"La Biblia" is considered by Argentinian rock fans to be Vox Dei's indisputable masterpiece; it has been called "magnificent for both its music and lyrics". Guitarist and vocalist Ricardo Soulé did a terrific job summarizing in just a few lines the most important stories of the Christian Holy Book. Musically the band adopted a hard psychedelic direction, with chiming 12-string guitar and overdriven solos alternating with folky acoustic passages and harmony vocals sometimes reminiscent of The Moody Blues.

The Archbishop of Buenos Aires, Antonio Caggiano, while at first requesting to review the lyrics, ended up recommending that young people purchase and listen to the album. During the recording sessions, guitarist Juan Carlos "Yody" Godoy left the band. To promote the album live, guitarist Nacho Smilari (formerly member of La Barra de Chocolate) joined the band.

The album was released earlier than expected, which caused two edition errors, "Apocalipsis" was recorded without vocals and "Libros Sapienciales" was credited as "Profecías" on the tracklist. It was clarified and corrected in La Biblia En Vivo in 1987.

The songs that remained in the habitual Vox Dei set-list are "Genesis", "Libros Sapienciales" and "Las Guerras".

In 1997 a re-recording of the album took place including a bonus track: "El Manto de Elías". This version featured Quiroga, Basoalto and Soulé, plus special guests Fito Páez, Andrés Calamaro and Alejandro Lerner.

== Original release on vinyl (2 LP) ==
- All lyrics by Ricardo Soulé, music by Willy Quiroga, Juan Carlos "Yody" Godoy and Ricardo Soulé.

Side one

1. "Génesis" - 6:38
2. "Moisés" - 7:26

Side two

3. "Las Guerras" [The Wars] - 13:10
4. "Profecías" [Prophecies] - 2:17

Side three

5. "Libros Sapienciales" [Sapiential books] - 7:34
6. "Cristo - Nacimiento" [Christ - Birth] - 3:14

Side four

7. "Cristo - Muerte y Resurrección" [Christ - Death and Resurrection] - 10:34
8. "Apocalípsis" [Apocalypse / Revelations] - 4:47

== Credits ==
Vox Dei

- Ricardo Soulé - Lead guitar, Harp, Violin, Piano and Vocals.
- Willy Quiroga - Bass guitar and Vocals.
- Juan Carlos "Yody" Godoy - Rhythm guitar and Vocals.
- Rubén Basoalto - Drums.

Guest

- Roberto Lar - Orchestra director.

=== Additional Personnel ===
- Jorge Álvarez - Producer.
- Tim Croatto, Osvaldo Casajus, Salvador Barresi, Julio Costa - Engineers.
- Disc-Jockey - Executive producer.

== Certifications ==
Region	Certification	Certified units/sales
Argentina (CAPIF)	Gold	30,000^{^}
^{^} Shipments figures based on certification alone.
