= Government Medical College, Mahbubnagar =

Medical college in Mahbubnagar, Telangana, India

- Type: Government
- Established: June 2016; 10 years ago
- Affiliations: Kaloji Narayana Rao University of Health Sciences
- Director: Dr. M. Ramesh
- Location: Mahbubnagar, Telangana, India 509001; 16.7504592°N 78.0085181°E
- Website: www.gmcmbnr-ts.org
- Location within Telangana Location within India

Government Medical College, Mahbubnagar also Mahbubnagar Medical College is a public medical college located in Mahbubnagar, Telangana. It received permission from Medical Council of India in January 2016. The college is affiliated to Kaloji Narayana Rao University of Health Sciences, Warangal, and is recognised by the National Medical Commission (NMC).

== History ==
The college was inaugurated in 2016. The MCI gave permission to 150 seats and started its first academic year in 2016–17. From 2019, 175 students are admitted annually for pursuing MBBS. The college has under its name the title of being the first established government medical college post formation of the Telangana State.

== Affiliation and recognition ==
The college is affiliated with Kaloji Narayana Rao University of Health Sciences, Warangal. It is recognised by the National medical Commission, the body that regulates medical education and medical colleges in India.

== Campus and Infrastructure ==
The college campus is located on Edira Road in Mahabubnagar district, Telangana. It includes academic blocks, lecture halls, laboratories, a library, and separate hostel facilities.

== Hospital ==
A 300-bed hospital facility is part of the medical college. The college is spread over 50 acres.

== See also ==
- Education in India
- Literacy in India
- List of institutions of higher education in Telangana
- Medical Council of India
