= Ciegos de Siglos =

Ciegos de Ciglos

Studio album by Vox Dei
- Released: 1976
- Recorded: 29 June–12 August 1976
- Studio: CBS Studios, Buenos Aires
- Genre: Hard rock, blues rock
- Length: 33:20
- Label: CBS
- Producer: A. Horacio Cusato

Vox Dei chronology
Estamos en la Pecera (1975)	Ciegos de Ciglos (1976)	Gata de Noche (1978)

Ciegos de Siglos (Blind of Centuries) is the ninth album recorded by the Argentine rock band Vox Dei. The band found it hard to attain chart success with this LP and Vox Dei were later dropped by CBS in 1977.

== Overview ==
When Carlos Michelini left the band in early 1976 to move to Spain, Vox Dei included two guitars again: Raúl Fernández and Enrique "Avellaneda" Díaz, both being previous members of La Máquina ("The Machine"). The sound became hard rock, which caused many negative observations and critiques from Pelo magazine. As with their previous album, the record was not promoted by their label. In some ways, Ciegos de Siglos had a fusion of the styles not utilized on their previous releases, yet the material also shows traces of jazz rock and soul, particularly on the tracks "Reflexión de dos por miles a medianoche" and "Solo hoy te pertenece, mañana es ilusión".

On 2 December 2016, Vox Dei played together with Javier Martinez's Manal at Teatro Gran Rex, and released that same night the Ciegos de Siglos remastered edition, which features one outtake from the original sessions. The remaster issue is published by La Rompe Records (Vox Dei label) under license from Sony Music.

== Track listing ==
- All songs written by Willy Quiroga and Raúl Fernández, except where indicated.

Side one
No.	Title	Writer(s)	Length
1.	"La ceremonia es total"		3:18
2.	"Dejame creer que todo nace hoy"	Willy Quiroga	4:14
3.	"Pateando calle abajo"		4:34
4.	"Espontáneo y simple como un blues"	Raúl Fernández, Enrique Díaz	5:42

Side two
No.	Title	Writer(s)	Length
5.	"Extraña visita"	Rubén Basoalto, Fernández	2:27
6.	"Reflexión de dos por miles a medianoche"		5:33
7.	"Solo hoy te pertenece, mañana es ilusión"	Quiroga, Fernández, Basoalto	5:50
8.	"Ciegos de siglos"	Quiroga	2:52

2016 CD edition bonus track
No.	Title	Length
9.	"Qué te sucede" (Unreleased outtake)	4:28

== Personnel ==
=== Vox Dei ===
- Willy Quiroga - Bass guitar and vocals
- Rubén Basoalto - Drums and backing vocals
- Raúl Fernández - Lead guitar and backing vocals
- Enrique "Avellaneda" Díaz - Rhythm guitar and vocals

Additional Personnel

- Guillermo Lechner - Sax on "Reflexión de dos por miles a medianoche".

Production

- Nestor Gilardón - engineer
- Oscar Gimenez - engineer
- Roberto Labraga - mixing
- A. Horacio Cusato - Artists and repertoire.
- Design Cover by Vox Dei.
- Art Cover by Oscar Álvarez and Willy Quiroga.
- Remastered by Daniel Romero, assisted by Willy Quiroga.

== Sources ==
- Vox Dei discography (Spanish)
