= Jeremías Pies de Plomo =

Studio album by Vox Dei
- Released: June 1972
- Recorded: Late 1971–18 May 1972, Phonalex Studios, Buenos Aires
- Genre: Hard rock, folk rock, blues rock, progressive rock
- Length: 33:17
- Label: Disc Jockey; Diapason

Vox Dei chronology
La Biblia (1971)	Jeremías Pies de Plomo (1972)	Cuero Caliente (1972)

Professional ratings
Review scores
Source	Rating
Rateyourmusic	3.57/5 stars

Jeremías Pies de Plomo (Spanish: Lead-Feet Jeremiah) is the third studio album by the Argentine rock band Vox Dei.

== Overview ==
The Vox Dei first album recorded as a trio after the departure of Juan Carlos Godoy, in 1971. Previously, the guitarist Nacho Smilari toured with the band along 1970 and recorded with the band the single "Dónde has estado todo este tiempo" and "Tan sólo un hombre".

From the album were released as singles "Jeremias Pies De Plomo" and "Ritmo y Blues con Armónica". In some editions, "Detrás del Vidrio" appears as only one song of almost 7 minutes, or separated in two parts.

In 1993, 2007 and then in 2011, this album was reissued on CD.

== Songs ==
- All songs written by Ricardo Soulé, except where noted.
1. "Jeremías Pies de Plomo" (Lead-feet Jeremiah) (Ricardo Soulé, Willy Quiroga) - 4:34
2. "Detrás del Vidrio I" (Behind the Glass I) - 3:36
3. "Detrás del Vidrio II" (Behind the Glass II) - 3:21
4. "Juntando Semillas en el Suelo" (Picking Up Seeds in the Floor) (Willy Quiroga, Ricardo Soulé) - 2:44
5. "Sin Separarnos Más" (Without Breaking Apart Ever Again) - 4:31
6. "Ahora es el Preciso Instante" (Now is the Very Moment) (Willy Quiroga) - 3:24
7. "Ritmo y Blues con Armónica" (Rhythm & Blues with Harmonica) - 4:31
8. "Esta Noche No Parece Igual" (This Night Doesn't Seem to Be the Same) (Willy Quiroga) - 2:55
9. "Por Aquí Se Te Echó de Menos" (You Were Missed Around Here) - 4:16

== Credits ==
Vox Dei

- Willy Quiroga - Bass, Acoustic guitar and Vocals.
- Ricardo Soulé - Electric and Acoustic guitar, Bass and Vocals.
- Rubén Basoalto - Drums and Percussion.

Guest

- Calambre's - Piano.

=== Additional personnel ===
- Vox Dei & Raul Martinez - Layout and Cover design.
- Norberto Orliac - Engineer.
