= El Camino (Vox Dei album) =

Studio album by Vox Dei
- Released: November 2005
- Recorded: June–August 2005
- Genre: Hard rock
- Length: 59:54
- Label: La Rompe Records
- Producer: Vox Dei

Vox Dei chronology
La Biblia (Re-recording) (1997)	El Camino (2005)	Vox Dei en vivo (2007)

El Camino is the 13th and last studio album by Argentine rock band Vox Dei, released in 2005.

== Details ==
It is the band's second album with guitarist Carlos Gardellini and its first release on the band's independent label, La Rompe Records. It is also Vox Dei's seventh line-up second full-length appearance since 1994, following the departure of Ricardo Soulé in 1998. The band presented and announced the new album on July 22, 2005, at the ND Ateneo Theatre (Buenos Aires), three months before they ended the recording. Also, Vox Dei remade six songs from previous albums (including the studio version of "Torcazas y Pinos", from El Regreso de la Leyenda).

== Track listing ==
- All songs written by Willy Quiroga except where noted.
1. "El Camino"
2. "Tito"
3. "Soltando Lastre"
4. "No Quiero Dormir" (Carlos Gardellini, Willy Quiroga)
5. "Ahora Es el Preciso Instante"
6. "Carrera Loca" (Carlos Gardellini, Rubén Basoalto)
7. "Compulsión"
8. "Esta Canción"
9. "Torcazas y Pinos"
10. "Un Corazón Dispuesto"
11. "Tan Sólo un Hombre"
12. "Río de Blues" (Ricardo Soulé, Willy Quiroga)
13. "Medley: Jeremías, Pies de Plomo / El Regreso del Dr. Jeckill" (Ricardo Soulé, Willy Quiroga)
14. "Hidden track"

== Credits ==
Vox Dei

- Willy Quiroga – Bass, keyboards and vocals
- Carlos Gardellini – Lead guitar and backing vocals
- Rubén Basoalto – Drums, percussion and vocals
- Simon Quiroga – Keyboards
