= Government Medical College, Siddipet =

Medical college in Siddipet, Telangana, India

- Other name: Anantula Madan Mohan Institute of Medical Sciences
- Motto: 𝑪𝒐𝒎𝒑𝒂𝒔𝒔𝒊𝒐𝒏•𝑲𝒏𝒐𝒘𝒍𝒆𝒅𝒈𝒆•𝑯𝒖𝒎𝒂𝒏𝒊𝒕𝒚
- Type: Government
- Established: 1 June 2018; 8 years ago
- Affiliations: Kaloji Narayana Rao University of Health Sciences, NMC
- Superintendent: Dr. Sangeeta Shah
- Vice-Chancellor: Dr. Ramesh Reddy
- Director: Dr. Vimala Thomas
- Students: 983
- Undergraduates: 900
- Postgraduates: 83
- Location: Survey No 54, Ensanpalli (Village) Siddipet Dist, Telangana, India
- Campus: 50 acres; Sub-urban
- Website: http://gmcsiddipet.org

- Location within Telangana Location within India

Government Medical College, Siddipet, also called Anantula Madan Mohan Institute of Medical Sciences, is a medical college located in Siddipet, Telangana. It received the permission from Medical Council of India in January 2018. The college is affiliated to Kaloji Narayana Rao University of Health Sciences.

== History ==
The college was inaugurated on 3 June 2018. The construction was completed in a record time of 5 1/2 months. The MCI gave permission to 150 seats and started its first academic year in 2018–19. The college and hospital is spread over 50 acres, constructed at a cost of ₹700 crores. The Telangana government has passed orders to officially rename the Siddipet Government Medical College as Anantula Madan Mohan Institute of Medical Sciences in honour of former minister and Siddipet MLA of the same name.

== Hospital ==
A 100-bed hospital in Siddipet was upgraded to a 300-bed facility, which will be part of the medical college. The facility has classrooms, laboratories and a library. Other courses like B.Sc (Allied Sciences) and paramedical Courses are also run in this institute.

== Principals ==
1. Dr. Tamil Arasi: 1 June 2018- 31 May 2022
2. Dr. Vimala Thomas: 1 June 2022- Current

== See also ==
- Education in India
- Literacy in India
- List of institutions of higher education in Telangana
- Medical Council of India
