= Comino (disambiguation) =

Comino is an island off Malta in the Mediterranean Sea.

Comino may also refer to:

- Comino Valley in central Italy
- Demetrius Comino (1902–1988), Australian inventor
  - Comino Foundation, a training charity started by the inventor
- Athanassio Comino (1844–1897), an oyster merchant in Australia
- Domenico Comino, an Italian politician
- Another name for cumin, the spice
- A traditional Mexican spice mixture of whole Black Peppercorns and Cumin seed

== See also ==
- Camino (disambiguation)
- Kamino (disambiguation)
