= Maheshwara Medical College and Hospital =

Medical college Madek near Hyderabad, India

Coordinates: 17.5630696507°N 78.1960701942°E

Maheshwara Medical College
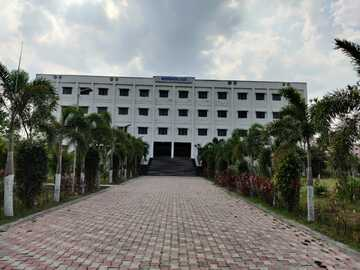
- Type: Private
- Established: May 19, 2016
- Founders: T. G. S. Mahesh
- Affiliations: Kaloji Narayana Rao University of Health Sciences, Warangal
- Chairperson: Vanitha Mahesh
- Dean: Venkata Ramana Rao
- Director: B. V. Krishna Rao
- Students: MBBS - 150
- Location: Hyderabad, Patancheru, Telangana, India

Maheshwara Medical College and Hospital is a graduate medical school is Founded in 2016, It is affiliated to Kaloji Narayana Rao University of Health Sciences and is located in the Warangal Medical Area of Sangareddy, Telangana, India. Maheshwara Medical College & Hospital, Hyderabad, is a 850-bed multispecialty hospital, with 21 departments, and with emergency healthcare services.

== History ==
Maheshwara Medical College & Hospital was established by T. G. S. Mahesh & family, T.G.S Mahesh is an Indian Investment banker and first generation technocrat entrepreneur. Maheshwara medical college is one of India's private medical college hospitals recognized by the Medical Council of India with Maheshwara medical college being listed on No.441 on their table.

== Maheshwara Free PPE KIT Program ==
“Maheshwara Free PPE Program” has been launched in Tamil Nadu by Hon’ble Minister for Health and Family Welfare, To support the initiatives by Tamil Nadu Government under the dynamic leadership of Hon’ble Chief Minister Sri E. K. Palaniswami for COVID pandemic, Maheshwara Medical College & Hospital, Hyderabad, has initiated “Maheshwara Free PPE Program” to do its part to safeguard the medical fraternity in the state of Tamil Nadu by donating PPE kits and N95 masks to the Government COVID Hospitals Shri. C. Vijayabaskar at Government Kilpauk Medical College, Kilpauk, Chennai, and donated Free PPE Kits & N95 masks to the following Colleges.

- Government Medical College, Omandurar Government Estate, Chennai
- Government Stanley Medical College, George Town, Chennai
- Government Kilpauk Medical College, Kilpauk, Chennai
- Adyar Cancer Institute, Adyar, Chennai

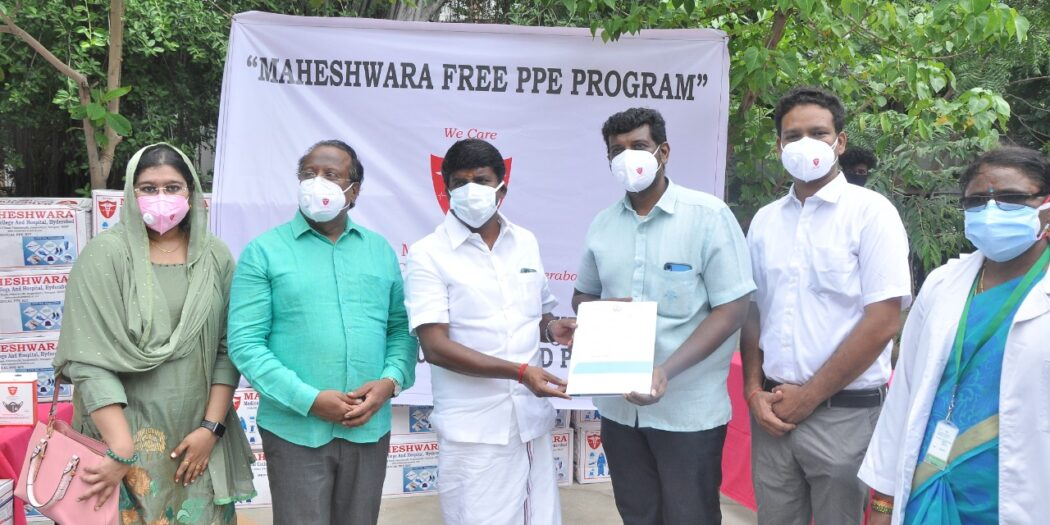
Maheshwara Free PPE Program” has been launched in Tamil Nadu by Hon’ble Minister for Health and Family Welfare, Shri. C. Vijayabaskar

According to a press release issued by the management, "Maheshwara medical college and Hospital, Hyderabad distributed free PPE kits and N95 mask to Government COVID hospitals. program was held at GIMS Hospital in this occasion Gulbara MP Umesh Jadhav & South MLA Appu Gauda were Present".

Continuing its efforts of helping the Telangana government and safeguard the lives of the frontline doctors, Maheshwara Medical College and Hospital distributed PPE kits along with N95 masks at Osmania Medical College, Koti. Around 500 PPE kits, asides 500 N95 masks were handed over to the principal of Osmania Medical College.

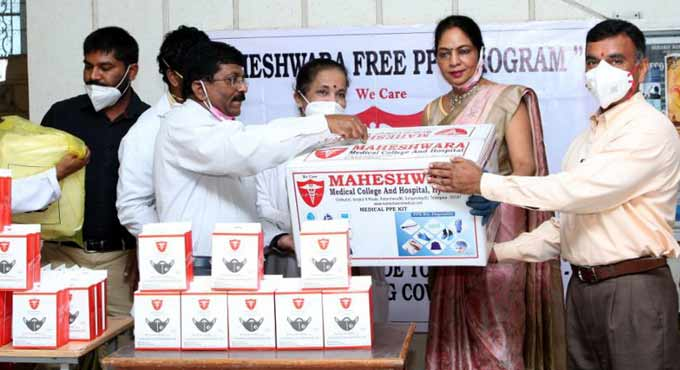
500 PPE kits, asides 500 N95 masks were handed over to Dr Shashikala, Osmania Medical College

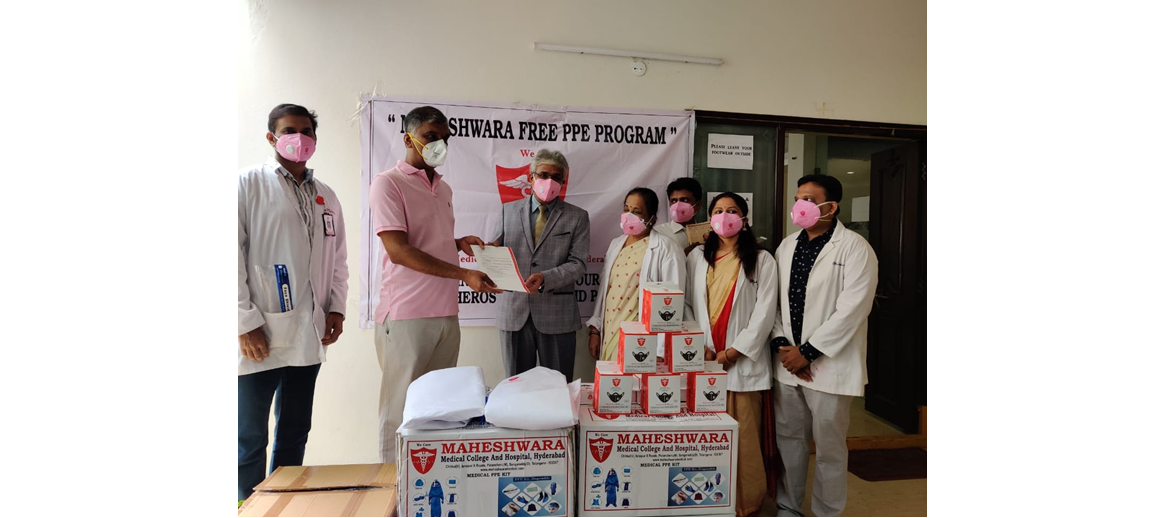
Maheshwara free PPE KIT Program, Minister Harish Rao stated, “Maheshwara Medical College is Aspiring to every future Medical student, in their advancements and charity to the Society.”

“Maheshwara free PPE programme” under which it will donate PPE kits and N95 masks to medical professionals in government COVID-19 hospitals in the state of Telangana, Andhra Pradesh, Tamil Nadu, Kerala and Delhi.

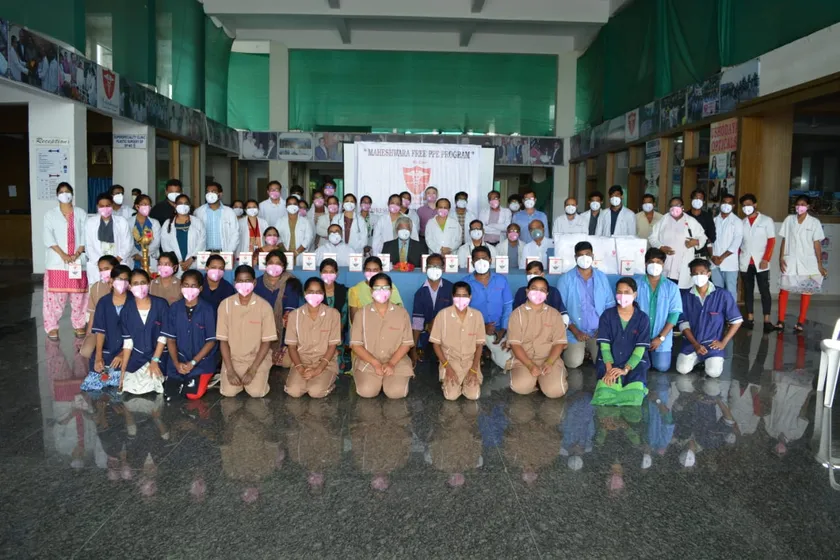
Maheshwara Free PPE KIT Program

Women's Indian Chamber of Commerce and Industry's newly launched Council – WICCI Tamil Nadu Social Service Council in association with ‘Sankalp Beautiful World’ join hands with ‘Maheshwara Medical College & Hospital, Hyderabad’ in their initiative of ‘Maheshwara Free PPE Program” by distributing 500 ‘Breathe Safe N95 Masks’ to the doctors of Adyar Cancer Institute.

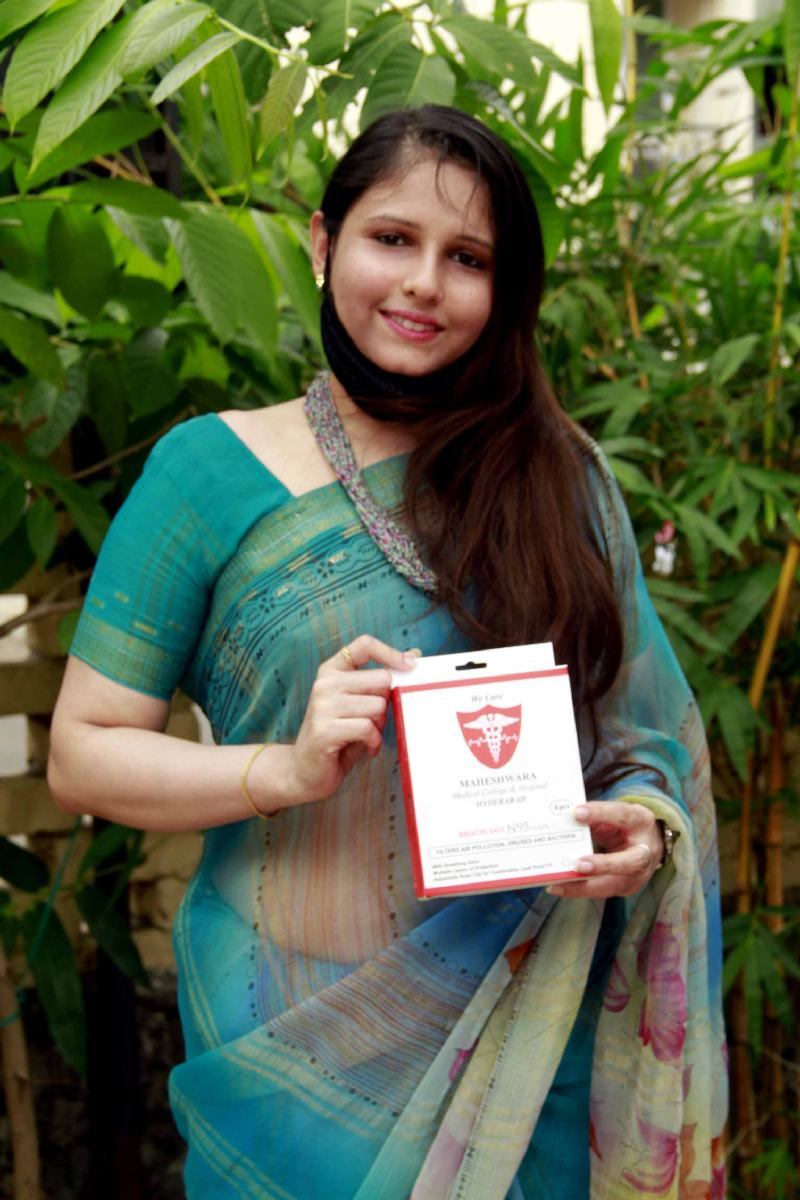
Women's Indian Chamber of Commerce and Industry join hands with Maheshwara Medical College in Free PPE KIT distribution

The World Health Organization (WHO) has recommended standard protective equipment such as N95 masks, PPE kits, and surgical masks with an offset to their limited availability. Healthcare workers have been drawing attention to the shortage on social media and through professional bodies, So Maheshwara Medical College & Hospital offers Free PPE kits & N95 masks to CISF personnel

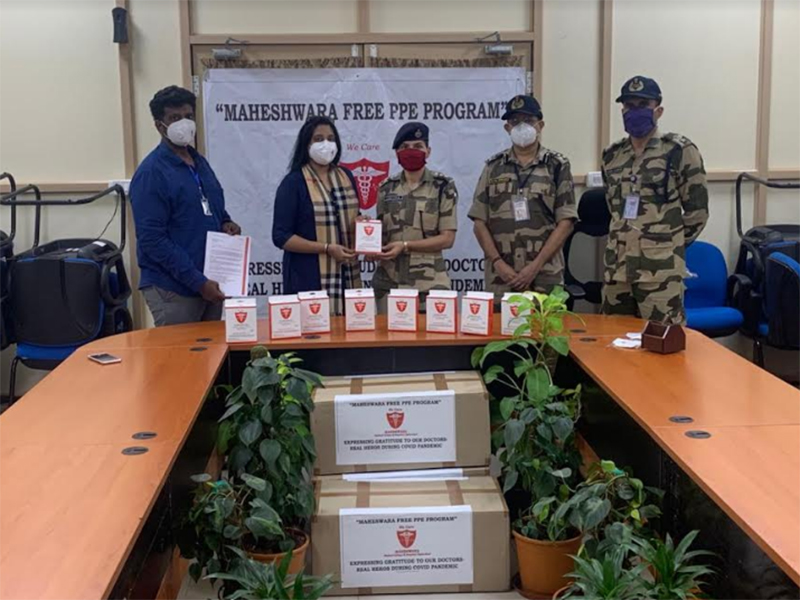
Maheshwara Medical College & Hospital offers Free PPE kits & N95 masks to CISF personnel

== COVID19 pandemic effort ==
With the outbreak of the CoronaVirus pandemic, the Telangana state government enlisted the support of 22 private medical college hospitals to help fight COVID-19. Maheshwara Medical Hospital was among the 22 private medical college hospitals permitted to treat patients in the state.

== Admissions ==
Admission to Maheswara Medical College's MBBS program commenced in 2016.

== Affiliated teaching hospitals and research institutes ==
Maheshwara Medical College and Hospital is affiliated to Kaloji Narayana Rao University of Health Sciences, Warangal, India.

== See also ==
- List of Medical Colleges in India
