= Kamina (disambiguation) =

Kamina is a city in the Democratic Republic of the Congo.

Kamina may also refer to:

== Places ==
- Kamina Barracks, Tamale, Ghana
- Kamina Territory, Democratic Republic of the Congo
  - Kamina Air Base
  - Kamina Airport
  - University of Kamina

== Arts and entertainment ==
- A character in the anime series Gurren Lagann
- Kamina Ayato, a character in the anime/manga series RahXephon

== People with the given name ==
- Kamina Jain (born 1969), Canadian sprint kayaker
- Kamina Johnson Smith (fl. 2016–2017), Jamaican attorney and politician

== See also ==
- Kaminak Lake, Kivalliq Region, Nunavut, Canada
- Kaminey, a 2009 Indian film by Vishal Bhardwaj
- Kamineni (disambiguation)
