= Caliente (Vox Dei album) =

Studio album by Vox Dei
- Released: 1970
- Recorded: 1970
- Studio: Estudios TNT, Buenos Aires
- Genre: Psychedelic rock Hard rock Blues rock
- Length: 29:40; 37:20 (CD re-issue)
- Label: Mandioca
- Producer: Jorge Álvarez; Pedro Pujó

Vox Dei chronology
Caliente (1970)	La Biblia (1971)

Caliente is the name of the first album recorded by the Argentine rock band Vox Dei, issued in 1970, their only LP for "Mandioca".

The band had recorded for "Mandioca" two singles between 1969 and 1970. During the sessions for the next album, La Biblia, Vox Dei still were contractually attached to this label, which went bust in late 1970, and the label "Disc Jockey" took over of the production of the next four albums.

Also, here appears the first version of "Presente", the second version (more famous) appears on Cuero Caliente (1972).

== Songs ==
- All songs written by Willy Quiroga and Ricardo Soulé, except where noted.
1. "Reflejos" [Reflections] - 6:14
2. "No es por falta de suerte" [It's not for lack of luck] (Juan Carlos "Yody" Godoy, Ricardo Soulé) - 4:19
3. "Cuero" [Leather] (Godoy, Soulé) - 5:02
4. "Compulsión" - 3:05
5. "Total qué" [Anyways] - 4:11
6. "Canción para una mujer (Que no está)" [Song for a woman (Who is not here)] (Soulé, Godoy) - 3:52
7. "Presente" [Present] (Soulé, Godoy) - 3:16

CD bonus tracks Re-issue

8. "Azucar amarga" (Willy Quiroga) (1969 Single A-Side) – 2:30
9. "Quiero ser" (Soulé) (B-side from "Azucar amarga") - 2:50
10. "Doctor Jekill" (Soulé, Godoy) (B-Side from "Presente") - 2:20

== Credits ==
Band

- Willy Quiroga – Bass and vocals
- Juan Carlos "Yody" Godoy – Rhythm guitar and vocals
- Ricardo Soulé – Lead guitar, harmonica and vocals
- Rubén Basoalto – Drums

Guest

- Rolando Morris Robinson - Percussion

== Recording staff ==
- Osvaldo Casajuz – Engineer
- Ricardo Rodríguez – Photography
- Hernán Puyo - Cover

== Sources ==
- Vox Dei discography (Spanish)
