= Kaminia =

Kaminia (Greek: Καμίνια, 'kilns') may refer to several places in Greece:

- Kaminia, Lemnos
- Kaminia, Achaea
- Kaminia, a district of Piraeus

== See also ==
- Kamini (disambiguation)
