= Vox Dei para Vox Dei =

Studio album by Vox Dei
- Released: 1974
- Recorded: 1974 at CBS Studios, Argentina.
- Genre: Hard rock, blues rock
- Length: 37:47
- Label: CBS Records

Vox Dei chronology
Es una Nube, no hay duda (1973)	Vox Dei para Vox Dei (1974)	Estamos en la Pecera (1975)

Professional ratings
Review scores
Source	Rating
Allmusic	(not rated)
Rateyourmusic	2.77/5 stars

Vox Dei para Vox Dei is the seventh studio album by the Argentine rock band Vox Dei. It is the band's only album with Carlos Rodriguez on rhythm guitar.

== Background ==
Ricardo Soulé would leave after the making of and touring this album, returning later during the early 1978. In early 1974, Soulé received an invitation from Danny Peyronel to go to England, where the band Heavy Metal Kids made a Vox Dei cover: "Canción Para Una Mujer Que No Está", retitled as "It's The Same" on their debut album, which the band performed at Wembley Stadium in London. After few shows with the group together with Carlos Rodriguez, Soulé accepted a proposal from Pappo to travel with him for a season in England, leaving Vox Dei.

The cover of the album managed to catch the spirit of the group at that time: a photo that shows Vox Dei in a stage, while they themselves are their only spectators.

== Track listing ==
- All songs written by Ricardo Soulé except where noted.

=== LP ===
Side one

1. "Es necesario salirte a buscar" - 4:39
2. "La luz que crea" - 5:21
3. "No hay nada más terrible que el maldito bong" (Willy Quiroga, Rubén Basoalto) - 2:52
4. "No, ni por equivocación" (Willy Quiroga) - 4:18
5. "Quiero estar seguro de vivir" - 2:39

Side two

1. "Mago de los cuatro vientos" (Willy Quiroga) - 4:57
2. "Algo esta cambiandome a mí" - 5:55
3. "Quiero darte mis días" - 3:51
4. "Tengo ganas de... estar con buena gente" (Willy Quiroga, Rubén Basoalto) - 3:15

=== CD ===
1. "Es necesario salirte a buscar" - 4:39
2. "La luz que crea" - 5:21
3. "No hay nada más terrible que el maldito bong" (Willy Quiroga, Rubén Basoalto) - 2:52
4. "Tengo ganas de... estar con buena gente" (Willy Quiroga, Rubén Basoalto) - 3:15
5. "Quiero estar seguro de vivir" - 2:39
6. "Mago de los cuatro vientos" (Willy Quiroga) - 4:57
7. "Algo esta cambiandome a mí" - 5:55
8. "Quiero darte mis días" - 3:51
9. "No, ni por equivocación" (Willy Quiroga) - 4:18

== Credits ==
Vox Dei

- Willy Quiroga - Bass guitar and vocals.
- Ricardo Soulé - Vocals, electric and acoustic guitars, keyboards on "Quiero darte mis días".
- Rubén Basoalto - Drums and vocals.

Guests

- Carlos Rodriguez - Rhythm guitar on "Algo esta cambiándome a mí" and "Es necesario salirte a buscar".
- Andres Massetti - Arrangements and orchestration in "Mago de los cuatro vientos".
- Nacho Smilari - Piano on "No hay nada más terrible que el maldito bong".
