= Es una Nube, No Hay Duda =

Es una Nube, no hay duda

Studio album by Vox Dei
- Released: 1973
- Recorded: 8 May–6 June 1973, CBS Studios, Argentina
- Genres: Blues rock Hard rock
- Length: 34:43
- Labels: CBS; Sony BMG

Vox Dei chronology
Cuero Caliente (1972)	Es una Nube, no hay duda (1973)	Vox Dei para Vox Dei (1974)

Singles from Es una Nube, no hay duda
- 1. "Es una nube, no hay duda" Released: 1973

Professional ratings
Review scores
Source	Rating
Allmusic	(not rated)

Es Una Nube, No Hay Duda (It's a Cloud, No Doubt About It) is the sixth album by the Argentine rock band Vox Dei, and the first recorded for their new label CBS. Also, is widely regarded as one of the Vox Dei' best albums, and contains classic songs such as the title-track, "Loco, hacela callar", and the sweeping ballad "Prométeme Que Nunca me Dirás Adiós".

== Overview ==
It is the band's first release (of four) by the Columbia label, after having been contracted since 1971 with Disc-Jockey Records. It is also the last full-length LP on a Vox Dei album which not to feature any contributions from guest musicians.

In 1973, the title-track (their only lead single from the album) was released to a receptive audience, though it did receive the same amount of exposure as previous hits as "El Momento en Que Estás (Presente)" and "Jeremías Pies de Plomo", songs as "La verdadera historia de “Sam el Montañes”" and "Loco, hacela callar" still appears on the band' several greatest hits albums.

== Artwork and packaging ==
The original vinyl release came with a great grey picture from the band in the Argentine desert northwestern, and another small picture in colours. The insert have included the lyrics.

== Track listing ==
- All songs written by Ricardo Soulé except where noted.
1. "Es una nube, no hay duda" [It's a cloud, No doubt about It] (Willy Quiroga) - 5:11
2. "El faisán y la codorniz" [The pheasant and the quail] - 4:58
3. "Es así y no hay nada que hablar" [That's the way it is and there's nothing to talk about] - 3:57
4. "Loco, hacela callar" [Dude, shut her up] (Willy Quiroga) - 3:39
5. "La verdadera historia de “Sam el Montañes”" [The real story of "Sam the mountaineer"] - 3:28
6. "Prométeme Que Nunca me Dirás Adiós" [Promise me you will never say goodbye] - 3:34
7. "Por sobre el monte, encima del mar" [Over the mountain, above the sea] - 4:12
8. "El mañana es otra historia" [Tomorrow is another story] (Willy Quiroga) - 5:54

== Credits ==
Vox Dei

- Willy Quiroga – Bass and Vocals.
- Ricardo Soulé – Guitar, Piano, Harp and Vocals.
- Rubén Basoalto – Drums.

Additional personnel

- Roberto Labraga – Engineer, mixing.
- Jorge Lacobara and Horacio Cusato – Engineers.
