= Malla Reddy Institute of Medical Sciences =

Medical college near Hyderabad, India

Malla Reddy Medical College Teaching Hospital

Malla Reddy Institute of Medical Sciences is a deemed to be private medical college located near Hyderabad, India. It was started in the year 2012 and has a capacity of 200 seats. The institute has a 1250-bedded teaching hospital. It is accredited by the Medical Council of India. Dr. Bhadra Reddy is Chairman of Malla Reddy Institute of Medical Sciences.

This institute runs MRIMS Journal of Health Sciences.
