= Kamineni Institute of Dental Sciences =

Private dental school in Telangana, India

- Type: Medical college
- Academic affiliations: Dr. N T R University of Health Sciences
- Location: Sreepuram, Narketpally, Shapelly, Hyderabad, Telangana, 508254, India; 17.1984006°N 79.2136634°E
- Campus: Urban 9.66 Acres
- Website: www.kidsdentalcollege.org
- Location within Telangana Location within India

The Kamineni Institute of Dental Sciences is a private dental school located 86 kilometres (53 mi) from the city of Hyderabad, Telangana, India and 18 kilometres (11 mi) from the Nalgonda District headquarters. Tasked with the provision of dental care with focus on the rural populations of Sreepuram and Narketpally, it is an offshoot of the Kamineni Education Society, founded by Kamineni Surya Narayana Rao, chief managing director of Kamineni Hospitals in Hyderabad.

The college is affiliated to the [ KNRUHS Kaloji Narayana Rao University of Health Sciences ]. The Kamineni Educational Society is in the process of attaining autonomous status and obtaining recognition as a 'Deemed University' by the Dental Council of India.

Kamineni Educational Society operates colleges/schools across two campuses at Narketpally in the Nalgonda District and L.B. Nagar in Hyderabad.

== Narketpally campus ==
Colleges on the Narketpally campus:

- Kamineni Institute of Medical Sciences
- Kamineni Institute of Dental Sciences
- K.E.S. College of Nursing
- Sree Vidya Peeth High School

== Principals ==
- Dr.K.A.R.H. Sastry, M.D.S., Professor Emeritus, Department of Oral and Maxillofacial Pathology (2001–2005)
- Dr.K. Subba Rao, M.D.S., Professor, Department of Prosthodontics (2005–2009)
- Dr. Raja Babu, M.D.S., Professor, Department of Periodontics (2009–2009)
- Dr. Chithranjan, M.D.S., Professor, Department of Prosthodontics (2009–2017)
- Dr.E Rajendra Reddy, M.D.S., Professor, Department of Pedodontics(2017- till date)

== Annual functions ==
- Vasantham (January 25, 2005)
- Jalsa (April 15, 2008)
- Amalgamation (October 2009)
- Astral Night
- Fest de Clarion

== Dental Medex (Swasthya–2009) ==
The first medical exhibition was held by management involving the medical, dental and nursing colleges between November 5 and 8, 2009. The event featured stalls belonging to departments of the three colleges, whose staff gave visitors information on health and well-being. Total attendance was estimated at 22,000; the majority of visitors were school children and local college students.

== Journal ==
The institution formed the 'Indian Journal of Dental Advancements' indexed in several research search engines, with faculty members at key positions in the journal committee.

== Alumni ==
The first intake of dental doctors graduated in July 2007. Since that time the institute's alumni have spread around the world, with the majority now in the United States, United Kingdom, Australia and Canada pursuing higher studies. Some are studying for their Master of Dental Surgery at dental establishments in India while the rest are in private practice or government service.

== Publications ==
- Harshvardhan Jois(Department of Oral Pathology), "Micronucleus as Potential Biomarker of Oral Carcinogenesis". Indian Journal of Dental Advancements. IJDA, 2(2), April–June 2010
- Chandra Shekar BR & Raja Babu P (Department of Periodontics), "Cultural factors in health and oral health". Indian Journal of Dental Advancements.IJDA, 1(1), 2009

== See also ==
- Education in India
- List of institutions of higher education in Telangana
