= Gata de Noche =

Studio album by Vox Dei
- Released: 1978
- Recorded: October–November 1978
- Genre: Blues rock, hard rock
- Length: 39:35
- Label: Polydor
- Producer: Nestor Rama

Vox Dei chronology
| Ciegos de Siglos (1976) | Gata de Noche (1978) | La Biblia En Vivo (1987) |

Gata de Noche (Night Cat) is the tenth album recorded by the Argentine rock band Vox Dei. This LP marked Ricardo Soulé's return to the band. It was Vox Dei's last album for the first era, until their break-up in 1981.

== Track listing ==
All songs written by Ricardo Soulé except where noted.

1. "Gata de Noche" - 3:38
2. "Al Rey, a Mí y a Vos" - 3:45
3. "Puedes Pensar lo que Quieras de Mí" - 5:36
4. "Piénsalo Antes de Hablar" - 2:55
5. "El Espejo de tu Cuarto" - 4:18
6. "Mis Botas de Rock" - 3:16
7. "Cómo es el Martillo que Quisieras Tener" - 3:14
8. "No Dejaré que Viva en Mí" (Willy Quiroga) - 5:36
9. "Fantasmas en Mi Cabeza" (Rubén Basoalto, Willy Quiroga) - 3:43
10. "Los Nervios y las Luces" (Willy Quiroga) - 3:09

== Personnel ==
=== Vox Dei ===
- Willy Quiroga - Vocals, Bass and Electric Piano on "No Dejaré que Viva en Mí".
- Rubén Basoalto - Drums, Vocals on "Fantasmas en Mi Cabeza".
- Ricardo Soulé - Vocals, Guitar, Harp.

=== Additional Personnel ===
- Oscar "Mono" López - Bass on "No Dejaré que Viva en Mí".

== Sources ==
- Vox Dei discography (Spanish)
