= La Biblia Según Vox Dei en Vivo 1986 =

Live album by Vox Dei
- Released: 1987
- Recorded: 28–30 November, 1986
- Venue: Teatro Opera, Buenos Aires
- Genre: Rock, art rock, hard rock
- Length: 51:01
- Label: B.B. Records; Radio Tripoli; Fonocal
- Producer: Vox Dei and B.B. Muñoz

Vox Dei chronology
Gata de Noche (1978)	La Biblia Según Vox Dei en Vivo 1986 (1987)	Tengo Razones para Seguir (1988)

La Biblia Según Vox Dei en Vivo 1986 is the second live album by Argentine rock band Vox Dei. It was released in 1987 by B.B. Records, this was the group's first album in nine years.

== Background ==
In 1985, four years after Vox Dei's break-up, guitarist Ricardo Soulé, bassist Willy Quiroga and drummer Rubén Basoalto decided to re-activate the band. This live recording took place at a special gig played at Teatro Opera, in Buenos Aires in November 1986, together with another three extra shows performing their master-piece: La Biblia.

The first reissue on CD was in 1992, with a different cover, released by the Radio Tripoli label.

In 2011, the Fonocal label released a remastered version with five extra tracks.

== Track listing ==
- All lyrics by Ricardo Soulé, music by Willy Quiroga, Juan Carlos "Yody" Godoy and Ricardo Soulé, except where indicated.
1. "Génesis" - 6:34
2. "Moisés" - 8:53
3. "Guerras" - 8:56
4. "Profecías" - 2:24
5. "Libros Sapienciales" - 7:36
6. "Nacimiento" - 3:40
7. "Cristo" - 9:35
8. "Apocalipsis" - 4:21

Remastered edition bonus tracks

9. "Sin separarnos más" (Ricardo Soulé) - 4:02
10. "Presente" (Ricardo Soulé) - 3:51
11. "Sin separarnos más" (Soulé) - 4:15
12. "Es una nube, no hay duda" (Willy Quiroga)- 5:10
13. "Presente" (Soulé) - 4:48

== Personnel ==
Vox Dei

- Ricardo Soulé- Electric and acoustic guitar, violin, harp and vocals.
- Willy Quiroga - Bass guitar, acoustic guitar and vocals.
- Rubén Basoalto - Drums.

Guests

- Luis Valenti - Keyboards and backing vocals.
- Juan "Pollo" Raffo - Keyboards and synthesiser.
