= V. Mohan Reddy =

Indian surgeon

Vadiyala Mohan Reddy is an Indian professor at UCSF Medical Center in the United States.
