= Kamino bodies =

Kamino bodies are eosinophilic globoids. Kamino bodies are commonly observed microscopically with the condition spitz nevi, a benign melanocytic nevus, a type of skin lesion, affecting the epidermis and dermis.

== See also ==
- List of cutaneous conditions
