= El camino (2008 film) =

- Film poster
- Directed by: Erik S. Weigel
- Written by: Erik S. Weigel; Salvatore Interlandi
- Starring: Elisabeth Moss; Leo Fitzpatrick; Christopher Denham; Richard Gallagher; Amy Hargreaves; Wes Studi
- Release date: 2008
- Country: United States
- Language: English

El camino is a 2008 film starring Elisabeth Moss and is the directorial debut film by Erik S. Weigel and written by Weigel and Salvatore Interlandi.

== Plot ==
When Elliot is contacted by Matthew, a childhood friend dying from cancer, Elliot travels to be by Matthew's side. Elliot meets two of Matthew's friends, Lily and Gray, at the funeral. Lily, Gray and Elliot steal Matthew's ashes and set out on a cross country road trip to take them to be scattered in Mexico.

== Critical reception ==
DVD Talk, "When a movie is slow and bad, it's boring. When a movie is slow and good, it's deliberately paced. "El Camino" is deliberately paced."

Roger Ebert of RogerEbert.com, "“El Camino” is a pure American road movie, freed of the requirements of plot, requiring only a purpose and a destination."

Moving Pictures magazine reviewed the film at the 2008 Cinequest Film Festival, stating, "Consequently, and comfortably, the film feels philosophical, a musing on where and what home means for different people at different times, a meandering of thoughts and a search for belonging... Weigel's work is a trip worth taking."
