= Kamini Singha =

American hydrogeologist

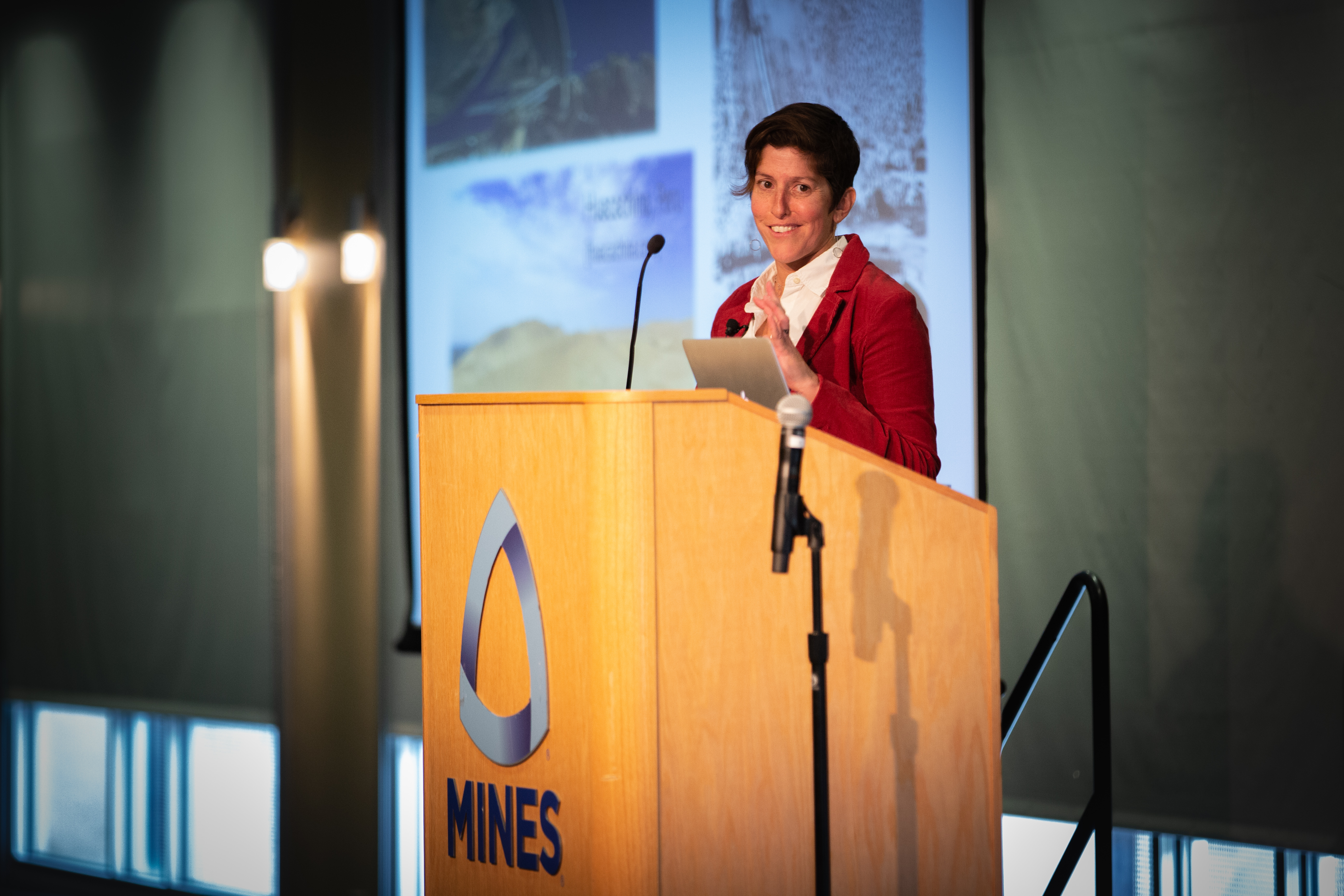
- Born: 1977 (age 48–49)
- Education: University of Connecticut (1999) Stanford University (2005)
- Scientific career
- Fields: Hydrogeology
- Workplaces: Colorado School of Mines
- Website: https://people.mines.edu/ksingha/

Kamini Singha (born 1977) is a professor in the department of Geology and Geological Engineering at the Colorado School of Mines, where she works on questions related to hydrogeology.

== Early life and education ==
Singha was born in New York. Her father was a student at Cornell University, and her mother was a travel agent. The family moved to West Virginia soon after Singha's birth, and she spent most of her early childhood there. When she was 12, the family relocated to Connecticut for her father's work. She became interested in geoscience in her senior year of high school, when a physics teacher and a family friend encouraged her to pursue a degree in geophysics. Singha attended the University of Connecticut and graduated with honors in 1999 with a bachelor's degree in geophysics. She went on to earn her PhD in hydrogeology from Stanford University in 2005. For her dissertation, she researched inexpensive methods of observing and predicting the movement of groundwater contaminants.

== Career and research ==
From 1997 to 2000, Singha worked at the United States Geological Survey Branch of Geophysics. After graduating from Stanford University, she became an assistant and then associate professor in the Department of Geosciences at Pennsylvania State University from 2005 to 2012. During this time, Singha also served as the Chair of the American Geophysical Union Hydrogeophysics Technical Committee from 2009 to 2012. In 2012, Singha began as an associate professor of Geology and Geological Engineering at the Colorado School of Mines. Additionally, she served as the associate director of the Hydrologic Science and Engineering Program from 2014 to 2016 and has served as the associate dean of Earth and Society Programs since 2020. Singha is known for her work in hydrogeology, specifically for her research developing methods to quantifying processes controlling subsurface contaminant transport. Her other research foci include examining groundwater-surface water exchange and how water infiltrates into the vadose zone or through fractures in the earth.

=== Publications ===
Singha has contributed widely to the field of hydrogeology through research that uses geophysical imaging to determine how water moves through the subsurface. Her work has explored the use of electrical resistivity tomography to observe the movement of a saline tracer between four wells and how working at the interface of geophysics and hydrology can push our knowledge of subsurface processes across multiple scales. She has received funding from the NSF for several of her research projects that focus on critical zone processes, including: addressing the knowledge gap on how water stored in the subsurface influences the balance between evapotranspiration and groundwater recharge; examining how river ecosystems respond to logjam disturbances, specifically in terms of how groundwater and surface water exchange and, thus, how water quality is affected; and quantifying the role of bedrock in controlling the critical zone processes. Her most cited publications are as follows:

- Binley, Andrew; Hubbard, Susan S; Huisman, Johan A; Revil, André; Robinson, David A; Singha, Kamini; Slater, Lee D (2015) The emergence of hydrogeophysics for improved understanding of subsurface processes over multiple scales. Water Resources Research, 51.
- Robinson, DA; Binley, Andrew; Crook, N; Day‐Lewis, FD; Ferré, TPA; Grauch, VJS; Knight, R; Knoll, M; Lakshmi, V; Miller, R; Nyquist, J; Pellerin, L; Singha, K; Slater, L (2008) Advancing process‐based watershed hydrological research using near‐surface geophysics: A vision for, and review of, electrical and magnetic geophysical methods. Hydrological Processes: An International Journal, 22, 3604–3635.
- Day‐Lewis, Frederick D; Singha, Kamini; Binley, Andrew M (2005) Applying petrophysical models to radar travel time and electrical resistivity tomograms: Resolution‐dependent limitations. Journal of Geophysical Research: Solid Earth, 110.
- Singha, Kamini; Gorelick, Steven M (2005) Saline tracer visualized with three‐dimensional electrical resistivity tomography: Field‐scale spatial moment analysis. Water Resources Research, 41.
- Tschakert, Petra; Singha, Kamini (2007) Contaminated identities: Mercury and marginalization in Ghana's artisanal mining sector. Geoforum, 38.

=== Outreach ===
Singha also pursues a number of community outreach initiatives. Since 2014, Singha worked as a research mentor at Research Experiences in Solid Earth Science for Students (RESESS), an organization working to provide undergraduate students research opportunities and support, specifically students from underrepresented groups in the geosciences. She also started a program called Mining for Talent at Colorado School of Mines. The program, funded by the National Science Foundation, provides high school students from Alameda International Junior/Senior High School the opportunity to learn more about geoscience and visit a college campus.

== Awards and honors ==
- Awarded a National Science Foundation CAREER Award (2008)
- Awarded the Environmental and Engineering Geophysical Society/Geonics Early Career Award (2009)
- Awarded the Pennsylvania State University George W. Atherton Award for Excellence in Teaching (2011)
- Awarded the Pennsylvania State College of Earth and Mineral Sciences Wilson Award for Excellence in Teaching (2012)
- Selected to be a National Groundwater Association Darcy Lecturer (2017)
- Named the Ben Fryear Endowed Chair for Innovation and Excellence at Colorado School of Mines (2017)
- Awarded the Colorado School of Mines Dean's Faculty Excellence Award (2017)
- Named the Society of Exploration Geophysicists Women's Network Committee's Pioneer in Geophysics (2017)
- Named a fellow at the Geological Society of America (2018)
- Named a Fulbright Scholar (2019)
