= Cuero Caliente =

Studio album by Vox Dei
- Released: December 1972
- Recorded: 1971–November 21, 1972, Phonalex Studios, Buenos Aires
- Genres: Blues rock, hard rock, psychedelic rock
- Length: 34:25
- Label: Disc Jockey

Vox Dei chronology
Jeremías Pies de Plomo (1972)	Cuero Caliente (1972)	La Nave Infernal (1973)

Cuero Caliente (Hot Leather) is the fourth album recorded by the Argentine rock band Vox Dei.

It is actually a re-make of their first album Caliente from 1970. The original recording label Mandioca had gone bankrupt by mid 1970, and the record was hard to find even in those days, so the band decided to record it again, minus one song: No es por falta de suerte, and adding Azúcar amarga and El regreso del Dr. Jekyll. The result was deemed good enough to satisfy the needs of those who did not own the original LP. "Reflejos tuyos y míos" it's the first song of Vox Dei with the lead vocals of Rubén Basoalto.

The songs performed with Nacho Smilari belong to the 1971 single "Dónde has estado todo este tiempo"/"Tan solo un hombre".

== Songs ==
1. "El Regreso del Dr. Jekyll" (R. Soulé, W. Quiroga) - 5:21
2. "Reflejos Tuyos y Mios" (W. Quiroga, R. Soulé, R. Basoalto) - 4:49
3. "Azucar Amargo" (W. Quiroga) - 3:36
4. "El Momento en Que Estás (Presente)" (R. Soulé) - 3:42
5. "A Nadie le Interesa Si Quedás Atrás (Total Que…)" (W. Quiroga) - 3:16
6. "Canción Para Una Mujer Que No Está" (R. Soulé) - 4:12
7. "Compulsión" (W. Quiroga) - 4:53
8. "Tan Solo Estás Recordándome (Cuero)" (R. Soulé) - 5:12

=== Additional bonus track on the 2006 CD re-issue ===
9. "Dónde has estado todo este tiempo" (R. Soulé) - 4:46
10. "Tan solo un hombre" (W. Quiroga) - 4:30

== Personnel ==
Band

- Willy Quiroga – Bass guitar and Vocals.
- Ricardo Soulé – Electric and Acoustic Guitars and Vocals.
- Rubén Basoalto – Drums and Vocals.
- Ignacio Smilari - Rhythm Guitar on "Dónde has estado todo este tiempo" and "Tan sólo un hombre".

Recording Staff

- Raúl Martinez - Art.
- Recorded in "Estudios Phonalex".
- Norberto Orliac - Recording Technical.

== Sources ==
Vox Dei discography (Spanish)
