= Kamino (rural locality) =

Rural locality in Tver Oblast, Russia

Coordinates: 55°52′N 31°41′E

Kamino (Russian: Камино) is a rural locality (a village) in Zharkovsky District of Tver Oblast, Russia, located near the border with Belarus, just east of Lake Usodishche.
