= Rafael Camino =

Ecuadorian dancer

Rafael Trajano Camino Collantes (born October 25, 1948 in Pilligsillí, Ecuador) is an Ecuadorian dancer. He is the producer, general director, choreographer, and founder of the Jacchigua Foundation. Inspired by communities like his native Pilligsillí, Maca Chico, La Compañía y Poaló, he decided to show the reality of the wisdom of the village with its fiestas, people, dance, music, costume, and rituals.

He was born in on October 25, 1948, in Pilligsillí, Cotopaxi Province. He graduated from Vicente León High School in Latacunga and then went to Quito to begin his college education. After a very brief stay at the Patricia Aulestia Ballet, he met Paco Coello and Oswaldo Guayasamín, directors of the Artistic Promotion Center "Magic of Ecuadorian Folklore". Shortly thereafter, he was named sub-director of the group by Oswaldo Guayasamín. In 1974 he became the first man to graduate from the National Institute of Dance. He then became a professor at that school. In 1988, he founded the Ecuadorian National Folkloric Ballet "Jacchigua". In April 2009, the Ecuadorian government named him a "living cultural patrimony". He is based in Quito.
