= Shadan Institute of Medical Sciences =

Medical college in Rangareddy, Hyderabad, Telangana, India

Shadan Institute Of Medical Sciences Teaching Hospital and Research Centre
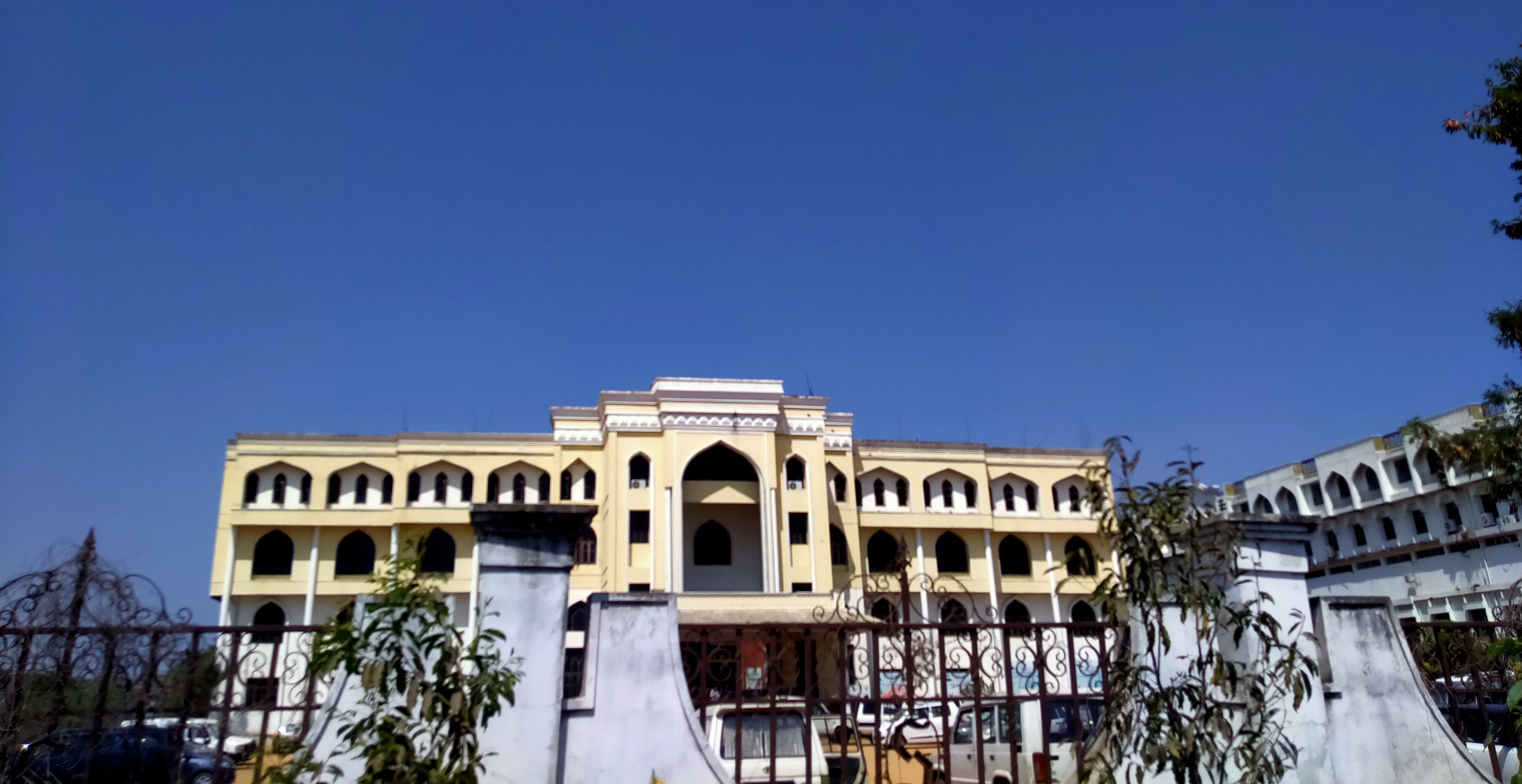
- Shadan Institute of Medical Sciences
- Type: Private minority institution
- Established: 2003; 23 years ago
- Affiliations: KNR University of Health Sciences, Warangal
- Chairman: Dr. Md. Vizarath Rasool Khan
- Dean: Dr. Sushil Pakhyanandan
- Undergraduates: 250
- Location: Hyderabad, Telangana, India
- Campus: Himayath Sagar Road, Hyderabad, Telangana
- Website: www.shadan.in

Shadan Institute of Medical Sciences is a medical college in Rangareddy, Hyderabad, Telangana. The institute with 150 medical seats is attached to an 800-bedded Multi speciality hospital for world class clinical training of its students as per the Medical Council of India. The college is currently affiliated to the KNR University of Health Sciences, Warangal, Telangana and is recognized by the Government of India.

== Management ==
Shadan Institute of Medical Sciences Teaching Hospital & Research Centre is established and administered by Shadan Educational Society. It was founded in 1985, under A.P. registration Act of 1350 Fasli, by Dr Mohammed Vizarath Rasool Khan. He is a medical graduate from Osmania Medical College and subsequently practiced medicine. He served as member of legislative assembly for two terms in the years 1984–1989.

The institute is administered by

Dr Mohammed Sarib Rasool Khan - Managing Director.

Madam Mrs Shadan Tehniyath - Secretary

Mr Azaz ur Rahman - Vice Chairman

Dr Jagannatham - Prof & Dean

Dr Vasantha Prasad - retired DME - AP (hospital Superintendent)

== See also ==
- List of Medical Schools in India
