= Vivencia (band) =

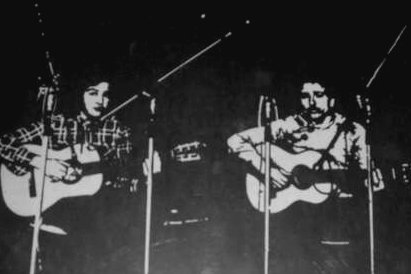
- Cover of the album Vivencia (1978): Eduardo Fazio (left) & Héctor Ayala (right).

Background information
- Origin: Buenos Aires, Argentina
- Genres: Argentine rock; Acoustic music; Protest songs
- Years active: 1972 - 1983; 2000 - 2005
- Labels: Sony Music
- Past members: Eduardo Alfredo Fazio (1943-); Héctor Luis Ayala (1943-2016)

Vivencia was an Argentine acoustic rock band, formed in Buenos Aires in 1972 during the El Acusticazo era. They consisted of Eduardo Fazio (1943-) and Héctor Ayala (1943-2016), son of the folklore and tango guitarist Héctor Ayala. Their most famous album was Mi Cuarto (1973), in which the synonymous song of the same name is found, and is considered an Argentine national rock classic.

== History ==
The acoustic duo was composed of Eduardo Alfredo Fazio and Héctor Luis Ayala, both on guitar and vocals. Ayala had begun to play rock music touched by the images that came from the Woodstock Festival in 1969. They debuted in 1972 with the conceptual work entitled Vida y vida de Sebastián (Life and life of Sebastian), which was written in an operatic format and narrated the life of this character from birth. Their second studio album Mi cuarto (My room) which followed in 1973, was the most successful of the duo and has become a classic of the seventies. Among the best known songs from the album are "Los juguetes y los niños" ("Toys and children") and "Mi cuarto" ("My room").

From that unexpected event, the duo gained notoriety at the national level and gave way to other albums, such as Vivencia (1975), which contains the famous song "Pupitre marrón" ("Brown School Desk"), a classic for decades sung tirelessly by groups of secondary school students. That LP also contained the song "Mamá probeta" ("Test tube mom"), a topic that criticised the then incipient trials of in vitro fertilization. Towards the end of the seventies they released Azules de otoño (Autumn blues) on CBS (Sony).

In 1980 they published a new conceptual work involving musicians such as Oscar Cardozo Ocampo, Machi Rufino and Diego Rapoport (Spinetta Jade), among others. On that release Ayala and Fazio included "Curiosa Noche" ("Curious night"), a song that was the musical curtain of the radio program Flecha Juventud (Arrow Youth), presented by Juan Alberto Badía. Then in 1981 they took out a conceptual work of strong spiritual content, which earned them a special mention from the Argentine episcopate - during the Argentine military dictatorship (1976-1983) -: Los siete pecados capitales (The seven deadly sins), where they played numerous session musicians of the National Symphony Orchestra. After that, with the return of democracy, they entered the studios again to make their tenth album Pare y escuche (Stop and listen) (1983).

Two years after the duo disbanded in 1984, Ayala settled in the city of Los Angeles (United States), where he wrote music for the Warner Chappell label. After converting to evangelism and recording Christian music, Ayala returned to Argentina at the beginning of the millennium reuniting with Fazio to make a series of live performances on stages in Greater Buenos Aires. The gigs were recorded for a live album, En vivo, which was released in 2005. That same year Ayala recorded a tango album, in homage to his father's music. Hector Ayala died at age 72 on July 16, 2016, in Buenos Aires, after a long battle with Parkinson's disease.

== Discography ==
- Vida y vida de Sebastián (1972)
- Mi cuarto (1973)
- Vivencia (1975)
- Sensitivo (1977)
- Azules de otoño (1979)
- Los siete pecados capitales (1980)
- El libro de las pequeñas historias (1981)
- Pare y escuche (1983)
- En vivo (2005)

== See also ==
- Argentine rock
