= Narketpally =

- Town
- Location in Telangana, India
- Coordinates: 17.203°N 79.195°E
- Country: India
- State: Telangana
- District: Nalgonda

Government
  - Type: Mandal

Area
  - Total: 25.59 km^{2} (9.88 sq mi)

Population (2011)
  - Total: 10,394
  - Density: 406.2/km^{2} (1,052/sq mi)

Languages
  - Official: Telugu
- Time zone: UTC+5:30 (IST)
- PIN: 508254
- Lok Sabha constituency: Nalgonda
- Vidhan Sabha constituency: Nakrekkal

Narketpally is a town in Nalgonda district of the Indian state of Telangana. It is situated at 85 km east of Hyderabad right on highway NH65 of Nalgonda division.
