= List of medical colleges in India =

India's medical schools are usually called medical colleges. Medical school quality is controlled by the central regulatory authority, the National Medical Commission, which inspects the institutes from time to time and recognizes institutes for specific courses. Most of the medical schools were set up by the central and state governments in the 1950s and 60s. However, in the 1980s, several private medical institutes were founded in several states, particularly in Karnataka. Andhra Pradesh allowed the founding of several private institutions in the new millennium. Medical education in a private institute can be expensive if not subsidized by the government.

The basic medical qualification obtained in Indian medical schools is MBBS. The MBBS course is four-and-a-half years, followed by one year of Compulsory Rotating Residential Internship (CRRI). The MBBS course is followed by MS, a post-graduation course in surgical specialties, or MD, a post-graduation course in medical specialities or DNB in any medical or surgical specialities, which are usually of three years duration, or diploma postgraduate courses of two years duration. Super or sub-specialties can be pursued and only a MS or MD holder is eligible. A qualification in a super- or sub-specialty is called DM or MCh.

As of 2024, entry to medical education is based on the rank obtained in NEET (UG). Some institutes like the All India Institutes of Medical Sciences, Christian Medical College, Kasturba Medical College, Jawaharlal Institute of Postgraduate Medical Education and Research, Armed Forces Medical College, St. John's National Academy of Health Sciences and National Institute of Mental Health and Neurosciences used to conduct separate entrance tests at the national level before NEET.

Indian states with the most medical colleges include Karnataka, Maharashtra, Tamil Nadu and Uttar Pradesh. States with the fewest include Goa and all the North Eastern states.

As of 27 February 2025, there are 605 medical colleges and 64 stand alone postgraduate institutes in India whose qualifications are recognized by the National Medical Commission. Following is a complete list of medical colleges in India.

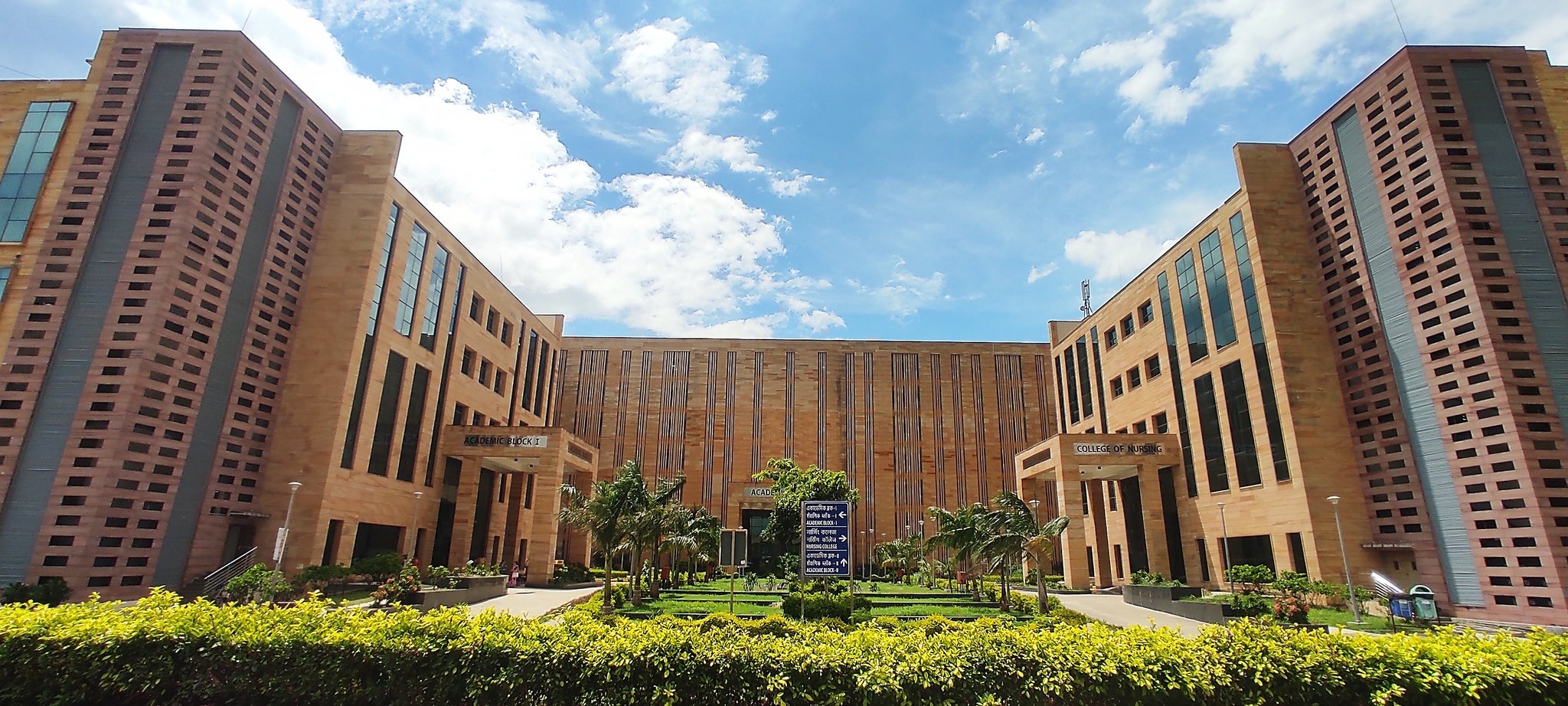
All India Institute of Medical Sciences, Kalyani

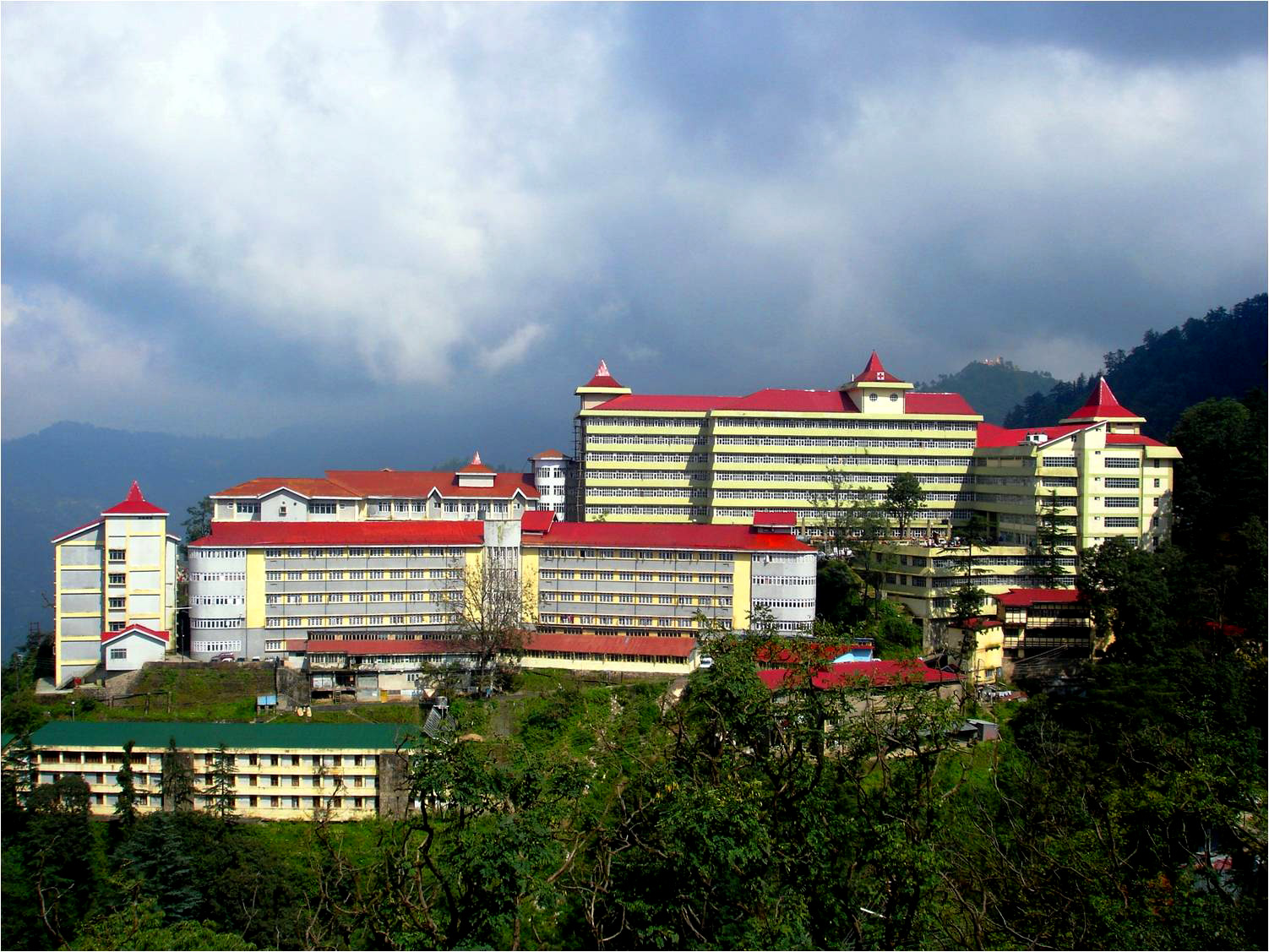
Indira Gandhi Medical College, Shimla, India

== State-wise number of medical colleges ==
List of state-wise number of medical colleges
State / UT	Number of medical colleges	Number of stand alone PG institutes	Ref.
Andaman and Nicobar Islands	1	0	
Andhra Pradesh	38	1	
Arunachal Pradesh	1	0	
Assam	15	2	
Bihar	23	0	
Chandigarh	1	1	
Chhattisgarh	10	0	
Dadra and Nagar Haveli and Daman and Diu	1	0	
Delhi	10	11	
Goa	1	0	
Gujarat	40	2	
Haryana	13	1	
Himachal Pradesh	7	0	
Jammu & Kashmir	12	0	
Jharkhand	7	2	
Karnataka	61	9	
Kerala	33	2	
Ladakh	0	0	
Lakshadweep	0	0	
Madhya Pradesh	27	0	
Maharashtra	55	11	
Manipur	4	0	
Meghalaya	3	0	
Mizoram	1	0	
Nagaland	1	0	
Odisha	15	1	
Puducherry	9	0	
Punjab	10	2	
Rajasthan	35	0	
Sikkim	1	1	
Tamil Nadu	64	5	
Telangana	32	1	
Tripura	3	0	
Uttar Pradesh	85	5	
Uttarakhand	6	0	
West Bengal	40	8	
Total	606	64	

Annual intake (seats) as of August 2022
Annual intake	Government	Private	Total
MBBS	48,028	44,765	92,793
Others	28,920	17,915	46,835
Total	76,948	62,680	1,39,628
Source: NMC's website

== Andaman and Nicobar Islands ==
Name	Location	Established	University	Funding/ownership
Andaman and Nicobar Islands Institute of Medical Sciences	Port Blair	2015	Pondicherry University	Government of India

== Andhra Pradesh ==
Name	Location	Established	University	Funding/ownership
A. C. Subba Reddy Government Medical College	Nellore	2014	Dr. NTR University of Health Sciences	Government of Andhra Pradesh
All India Institute of Medical Sciences	Mangalagiri	2018	Autonomous	Government of India
Alluri Sitaram Raju Academy of Medical Sciences	Eluru	2000	Dr. NTR University of Health Sciences	Private
Andhra Medical College	Visakhapatnam	1923	Dr. NTR University of Health Sciences	Government of Andhra Pradesh
Anna Gowri Medical College and Hospital	Puttur	2024	Dr. NTR University of Health Sciences	Private
Apollo Institute of Medical Sciences and Research	Chittoor	2016	Dr. NTR University of Health Sciences	Private
Dr. P. S. Institute of Medical Sciences and Research Foundation	China Avutapalli	2002	Dr. NTR University of Health Sciences	Private
Dr. YSR Government Medical College	Pulivendula	2024	Dr. NTR University of Health Sciences	Government of Andhra Pradesh
Fathima Institute of Medical Sciences	Kadapa	2010	Dr. NTR University of Health Sciences	Private
Gayathri Vidya Parishad Institute of Health Care and Medical Technology	Visakhapatnam	2016	Dr. NTR University of Health Sciences	Private
GITAM Institute of Medical Sciences and Research	Visakhapatnam	2015	Gandhi Institute of Technology and Management	Private
Government Medical College	Adoni	2024	Dr. NTR University of Health Sciences	Government of Andhra Pradesh
Government Medical College	Anantapuramu	2001	Dr. NTR University of Health Sciences	Government of Andhra Pradesh
Government Medical College	Eluru	2023	Dr. NTR University of Health Sciences	Government of Andhra Pradesh
Government Medical College	Kadapa	2006	Dr. NTR University of Health Sciences	Government of Andhra Pradesh
Government Medical College	Machilipatnam	2023	Dr. NTR University of Health Sciences	Government of Andhra Pradesh
Government Medical College	Madanapalle	2024	Dr. NTR University of Health Sciences	Government of Andhra Pradesh
Government Medical College	Markapuram	2021	Dr. NTR University of Health Sciences	Government of Andhra Pradesh
Government Medical College	Nandyal	2023	Dr. NTR University of Health Sciences	Government of Andhra Pradesh
Government Medical College	Ongole	2008	Dr. NTR University of Health Sciences	Government of Andhra Pradesh
Government Medical College	Paderu	2024	Dr. NTR University of Health Sciences	Government of Andhra Pradesh
Government Medical College	Rajahmundry	2023	Dr. NTR University of Health Sciences	Government of Andhra Pradesh
Government Medical College	Srikakulam	2008	Dr. NTR University of Health Sciences	Government of Andhra Pradesh
Government Medical College	Vizianagaram	2023	Dr. NTR University of Health Sciences	Government of Andhra Pradesh
Great Eastern Medical School and Hospital	Srikakulam	2010	Dr. NTR University of Health Sciences	Private
GSL Medical College	Rajahmundry	2002	Dr. NTR University of Health Sciences	Private
Guntur Medical College	Guntur	1946	Dr. NTR University of Health Sciences	Government of Andhra Pradesh
Katuri Medical College	Guntur	2002	Dr. NTR University of Health Sciences	Private
Konaseema Institute of Medical Sciences and Research Foundation	Amalapuram	2005	Dr. NTR University of Health Sciences	Private
Kurnool Medical College	Kurnool	1957	Dr. NTR University of Health Sciences	Government of Andhra Pradesh
Maharajah Institute of Medical Sciences	Vizianagaram	2002	Dr. NTR University of Health Sciences	Private
Narayana Medical College	Nellore	2000	Dr. NTR University of Health Sciences	Private
Nimra Institute of Medical Sciences	Vijayawada	2016	Dr. NTR University of Health Sciences	Private
NRI Academy of Medical Sciences	Mangalagiri	2012	Dr. NTR University of Health Sciences	Private
NRI Institute of Medical Sciences	Vishakhapatnam	2012	Dr. NTR University of Health Sciences	Private
P.E.S. Institute of Medical Sciences and Research	Kuppam	2001	Dr. NTR University of Health Sciences	Private
Rangaraya Medical College	Kakinada	1958	Dr. NTR University of Health Sciences	Government of Andhra Pradesh
RVS Institute of Medical Sciences	Chittoor	2016	Dr. NTR University of Health Sciences	Private
Santhiram Medical College	Nandyal	2005	Dr. NTR University of Health Sciences	Private
Siddhartha Medical College	Vijayawada	1980	Dr. NTR University of Health Sciences	Government of Andhra Pradesh
Sri Balaji Medical College and Hospital	Renigunta	2022	Dr. NTR University of Health Sciences	Private
Sri Sathya Sai Institute of Higher Medical Sciences	Puttaparthi	1991	Autonomous	Private
Sri Venkateswara Institute of Medical Sciences	Tirupati	1993	Autonomous	Government of Andhra Pradesh
Sri Venkateswara Medical College	Tirupati	1960	Dr. NTR University of Health Sciences	Government of Andhra Pradesh
SVIMS - Sri Padmavathi Medical College for Women	Tirupati	2014	Sri Venkateswara Institute of Medical Sciences	Government of Andhra Pradesh
Visakha Institute of Medical Sciences	Vishakhapatnam	2016	Dr. NTR University of Health Sciences	Government of Andhra Pradesh
Viswabharathi Medical College	Kurnool	2014	Dr. NTR University of Health Sciences	Private

== Arunachal Pradesh ==
Name	Location	Established	University	Funding/ownership
Tomo Riba Institute of Health and Medical Sciences	Naharlagun	2018	Rajiv Gandhi University	Government of Arunachal Pradesh

== Assam ==
Name	Location	Established	University	Funding/ownership
All India Institute of Medical Sciences	Guwahati	2020	Autonomous	Government of India
Assam Medical College	Dibrugarh	1900	Srimanta Sankaradeva University of Health Sciences	Government of Assam
Bongaigaon Medical College and Hospital	Bongaigaon	2026	Srimanta Sankaradeva University of Health Sciences	Government of Assam
Dhubri Medical College and Hospital	Dhubri	2022	Srimanta Sankaradeva University of Health Sciences	Government of Assam
Diphu Medical College and Hospital	Diphu	2020	Srimanta Sankaradeva University of Health Sciences	Government of Assam
ESIC Medical College and Hospital	Guwahati	2025	Srimanta Sankaradeva University of Health Sciences	Government of India
Fakhruddin Ali Ahmed Medical College and Hospital	Barpeta	2012	Srimanta Sankaradeva University of Health Sciences	Government of Assam
Gauhati Medical College and Hospital	Guwahati	1960	Srimanta Sankaradeva University of Health Sciences	Government of Assam
Jorhat Medical College and Hospital	Jorhat	2010	Srimanta Sankaradeva University of Health Sciences	Government of Assam
Kokrajhar Medical College and Hospital	Kokrajhar	2023	Srimanta Sankaradeva University of Health Sciences	Government of Assam
Lakhimpur Medical College and Hospital	North Lakhimpur	2021	Srimanta Sankaradeva University of Health Sciences	Government of Assam
Lokopriya Gopinath Bordoloi Regional Institute of Mental Health	Tezpur	1876	Srimanta Sankaradeva University of Health Sciences	Government of India
Nagaon Medical College and Hospital	Nagaon	2023	Srimanta Sankaradeva University of Health Sciences	Government of Assam
Nalbari Medical College and Hospital	Nalbari	2023	Srimanta Sankaradeva University of Health Sciences	Government of Assam
Pragjyotishpur Medical College & Hospital	Guwahati	2025	Srimanta Sankaradeva University of Health Sciences	Government of Assam
Silchar Medical College and Hospital	Silchar	1968	Srimanta Sankaradeva University of Health Sciences	Government of Assam
Tezpur Medical College and Hospital	Tezpur	2014	Srimanta Sankaradeva University of Health Sciences	Government of Assam
Tinsukia Medical College & Hospital	Tinsukia	2024	Srimanta Sankaradeva University of Health Sciences	Government of Assam

== Bihar ==
Name	Location	Established	University	Funding/ownership
All India Institute of Medical Sciences	Patna	2012	Autonomous	Government of India
Anugrah Narayan Magadh Medical College and Hospital	Gaya	1969	Bihar University of Health Sciences	Government of Bihar
Bhagwan Mahavir Institute of Medical Sciences	Pawapuri	2013	Bihar University of Health Sciences	Government of Bihar
Darbhanga Medical College and Hospital	Darbhanga	1925	Bihar University of Health Sciences	Government of Bihar
ESIC Medical College and Hospital	Patna	2021	Bihar University of Health Sciences	Government of India
Government Medical College	Bettiah	2008	Bihar University of Health Sciences	Government of Bihar
Government Medical College and Hospital	Chhapra	2025	Bihar University of Health Sciences	Government of Bihar
Government Medical College and Hospital	Purnea	2023	Bihar University of Health Sciences	Government of Bihar
Himalaya Medical College and Hospital	Patna	2024	Bihar University of Health Sciences	Private
Indira Gandhi Institute of Medical Sciences	Patna	1983	Autonomous	Government of Bihar
Jannayak Karpoori Thakur Medical College and Hospital	Madhepura	2020	Bihar University of Health Sciences	Government of Bihar
Jawaharlal Nehru Medical College and Hospital	Bhagalpur	1970	Bihar University of Health Sciences	Government of Bihar
Katihar Medical College and Hospital	Katihar	1987	Al-Karim University	Private
Lord Buddha Koshi Medical College and Hospital	Saharsa	2012	Bihar University of Health Sciences	Private
Madhubani Medical College and Hospital	Madhubani	2018	Bihar University of Health Sciences	Private
Mata Gujri Memorial Medical College	Kishanganj	2003	Mata Gujri University	Private
Nalanda Medical College Hospital	Patna	1970	Bihar University of Health Sciences	Government of Bihar
Narayan Medical College and Hospital	Sasaram	2008	Gopal Narayan Singh University	Private
Netaji Subhas Medical College and Hospital	Patna	2020	Bihar University of Health Sciences	Private
Patna Medical College	Patna	1874	Bihar University of Health Sciences	Government of Bihar
Radha Devi Jageshwari Memorial Medical College and Hospital	Muzaffarpur	2021	Bihar University of Health Sciences	Private
Shri Ram Janki Medical College and Hospital	Samastipur	2023	Bihar University of Health Sciences	Government of Bihar
Shyamlal Chandrashekhar Medical College	Khagaria	2023	Bihar University of Health Sciences	Private
Sri Krishna Medical College and Hospital	Muzaffarpur	1970	Bihar University of Health Sciences	Government of Bihar

== Chandigarh ==
Name	Location	Established	University	Funding/ownership
Government Medical College and Hospital	Chandigarh	1991	Panjab University	Government of India, Government of Punjab and Government of Haryana
Postgraduate Institute of Medical Education and Research	Chandigarh	1962	Autonomous	Government of India

== Chhattisgarh ==
Name	Location	Established	University	Funding/ownership
Abhishek I Mishra Memorial Medical College and Research	Bhilai	2024	Pt. Deendayal Upadhyay Memorial Health Sciences and Ayush University of Chhattisgarh	Private
All India Institute of Medical Sciences	Raipur	2012	Autonomous	Government of India
Atal Bihari Vajpayee Memorial Government Medical College	Rajnandgaon	2014	Pt. Deendayal Upadhyay Memorial Health Sciences and Ayush University of Chhattisgarh	Government of Chhattisgarh
Chandulal Chandrakar Memorial Government Medical College	Durg	2013	Pt. Deendayal Upadhyay Memorial Health Sciences and Ayush University of Chhattisgarh	Government of Chhattisgarh
Chhattisgarh Institute of Medical Sciences	Bilaspur	2001	Pt. Deendayal Upadhyay Memorial Health Sciences and Ayush University of Chhattisgarh	Government of Chhattisgarh
Late Baliram Kashyap Memorial Government Medical College	Jagdalpur	2006	Pt. Deendayal Upadhyay Memorial Health Sciences and Ayush University of Chhattisgarh	Government of Chhattisgarh
Late Shri Lakhiram Agrawal Government Medical College	Raigarh	2013	Pt. Deendayal Upadhyay Memorial Health Sciences and Ayush University of Chhattisgarh	Government of Chhattisgarh
Late Smt. Indira Gandhi Memorial Government Medical College	Kanker	2021	Pt. Deendayal Upadhyay Memorial Health Sciences and Ayush University of Chhattisgarh	Government of Chhattisgarh
Pt. Jawahar Lal Nehru Memorial Medical College	Raipur	1963	Pt. Deendayal Upadhyay Memorial Health Sciences and Ayush University of Chhattisgarh	Government of Chhattisgarh
Raipur Institute of Medical Sciences	Raipur	2016	Pt. Deendayal Upadhyay Memorial Health Sciences and Ayush University of Chhattisgarh	Private
Rajmata Smt. Devendra Kumari Singhdeo Government Medical College	Ambikapur	2016	Pt. Deendayal Upadhyay Memorial Health Sciences and Ayush University of Chhattisgarh	Government of Chhattisgarh
Shri Balaji Institute of Medical Science	Raipur	2021	Pt. Deendayal Upadhyay Memorial Health Sciences and Ayush University of Chhattisgarh	Private
Shri Rawatpura Sarkar Institute of Medical Sciences and Research	Nava Raipur	2024	Pt. Deendayal Upadhyay Memorial Health Sciences and Ayush University of Chhattisgarh	Private
Shri Shankaracharya Institute of Medical Sciences	Bhilai	2016	Pt. Deendayal Upadhyay Memorial Health Sciences and Ayush University of Chhattisgarh	Private

== Dadra and Nagar Haveli and Daman and Diu ==
Name	Location	Established	University	Funding/ownership
NAMO Medical Education & Research Institute	Silvassa	2019	Veer Narmad South Gujarat University	Government of India

== Delhi ==
Name	Location	Established	University	Funding/ownership
All India Institute of Medical Sciences	Ansari Nagar East	1956	Autonomous	Government of India
Army College of Medical Sciences	Delhi Cantonment	2008	Guru Gobind Singh Indraprastha University	Army Welfare Education Society
Atal Bihari Vajpayee Institute of Medical Sciences and Dr. RML Hospital	Connaught Place	2008	Guru Gobind Singh Indraprastha University	Government of India
Dr. Baba Saheb Ambedkar Medical College and Hospital	Rohini	2016	Guru Gobind Singh Indraprastha University	Government of NCT of Delhi
ESIC Hospital and PGIMSR	Basaidarapur	2010	Guru Gobind Singh Indraprastha University	Government of India
G. B. Pant Institute of Post Graduate Medical Education and Research	Jawaharlal Nehru Marg	1964	University of Delhi	Government of NCT of Delhi
Hamdard Institute of Medical Sciences and Research	Hamdard Nagar	2012	Jamia Hamdard	Private
Lady Hardinge Medical College	Connaught Place	1916	University of Delhi	Government of India
Maulana Azad Medical College	Balmiki Basti	1956	University of Delhi	Government of NCT of Delhi
National Institute of Health and Family Welfare	Munirka	1977	University of Delhi	Government of India
North Delhi Municipal Corporation Medical College	Civil Lines	2013	Guru Gobind Singh Indraprastha University	Municipal Corporation of Delhi
University College of Medical Sciences	Dilshad Garden	1971	University of Delhi	Government of NCT of Delhi
Vallabhbhai Patel Chest Institute	Vijay Nagar Marg	1953	University of Delhi	Government of India
Vardhman Mahavir Medical College	Ansari Nagar West	2001	Guru Gobind Singh Indraprastha University	Government of India

== Goa ==
Name	Location	Established	University	Funding/ownership
Goa Medical College	Bambolim	1842	Goa University	Government of Goa

== Gujarat ==
Name	Location	Established	University	Funding/ownership
All India Institute of Medical Sciences	Rajkot	2020	Autonomous	Government of India
Ananya College of Medicine and Research	Kalol	2023	Gujarat University	Private
Bhagyoday Medical College	Kadi	2024	Hemchandracharya North Gujarat University	Private
B. J. Medical College	Ahmedabad	1871	Gujarat University	Government of Gujarat
Banas Medical College and Research Institute	Palanpur	2018	Hemchandracharya North Gujarat University	Private
C. U. Shah Medical College	Surendranagar	2000	Saurashtra University	Private
Dr. Kiran C. Patel Medical College and Research Institute	Bharuch	2020	Veer Narmad South Gujarat University	Private
Dr. M. K. Shah Medical College and Research Centre	Ahmedabad	2017	Gujarat University	Private
Dr. N. D. Desai Faculty of Medical Science and Research	Nadiad	2019	Dharamsinh Desai University	Private
GCS Medical College, Hospital and Research Centre	Ahmedabad	2011	Gujarat University	Private
GMERS Medical College and Hospital	Ahmedabad	2011	Gujarat University	Government of Gujarat
GMERS Medical College and Hospital	Dharpur–Patan	2012	Hemchandracharya North Gujarat University	Government of Gujarat
GMERS Medical College and Hospital	Gandhinagar	2012	Gujarat University	Government of Gujarat
GMERS Medical College and Hospital	Himmatnagar	2015	Hemchandracharya North Gujarat University	Government of Gujarat
GMERS Medical College and Hospital	Junagadh	2015	Bhakta Kavi Narsinh Mehta University	Government of Gujarat
GMERS Medical College and Hospital	Morbi	2022	Saurashtra University	Government of Gujarat
GMERS Medical College and Hospital	Panchmahal	2022	Shri Govind Guru University	Government of Gujarat
GMERS Medical College and Hospital	Porbandar	2022	Bhakta Kavi Narsinh Mehta University	Government of Gujarat
GMERS Medical College and Hospital	Rajpipla	2022	Veer Narmad South Gujarat University	Government of Gujarat
GMERS Medical College and Hospital	Vadodara	2011	Maharaja Sayajirao University of Baroda	Government of Gujarat
GMERS Medical College and Hospital	Vadnagar	2017	Hemchandracharya North Gujarat University	Government of Gujarat
GMERS Medical College and Hospital	Valsad	2012	Veer Narmad South Gujarat University	Government of Gujarat
Government Medical College	Bhavnagar	1995	Maharaja Krishnakumarsinhji Bhavnagar University	Government of Gujarat
Government Medical College	Surat	1964	Veer Narmad South Gujarat University	Government of Gujarat
Gujarat Adani Institute of Medical Sciences	Bhuj	2009	Krantiguru Shyamji Krishna Verma Kachchh University	Private
Kiran Medical College	Surat	2023	Veer Narmad South Gujarat University	Private
Matushri Prabhaben Khodabhai Boghara Medical College and Research Centre	Atkot	2024	Saurashtra University	Private
Medical College Baroda	Vadodara	1949	Maharaja Sayajirao University of Baroda	Government of Gujarat
M. P. Shah Medical College	Jamnagar	1949	Saurashtra University	Government of Gujarat
Narendra Modi Medical College	Ahmedabad	2009	Gujarat University	Amdavad Municipal Corporation
Nootan Medical College and Research Centre	Visnagar	2019	Sankalchand Patel University	Private
Pandit Deendayal Upadhyay Medical College	Rajkot	1995	Saurashtra University	Government of Gujarat
Parul Institute of Medical Science and Research	Vadodara	2016	Parul University	Private
Pramukh Swami Medical College	Karamsad	1987	Bhaikaka University	Private
SAL Institute of Medical Sciences	Ahmedabad	2023	Gujarat University	Private
Shantabaa Medical College	Amreli	2019	Saurashtra University	Private
Smt. B. K. Shah Medical Institute and Research Centre	Vadodara	2002	Sumandeep Vidyapeeth	Private
Smt. NHL Municipal Medical College	Ahmedabad	1963	Gujarat University	Amdavad Municipal Corporation
Surat Municipal Institute of Medical Education and Research	Surat	1999	Veer Narmad South Gujarat University	Surat Municipal Corporation
Swaminarayan Institute of Medical Sciences and Research	Kalol	2023	Swaminarayan University	Private
The Gujarat Cancer and Research Institute	Ahmedabad	1972	Gujarat University	Government of India and Government of Gujarat
Zydus Medical College and Hospital	Dahod	2018	Shri Govind Guru University	Private

== Haryana ==
Name	Location	Established	University	Funding/ownership
Adesh Medical College and Hospital	Kurukshetra	2017	Pandit Bhagwat Dayal Sharma University of Health Sciences	Private
Al-Falah School of Medical Sciences and Research Centre	Faridabad	2019	Al-Falah University	Private
All India Institute of Medical Sciences	Rewari	2026	Autonomous	Government of India
Amrita School of Medicine	Faridabad	2023	Amrita Vishwa Vidyapeetham	Private
Bhagat Phool Singh Government Medical College for Women	Sonipat	2012	Pandit Bhagwat Dayal Sharma University of Health Sciences	Government of Haryana
ESIC Medical College	Faridabad	2015	Pandit Bhagwat Dayal Sharma University of Health Sciences	Government of India
Faculty of Medicine and Health Sciences	Gurgaon	2010	Shree Guru Gobind Singh Tricentenary University	Private
Kalpana Chawla Government Medical College	Karnal	2017	Pandit Bhagwat Dayal Sharma University of Health Sciences	Government of Haryana
Maharaja Agrasen Medical College	Agroha	1988	Pandit Bhagwat Dayal Sharma University of Health Sciences	Private
Maharishi Chyawan Government Medical College and Rao Tula Ram Hospital	Narnaul	2025	Pandit Bhagwat Dayal Sharma University of Health Sciences	Government of Haryana
Maharishi Markandeshwar Institute of Medical Sciences and Research	Ambala	2003	Maharishi Markandeshwar University	Private
N. C. Medical College and Hospital	Panipat	2016	Pandit Bhagwat Dayal Sharma University of Health Sciences	Private
Pandit Bhagwat Dayal Sharma Post Graduate Institute of Medical Sciences	Rohtak	1960	Pandit Bhagwat Dayal Sharma University of Health Sciences	Government of Haryana
Pt. Neki Ram Sharma Government Medical College Hospital	Bhiwani	2024	Pandit Bhagwat Dayal Sharma University of Health Sciences	Government of Haryana
Shaheed Hasan Khan Mewati Government Medical College	Nuh	2012	Pandit Bhagwat Dayal Sharma University of Health Sciences	Government of Haryana
Shri Atal Bihari Vajpayee Government Medical College	Faridabad	2022	Pandit Bhagwat Dayal Sharma University of Health Sciences	Government of Haryana
World College of Medical Sciences and Research	Jhajjar	2016	Pandit Bhagwat Dayal Sharma University of Health Sciences	Private

== Himachal Pradesh ==
Name	Location	Established	University	Funding/ownership
All India Institute of Medical Sciences	Bilaspur	2020	Autonomous	Government of India
Dr. Radhakrishnan Government Medical College	Hamirpur	2018	Atal Medical and Research University	Government of Himachal Pradesh
Dr. Rajendra Prasad Government Medical College	Kangra	1996	Atal Medical and Research University	Government of Himachal Pradesh
Dr. Yashwant Singh Parmar Government Medical College	Nahan	2016	Atal Medical and Research University	Government of Himachal Pradesh
Indira Gandhi Medical College	Shimla	1966	Atal Medical and Research University	Government of Himachal Pradesh
Maharishi Markandeshwar Medical College and Hospital	Solan	2013	Maharishi Markandeshwar University	Private
Pt. Jawahar Lal Nehru Government Medical College and Hospital	Chamba	2017	Atal Medical and Research University	Government of Himachal Pradesh
Shri Lal Bahadur Shastri Government Medical College	Mandi	2009	Atal Medical and Research University	Government of Himachal Pradesh

== Jammu & Kashmir ==
Name	Location	Established	University	Funding/ownership
Acharya Shri Chander College of Medical Sciences	Jammu	1995	University of Jammu	Private
All India Institute of Medical Sciences	Vijaypur	2020	Autonomous	Government of India
Government Medical College	Anantnag	2019	University of Kashmir	Government of Jammu and Kashmir
Government Medical College	Baramulla	2019	University of Kashmir	Government of Jammu and Kashmir
Government Medical College	Doda	2020	University of Kashmir	Government of Jammu and Kashmir
Government Medical College	Handwara	2023	University of Kashmir	Government of Jammu and Kashmir
Government Medical College	Jammu	1972	University of Jammu	Government of Jammu and Kashmir
Government Medical College	Kathua	2019	University of Jammu	Government of Jammu and Kashmir
Government Medical College	Rajouri	2019	University of Jammu	Government of Jammu and Kashmir
Government Medical College	Srinagar	1959	University of Kashmir	Government of Jammu and Kashmir
Government Medical College	Udhampur	2023	University of Jammu	Government of Jammu and Kashmir
Sher-i-Kashmir Institute of Medical Sciences	Srinagar	1982	Autonomous	Government of Jammu and Kashmir
Shri Mata Vaishno Devi Institute of Medical Excellence	Katra	2025	Shri Mata Vaishno Devi University	Private

== Jharkhand ==
Name	Location	Established	University	Funding/ownership
All India Institute of Medical Sciences	Deoghar	2019	Autonomous	Government of India
Central Institute of Psychiatry	Ranchi	1918	Ranchi University	Government of India
Laxmi Chandravansi Medical College and Hospital	Palamu	2021	Ramchandra Chandravansi University	Private
Mahatma Gandhi Memorial Medical College	Jamshedpur	1961	Kolhan University	Government of Jharkhand
Manipal-Tata Medical College	Jamshedpur	2020	Manipal Academy of Higher Education	Private
Medini Rai Medical College and Hospital	Palamu	2019	Nilamber-Pitamber University	Government of Jharkhand
Netaji Subhas Medical College and Hospital	Jamshedpur	2024	Netaji Subhas University	Private
Phulo Jhano Medical College and Hospital	Dumka	2019	Sido Kanhu Murmu University	Government of Jharkhand
Rajendra Institute of Medical Sciences	Ranchi	1960	Ranchi University	Government of Jharkhand
Shaheed Nirmal Mahto Medical College	Dhanbad	1969	Binod Bihari Mahto Koyalanchal University	Government of Jharkhand
Sheikh Bhikhari Medical College	Hazaribagh	2019	Vinoba Bhave University	Government of Jharkhand

== Karnataka ==
Name	Location	Established	University	Funding/ownership
Adichunchanagiri Institute of Medical Science	Mandya	1986	Adichunchanagiri University	Private
A J Institute of Medical Science	Mangaluru	2002	Rajiv Gandhi University of Health Sciences	Private
Akash Institute of Medical Sciences and Research Centre	Devanahalli	2016	Rajiv Gandhi University of Health Sciences	Private
Al-Ameen Medical College	Vijayapura	1984	Rajiv Gandhi University of Health Sciences	Private
Ballari Medical College and Research Centre	Ballari	1961	Rajiv Gandhi University of Health Sciences	Government of Karnataka
Basaveswara Medical College and Hospital	Chitradurga	1999	Rajiv Gandhi University of Health Sciences	Private
Belagavi Institute of Medical Sciences	Belagavi	2005	Rajiv Gandhi University of Health Sciences	Government of Karnataka
Bengaluru Medical College and Research Institute	Bengaluru	1955	Rajiv Gandhi University of Health Sciences	Government of Karnataka
BGS Global Institute of Medical Sciences	Bengaluru	2012	Rajiv Gandhi University of Health Sciences	Private
BGS Medical College and Hospital	Bengaluru	2024	Adichunchanagiri University	Private
Bharat Ratna Dr. B. R. Ambedkar Medical College and Hospital	Bengaluru	1980	Rajiv Gandhi University of Health Sciences	Private
Bidar Institute of Medical Sciences	Bidar	2007	Rajiv Gandhi University of Health Sciences	Government of Karnataka
Chamrajanagar Institute of Medical Sciences	Chamrajanagar	2016	Rajiv Gandhi University of Health Sciences	Government of Karnataka
Chikkamagaluru Institute of Medical Sciences	Chikkamagaluru	2022	Rajiv Gandhi University of Health Sciences	Government of Karnataka
Chitradurga Medical College and Research Institute	Chitradurga	2023	Rajiv Gandhi University of Health Sciences	Government of Karnataka
Dharwad Institute of Mental Health and Neurosciences	Dharwad	1845	Rajiv Gandhi University of Health Sciences	Government of Karnataka
Dr. Chandramma Dayananda Sagar Institute of Medical Education and Research	Hubballi	2020	Dayananda Sagar University	Private
East Point College of Medical Sciences and Research Centre	Bengaluru	2017	Rajiv Gandhi University of Health Sciences	Private
ESIC Medical College	Bengaluru	2012	Rajiv Gandhi University of Health Sciences	Government of India
ESIC Medical College	Kalaburagi	2013	Rajiv Gandhi University of Health Sciences	Government of India
Father Muller Medical College	Mangaluru	1991	Rajiv Gandhi University of Health Sciences	Private
G. R. Medical College Hospital and Research Centre	Mangaluru	2021	Rajiv Gandhi University of Health Sciences	Private
Gulbarga Institute of Medical Sciences	Kalaburagi	2013	Rajiv Gandhi University of Health Sciences	Government of Karnataka
Hassan Institute of Medical Sciences	Hassan	2006	Rajiv Gandhi University of Health Sciences	Government of Karnataka
Haveri Institute of Medical Sciences	Haveri	2022	Rajiv Gandhi University of Health Sciences	Government of Karnataka
Indira Gandhi Institute of Child Health	Bengaluru	1991	Rajiv Gandhi University of Health Sciences	Government of Karnataka
Jawaharlal Nehru Medical College	Belagavi	1963	KLE University	Private
J. G. M. M. Medical College	Hubballi	2021	KLE University	Private
J. J. M. Medical College	Davangere	1965	Rajiv Gandhi University of Health Sciences	Private
J. S. S. Medical College	Mysuru	1984	J. S. S. Academy of Higher Education and Research	Private
Kanachur Institute of Medical Sciences	Mangaluru	2016	Rajiv Gandhi University of Health Sciences	Private
Karnataka Medical College and Research Institute	Hubballi	1957	Rajiv Gandhi University of Health Sciences	Government of Karnataka
Karwar Institute of Medical Sciences	Karwar	2016	Rajiv Gandhi University of Health Sciences	Government of Karnataka
Kasturba Medical College	Mangaluru	1955	Manipal Academy of Higher Education	Private
Kasturba Medical College	Manipal	1953	Manipal Academy of Higher Education	Private
Kempegowda Institute of Medical Sciences	Bengaluru	1980	Rajiv Gandhi University of Health Sciences	Private
Khaja Banda Nawaz Institute of Medical Sciences	Kalaburagi	2018	Khaja Bandanawaz University	Private
K. H. Patil Institute of Medical Sciences	Gadag	2013	Rajiv Gandhi University of Health Sciences	Government of Karnataka
Kidwai Memorial Institute of Oncology	Bengaluru	1973	Rajiv Gandhi University of Health Sciences	Government of Karnataka
Kodagu Institute of Medical Sciences	Madikeri	2016	Rajiv Gandhi University of Health Sciences	Government of Karnataka
Koppal Institute of Medical Sciences	Koppal	2013	Rajiv Gandhi University of Health Sciences	Government of Karnataka
K. S. Hegde Medical Academy	Mangaluru	1999	NITTE University	Private
K. V. G. Medical College and Hospital	Sullia	1999	Rajiv Gandhi University of Health Sciences	Private
Mahadevappa Rampure Medical College	Kalaburagi	1963	Rajiv Gandhi University of Health Sciences	Private
Mandya Institute of Medical Sciences	Mandya	2005	Rajiv Gandhi University of Health Sciences	Government of Karnataka
M. V. J. Medical College and Research Hospital	Bengaluru	1997	Rajiv Gandhi University of Health Sciences	Private
Mysore Medical College & Research Institute	Mysuru	1924	Rajiv Gandhi University of Health Sciences	Government of Karnataka
Nandi Medical College and Research Institute	Chikkaballapur	2021	Rajiv Gandhi University of Health Sciences	Government of Karnataka
National Institute of Mental Health and Neurosciences	Bengaluru	1847	Autonomous	Government of India
Navodaya Medical College	Raichur	2001	Rajiv Gandhi University of Health Sciences	Private
PES University Institute of Medical Sciences and Research	Bengaluru	2024	PES University	Private
Raichur Institute of Medical Sciences	Raichur	2007	Rajiv Gandhi University of Health Sciences	Government of Karnataka
Rajarajeswari Medical College and Hospital	Bengaluru	1992	Rajiv Gandhi University of Health Sciences	Private
Ramaiah Medical College	Bengaluru	1979	Rajiv Gandhi University of Health Sciences	Private
Sambharam Institute of Medical Sciences and Research	Kolar	2016	Rajiv Gandhi University of Health Sciences	Private
Sapthagiri Institute of Medical Sciences and Research Centre	Bengaluru	2011	Rajiv Gandhi University of Health Sciences	Private
Shivamogga Institute of Medical Sciences	Shivamogga	2005	Rajiv Gandhi University of Health Sciences	Government of Karnataka
Shri Dharmasthala Manjunatheshwara College of Medical Sciences and Hospital	Dharwad	2003	Shri Dharmasthala Manjunatheshwara University	Private
Shri Atal Bihari Vajpayee Medical College and Research Institution	Bengaluru	2019	Rajiv Gandhi University of Health Sciences	Government of Karnataka
Shri B. M. Patil Medical College	Vijayapura	1980	BLDE (Deemed to be University)	Private
Shridevi Institute of Medical Sciences and Research Hospital	Tumakuru	2013	Rajiv Gandhi University of Health Sciences	Private
Siddaganga Medical College and Research Institute	Tumakuru	2022	Rajiv Gandhi University of Health Sciences	Private
S. Nijalingappa Medical College and HSK Hospital & Research Centre	Bagalkot	2002	Rajiv Gandhi University of Health Sciences	Private
Sri Chanmundeshwari Medical College Hospital and Research Centre	Channapatna	2023	Rajiv Gandhi University of Health Sciences	Private
Sri Devaraj Urs Medical College	Kolar	1986	Sri Devaraj Urs Academy of Higher Education and Research	Private
Sri Madhusudan Sai Institute of Medical Sciences and Research	Chikkaballapur	2023	Sri Sathya Sai University	Private
Srinivas Institute of Medical Sciences and Research Centre	Mangaluru	2011	Rajiv Gandhi University of Health Sciences	Private
Sri Siddhartha Institute of Medical Sciences and Research Centre	Bengaluru	2019	Sri Siddhartha Academy of Higher Education	Private
Sri Siddhartha Medical College	Tumakuru	1988	Sri Siddhartha Academy of Higher Education	Private
S. R. Patil Medical College and Hospital	Bagalkot	2024	Rajiv Gandhi University of Health Sciences	Private
S. S. Institute of Medical Sciences	Davangere	2006	Rajiv Gandhi University of Health Sciences	Private
St. John's National Academy of Health Sciences	Bengaluru	1963	Rajiv Gandhi University of Health Sciences	Private
Subbaiah Institute of Medical Sciences	Shivamogga	2012	Rajiv Gandhi University of Health Sciences	Private
The Oxford Medical College, Hospital and Research Centre	Bengaluru	2012	Rajiv Gandhi University of Health Sciences	Private
Vydehi Institute of Medical Sciences and Research Centre	Bengaluru	2000	Rajiv Gandhi University of Health Sciences	Private
Yadgiri Institute of Medical Sciences	Yadgiri	2022	Rajiv Gandhi University of Health Sciences	Government of Karnataka
Yenepoya Medical College	Mangaluru	1999	Yenepoya University	Private

== Keralam ==
Name	Location	Established	University	Funding/ownership
Al-Azhar Medical College and Super Speciality Hospital	Thodupuzha	2014	Kerala University of Health Sciences	Private
Amala Institute of Medical Sciences	Thrissur	2002	Kerala University of Health Sciences	Private
Amrita Institute of Medical Sciences	Kochi	2000	Amrita Vishwa Vidyapeetham	Private
Azeezia Institute of Medical Science	Kollam	2008	Kerala University of Health Sciences	Private
Believers Church Medical College Hospital	Thiruvalla	2016	Kerala University of Health Sciences	Private
Dr. Moopen's Medical College	Wayanad	2013	Kerala University of Health Sciences	Private
Dr. Somervell Memorial CSI Medical College	Thiruvananthapuram	2001	Kerala University of Health Sciences	Private
Government Medical College	Ernakulam	1999	Kerala University of Health Sciences	Government of Kerala
Government Medical College	Idukki	2014	Kerala University of Health Sciences	Government of Kerala
Government Medical College	Kannur	1993	Kerala University of Health Sciences	Government of Kerala
Government Medical College	Kollam	2013	Kerala University of Health Sciences	Government of Kerala
Government Medical College	Konni	2022	Kerala University of Health Sciences	Government of Kerala
Government Medical College	Kottayam	1962	Kerala University of Health Sciences	Government of Kerala
Government Medical College	Kozhikode	1957	Kerala University of Health Sciences	Government of Kerala
Government Medical College	Manjeri	2013	Kerala University of Health Sciences	Government of Kerala
Government Medical College	Palakkad	2014	Kerala University of Health Sciences	Government of Kerala
Government Medical College	Thiruvananthapuram	1951	Kerala University of Health Sciences	Government of Kerala
Government Medical College	Thrissur	1981	Kerala University of Health Sciences	Government of Kerala
Government T. D. Medical College	Alappuzha	1963	Kerala University of Health Sciences	Government of Kerala
Jubilee Mission Medical College and Research Institute	Thrissur	2002	Kerala University of Health Sciences	Private
Kannur Medical College	Kannur	2006	Kerala University of Health Sciences	Private
Karuna Medical College	Palakkad	2006	Kerala University of Health Sciences	Private
K. Karunakaran Government Medical College	Thiruvananthapuram	2026	Kerala University of Health Sciences	Government of Kerala
KMCT Medical College	Kozhikode	2008	Kerala University of Health Sciences	Private
Malabar Medical College	Kozhikode	2010	Kerala University of Health Sciences	Private
Malankara Orthodox Syrian Church Medical College	Kolenchery	2001	Kerala University of Health Sciences	Private
MES Medical College	Malappuram	2004	Kerala University of Health Sciences	Private
Mount Zion Medical College	Adoor	2014	Kerala University of Health Sciences	Private
Muslim Educational Society Medical College	Perinthalmanna	2002	Kerala University of Health Sciences	Private
PK Das Institute of Medical Sciences	Palakkad	2014	Kerala University of Health Sciences	Private
Pushpagiri Institute of Medical Sciences and Research Centre	Thiruvalla	2002	Kerala University of Health Sciences	Private
Regional Cancer Centre	Thiruvananthapuram	1981	Kerala University of Health Sciences	Government of India and Government of Kerala
Sree Chitra Tirunal Institute for Medical Sciences and Technology	Thiruvananthapuram	1976	Autonomous	Government of India
Sree Gokulam Medical College Trust and Research Foundation	Thiruvananthapuram	2005	Kerala University of Health Sciences	Private
Sree Narayana Institute of Medical Sciences	Ernakulam	2009	Kerala University of Health Sciences	Private
SUT Academy of Medical Sciences	Thiruvananthapuram	2006	Kerala University of Health Sciences	Private
Travancore Medical College Hospital	Kollam	2009	Kerala University of Health Sciences	Private

== Madhya Pradesh ==
Name	Location	Established	University	Funding/ownership
All India Institute of Medical Sciences	Bhopal	2012	Autonomous	Government of India
Amaltas Institute of Medical Sciences	Dewas	2016	Madhya Pradesh Medical Science University	Private
Atal Bihari Vajpayee Government Medical College	Vidisha	2018	Madhya Pradesh Medical Science University	Government of Madhya Pradesh
Birsa Munda Government Medical College	Shahdol	2019	Madhya Pradesh Medical Science University	Government of Madhya Pradesh
Bundelkhand Medical College	Sagar	2009	Madhya Pradesh Medical Science University	Government of Madhya Pradesh
Chhindwara Institute of Medical College Sciences	Chhindwara	2019	Madhya Pradesh Medical Science University	Government of Madhya Pradesh
Chirayu Medical College and Hospital	Bhopal	2011	Madhya Pradesh Medical Science University	Private
Dr. Laxmi Narayan Pandey Government Medical College	Ratlam	2018	Madhya Pradesh Medical Science University	Government of Madhya Pradesh
ESIC Medical College and Hospital	Indore	2025	Madhya Pradesh Medical Science University	Government of India
Gajra Raja Medical College	Gwalior	1946	Madhya Pradesh Medical Science University and Jiwaji University	Government of Madhya Pradesh
Gandhi Medical College	Bhopal	1955	Madhya Pradesh Medical Science University	Government of Madhya Pradesh
Government Medical College	Datia	2018	Madhya Pradesh Medical Science University	Government of Madhya Pradesh
Government Medical College	Satna	2023	Madhya Pradesh Medical Science University	Government of Madhya Pradesh
Government Medical College	Seoni	2024	Madhya Pradesh Medical Science University	Government of Madhya Pradesh
Index Medical College, Hospital and Research Center	Indore	2007	Malwanchal University	Private
L. N. Medical College and Research Center	Bhopal	2009	LNCT University	Private
LNCT Medical College and Sewakunj Hospital	Indore	2021	Madhya Pradesh Medical Science University	Private
Mahatma Gandhi Memorial Medical College	Indore	1948	Madhya Pradesh Medical Science University	Government of Madhya Pradesh
Mahaveer Institute of Medical Sciences and Research	Bhopal	2020	Madhya Pradesh Medical Science University	Private
Nandkumar Singh Chauhan Government Medical College	Khandwa	2018	Madhya Pradesh Medical Science University	Government of Madhya Pradesh
Netaji Subhash Chandra Bose Medical College	Jabalpur	1955	Madhya Pradesh Medical Science University	Government of Madhya Pradesh
People's College of Medical Sciences and Research Center	Bhopal	2005	People's University	Private
Ram Krishna Medical College Hospital and Research Centre	Bhopal	2023	Madhya Pradesh Medical Science University	Private
RKDF Medical College Hospital and Research Center	Bhopal	2014	Sarvepalli Radhakrishnan University	Private
Ruxmaniben Deepchand Gardi Medical College	Ujjain	2001	Madhya Pradesh Medical Science University	Private
Shrimant Rajmata Vijayaraje Scindia Medical College	Shivpuri	2019	Madhya Pradesh Medical Science University	Government of Madhya Pradesh
Shyam Shah Medical College	Rewa	1963	Madhya Pradesh Medical Science University	Government of Madhya Pradesh
Sri Aurobindo Institute of Medical Sciences	Indore	2003	Sri Aurobindo University	Private
Sukh Sagar Medical College and Hospital	Jabalpur	2021	Madhya Pradesh Medical Science University	Private
Sunderlal Patwa Government Medical College	Mandsaur	2024	Madhya Pradesh Medical Science University	Government of Madhya Pradesh
Virendra Kumar Sakhlecha Government Medical College	Neemuch	2024	Madhya Pradesh Medical Science University	Government of Madhya Pradesh

== Maharashtra ==
Name	Location	Established	University	Funding/ownership
ACPM Medical College	Dhule	1990	Maharashtra University of Health Sciences	Private
All India Institute of Medical Sciences	Nagpur	2018	Autonomous	Government of India
Armed Forces Medical College	Pune	1962	Maharashtra University of Health Sciences	Government of India
Ashwini Rural Medical College, Hospital and Research Centre	Solapur	2012	Maharashtra University of Health Sciences	Private
Bharati Vidyapeeth Deemed University Medical College and Hospital	Sangli	2005	Bharati Vidyapeeth	Private
Bharati Vidyapeeth University Medical College	Pune	1989	Bharati Vidyapeeth	Private
Bharatratna Atal Bihari Vajpayee Medical College	Pune	2022	Maharashtra University of Health Sciences	Pune Municipal Corporation
B. J. Government Medical College	Pune	1964	Maharashtra University of Health Sciences	Government of Maharashtra
B. K. L. Walawalkar Rural Medical College	Ratnagiri	2015	Maharashtra University of Health Sciences	Private
Datta Meghe Medical College	Nagpur	2020	Datta Meghe Institute of Medical Sciences	Private
Dr. Balasaheb Vikhe Patil Rural Medical College	Loni	1984	Pravara Institute of Medical Sciences	Private
Dr. D. Y. Patil Medical College	Kolhapur	1989	D. Y. Patil Education Society	Private
Dr. D. Y. Patil Medical College, Hospital and Research Centre	Pune	1995	Dr. D. Y. Patil Vidyapeeth	Private
Dr. D. Y. Patil School of Medicine	Navi Mumbai	1989	Dr. D. Y. Patil University	Private
Dr. N. Y. Tasgaonkar Institute of Medical Science	Karjat	2021	Maharashtra University of Health Sciences	Private
Dr. Panjabrao Deshmukh Memorial Medical College	Amravati	1984	Maharashtra University of Health Sciences	Private
Dr. Rajendra Gode Medical College	Amravati	2023	Maharashtra University of Health Sciences	Private
Dr. Shankarrao Chavan Government Medical College	Nanded	1988	Maharashtra University of Health Sciences	Government of Maharashtra
Dr. Ulhas Patil Medical College and Hospital	Jalgaon	2008	Maharashtra University of Health Sciences	Private
Dr. V. M. Government Medical College	Solapur	1963	Maharashtra University of Health Sciences	Government of Maharashtra
Dr. Vasantrao Pawar Medical College Hospital and Research Center	Nashik	1990	Maharashtra University of Health Sciences	Private
Dr. Vithalrao Vikhe Patil Foundations Medical College and Hospital	Ahmednagar	2003	Maharashtra University of Health Sciences	Private
Government Medical College	Akola	2002	Maharashtra University of Health Sciences	Government of Maharashtra
Government Medical College	Alibag	2022	Maharashtra University of Health Sciences	Government of Maharashtra
Government Medical College	Chhatrapati Sambhaji Nagar	1956	Maharashtra University of Health Sciences	Government of Maharashtra
Government Medical College	Gondia	2016	Maharashtra University of Health Sciences	Government of Maharashtra
Government Medical College	Jalgaon	2018	Maharashtra University of Health Sciences	Government of Maharashtra
Government Medical College	Miraj	1962	Maharashtra University of Health Sciences	Government of Maharashtra
Government Medical College	Nagpur	1947	Maharashtra University of Health Sciences	Government of Maharashtra
Government Medical College	Nandurbar	2020	Maharashtra University of Health Sciences	Government of Maharashtra
Government Medical College	Satara	2021	Maharashtra University of Health Sciences	Government of Maharashtra
Government Medical College	Sindhudurg	2021	Maharashtra University of Health Sciences	Government of Maharashtra
Grant Government Medical College and Sir J. J. Group of Hospitals	Mumbai	1845	Maharashtra University of Health Sciences	Government of Maharashtra
H. B. T. Medical College and Dr. R. N. Cooper Municipal General Hospital	Mumbai	2015	Maharashtra University of Health Sciences	Brihanmumbai Municipal Corporation
Indian Institute of Medical Science and Research	Jalna	2013	Maharashtra University of Health Sciences	Private
Indira Gandhi Government Medical College	Nagpur	1968	Maharashtra University of Health Sciences	Government of Maharashtra
Jawaharlal Nehru Medical College	Wardha	1990	Datta Meghe Institute of Medical Sciences	Private
Karmavir Dadasaheb Kannamwar Government Medical College	Chandrapur	2015	Maharashtra University of Health Sciences	Government of Maharashtra
K. J. Somaiya Medical College and Research Centre	Mumbai	1991	Maharashtra University of Health Sciences	Private
Krishna Institute of Medical Sciences	Karad	1984	Krishna Vishwa Vidyapeeth	Private
Lokmanya Tilak Municipal Medical College and General Hospital	Mumbai	1964	Maharashtra University of Health Sciences	Brihanmumbai Municipal Corporation
Maharashtra Institute of Medical Education and Research	Pune	1995	Maharashtra University of Health Sciences	Private
Maharashtra Institute of Medical Science and Research	Latur	1989	Maharashtra University of Health Sciences	Private
Mahatma Gandhi Institute of Medical Sciences	Sevagram	1969	Maharashtra University of Health Sciences	Government of India and Government of Maharashtra
MGM Medical College and Hospital	Chhatrapati Sambhaji Nagar	1989	MGM Institute of Health Sciences	Private
MGM Medical College and Hospital	Navi Mumbai	1989	MGM Institute of Health Sciences	Private
N. K. P. Salve Institute of Medical Sciences and Research Centre	Nagpur	1990	Maharashtra University of Health Sciences	Private
Post Graduate Institute and Yashwantrao Chavan Memorial Hospital	Pimpri-Chinchwad	2013	Maharashtra University of Health Sciences	Pimpri-Chinchwad Municipal Corporation
Prakash Institute of Medical Sciences	Sangli	2016	Maharashtra University of Health Sciences	Private
Punyashlok Ahilyadevi Holkar Government Medical College and General Hospital	Baramati	2019	Maharashtra University of Health Sciences	Government of Maharashtra
R. C. S. M Government Medical College and C. P. R. Hospital	Kolhapur	2000	Maharashtra University of Health Sciences	Government of Maharashtra
Rajiv Gandhi Medical College and Chhatrapati Shivaji Maharaj Hospital	Thane	1992	Maharashtra University of Health Sciences	Thane Municipal Corporation
Seth G.S. Medical College and King Edward Memorial Hospital	Mumbai	1926	Maharashtra University of Health Sciences	Brihanmumbai Municipal Corporation
Shri Bhausaheb Hire Government Medical College	Dhule	1988	Maharashtra University of Health Sciences	Government of Maharashtra
Shri Vasantrao Naik Government Medical College	Yavatmal	1989	Maharashtra University of Health Sciences	Government of Maharashtra
SMBT Institute of Medical Sciences and Research Centre	Nashik	2014	Maharashtra University of Health Sciences	Private
Smt. Kashibai Navale Medical College and General Hospital	Pune	2007	Maharashtra University of Health Sciences	Private
SSPM Medical College and Lifetime Hospital	Sindhudurg	2017	Maharashtra University of Health Sciences	Private
Swami Ramanand Teerth Rural Medical College	Ambajogai	1974	Maharashtra University of Health Sciences	Government of Maharashtra
Symbiosis Medical College for Women	Pune	2020	Symbiosis International University	Private
Terna Medical College	Navi Mumbai	1991	Maharashtra University of Health Sciences	Private
Topiwala National Medical College and B. Y. L. Nair Charitable Hospital	Mumbai	1921	Maharashtra University of Health Sciences	Brihanmumbai Municipal Corporation
Vedantaa Institute of Medical Sciences	Palghar	2017	Maharashtra University of Health Sciences	Private
Vilasrao Desmukh Government Medical College	Latur	2000	Maharashtra University of Health Sciences	Government of Maharashtra

== Manipur ==
Name	Location	Established	University	Funding/ownership
Churachandpur Medical College	Churachandpur	2022	Manipur University	Government of Manipur
Jawaharlal Nehru Institute of Medical Sciences	Imphal East	1989	Manipur University	Government of Manipur
Regional Institute of Medical Sciences	Imphal West	1972	Manipur University	Government of India
Shija Academy of Health Sciences	Imphal West	2021	Manipur University	Private

== Meghalaya ==
Name	Location	Established	University	Funding/ownership
North Eastern Indira Gandhi Regional Institute of Health and Medical Sciences	Shillong	2008	North Eastern Hill University	Government of India
P. A. Sangma International Medical College and Hospital	Ri-Bhoi	2024	University of Science and Technology	Private
Shillong Medical College	Shillong	2025	North Eastern Hill University	Government of Meghalaya

== Mizoram ==
Name	Location	Established	University	Funding/ownership
Zoram Medical College	Falkawn	2018	Mizoram University	Government of Mizoram

== Nagaland ==
Name	Location	Established	University	Funding/ownership
Nagaland Institute of Medical Science and Research	Kohima	2022	Nagaland University	Government of Nagaland

== Odisha ==
Name	Location	Established	University	Funding/ownership
Acharya Harihar Post Graduate Institute of Cancer	Cuttack	1981	Odisha University of Health Sciences	Government of Odisha
All India Institute of Medical Sciences	Bhubaneswar	2012	Autonomous	Government of India
Bhima Bhoi Medical College and Hospital	Balangir	2018	Odisha University of Health Sciences	Government of Odisha
Dharanidhar Medical College and Hospital	Keonjhar	2022	Odisha University of Health Sciences	Government of Odisha
DRIEMS Institute of Health Sciences and Hospital	Tangi	2023	DRIEMS University	Private
Fakir Mohan Medical College and Hospital	Balasore	2017	Odisha University of Health Sciences	Government of Odisha
Government Medical College and Hospital	Phulbani	2025	Odisha University of Health Sciences	Government of Odisha
Government Medical College and Hospital	Sundargarh	2022	Odisha University of Health Sciences	Government of Odisha
Hi-Tech Medical College and Hospital	Bhubaneswar	2005	Odisha University of Health Sciences	Private
Hi-Tech Medical College and Hospital	Rourkela	2012	Odisha University of Health Sciences	Private
Institute of Medical Sciences and Sum Hospital	Bhubaneswar	2007	Siksha 'O' Anusandhan	Private
Ispat Post Graduate Institute and Super Specialty Hospital	Rourkela	2021	Odisha University of Health Sciences	Private
Kalinga Institute of Medical Sciences	Bhubaneswar	2007	Kalinga Institute of Industrial Technology	Private
Maharaja Jajati Keshri Medical College and Hospital	Jajpur	2024	Odisha University of Health Sciences	Government of Odisha
Maharaja Krushna Chandra Gajapati Medical College and Hospital	Brahmapur	1962	Odisha University of Health Sciences	Government of Odisha
Pabitra Mohan Pradhan Medical College and Hospital	Talcher	2021	Odisha University of Health Sciences	Government of Odisha
Pandit Raghunath Murmu Medical College and Hospital	Baripada	2017	Odisha University of Health Sciences	Government of Odisha
PGIMER and Capital Hospital	Bhubaneswar	1954	Odisha University of Health Sciences	Government of Odisha
Saheed Laxman Nayak Medical College and Hospital	Koraput	2017	Odisha University of Health Sciences	Government of Odisha
Saheed Rendo Majhi Medical College and Hospital	Bhawanipatna	2023	Odisha University of Health Sciences	Government of Odisha
Shri Jagannath Medical College and Hospital	Puri	2021	Odisha University of Health Sciences	Government of Odisha
Srirama Chandra Bhanja Medical College and Hospital	Cuttack	1944	Odisha University of Health Sciences	Government of Odisha
Veer Surendra Sai Institute of Medical Sciences and Research	Burla	1959	Odisha University of Health Sciences	Government of Odisha

== Puducherry ==
Name	Location	Established	University	Funding/ownership
Aarupadai Veedu Medical College	Puducherry	1999	Vinayaka Mission's Research Foundation	Private
Indira Gandhi Medical College and Research Institute	Puducherry	2010	Pondicherry University	Government of Puducherry
Jawaharlal Institute of Postgraduate Medical Education and Research	Puducherry	1823	Autonomous	Government of India
Mahatma Gandhi Medical College and Research Institute	Puducherry	2002	Sri Balaji Vidyapeeth	Private
Pondicherry Institute of Medical Sciences	Puducherry	2000	Pondicherry University	Private
Sri Lakshmi Narayana Institute of Medical Sciences	Puducherry	2006	Bharath Institute of Higher Education and Research	Private
Sri Manakula Vinayagar Medical College and Hospital	Puducherry	2006	Pondicherry University	Private
Sri Venkateshwaraa Medical College Hospital and Research Centre	Puducherry	2007	Pondicherry University	Private
Vinayaka Missions Medical College	Karaikal	1997	Vinayaka Mission's Research Foundation	Private

== Punjab ==
Name	Location	Established	University	Funding/ownership
Adesh Institute of Medical Sciences & Research	Bathinda	2006	Adesh University	Private
All India Institute of Medical Sciences	Bathinda	2019	Autonomous	Government of India
Christian Medical College	Ludhiana	1894	Baba Farid University of Health Sciences	Private
Dayanand Medical College and Hospital	Ludhiana	1963	Baba Farid University of Health Sciences	Private
Dr. B.R. Ambedkar State Institute of Medical Sciences	Mohali	2021	Baba Farid University of Health Sciences	Government of Punjab
ESIC Medical College and Hospital	Ludhiana	2024	Baba Farid University of Health Sciences	Government of India
Gian Sagar Medical College and Hospital	Patiala	2020	Baba Farid University of Health Sciences	Private
Government Medical College	Amritsar	1864	Baba Farid University of Health Sciences	Government of Punjab
Government Medical College	Patiala	1953	Baba Farid University of Health Sciences	Government of Punjab
Guru Gobind Singh Medical College	Faridkot	1973	Baba Farid University of Health Sciences	Government of Punjab
Punjab Institute of Medical Sciences	Jalandhar	1999	Baba Farid University of Health Sciences	Private (PPP Model)
Sri Guru Ram Das Institute of Medical Sciences and Research	Amritsar	1997	Sri Guru Ram Das University of Health Sciences	Private

== Rajasthan ==
Name	Location	Established	University	Funding/ownership
All India Institute of Medical Sciences	Jodhpur	2012	Autonomous	Government of India
American International Institute of Medical Sciences	Udaipur	2016	Rajasthan University of Health Sciences	Private
Ananta Institute of Medical Sciences and Research Centre	Rajsamand	2016	Rajasthan University of Health Sciences	Private
Dr. B. S. Tomar Institute of Medical Sciences and Research	Jaipur	2025	Rajasthan University of Health Sciences	Private
Dr. Sampurnanand Medical College	Jodhpur	1965	Rajasthan University of Health Sciences	Government of Rajasthan
Dr. S. S. Tantia Medical College Hospital and Research Centre	Sri Ganganagar	2021	Tantia University	Private
ESIC Medical College	Alwar	2021	Rajasthan University of Health Sciences	Government of India
Geetanjali Medical College	Udaipur	2008	Geetanjali University	Private
Government Medical College	Baran	2024	Rajasthan University of Health Sciences	Government of Rajasthan
Government Medical College	Barmer	2019	Rajasthan University of Health Sciences	Government of Rajasthan
Government Medical College	Dungarpur	2018	Rajasthan University of Health Sciences	Government of Rajasthan
Government Medical College	Hanumangarh	2023	Rajasthan University of Health Sciences	Government of Rajasthan
Government Medical College	Jaisalmer	2025	Rajasthan University of Health Sciences	Government of Rajasthan
Government Medical College	Kota	1992	Rajasthan University of Health Sciences	Government of Rajasthan
Government Medical College	Pali	2018	Rajasthan University of Health Sciences	Government of Rajasthan
Government Medical College	Sawai Madhopur	2024	Rajasthan University of Health Sciences	Government of Rajasthan
Government Medical College	Sri Ganganagar	2022	Rajasthan University of Health Sciences	Government of Rajasthan
Jaipur National University Institute of Medical Sciences and Research Centre	Jaipur	2016	Jaipur National University	Private
Jawaharlal Nehru Medical College	Ajmer	1965	Rajasthan University of Health Sciences	Government of Rajasthan
Jhalawar Medical College	Jhalawar	2008	Rajasthan University of Health Sciences	Government of Rajasthan
JIET Medical College and Hospital	Jodhpur	2024	Rajasthan University of Health Sciences	Private
Mahatma Gandhi Medical College and Hospital	Jaipur	2001	Mahatma Gandhi University of Medical Sciences & Technology	Private
National Institute of Medical Science and Research	Jaipur	2004	NIMS University	Private
Pacific Institute of Medical Sciences	Udaipur	2015	Sai Tirupati University	Private
Pacific Medical College and Hospital	Udaipur	2014	Pacific Medical University	Private
Pandit Deendayal Upadhyaya Medical College	Churu	2018	Rajasthan University of Health Sciences	Government of Rajasthan
Prince Medical College and Hospital	Sikar	2026	Rajasthan University of Health Sciences	Private
Rabindranath Tagore Medical College	Udaipur	1961	Rajasthan University of Health Sciences	Government of Rajasthan
Rajmata Vijaya Raje Scindia Medical College	Bhilwara	2018	Rajasthan University of Health Sciences	Government of Rajasthan
RUHS College of Medical Sciences	Jaipur	2014	Rajasthan University of Health Sciences	Government of Rajasthan
Sardar Patel Medical College	Bikaner	1959	Rajasthan University of Health Sciences	Government of Rajasthan
Sawai Man Singh Medical College	Jaipur	1947	Rajasthan University of Health Sciences	Government of Rajasthan
Shree Jagannath Pahadia Medical College	Bharatpur	2018	Rajasthan University of Health Sciences	Government of Rajasthan
Shri Kalyan Government Medical College	Sikar	2020	Rajasthan University of Health Sciences	Government of Rajasthan
Sudha Medical College and Hospital	Kota	2024	Rajasthan University of Health Sciences	Private

== Sikkim ==
Name	Location	Established	University	Funding/ownership
Sikkim Manipal Institute of Medical Sciences	Gangtok	2000	Sikkim Manipal University	Private

== Tamil Nadu ==
Name	Location	Established	University	Funding/ownership
ACS Medical College and Hospital	Chennai	2007	Dr. M. G. R. Educational and Research Institute	Private
All India Institute of Medical Sciences	Madurai	2021	Autonomous	Government of India
Annapoorna Medical College and Hospital	Salem	2011	Tamil Nadu Dr. M. G. R. Medical University	Private
Bhaarath Medical College and Hospital	Chennai	2020	Bharath Institute of Higher Education and Research	Private
Chengalpattu Medical College	Chengalpattu	1965	Tamil Nadu Dr. M. G. R. Medical University	Government of Tamil Nadu
Chettinad Hospital and Research Institute	Kelambakkam	2005	Chettinad Academy of Research and Education	Private
Christian Medical College	Vellore	1900	Tamil Nadu Dr. M. G. R. Medical University	Private
Coimbatore Medical College	Coimbatore	1966	Tamil Nadu Dr. M. G. R. Medical University	Government of Tamil Nadu
Dhanalakshmi Srinivasan Medical College and Hospital	Perambalur	2011	Tamil Nadu Dr. M. G. R. Medical University	Private
ESIC Medical College and PGIMSR	Chennai	2011	Tamil Nadu Dr. M. G. R. Medical University	Government of India
Government Ariyalur Medical College and Hospital	Ariyalur	2009	Tamil Nadu Dr. M. G. R. Medical University	Government of Tamil Nadu
Government Cuddalore Medical College and Hospital	Cuddalore	1985	Tamil Nadu Dr. M. G. R. Medical University	Government of Tamil Nadu
Government Dharmapuri Medical College	Dharmapuri	2008	Tamil Nadu Dr. M. G. R. Medical University	Government of Tamil Nadu
Government Dindigul Medical College and Hospital	Dindigul	2021	Tamil Nadu Dr. M. G. R. Medical University	Government of Tamil Nadu
Government Erode Medical College	Erode	1992	Tamil Nadu Dr. M. G. R. Medical University	Government of Tamil Nadu
Government Kallakurichi Medical College and Hospital	Kallakurichi	2009	Tamil Nadu Dr. M. G. R. Medical University	Government of Tamil Nadu
Government Karur Medical College	Karur	2019	Tamil Nadu Dr. M. G. R. Medical University	Government of Tamil Nadu
Government Kilpauk Medical College	Chetput	1960	Tamil Nadu Dr. M. G. R. Medical University	Government of Tamil Nadu
Government Krishnagiri Medical College and Hospital	Krishnagiri	2008	Tamil Nadu Dr. M. G. R. Medical University	Government of Tamil Nadu
Government Medical College and ESIC Hospital	Coimbatore	2016	Tamil Nadu Dr. M. G. R. Medical University	Government of Tamil Nadu
Government Medical College and Hospital	Triplicane	2015	Tamil Nadu Dr. M. G. R. Medical University	Government of Tamil Nadu
Government Mohan Kumaramangalam Medical College	Salem	1986	Tamil Nadu Dr. M. G. R. Medical University	Government of Tamil Nadu
Government Nagapattinam Medical College and Hospital	Nagapattinam	2008	Tamil Nadu Dr. M. G. R. Medical University	Government of Tamil Nadu
Government Namakkal Medical College and Hospital	Namakkal	2008	Tamil Nadu Dr. M. G. R. Medical University	Government of Tamil Nadu
Government Pudukkottai Medical College and Hospital	Pudukkottai	2017	Tamil Nadu Dr. M. G. R. Medical University	Government of Tamil Nadu
Government Ramanathapuram Medical College and Hospital	Ramanathapuram	2008	Tamil Nadu Dr. M. G. R. Medical University	Government of Tamil Nadu
Government Sivagangai Medical College and Hospital	Sivagangai	2012	Tamil Nadu Dr. M. G. R. Medical University	Government of Tamil Nadu
Government Thiruvarur Medical College and Hospital	Thiruvarur	2010	Tamil Nadu Dr. M. G. R. Medical University	Government of Tamil Nadu
Government Tiruppur Medical College and Hospital	Tiruppur	2008	Tamil Nadu Dr. M. G. R. Medical University	Government of Tamil Nadu
Government Tiruvallur Medical College and Hospital	Tiruvallur	2009	Tamil Nadu Dr. M. G. R. Medical University	Government of Tamil Nadu
Government Tiruvannamalai Medical College and Hospital	Tiruvannamalai	2012	Tamil Nadu Dr. M. G. R. Medical University	Government of Tamil Nadu
Government Vellore Medical College	Vellore	2005	Tamil Nadu Dr. M. G. R. Medical University	Government of Tamil Nadu
Government Villupuram Medical College	Villupuram	2010	Tamil Nadu Dr. M. G. R. Medical University	Government of Tamil Nadu
Government Virudhunagar Medical College and Hospital	Virudhunagar	2008	Tamil Nadu Dr. M. G. R. Medical University	Government of Tamil Nadu
K.A.P. Viswanatham Government Medical College	Trichy	1997	Tamil Nadu Dr. M. G. R. Medical University	Government of Tamil Nadu
Kanyakumari Government Medical College	Kanyakumari	2001	Tamil Nadu Dr. M. G. R. Medical University	Government of Tamil Nadu
Karpaga Vinayaga Institute of Medical Sciences and Research Centre	Chengalpattu	2009	Tamil Nadu Dr. M. G. R. Medical University	Private
Karpagam Faculty of Medical Sciences and Research	Coimbatore	2012	Tamil Nadu Dr. M. G. R. Medical University	Private
KMCH Institute of Health Sciences and Research	Coimbatore	2019	Tamil Nadu Dr. M. G. R. Medical University	Private
Madha Medical College and Hospital	Chennai	2011	Tamil Nadu Dr. M. G. R. Medical University	Private
Madras Medical College	Chennai	1835	Tamil Nadu Dr. M. G. R. Medical University	Government of Tamil Nadu
Madurai Medical College	Madurai	1954	Tamil Nadu Dr. M. G. R. Medical University	Government of Tamil Nadu
Meenakshi Medical College and Research Institute	Kanchipuram	2003	Meenakshi Academy of Higher Education and Research	Private
Melmaruvathur Adiparasakthi Institute of Medical Sciences and Research	Kanchipuram	2008	Tamil Nadu Dr. M. G. R. Medical University	Private
Panimalar Medical College Hospital and Research Institute	Chennai	2020	Tamil Nadu Dr. M. G. R. Medical University	Private
PSG Institute of Medical Sciences & Research	Coimbatore	1985	Tamil Nadu Dr. M. G. R. Medical University	Private
Saveetha Medical College	Thandalam	2005	Saveetha Institute of Medical And Technical Sciences	Private
Shri Sathya Sai Medical College	Nellikuppam	2008	Sri Balaji Vidyapeeth	Private
Sree Balaji Medical College and Hospital	Chennai	2004	Bharath Institute of Higher Education and Research	Private
Sree Mookambika Institute of Medical Sciences	Kanyakumari	2006	Tamil Nadu Dr. M. G. R. Medical University	Private
Sri Muthukumaran Medical College	Chennai	2009	Tamil Nadu Dr. M. G. R. Medical University	Private
Sri Ramachandra Medical College and Research Institute	Chennai	1985	Sri Ramachandra Institute of Higher Education and Research	Private
SRM Medical College Hospital and Research Centre	Chennai	1985	SRM Institute of Science and Technology	Private
Stanley Medical College	Chennai	1938	Tamil Nadu Dr. M. G. R. Medical University	Government of Tamil Nadu
Tagore Medical College and Hospital	Chennai	2010	Tamil Nadu Dr. M. G. R. Medical University	Private
Thanjavur Medical College	Thanjavur	1958	Tamil Nadu Dr. M. G. R. Medical University	Government of Tamil Nadu
Theni Medical College	Theni	2004	Tamil Nadu Dr. M. G. R. Medical University	Government of Tamil Nadu
The Nilgiris Government Medical College and Hospital	Ooty	2008	Tamil Nadu Dr. M. G. R. Medical University	Government of Tamil Nadu
Thoothukudi Medical College	Thoothukudi	2001	Tamil Nadu Dr. M. G. R. Medical University	Government of Tamil Nadu
Tirunelveli Medical College	Tirunelveli	1965	Tamil Nadu Dr. M. G. R. Medical University	Government of Tamil Nadu
Trichy SRM Medical College Hospital and Research Centre	Tiruchirapalli	2008	Tamil Nadu Dr. M. G. R. Medical University	Private
Velammal Medical College Hospital and Research Institute	Madurai	2012	Tamil Nadu Dr. M. G. R. Medical University	Private
Vels Medical College and Hospital	Tiruvallur	2021	Vels Institute of Science, Technology & Advanced Studies	Private
Vinayaka Mission's Kirupananda Variyar Medical College & Hospital	Salem	1995	Vinayaka Mission's Research Foundation	Private

== Telangana ==
Name	Location	Established	University	Funding/ownership
All India Institute of Medical Sciences	Bibinagar	2019	Autonomous	Government of India
Arundathi Institute of Medical Sciences	Malkajgiri	2023	Kaloji Narayana Rao University of Health Sciences	Private
Ayaan Institute of Medical Sciences	Hyderabad	2018	Kaloji Narayana Rao University of Health Sciences	Private
Bhaskar Medical College and General Hospital	Moinabad	2005	Kaloji Narayana Rao University of Health Sciences	Private
Chalmeda Ananda Rao Institute of Medical Sciences	Karimnagar	2003	Kaloji Narayana Rao University of Health Sciences	Private
Deccan College of Medical Sciences	Hyderabad	1984	Kaloji Narayana Rao University of Health Sciences	Private
Dr. VRK Women's Medical College	Hyderabad	2010	Kaloji Narayana Rao University of Health Sciences	Private
ESIC Medical College	Hyderabad	2016	Kaloji Narayana Rao University of Health Sciences	Government of India
Father Colombo Institute of Medical Sciences	Warangal	2023	Kaloji Narayana Rao University of Health Sciences	Private
Gandhi Medical College and Hospital	Secunderabad	1954	Kaloji Narayana Rao University of Health Sciences	Government of Telangana
Government Medical College	Asifabad	2023	Kaloji Narayana Rao University of Health Sciences	Government of Telangana
Government Medical College	Bhadradri Kothagudem	2021	Kaloji Narayana Rao University of Health Sciences	Government of Telangana
Government Medical College	Jagtial	2022	Kaloji Narayana Rao University of Health Sciences	Government of Telangana
Government Medical College	Jangaon	2023	Kaloji Narayana Rao University of Health Sciences	Government of Telangana
Government Medical College	Jayashankar Bhupalpally	2023	Kaloji Narayana Rao University of Health Sciences	Government of Telangana
Government Medical College	Karimnagar	2023	Kaloji Narayana Rao University of Health Sciences	Government of Telangana
Government Medical College	Mahabubabad	2022	Kaloji Narayana Rao University of Health Sciences	Government of Telangana
Government Medical College	Mahbubnagar	2016	Kaloji Narayana Rao University of Health Sciences	Government of Telangana
Government Medical College	Maheshwaram	2024	Kaloji Narayana Rao University of Health Sciences	Government of Telangana
Government Medical College	Mancherial	2022	Kaloji Narayana Rao University of Health Sciences	Government of Telangana
Government Medical College	Medak	2023	Kaloji Narayana Rao University of Health Sciences	Government of Telangana
Government Medical College	Nalgonda	2019	Kaloji Narayana Rao University of Health Sciences	Government of Telangana
Government Medical College	Nirmal	2023	Kaloji Narayana Rao University of Health Sciences	Government of Telangana
Government Medical College	Nizamabad	2013	Kaloji Narayana Rao University of Health Sciences	Government of Telangana
Government Medical College	Rajanna Sircilla	2023	Kaloji Narayana Rao University of Health Sciences	Government of Telangana
Government Medical College	Ramagundam	2022	Kaloji Narayana Rao University of Health Sciences	Government of Telangana
Government Medical College	Sangareddy	2022	Kaloji Narayana Rao University of Health Sciences	Government of Telangana
Government Medical College	Siddipet	2018	Kaloji Narayana Rao University of Health Sciences	Government of Telangana
Government Medical College	Suryapet	2019	Kaloji Narayana Rao University of Health Sciences	Government of Telangana
Government Medical College	Quthbullapur	2024	Kaloji Narayana Rao University of Health Sciences	Government of Telangana
Government Medical College	Vikarabad	2023	Kaloji Narayana Rao University of Health Sciences	Government of Telangana
Government Medical College	Wanaparthy	2022	Kaloji Narayana Rao University of Health Sciences	Government of Telangana
Government Medical College	Yadadri Bhuvanagiri	2024	Kaloji Narayana Rao University of Health Sciences	Government of Telangana
Kakatiya Medical College	Warangal	1959	Kaloji Narayana Rao University of Health Sciences	Government of Telangana
Kamineni Institute of Medical Sciences	Narketpally	1999	Kaloji Narayana Rao University of Health Sciences	Private
Maheshwara Medical College and Hospital	Hyderabad	2016	Kaloji Narayana Rao University of Health Sciences	Private
Malla Reddy Institute of Medical Sciences	Hyderabad	2012	Kaloji Narayana Rao University of Health Sciences	Private
Malla Reddy Medical College For Women	Hyderabad	2013	Kaloji Narayana Rao University of Health Sciences	Private
Mamata Academy of Medical Sciences	Bachupally	2019	Kaloji Narayana Rao University of Health Sciences	Private
Mamata Medical College	Khammam	1998	Kaloji Narayana Rao University of Health Sciences	Private
MediCiti Institute of Medical Sciences	Medchal	2002	Kaloji Narayana Rao University of Health Sciences	Private
Neelima Institute of Medical Sciences	Malkajgiri	2023	Anurag University	Private
Nizam's Institute of Medical Sciences	Hyderabad	1961	Autonomous	Government of Telangana
Osmania Medical College	Hyderabad	1846	Kaloji Narayana Rao University of Health Sciences	Government of Telangana
Prathima Institute of Medical Sciences	Karimnagar	2001	Kaloji Narayana Rao University of Health Sciences	Private
Rajiv Gandhi Institute of Medical Sciences	Adilabad	2008	Kaloji Narayana Rao University of Health Sciences	Government of Telangana
Shadan Institute of Medical Sciences	Hyderabad	2003	Kaloji Narayana Rao University of Health Sciences	Private
SVS Medical College	Mahabubnagar	1999	Kaloji Narayana Rao University of Health Sciences	Private

== Tripura ==
Name	Location	Established	University	Funding/ownership
Agartala Government Medical College	Agartala	2005	Tripura University	Government of Tripura
Tripura Medical College & Dr. B.R. Ambedkar Memorial Teaching Hospital	Agartala	2006	Tripura University	Private (PPP Model)
Tripura Santiniketan Medical College	Agartala	2024	Tripura University	Private

== Uttar Pradesh ==
Name	Location	Established	University	Funding/ownership
Ajay Sangaal Institute of Medical Sciences and Research	Shamli	2024	Atal Bihari Vajpayee Medical University	Private
All India Institute of Medical Sciences	Gorakhpur	2019	Autonomous	Government of India
All India Institute of Medical Sciences	Raebareli	2019	Autonomous	Government of India
Amar Shaheed Jodha Singh Attaiya Thakur Dariyao Singh Medical College	Fatehpur	2021	Atal Bihari Vajpayee Medical University	Government of Uttar Pradesh
Autonomous State Medical College	Akbarpur	2024	Atal Bihari Vajpayee Medical University	Government of Uttar Pradesh
Autonomous State Medical College	Auraiya	2024	Atal Bihari Vajpayee Medical University	Government of Uttar Pradesh
Autonomous State Medical College	Firozabad	2019	Atal Bihari Vajpayee Medical University	Government of Uttar Pradesh
Autonomous State Medical College	Gonda	2024	Atal Bihari Vajpayee Medical University	Government of Uttar Pradesh
Autonomous State Medical College	Hardoi	2021	Atal Bihari Vajpayee Medical University	Government of Uttar Pradesh
Autonomous State Medical College	Kaushambi	2024	Atal Bihari Vajpayee Medical University	Government of Uttar Pradesh
Autonomous State Medical College	Kushinagar	2024	Atal Bihari Vajpayee Medical University	Government of Uttar Pradesh
Autonomous State Medical College	Lalitpur	2024	Atal Bihari Vajpayee Medical University	Government of Uttar Pradesh
Autonomous State Medical College	Pilibhit	2024	Atal Bihari Vajpayee Medical University	Government of Uttar Pradesh
Autonomous State Medical College and Allied Pt. Ram Prasad Bismil Hospital	Shahjahanpur	2019	Atal Bihari Vajpayee Medical University	Government of Uttar Pradesh
Autonomous State Medical College	Sonbhadra	2024	Atal Bihari Vajpayee Medical University	Government of Uttar Pradesh
Autonomous State Medical College	Sultanpur	2024	Atal Bihari Vajpayee Medical University	Government of Uttar Pradesh
Baba Kinaram Autonomous State Medical College	Chandauli	2024	Atal Bihari Vajpayee Medical University	Government of Uttar Pradesh
Baba Raghav Das Medical College	Gorakhpur	1972	Atal Bihari Vajpayee Medical University	Government of Uttar Pradesh
Career Institute of Medical Sciences and Hospital	Lucknow	2011	Atal Bihari Vajpayee Medical University	Private
Dr. Bhimrao Ramji Ambedkar Government Medical College	Kannauj	2012	Atal Bihari Vajpayee Medical University	Government of Uttar Pradesh
Dr. KNS Memorial Institute of Medical Sciences	Barabanki	2012	Atal Bihari Vajpayee Medical University	Private
Dr. Ram Manohar Lohia Institute of Medical Sciences	Lucknow	2006	Autonomous	Government of Uttar Pradesh
Dr. Sone Lal Patel Autonomous State Medical College	Pratapgarh	2021	Atal Bihari Vajpayee Medical University	Government of Uttar Pradesh
Era's Lucknow Medical College	Lucknow	1997	Era University	Private
F. H. Medical College and Hospital	Agra	2014	Atal Bihari Vajpayee Medical University	Private
Ganesh Shankar Vidyarthi Memorial Medical College	Kanpur	1955	Atal Bihari Vajpayee Medical University	Government of Uttar Pradesh
GCRG Institute of Medical Sciences	Lucknow	2008	Atal Bihari Vajpayee Medical University	Private
Glocal Medical College Super Speciality Hospital and Research Centre	Saharanpur	2016	Glocal University	Private
Government Institute of Medical Sciences	Greater Noida	2019	Atal Bihari Vajpayee Medical University	Government of Uttar Pradesh
Government Medical College and Super Facility Hospital	Azamgarh	2013	Atal Bihari Vajpayee Medical University	Government of Uttar Pradesh
Government Medical College	Budaun	2019	Atal Bihari Vajpayee Medical University	Government of Uttar Pradesh
G. S. Medical College and Hospital	Hapur	2017	Atal Bihari Vajpayee Medical University	Private
Heritage Institute of Medical Sciences	Varanasi	2015	Atal Bihari Vajpayee Medical University	Private
Hind Institute of Medical Sciences	Barabanki	2009	Atal Bihari Vajpayee Medical University	Private
Hind Institute of Medical Sciences	Sitapur	2015	Atal Bihari Vajpayee Medical University	Private
Institute of Medical Sciences	Varanasi	1960	Banaras Hindu University	Government of India
Integral Institute of Medical Sciences and Research	Lucknow	2013	Integral University	Private
Jawaharlal Nehru Medical College	Aligarh	1962	Aligarh Muslim University	Government of India
Kalyan Singh Government Medical College	Bulandshahr	2024	Atal Bihari Vajpayee Medical University	Government of Uttar Pradesh
Kanti Devi Medical College Hospital and Research Centre	Mathura	2015	Atal Bihari Vajpayee Medical University	Private
King George's Medical University	Lucknow	1905	Autonomous	Government of Uttar Pradesh
KMC Medical College & Hospital	Maharajganj	2024	Atal Bihari Vajpayee Medical University	Private (PPP Model)
Krishna Mohan Medical College and Hospital	Mathura	2016	Atal Bihari Vajpayee Medical University	Private
Lala Lajpat Rai Memorial Medical College	Meerut	1966	Atal Bihari Vajpayee Medical University	Government of Uttar Pradesh
Maa Vindhyavasini Autonomous State Medical College	Mirzapur	2021	Atal Bihari Vajpayee Medical University	Government of Uttar Pradesh
Madhav Prasad Tripathi Medical College and Hospital	Siddharthnagar	2021	Atal Bihari Vajpayee Medical University	Government of Uttar Pradesh
Mahamaya Rajkiya Allopathic Medical College	Ambedkar Nagar	2011	Atal Bihari Vajpayee Medical University	Government of Uttar Pradesh
Maharaja Suhel Dev Autonomous State Medical College	Bahraich	2019	Atal Bihari Vajpayee Medical University	Government of Uttar Pradesh
Maharani Laxmi Bai Medical College	Jhansi	1968	Atal Bihari Vajpayee Medical University	Government of Uttar Pradesh
Maharshi Devraha Baba Medical College	Deoria	2021	Atal Bihari Vajpayee Medical University	Government of Uttar Pradesh
Maharshi Vashishtha Autonomous State Medical College	Basti	2019	Atal Bihari Vajpayee Medical University	Government of Uttar Pradesh
Maharshi Vishwamitra Autonomous State Medical College	Ghazipur	2021	Atal Bihari Vajpayee Medical University	Government of Uttar Pradesh
Mahatma Vidur Autonomous State Medical College	Bijnor	2024	Atal Bihari Vajpayee Medical University	Government of Uttar Pradesh
Major S.D. Singh Medical College & Hospital	Farrukhabad	2011	Atal Bihari Vajpayee Medical University	Private
Manyavar Kanshi Ram Ji Government Allopathic Medical College	Jalaun	2013	Atal Bihari Vajpayee Medical University	Government of Uttar Pradesh
Motilal Nehru Medical College	Prayagraj	1961	Atal Bihari Vajpayee Medical University	Government of Uttar Pradesh
Muzaffarnagar Medical College	Muzaffarnagar	2006	Atal Bihari Vajpayee Medical University	Private
Naraina Medical College and Research Centre	Kanpur	2021	Atal Bihari Vajpayee Medical University	Private
National Capital Region Institute of Medical Sciences	Meerut	2018	Atal Bihari Vajpayee Medical University	Private
Netaji Subhash Chandra Bose Subharti Medical College	Meerut	1996	Swami Vivekanand Subharti University	Private
Noida International Institute of Medical Sciences	Noida	2020	Noida International University	Private
Prasad Institute of Medical Sciences	Lucknow	2016	Atal Bihari Vajpayee Medical University	Private
Rajarshi Dasarath Autonomous State Medical College	Ayodhya	2019	Atal Bihari Vajpayee Medical University	Government of Uttar Pradesh
Rajshree Medical Research Institute	Bareilly	2014	Atal Bihari Vajpayee Medical University	Private
Rama Medical College, Hospital and Research Centre	Hapur	2011	Atal Bihari Vajpayee Medical University	Private
Rama Medical College, Hospital and Research Centre	Kanpur	2008	Atal Bihari Vajpayee Medical University	Private
Rani Durgavati Medical College	Banda	2016	Atal Bihari Vajpayee Medical University	Government of Uttar Pradesh
Rohilkhand Medical College and Hospital	Bareilly	2006	Bareilly International University	Private
Sanjay Gandhi Postgraduate Institute of Medical Sciences	Lucknow	1983	Autonomous	Government of Uttar Pradesh
Santosh Medical College	Ghaziabad	1996	Santosh University	Private
Saraswathi Institute of Medical Sciences	Hapur	2008	Atal Bihari Vajpayee Medical University	Private
Saraswati Medical College	Unnao	2016	Atal Bihari Vajpayee Medical University	Private
Sarojini Naidu Medical College	Agra	1854	Atal Bihari Vajpayee Medical University	Government of Uttar Pradesh
School of Medical Sciences and Research	Greater Noida	2009	Sharda University	Private
Shaikh-Ul-Hind Maulana Mahmood Hasan Medical College	Saharanpur	2015	Atal Bihari Vajpayee Medical University	Government of Uttar Pradesh
Shri Gorakshnath Medical College Hospital and Research Centre	Gorakhpur	2024	Mahayogi Gorakhnath University	Private
Shri Ram Murti Smarak Institute of Medical Sciences	Bareilly	2005	Atal Bihari Vajpayee Medical University	Private
Shri Siddhi Vinayak Medical College	Sambhal	2024	Atal Bihari Vajpayee Medical University	Private
SKS Hospital Medical College and Research Centre	Mathura	2023	Atal Bihari Vajpayee Medical University	Private
T. S. Misra Medical College and Hospital	Lucknow	2016	Dr. Shakuntala Misra National Rehabilitation University	Private
Teerthanker Mahaveer Medical College & Research Centre	Moradabad	2008	Teerthanker Mahaveer University	Private
Uma Nath Singh Autonomous State Medical College	Jaunpur	2021	Atal Bihari Vajpayee Medical University	Government of Uttar Pradesh
United Institute of Medical Sciences	Prayagraj	2020	Atal Bihari Vajpayee Medical University	Private
Uttar Pradesh University of Medical Sciences	Etawah	2006	Autonomous	Government of Uttar Pradesh
Varun Arjun Medical College	Shahjahanpur	2016	Varun Arjun University	Private
Veerangana Avanti Bai Lodhi Autonomous State Medical College	Etah	2021	Atal Bihari Vajpayee Medical University	Government of Uttar Pradesh
Venkateshwara Institute of Medical Sciences	Gajraula	2016	Shri Venkateshwara University	Private

== Uttarakhand ==
Name	Location	Established	University	Funding/ownership
All India Institute of Medical Sciences	Rishikesh	2012	Autonomous	Government of India
Gautam Buddha Chikitsa Mahavidyalaya	Dehradun	2022	Ras Bihari Bose Subharti University	Private
Government Doon Medical College	Dehradun	2016	Hemwati Nandan Bahuguna Uttarakhand Medical Education University	Government of Uttarakhand
Government Medical College	Haldwani	2001	Hemwati Nandan Bahuguna Uttarakhand Medical Education University	Government of Uttarakhand
Graphic Era Institute of Medical Sciences	Dehradun	2024	Graphic Era University	Private
Himalayan Institute of Medical Sciences	Dehradun	1995	Swami Rama Himalayan University	Private
Shri Guru Ram Rai Institute of Medical and Health Sciences	Dehradun	2006	Shri Guru Ram Rai University	Private
Soban Singh Jeena Government Institute of Medical Science and Research	Almora	2021	Hemwati Nandan Bahuguna Uttarakhand Medical Education University	Government of Uttarakhand
Veer Chandra Singh Garhwali Government Institute of Medical Science and Research	Srinagar	2008	Hemwati Nandan Bahuguna Uttarakhand Medical Education University	Government of Uttarakhand

== West Bengal ==
Name	Location	Established	University	Funding/ownership
All India Institute of Hygiene and Public Health	Kolkata	1932	West Bengal University of Health Sciences	Government of India
All India Institute of Medical Sciences	Kalyani	2019	Autonomous	Government of India
Bankura Sammilani Medical College and Hospital	Bankura	1956	West Bengal University of Health Sciences	Government of West Bengal
Barasat Government Medical College and Hospital	Barasat	2022	West Bengal University of Health Sciences	Government of West Bengal
Burdwan Medical College and Hospital	Purba Bardhaman	1969	West Bengal University of Health Sciences	Government of West Bengal
Calcutta National Medical College	Kolkata	1948	West Bengal University of Health Sciences	Government of West Bengal
Calcutta School of Tropical Medicine	Kolkata	1914	West Bengal University of Health Sciences	Government of West Bengal
Chittaranjan National Cancer Institute	Kolkata	1950	West Bengal University of Health Sciences	Government of India
College of Medicine and JNM Hospital	Kalyani	2009	West Bengal University of Health Sciences	Government of West Bengal
College of Medicine and Sagore Dutta Hospital	Kamarhati	2010	West Bengal University of Health Sciences	Government of West Bengal
Deben Mahata Government Medical College and Hospital	Purulia	2020	West Bengal University of Health Sciences	Government of West Bengal
Diamond Harbour Government Medical College and Hospital	Diamond Harbour	2019	West Bengal University of Health Sciences	Government of West Bengal
Dr. B. C. Roy Post Graduate Institute of Paediatric Sciences	Kolkata	2010	West Bengal University of Health Sciences	Government of West Bengal
East West Institute of Medical Sciences and Research	Burdwan	2024	West Bengal University of Health Sciences	Private
ESIC Medical College	Joka	2013	West Bengal University of Health Sciences	Government of India
ESIC Medical College and PGIMSR	Maniktala	2013	West Bengal University of Health Sciences	Government of India
Gouri Devi Institute of Medical Sciences and Hospital	Durgapur	2016	West Bengal University of Health Sciences	Private
ICARE Institute of Medical Sciences and Research	Haldia	2011	West Bengal University of Health Sciences	Private
Institute of Child Health	Kolkata	1953	West Bengal University of Health Sciences	Private
IPGMER and SSKM Hospital	Kolkata	1957	West Bengal University of Health Sciences	Government of West Bengal
IQ City Medical College	Durgapur	2013	West Bengal University of Health Sciences	Private
Jagannath Gupta Institute of Medical Sciences and Hospital	Budge Budge	2016	West Bengal University of Health Sciences	Private
Jagannath Gupta Institute of Medical Sciences and Hospital	Sodepur	2025	West Bengal University of Health Sciences	Private
Jakir Hossain Medical College and Research Institute	Jangipur	2024	West Bengal University of Health Sciences	Private
Jalpaiguri Government Medical College and Hospital	Jalpaiguri	2022	West Bengal University of Health Sciences	Government of West Bengal
Jhargram Government Medical College and Hospital	Jhargram	2021	West Bengal University of Health Sciences	Government of West Bengal
JIS School of Medical Science & Research	Santragachi	2023	JIS University	Private
JMN Medical College and Hospital	Chakdaha	2023	West Bengal University of Health Sciences	Private
KPC Medical College and Hospital	Kolkata	2006	West Bengal University of Health Sciences	Private (PPP Model)
Krishnanagar Institute of Medical Science	Krishnanagar	2024	West Bengal University of Health Sciences	Private
Maharaja Jitendra Narayan Medical College and Hospital	Cooch Behar	2018	West Bengal University of Health Sciences	Government of West Bengal
Malda Medical College and Hospital	Malda	2011	West Bengal University of Health Sciences	Government of West Bengal
Medical College and Hospital	Kolkata	1835	West Bengal University of Health Sciences	Government of West Bengal
Midnapore Medical College and Hospital	Midnapore	2004	West Bengal University of Health Sciences	Government of West Bengal
Murshidabad Medical College and Hospital	Berhampore	2012	West Bengal University of Health Sciences	Government of West Bengal
Nil Ratan Sircar Medical College and Hospital	Kolkata	1873	West Bengal University of Health Sciences	Government of West Bengal
North Bengal Medical College and Hospital	Siliguri	1968	West Bengal University of Health Sciences	Government of West Bengal
PKG Medical College and Hospital	New Town	2024	West Bengal University of Health Sciences	Private
Prafulla Chandra Sen Government Medical College and Hospital	Arambagh	2022	West Bengal University of Health Sciences	Government of West Bengal
Raiganj Government Medical College and Hospital	Raiganj	2018	West Bengal University of Health Sciences	Government of West Bengal
Rampurhat Government Medical College and Hospital	Rampurhat	2018	West Bengal University of Health Sciences	Government of West Bengal
Raniganj Institute of Medical Sciences	Raniganj	2025	West Bengal University of Health Sciences	Private
R. G. Kar Medical College and Hospital	Kolkata	1886	West Bengal University of Health Sciences	Government of West Bengal
Santiniketan Medical College	Bolpur	2021	West Bengal University of Health Sciences	Private (PPP Model)
Sarat Chandra Chattopadhyay Government Medical College and Hospital	Uluberia	2022	West Bengal University of Health Sciences	Government of West Bengal
Shri Ramkrishna Institute of Medical Sciences and Sanaka Hospital	Durgapur	2019	West Bengal University of Health Sciences	Private
SKS Medical College and Bengal Hospital	Durgapur	2023	West Bengal University of Health Sciences	Private
Tamralipto Government Medical College and Hospital	Tamluk	2022	West Bengal University of Health Sciences	Government of West Bengal
Vivekananda Institute of Medical Sciences	Kolkata	1963	West Bengal University of Health Sciences	Private

== See also ==
- List of deemed universities
- List of hospitals in India
