= List of nursing colleges in India =

This is list of notable Nursing colleges in India.

== States ==
=== Andhra Pradesh ===
- Dr. NTR University of Health Sciences

=== Bihar ===
- Anugrah Narayan Magadh Medical College and Hospital
- Darbhanga Medical College and Hospital
- Indira Gandhi Institute of Medical Sciences
- Nalanda Medical College Hospital
- Narayan Medical College and Hospital
- AHS Nursing College & Hospital

=== Chhattisgarh ===
- Ayush & Health Sciences University Chhattisgarh

=== Goa ===
- Institute of Nursing Education, Bambolim
- Vrundavan Institute of Nursing Education, Colvale

=== Haryana ===
- Maharishi Markandeshwar University, Mullana
- Pandit Bhagwat Dayal Sharma Post Graduate Institute of Medical Sciences
- Philadelphia Hospital & School of Nursing, Ambala

=== Karnataka ===
- Government College Of Nursing, Fort, Bangalore
- Father Muller Medical College
- National Institute of Mental Health and Neurosciences
- Nitte University
- Rajiv Gandhi University of Health Sciences
- Sri Devaraj Urs College Of Nursing, Kolar
- Vydehi Institute of Medical Sciences and Research Centre
- Yenepoya University
- AECS Pavan College Of Nursing, Kolar

=== Kerala ===
- Jubilee Mission Medical College & Research Centre

=== Maharashtra ===
- Armed Forces Medical College
- B. J. Medical College
- Government Medical College, Nagpur
- Grant Medical College and Sir Jamshedjee Jeejeebhoy Group of Hospitals
- Maharashtra University of Health Sciences
- SNDT Women's University

=== Manipur ===
- Jawaharlal Nehru Institute of Medical Sciences
- Regional Institute of Medical Sciences

=== Meghalaya ===
- North Eastern Indira Gandhi Regional Institute of Health and Medical Sciences

=== Odisha ===
- MKCG Medical College and Hospital

=== Punjab ===
- Christian Medical College, Ludhiana
- Desh Bhagat University
- Postgraduate Institute of Medical Education and Research
- Baba Farid University of Health Sciences
- RIMT University
- Universal Institute of Nursing

=== Rajasthan ===
- Tantia University

=== Sikkim ===
- Sikkim Manipal Institute of Medical Sciences

=== Tamil Nadu ===
- Jawaharlal Institute of Postgraduate Medical Education and Research
- J.K.K. Nattraja College of Nursing and Research/Sresakthimayeil Institute of Nursing and Research
- Madras Medical College
- Saveetha University
- Sri Ramachandra Medical College and Research Institute
- Tamil Nadu Dr. M.G.R. Medical University
- Vinayaka Missions University
- AJK College Of Nursing

=== Tripura ===
- Tripura Medical College & Dr. B.R. Ambedkar Memorial Teaching Hospital

=== Uttar Pradesh ===
- Uttar Pradesh University of Medical Sciences
- Institute of Medical Sciences, Banaras Hindu University
- King George's Medical University
- College of Nursing, MVASMC Basti
- Sharda University
- Mangalayatan University, Aligarh

=== Uttarakhand ===
- H.N.B. Uttarakhand Medical Education University
- Shri Guru Ram Rai Institute of Medical & Health Sciences
- Swami Rama Himalayan University

=== West Bengal ===
- Medical College and Hospital, Kolkata
- West Bengal University of Health Sciences
- Brainware University

== Union Territories ==
=== Delhi ===
- All India Institute of Medical Sciences, Delhi
- Jamia Hamdard
- Lady Hardinge Medical College

=== Jammu and Kashmir ===
- Sher-e-Kashmir Institute of Medical Sciences
- IPHH College of Nursing and Allied Health Science, Jammu
