= Bhagat Phool Singh Government Medical College for Women =

Medical College for women in Haryana, India

Coordinates: 29.1505202°N 76.8104364°E

- Other names: BPS Government Medical College for Women, Sonepat
- Type: Medical College and hospital
- Established: 2013; 13 years ago
- Affiliations: Pandit Bhagwat Dayal Sharma University of Health Sciences
- Director: Dr. J. C. Dureja
- Location: Sonepat, Haryana, India, India
- Website: www.bpsgmckhanpur.ac.in

Bhagat Phool Singh Government Medical College for Women is a public women's medical college at Khanpur Kalan in the Gohana in Sonepat district of Haryana in India. It is the first women's Government Medical College of independent India and the first such institution in North India since Delhi's Lady Hardinge Medical College that was established in 1914. The college was inaugurated on International Women's Day, 2013 by Sonia Gandhi, congress party chief.

== History ==
In 2008, the Chief Minister of Haryana, Bhupinder Singh Hooda first announced the plan for establishing a women's medical college under the Bhagat Phool Singh Women's University at Khanpur Kalan but got affiliation from Pandit Bhagwat Dayal Sharma University of Health Sciences which was established in 2008 and became affiliating university of all Medical Colleges of Haryana state. On 1 March 2009, Sonia Gandhi laid the foundation stone of this college. The associated hospital of this college became operational in 2011 with 100 beds and a team of 21 doctors. This number has since grown to 450 beds and 211 doctors as of March 2013.

== Campus ==
The college is spread over 88 acres of land and was set up at a cost of ₹ 700 crores.

== Courses and Affiliation ==
Bhagat Phool Singh Government Medical College for Women undertakes the education and training of students in MBBS courses. The college is recognised by National Medical Commission and is affiliated with the Pandit Bhagwat Dayal Sharma University of Health Sciences. Like all other Indian medical colleges, student admission in this college happens on the basis of merit through National Eligibility and Entrance Test.

== Notable alumni ==
- Manushi Chhillar – winner of Miss World 2017 pageant and actress.

== See also ==
- List of medical colleges in Haryana
