= Shaheed Hasan Khan Mewati Government Medical College =

Medical college in Haryana, India

Shaheed Hassan Khan Mewati Government Medical College
- Type: Public
- Established: 12 August 2012; 13 years ago
- Affiliations: National Medical Commission
- Academic affiliations: Pandit Bhagwat Dayal Sharma University of Health Sciences
- Director: Dr. Mukesh Kumar
- Location: Nalhar, Nuh, Haryana, 122107; 28.090662°N 76.973167°E
- Campus: Rural
- Website: www.gmcmewat.ac.in

Shaheed Hasan Khan Mewati Government Medical College (SHKM GMC), is an Indian Medical College in the Nuh district of Haryana. The college is 75 km from Delhi on National Highway 8, 47 km from Gurgaon and 57 km from Faridabad. The college provides undergraduate medical education (Bachelor of Medicine, Bachelor of Surgery). The college is accredited by the National Medical Commission.

== History ==
In 2009, a Haryana Legislative Assembly act had officially established the medical college. The institution is named after Raja Hasan Khan Mewati, the Muslim Khanzada Rajput ruler of Mewat who was martyred by the Mughals in the battle of Khanwa, hence he was given the honorific title of Shaheed.

The first foundation stone for establishment was placed on 18 July 2009, under the presence of Chief Minister, Bhupinder Singh Hooda, Gurgaon MP Rao Inderjit Singh, Dr. Krishna Pandit, Azad Mohammed, and MLA Habib Ur Rehman.

On 12 August 2012, the college was fully established, and the inaugural batch of students was admitted in 2013. In 2024, Chief Minister Manohar Lal Khattar unveiled a 15-foot statue of Mewati at the medical college. He also announced the creation of the Shaheed Hasan Khan Mewati Chair at the medical college.

The current officiating director is Dr. Mukesh Kumar. The college includes a hospital located at 28.091116°N 76.972009°E.

== See also ==
- List of medical colleges in Haryana
