= All India Institute of Medical Sciences, Bibinagar =

Medical college and hospital in Telangana, India

- Motto: Sarve janah sukhinaḥ bhavantu
- Motto in English: May the entire world be happy
- Type: Public
- Established: 2019; 7 years ago
- President: Dr. Chandrashekhar Mahadeorao Meshram
- Director: Dr. Amita Aggarwal
- Location: Bibinagar, Hyderabad Metropolitan Region, Telangana, India; 17.471°N 78.778°E
- Campus: Urban, 200 acres
- Language: Telugu and English
- Website: aiimsbibinagar.edu.in

All India Institute of Medical Sciences, Bibinagar (AIIMS Bibinagar) is a public medical college and hospital located in the villages of Rangapur and Kondamadugu Bibinagar mandal, Yadadri Bhuvanagiri District Hyderabad Metropolitan Region on the (NH –163) Hyderabad-Warangal National Highway. It is one of the six All India Institutes of Medical Sciences (AIIMSs) that started primary operations in 2019 and has largest campus among all AIIMS in India.

== History ==
The All India Institutes of Medical Sciences (AIIMSs) are set up as part of the Pradhan Mantri Swasthya Suraksha Yojana (PMSSY) initiative, announced by the Government of India in 2003 and officially launched in March 2006, for the purpose of "correcting regional imbalances in the availability of affordable/reliable tertiary healthcare services", through setting up AIIMS Delhi-like institutions and upgrading government medical colleges.

As an outcome of the Bifurcation of Andhra Pradesh and the creation of Telangana in June 2014, the central government was mandated through the Andhra Pradesh Reorganisation Act, 2014 to create an AIIMS in Andhra Pradesh, which was to become All India Institute of Medical Sciences, Mangalagiri in 2018. While the act does not mention an AIIMS in Telangana, the central government has assured the government of Telangana in 2014 that it will consider such an institute in Telangana as well. As early as July 2014, the government of Telangana has toyed with the idea of offering the yet-to-be-operational Bibinagar, YBG Dist campus of Nizam's Institute of Medical Sciences (NIMS) for establishing said AIIMS, a decision which was announced in January 2015. In September 2016 a contradictory announcement was made, stating that the AIIMS was to be established at Bhongir instead, due to higher availability of land.

In February 2017, in the budget presentation for 2017–2018, the Minister of Finance Arun Jaitley announced two AIIMSs, in Jharkhand and Gujarat, but an institute in Telangana was not mentioned. A week later, Jaitley rectified this and officially announced at the parliament that an AIIMS will be set in Telangana as well. In April 2018, the central government has given an in-principle approval for the institute and the state government was asked to identify three of four possible locations for the AIIMS. The state government offered the Bibinagar campus, and following an inspection visit the location was approved in July, under conditions that an additional 49-acre of land will be acquired and that some infrastructure improvements are made. Finally, the official approval by the union cabinet was made on 17 December 2018 at an estimated cost of ₹1,028 crore (US$110 million). The institute was later denoted as "Phase-VII" of PMSSY.

The land for the AIIMS was officially handed over to the central government in February 2019 and in May it was announced that classes will start in August, from the Bibinagar campus. The institute became operational with the first batch of 50 MBBS students, which started in August 2019, one of the six AIIMSs to become operational in 2019. AIIMS Bhopal was set as the mentoring institution, and its director, Sarman Singh, also acting as director in charge. In December 2019 the mentoring institution changed to Jawaharlal Institute of Postgraduate Medical Education and Research (JIPMER). Vikas Bhatia was appointed as director in March 2020.

== Campus and Hospital ==
AIIMS occupies the former Bibinagar campus of Nizam's Institute of Medical Sciences (NIMS), which as of December 2019, is under construction, spread across 200 acres ending up to be largest AIIMS campus in India. Outpatient services (OP) was expected to start in December 2019, with inpatient services in March 2020. However, due to the change of mentorship, OP opening was postponed to February 2020, a date which was also missed. Finally after a wait of 17 years, installed with an equipment worth 183 crores and annual maintenance budget of 200 crores, this hospital is fully operational from September 2022. It is about 12 km from district headquarters Bhongir. The nearest railway station is 2 km away and international airport (Samshabad) is located at a distance of about 50 km.

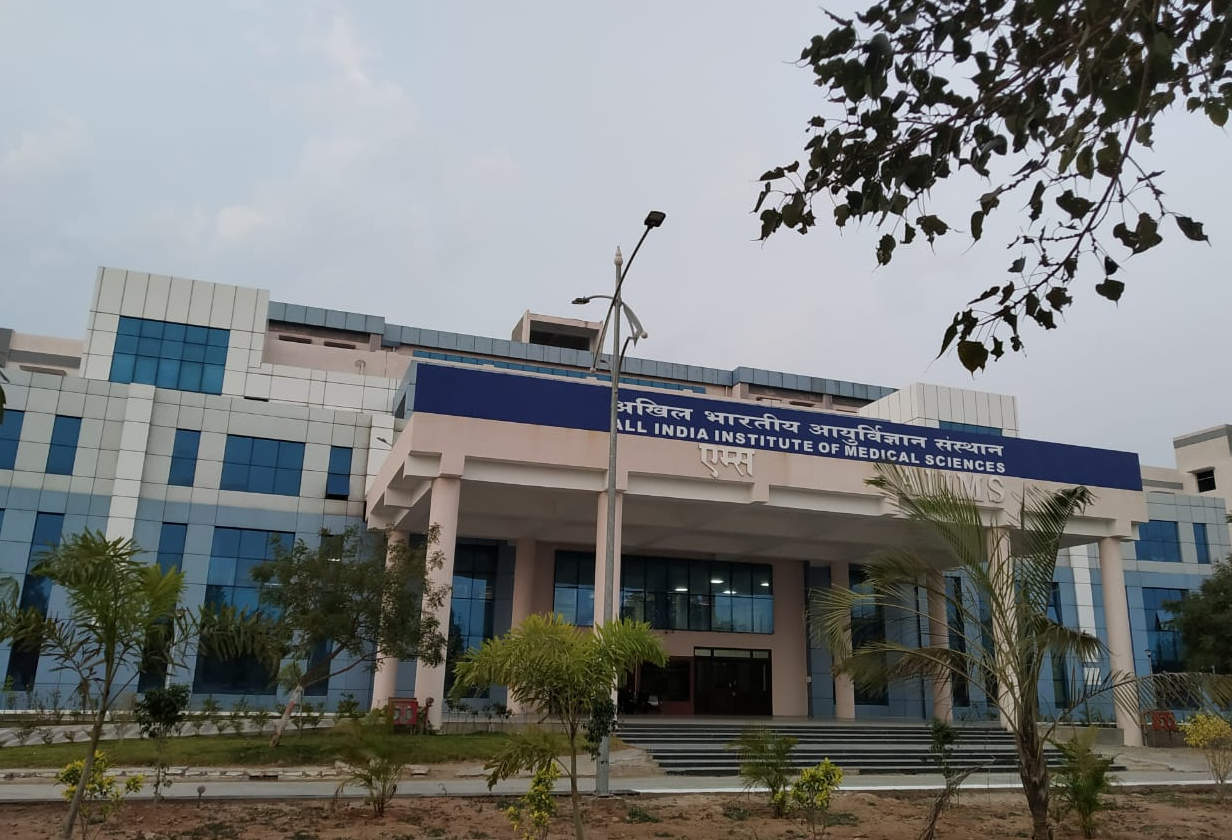
AIIMS, Bibinagar

== See also ==
- List of medical colleges in India
