= Pacific Medical College and Hospital, Udaipur =

Private college in Rajasthan, India

Pacific Medical University
- Type: Private university
- Established: 2014; 12 years ago
- Founder: Rahul Agarwal
- Affiliations: Rajasthan University of Health Sciences (since 2015); Pacific Medical University (2013–2015)
- President: Dr.(Prof.) Madan Mohan Mangal
- Dean: Dr. Ummeed Singh Parihar
- Director: Aman Agarwal
- Location: Udaipur, Rajasthan, 313011, India; 24.6688628°N 73.7001192°E
- Campus: 32.14; Urban
- Website: www.pacificmedicaluniversity.ac.in

Pacific Medical College & Hospital is a private medical college in Udaipur, Rajasthan, India.

== Academics ==
The admission to the M.B.B.S. course is highly competitive. Students who have graduated from high school with Physics, Chemistry and Biology as core subjects can appear for in the UG admission test. The medical college offers 150 seats in M.B.B.S. course. 15% of total M.B.B.S. seats are for NRI candidates. Remaining seats are filled through NEET

== See also ==
- List of medical colleges in India
- List of medical colleges in Rajasthan
- Colleges and institutes in India
