= Government Medical College, Shahdol =

Birsa Munda Government Medical College
- Type: Medical College and Hospital
- Established: 2018; 8 years ago
- Academic affiliations: Madhya Pradesh Medical Science University
- Dean: Dr. Girish B. Ramteke
- Location: Shahdol, Madhya Pradesh, India; 23.310°N 81.399°E
- Website: https://gmcshahdol.org/

Birsa Munda Government Medical College, Shahdol is a full-fledged tertiary Medical college in Shahdol, Madhya Pradesh. It was established in the year 2018. The college imparts the degree of Bachelor of Medicine and Surgery (MBBS). Nursing and para-medical courses are also offered. The college is affiliated to Madhya Pradesh Medical Science University and is recognized by National Medical Commission. The selection to the college is done on the basis of merit through National Eligibility and Entrance Test.

== Courses ==
Government Medical College, Shahdol undertakes the education and training of students MBBS courses.
