= Government Medical College, Ratlam =

Medical College in Madhya Pradesh, India

Dr. Laxmi Narayan Pandey Government Medical College
- Type: Medical College and Hospital
- Established: 2018; 8 years ago
- Academic affiliations: Madhya Pradesh Medical Science University
- Dean: Anita Mutha
- Location: Ratlam, Madhya Pradesh, India; 23.371°N 75.023°E
- Website: https://www.gmcratlam.org/

Dr. Laxmi Narayan Pandey Government Medical College, Ratlam is a full-fledged tertiary Medical college in Ratlam, Madhya Pradesh, India. It was established in the year 2018. The college imparts the degree of Bachelor of Medicine and Surgery (MBBS). Nursing and para-medical courses are also offered. The college is affiliated to Madhya Pradesh Medical Science University and is recognized by National Medical Commission. The selection to the college is done on the basis of merit through National Eligibility and Entrance Test.

== Courses ==
Government Medical College, Ratlam undertakes the education and training of students MBBS courses.
