= Government Medical College, Chhindwara =

Medical college in Madhya Pradesh

Chhindwara Institute of Medical Sciences
- Type: Medical College and Hospital
- Established: 2019; 7 years ago
- Academic affiliations: Madhya Pradesh Medical Science University
- Principal: Dr. Abhay Kumar
- Location: Chhindwara, Madhya Pradesh, India; 22.064°N 78.935°E
- Website: http://govtmedicalcollegechhindwara.com/

Chhindwara Institute of Medical Sciences is a full-fledged tertiary Medical college in Chhindwara, Madhya Pradesh. It was established in the year 2019. The college imparts the degree of Bachelor of Medicine and Surgery (MBBS). Nursing and para-medical courses are also offered. The college is affiliated to Madhya Pradesh Medical Science University and is recognized by National Medical Commission. The selection to the college is done on the basis of merit through National Eligibility and Entrance Test.

== Courses ==
Government Medical College, Chhindwara undertakes the education and training of students MBBS courses.
