= Malwanchal University =

Private university in Madhya Pradesh

- Type: Private
- Established: 2016
- Affiliations: UGC
- Chancellor: Gouri Singh Bhadoria
- Vice-Chancellor: Sanjeev Narang
- Location: Indore, Madhya Pradesh, India; 22.682°N 76.051°E
- Website: http://www.malwanchaluniversity.com/

Malwanchal University was established in 2007 as Index medical educational Institution built across 65 acres of infrastructures, over 500 plus faculty members. It is a private recognized university in Indore, Madhya Pradesh, India.

Malwanchal University is governed by a team led by Chairperson-cum-Chancellor Mrs. Gauri Singh Bhadoria and Vice Chancellor Dr. Sanjeev Narang and Registrar Dr. Lokeshwar Singh Jodhana. Malwanchal University and Index Medical College is now under CBI investigation for a fraud case regarding fake medical PhD degree case and fake faculty case.

== Accreditations ==
Malwanchal University was established and approved by Madhya Pradesh State Government and UGC, under the Section 2(f) and also accredited by the National Assessment and Accreditation Council (NAAC).
