= Saraswati Medical College =

- Type: Private medical college
- Established: 2016
- Academic affiliations: Atal Bihari Vajpayee Medical University (ABVMU)
- Principal: Dr. R. N. Srivastava
- Dean: Dr. R. N. Srivastava
- Location: Unnao, Uttar Pradesh, India
- Website: saraswatimedical.ac.in

Saraswati Medical College is a private medical institute in Unnao, Uttar Pradesh, India, under the aegis of Saraswati Group of Educational Institutes which also has a Dental college and a 300-bed Hospital.

In February 2021, the Supreme Court of India imposed a fine of Rs 5 crore on the Saraswati Education Charitable Trust, the administrative body for the medical college, for admitting 132 MB BS students without necessary permission from the Director General Medical Education, Uttar Pradesh and found to be in violation of the Medical Council of India (now the National Medical Commission).
