= Pandit Bhagwat Dayal Sharma Post Graduate Institute of Medical Sciences =

Medical college in Haryana, India

Pandit Bhagwat Dayal Sharma Post Graduate Institute of Medical Sciences, Rohtak
- Other name: PGIMS Rohtak
- Established: 1960; 66 years ago
- Affiliations: Pandit Bhagwat Dayal Sharma University of Health Sciences, NMC
- Director: Dr. Suresh Kumar Singhal
- Location: Rohtak, Haryana, India; 28.8802°N 76.6054°E
- Nickname: PGI Rohtak
- Website: www.pgimsrohtak.ac.in

Pandit Bhagwat Dayal Sharma Post Graduate Institute of Medical Sciences (PGIMS Rohtak) is a public medical college located in Rohtak, Haryana, India. The institute offers various under graduate and post graduate courses in major specialties of medicine and surgery. It is spread across a 350-acre (140 ha) campus. It is incorporated in Pandit Bhagwat Dayal Sharma University of Health Sciences.

Pt. B. D. Sharma PGIMS, Rohtak is about 240 km (150 mi) from Chandigarh and about 70 km (43 mi) from Delhi on Delhi-Hissar-Sirsa-Fazilka National Highway (NH-10). It is one of the major Institutions for Medical Education and Research and a tertiary care centre for provision of specialized health care services not only to the people of the State of Haryana, but also to those of nearby states of Punjab, Rajasthan, Delhi and western U.P. The institute secured 50th rank in NIRF ranking in 2024.

== History ==
The institute was started under the name of Medical College, Rohtak in 1960. For the first three years, the students were admitted to Government Medical College, Patiala which acted as a host Institution. In 1963, the students were shifted to Rohtak. In the subsequent years, multifaceted expansion measures have transformed the Institute into a fully developed center of Medical Education and research in all the major disciplines of Medicine.

After the establishment of Pandit Bhagwat Dayal Sharma University of Health Sciences in 2008, it was incorporated in the university.

== Campus ==
The Institute Complex houses the following buildings:

- Medical College
- Library and Reading Hall
- Sushruta Auditorium
- Ranbir Singh OPD
- Emergency Ward
- Well Equipped Hospital of 1597 beds
- Dhanwantari Apex Trauma Centre
- Modular OT cum ICU Complex
- Lala Shyamal Super-specialty Centre
- Multi-slice whole body CT Scan building
- De-addiction center
- State Institute of Mental Health
- Mother and Child Hospital
- Dental College and Hospital
- Pharmacy College
- College of Nursing
- College of Physiotherapy
- Residential Area

The institute has a campus spread over an area of 350 acres (1.4 km^{2}) of land.

Nearly 11,38,980 patients were provided consultation and treatment in the outpatient departments (OPD) during the year 2004–2005. Out of these, 68,000 patients were admitted as indoor patients. It witnessed a daily OPD throughput of nearly 14,000 patients in 2012 and is growing constantly. Nearly 1,50,000 surgeries were done in 2012. Its bed occupancy rate is more than 100%.

== See also ==
- Similar institutes
  - All India Institutes of Medical Sciences
  - AIIMS, Badsa (Jhajjar)
  - Pandit Deen Dayal Upadhayaya University of Health Sciences, Karnal
  - List of institutions of higher education in Haryana
  - List of medical colleges in India
  - Shri Krishna AYUSH University, Kurukshetra
- Related health topics
  - Healthcare in India
  - Indian states ranking by institutional delivery
  - List of hospitals in India
