= Saraswathi Institute of Medical Sciences =

- Motto: Service to Mankind is Service to God.
- Type: Private medical school
- Established: 2008; 18 years ago
- Academic affiliations: Atal Bihari Vajpayee Medical University
- Dean: Dr. Vinay Aggarwal
- Location: Hapur, Hapur, 245304, India
- Campus: Rural, 26 acres
- Language: English
- Website: www.sims.edu.in

Saraswathi Institute of Medical Sciences is a private medical college located at Anwarpur, near Pilkhuwa in Hapur district, Uttar Pradesh, India. It was established in 2008. It is run by the Saraswathi Ammal Educational Trust. It is privately funded for profit organisation. It is affiliated under Atal Bihari Vajpayee Medical University, Lucknow, Uttar Pradesh.

== Controversies ==
In April 2022, an MBBS girl student filed an FIR against five students alleging to be brutally thrashed and dragged with hair after she opposed ragging.
