= Krishna Mohan Medical College and Hospital, Mathura =

Krishna Mohan Medical College and Hospital
- Type: Private Medical College and Hospital
- Established: 2016; 10 years ago
- Affiliations: Atal Bihari Vajpayee Medical University
- Location: Mathura, Uttar Pradesh, India
- Campus: Urban
- Website: http://www.kmmedicalcollege.in/

Krishna Mohan Medical College and Hospital, Mathura, established in 2016, is a tertiary private medical college and hospital. It is located at Mathura in Uttar Pradesh. The college provides the degree of Bachelor of Medicine and Surgery (MBBS). The yearly undergraduate student intake is 150. In July 2020, the college faced scrutiny when they raised tuition by 7% amid the COVID-19 pandemic. The college informed students of the fee hike via Whattsapp only 16 days before the fees were due.

== Affiliated ==
The college is affiliated with Atal Bihari Vajpayee Medical University and is recognized by the National Medical Commission.
