= Government Medical College, Alibag =

- Other names: Alibag Medical College
- Type: Medical College and Hospital
- Established: 2022; 4 years ago
- Affiliations: Maharashtra University of Health Sciences
- Dean: Dr. Purwa Patil
- Location: Alibag, Raigad district, Maharashtra, India
- Campus: Urban
- Website: http://www.gmchalibag.in/

Government Medical College, Alibag, established in 2022, is a full-fledged tertiary Government Medical college and hospital. It is located at Alibag in Raigad district, Maharashtra. The college imparts the degree of Bachelor of Medicine and Surgery (MBBS). The hospital associated with the college is one of the largest hospitals in the Alibag town.

== Courses ==
Government Medical College, Alibag undertakes education and training of 100 students MBBS courses.

== Affiliated ==
The college is affiliated with Maharashtra University of Health Sciences and is recognized by the National Medical Commission.
