= Krishna Institute of Medical Sciences =

College in Maharashtra, India

- Motto: Knowledge . Innovation . Excellence
- Type: Deemed to be University
- Established: 1984; 42 years ago
- Academic affiliations: NAAC; NABH; ISO; NABL
- Chairman: Dr. Suresh Bhosale
- Chancellor: Dr. Suresh Bhosale
- Vice-Chancellor: Dr. Neelam Mishra
- Dean: Dr. Shivaji T. Mohite
- Faculty: 284
- Students: 2,526
- Undergraduates: 2,011
- Postgraduates: 487
- Doctoral students: 28
- Location: Karad, Maharashtra, India; 17°15′36″N 74°10′35″E
- Campus: urban (57 acres)
- Website: www.kimskarad.in

Krishna Institute of Medical Sciences is located in Karad, Maharashtra.

The constituent faculties of the University include Medical, Dental, Physiotherapy, Nursing, Pharmacy and Biotechnology offering undergraduate and postgraduate courses in the respective faculties. It also runs Ph.D. programs and Post Doctoral Fellowships in various subjects.

The teaching hospital is 1125 bedded multispecialty tertiary care hospital with facilities for Critical Care, Endoscopic Surgeries, Dialysis, Cardiology, Cardio-vascular-thoracic-surgery, Oncology, Urology, Neurosurgery, Plastic surgery, Oral and Maxillofacial Surgery and a Renal Transplant Unit. It has fully equipped major operation theaters, minor theaters, labour rooms, blood bank accredited by NABH, radiodiagnosis and radiotherapy, computerized medical records, counseling services etc. There are separate intensive care units like Medical, Surgical, Coronary care, Pediatric, Neonatal (accredited by Neonatology Forum of India), Respiratory and Obstetrics. The radio-diagnosis department has facilities for MRI, color doppler, mammography, DSA etc.

== Ranking ==
University and college rankings

General – India
- NIRF (Universities) (2023): 101-150

Krishna Institute of Medical Sciences was ranked 43 among Universities in India by the NIRF in 2023.
