= MGM Institute of Health Sciences =

Deemed University in Maharashtra, India

- Type: Deemed to be University
- Established: 1989
- Academic affiliations: NAAC; UGC; NMC; INC
- Chancellor: Kamalkishor N. Kadam
- Vice-Chancellor: Dr. Shashank D. Dalvi
- Faculty: 901
- Students: 3,565
- Undergraduates: 2,865
- Postgraduates: 639
- Doctoral students: 61
- Location: Navi Mumbai, Maharashtra, India; 19°01′02″N 73°06′19″E
- Campus: urban
- Website: www.mgmuhs.com

Mahatma Gandhi Mission Institute of Health Sciences is a medical school located in Navi Mumbai, Maharashtra, India. It was established in 1989 and granted Deemed University status in 2006.

== Notable alumni ==
- Neha Rajpal
- Varshil Mehta
