= Government Medical College and Hospital, Nandurbar =

Medical college in Maharashtra

- Type: Medical College and Hospital
- Established: 2020; 6 years ago
- Affiliations: Maharashtra University of Health Sciences, NMC
- Dean: Dr. Sanjay Mansing Rathod
- Location: Nandurbar, Maharashtra, India
- Website: https://gmcnandurbar.com/

Government Medical College and Hospital, Nandurbar is a full-fledged tertiary referral Government Medical college in Nandurbar, Maharashtra. It was established in the year 2020. The college imparts the degree Bachelor of Medicine and Surgery (MBBS). The college is affiliated to Maharashtra University of Health Sciences and is recognized by the National Medical Commission. The hospital associated with the college is one of the largest hospitals in the Nandurbar. The selection to the college is done on the basis of merit and reservation through National Eligibility and Entrance Test.

== Courses ==
Government Medical College and Hospital, Nandurbar undertakes education and training of students MBBS courses.

== See also ==
- List of hospitals in India
