= Rohilkhand Medical College and Hospital =

Medical college in Bareilly, Uttar Pradesh, India

- Type: Private medical college and hospital
- Established: 2006; 20 years ago
- Affiliations: Bareilly International University
- Principal: Dr. Dig Vijay Singh
- Location: Bareilly, Uttar Pradesh, India; 28.38024°N 79.46209°E
- Campus: Urban
- Website: rmcbareilly.com

Rohilkhand Medical College and Hospital, established in 2006, is a full-fledged tertiary private medical college and hospital in Bareilly, Uttar Pradesh, India. The college imparts the degree of Bachelor of Medicine and Surgery (MBBS) as well as specialized and post-doctoral degrees. Nursing and para-medical courses are also offered. The yearly undergraduate student intake is 250.

== Courses ==
Rohilkhand Medical College and Hospital undertakes education and training of students in MBBS & post graduate courses.

== Affiliated ==
The college is affiliated with Bareilly International University and is recognized by the National Medical Commission.
