= Mahatma Gandhi University of Medical Sciences & Technology =

- Other name: MGUMST Jaipur
- Type: Private medical university
- Established: 2011; 15 years ago
- Chairperson: Dr. Vikas Chandra Swarankar
- President: Dr. Achal Gulati
- Location: Jaipur, Rajasthan, India; 26°46′12″N 75°51′17″E
- Website: mgumst.org
- Location in Rajasthan Location in India

Mahatma Gandhi University of Medical Sciences & Technology is a private medical university located in Jaipur in Rajasthan, India.
