= Shri Ram Murti Smarak Institute of Medical Sciences =

Private medical college in India

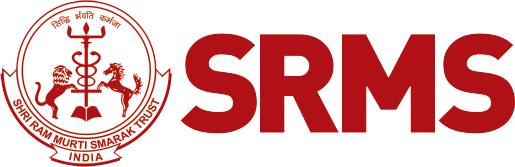
- Type: Private Medical College
- Established: 2002
- Academic affiliations: Atal Bihari Vajpayee Medical University
- Chairman: Dev Murti
- Principal: AM (Dr.) Mahendra Singh Butola (Retd.)
- Location: 13.2 km Milestone on Bareilly – Nainital Road, Bhojipura, Bareilly, Uttar Pradesh, India; 28.47933726289545°N 79.43704706301264°E
- Website: http://www.srms.ac.in/ims

Shri Ram Murti Smarak Institute of Medical Sciences is a private medical college located near Bareilly in Bareilly district, Uttar Pradesh, India. The college affiliated to Atal Bihari Vajpayee Medical University was established in 2002.

== Courses ==
=== Undergraduate Courses ===
- MBBS (Bachelor of Medicine and Bachelor of Surgery)

=== Postgraduate Courses ===
==== Pre-Clinical ====
- MD – Anatomy, Physiology, Biochemistry

==== Para-Clinical ====
- MD – Pathology, Microbiology, Pharmacology, Forensic Medicine, Community Medicine

==== Clinical ====
- MD – General Medicine, Dermatology, Anaesthesia, Paediatrics, Radiodiagnosis, General Surgery, Radiotherapy, Psychiatry, Respiratory Medicine, Emergency Medicine.
- MS – Orthopaedics, Oto Rhino Laryngology (ENT), Ophthalmology, Obstetrics & Gynaecology

=== Diploma Courses ===
- Indian Diploma in Critical Care Medicine(IDCCM)

=== Certificate Courses ===
- Post M.B.B.S Certificate Course in Critical Care

== Ranking ==
Indian national media survey agencies evaluate Medical Colleges every year on various attributes and release ranks based on cumulative scores of attributes. SRMS IMS has been ranked on grounds of its Academics, Scholars, Research and Infrastructure among top Medical Colleges in India successively.

| Surveyor | Survey Name | Year | Rank |
|---|---|---|---|
| India Today | India's best Medicine Colleges 2018 | 2018 | 32 |
| Outlook India | Top 25 Medical Colleges in India in 2017 | 2017 | 24 |
