= Varun Arjun Medical College =

- Type: Private Medical College and Hospital
- Established: 2016; 10 years ago
- Affiliations: Varun Arjun University
- Principal: Col. (Dr.) Ravindra Nath Shukla
- Location: Shahjahanpur, Uttar Pradesh, India
- Campus: Urban
- Website: https://www.varunarjunmedicalcollege.com/

Varun Arjun Medical College, established in 2016, is a full-fledged tertiary private Medical college and hospital. It is located at Shahjahanpur in Uttar Pradesh. The college imparts the degree of Bachelor of Medicine and Surgery (MB BS). The yearly undergraduate student intake is 250.

== Courses ==
Varun Arjun Medical College undertakes the education and training of 150 students in MBBS courses.

== Affiliated ==
The college is affiliated with Atal Bihari Vajpayee Medical University and is recognized by the National Medical Commission.
