= Rajmata Smt. Devendra Kumari Singhdeo Government Medical College, Ambikapur =

Medical college in Chhattisgarh

- Type: Medical college and hospital
- Established: 2016; 10 years ago
- Affiliations: Pt. Deendayal Upadhyay Memorial Health Sciences and Ayush University of Chhattisgarh
- Location: Ambikapur, Chhattisgarh, India
- Website: https://gmcambikapur.co.in/

Rajmata Smt. Devendra Kumari Singhdeo Government Medical College, Ambikapur (also known as Government Medical College, Ambikapur) is a government medical college in Ambikapur, Chhattisgarh, India. It is affiliated to Pt. Deendayal Upadhyay Memorial Health Sciences and Ayush University of Chhattisgarh and imparts the degree Bachelor of Medicine and Surgery (MBBS), recognized by the National Medical Commission, with intake limited to 100 students per year.

== Overview ==
On 9 July 2021, the government medical college at Surguja, Ambikapur, India, was officially renamed the Rajmata Devendra Kumari Singh Deo Government Medical College. It was established in 2016. It is a full-fledged tertiary referral government medical college.

The college imparts the degree Bachelor of Medicine and Surgery (MBBS). The college is affiliated to Pt. Deendayal Upadhyay Memorial Health Sciences and Ayush University of Chhattisgarh and is recognized by the National Medical Commission. Undergraduate student intake is limited to 100 students per year. The selection to the college is done on the basis of merit through the National Eligibility and Entrance Test.

The hospital associated with the college is one of the largest hospitals in the Ambikapur.

== Academics ==
The college offers courses in anatomy, physiology, biochemistry, pathology, microbiology, forensic science and pharmacology. Nursing and para-medical courses are also offered.

== See also ==
- List of hospitals in India
