= GMERS Medical College and Hospital, Vadnagar =

Medical college in Vadnagar, Gujarat

- Type: Medical College and Hospital
- Established: 2017
- Address: Vadnagar, Gujarat, India
- Affiliations: Hemchandracharya North Gujarat University
- Website: http://gmersmchvadnagar.com/

GMERS Medical College and Hospital, Vadnagar, established in 2017, is a medical college situated in Vadnagar, Gujarat. The college imparts the degree Bachelor of Medicine and Surgery. The college is affiliated to Hemchandracharya North Gujarat University and is recognized by Medical Council of India. The hospital associated with the college is one of the largest hospitals in the Vadnagar. The selection of the college is done on the basis of merit through National Eligibility and Entrance Test. Yearly undergraduate student intake is currently 200. In 2017, the Ministry of Health and Family Welfare allotted 150 seats for the first year.

== Courses ==
GAMERS Medical College and Hospital, Vadnagar undertakes education and training of students MBBS courses. This college is offering 200 MBBS seats from 2019 of which 85% Seats are of state quota and 15% is for Nation Counselling.

In October 2017, prime minister Narendra Modi inaugurated the Innovative Mobile Phone Technology for Community Health Operation (ImTeCHO) which aims to improve the coverage of community-based maternal, neonatal and infant health services.

=== Capacity ===
The Medical College hospital has 400 beds and the outpatient department handles around 1000 patients everyday.
