= Sri Devaraj Urs Academy of Higher Education and Research =

Deemed university in Karnataka, India

- Type: Deemed university
- Established: 1986
- Chancellor: G. H. Nagaraja
- Vice-Chancellor: Dr. B. Vengamma
- Academic staff: 312 (2022)
- Administrative staff: 1139 non-teaching (2022); 79 technical (2022)
- Students: 1712 (2022)
- Location: Kolar, Karnataka, India
- Website: sduaher.ac.in

Sri Devaraj Urs Academy of Higher Education and Research, formerly Sri Devaraj Urs University, is a deemed university located in Kolar, Karnataka, India. It was established as Sri Devaraj Urs Medical College in 1986 by the Sri Devaraj Urs Educational Trust. It was conferred deemed-to-be-university status under Section 3 of UGC Act 1956 on 25 May 2007.

== History ==
The Medical Council of India granted recognition for the undergraduate course in its very first Inspection in 1992. Postgraduate degree courses and diploma courses are being offered since 1997 in various clinical, pre- and paraclinical courses, and the degrees awarded are recognized by Medical Council of India.

The trust has obtained Accreditation by National Assessment and Accreditation Council (NAAC, INDIA) and certification by ISO 9001–2000 in the year 2006 for its medical college. Sri Devaraj Urs Medical College is one of the few medical colleges in India to have achieved this.

A fully integrated, modular curriculum within the regulation of Medical Council of India is under preparation. They are also taught Medical Ethics and the Constitution of India.

The college maintains high standard in teaching, training and evaluation processes as evidenced by the high pass percentage with a substantial number of students securing gold medals/distinctions/first classes, in the university examinations.

== RL Jalappa Hospital and Research Centre ==
Sri Devaraj Urs University has a 1200-bed teaching hospital to accommodate the clinical teaching requirements of undergraduate and postgraduate medical students. Its design is hexagonal and is situated in the college campus.

The hospital has departments in all specialties. Each department has its own seminar hall and examination rooms in the OPD. Each specialty has male and female wards, with bed strength as per MCI requirements with attached laboratories.

== Admission policy ==
Admissions to undergraduate and postgraduate courses are based on merit obtained in the entrance test conducted on an all-India basis. 85% of the seats are reserved for general merit candidates. 15% of the seats are reserved for NRI / NRI sponsored and foreign nationals.

== Courses offered ==
Sri Devaraj Urs Medical College and R. L. Jalappa Hospital & Research Centre
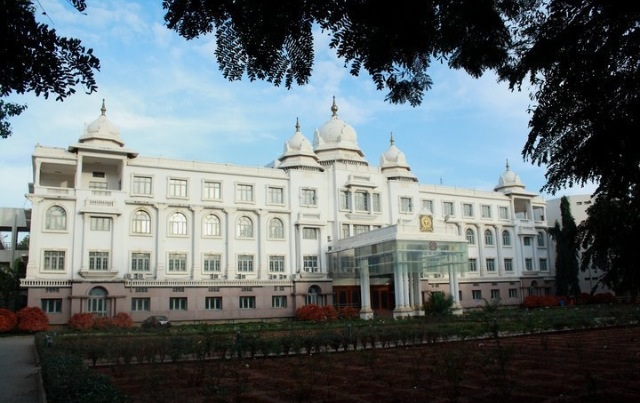
- Type: Constituent college
- Established: 1986
- Academic affiliations: Sri Devaraj Urs Academy of Higher Education and Research
- President: G. H. Nagaraja
- Principal: Dr. K. Prabhakar
- Location: Kolar, Karnataka, India
- Website: sdumc.ac.in

=== Undergraduate Courses ===
MBBS

=== Postgraduate courses ===
Sri Devaraj Urs Medical College, the constituent college of the university, offers postgraduate courses in 15 subjects. Doctor of Medicine (M.D) courses in Medicine, Pediatrics, Radio-Diagnosis, Dermatology, Anesthesiology, Physiology, Pathology, Forensic Medicine, Pharmacology, Microbiology, Biochemistry and Master of Surgery (M.S) courses in Surgery, Orthopedics, Obstetrics, Gynecology, Otorhinolaryngology and Ophthalmology

=== Proposed courses ===
- Ph.D. in biochemistry
- Ph.D. in microbiology
- Fellowship in head and neck onco-surgery
