= Swami Rama Himalayan University =

Private university in Uttarakhand, India

- Type: Private
- Established: May 12, 2013
- Accreditation: NAAC
- Affiliations: UGC, NMC, Indian Nursing Council
- President: Vijay Dhasmana
- Location: Dehradun, Uttarakhand, India; 30°11′50″N 78°10′05″E
- Campus: Suburban
- Website: srhu.edu.in

Swami Rama Himalayan University (SRHU) is a private university in Dehradun, Uttarakhand, India. The Himalayan Institute Hospital Trust founded the university in 2013, expanding on the academic and clinical program it operated at the Himalayan Institute of Medical Sciences since 1995. The university is named after Indian yogi Dr. Swami Rama.

== History ==
Swami Rama Himalayan University expanded on the more than thirty years of the academic and clinical program at the Himalayan Institute of Medical Sciences, established in 1995. In April 2012, a proposal for establishing a separate university was put before the Government of Uttarakhand by Himalayan Institute Hospital Trust. In December 2012, the Uttarakhand Legislative Assembly passed the 'Himalayan University Bill, 2012' and in February 2013 it became an Act through the assent of Governor of Uttarakhand as Himalayan University Act, 2012.

Swami Rama Himalayan University was officially formed on May 12, 2013. The university was named for Indian yogi Swami Rama, who founded the Himalayan Institute Hospital Trust in 1989.

In 2024, the university signed a memorandum of understanding for collaborative research and researcher and student exchange with the University of Tsukuba in Japan. At its eighth convocation in February 2026, the university graduated 1,001 students.

== Campus ==
Swami Rama Himalayan University is located in Jolly Grant in the Dehradun district of Uttarakhand, India. It is a residential campus that includes the Ayurveda Centre, the Rural Development Institute, and the Himalayan Hospital, the teaching hosptial for medical and health sciences programs. It also includes the Sadhana Mandir Ashram, the facility for students of yogic and ancient medical practices. The campus has more than 110 teaching and research laboratories.

== Academics ==
=== Programs ===
Swami Rama Himalayan University offers more than ninety undergraduate, postgraduate, and doctoral degrees. It has seven academic schools and institutes, listed below. The university started a Centre for Distance and Online Education in 2026.

==== Allied and Healthcare ====
The university's Allied and Healthcare program offers a Bachelor of anaesthesia and operation theatre technology, audiology and speech language pathology, medical laboratory sciences, medical radiology and imaging technology, optometry, physiotherapy, and radiation therapy technology. Its postgraduate program includes a Master of hospital administration, laboratory science, physiotherapy, statistics (data science and health analytics), and social work; a Postgraduate Diploma in clinical psychology; a M.Sc. in clinical research, epidemiology, medical anatomy, medical biochemistry, medical microbiology, medical pharmacology, medical physics, and medical physiology.

==== Himalayan College of Nursing ====
The Himalayan College of Nursing offers a B.Sc, Post B.Sc., M.Sc., and Ph.D in nursing and a Nurse Practitioner in Critical Care (NPCC).

==== Himalayan Institute of Medical Sciences ====
The Himalayan Institute of Medical Sciences offers undergraduate degrees in MBBS and a General Duty Assistant (GDA). Its postgraduate offerings include an MD-MS in anaesthesiology, anatomy, biochemistry, community medicine, dermatology, emergency medicine, general medicine, general surgery, immunohaematology, microbiology, obstetrics and gynecology, ophthalmology, orthopaedics, otorhinolaryngology, pathology, pediatrics, pharmacology,hysiology, psychiatry, radiation oncology, radio diagnosis, and respiratory medicine; a D.M. in cardiology, critical care medicine, neonatology, and neruology; and a M.Ch. in cardiology, neurosurgery, surgical oncology, and urology. The program also offers a Ph.D. in cancer biology/cancer medicine, clinical psychology, clinical research, epidemiology, hospital administration, immunology, medical biochemistry, medical physics, microbiology, physiology, and psychology.

==== Himalayan School of Bio Sciences ====
The Himalayan School of Bio Sciences offers three B.Sc. programs: microbiology, biotechnology, and food science and technology. Its post-graduate programs include an M.Sc. in biochemistry, biotechnology, environmental sciences, microbiology, and pharmaceutical chemistry, and a Ph.D. in biochemistry and biotechnology.

==== Himalayan School of Management Studies ====
The Himalayan School of Management Studies offers a Bachelor of commerce honors (B.Com.), a BBA and MBA in business administration, a BBA in tourism and wellness, and a Ph.D. in management (finance, human resource, marketing).

==== Himalayan School of Pharmaceutical Sciences ====
The Himalayan School of Pharmaceutical Sciences offers a Bachelor of pharmacy and a Ph.D. in pharmacy and pharmacology.

==== Himalayan School of Science and Technology ====
Himalayan School of Science and Technology offers a B.Sc. in data science, a B.Sc. and B.Des in visual effects and gaming, a bachelor of computer applications (BCA), a B.Tech. in electronics and communitions engineering, a B.Tech. and M.Tech. in computer science and engineering, a MCA in computer applications, and a Ph.D. in computer science.

==== Himalayan School of Yoga Sciences ====
The Himalayan School of Yoga Sciences continues yogic and traditional medicine practices of Swami Rama. It offers a B.Sc. and M.Sc. in yoga science and holistic health, an M.Sc. in yoga therapy, and a Ph.D. in yoga sciences.

=== Accreditation ===
Swami Rama Himalayan University is accredited by the National Assessment and Accreditation Council (NAAC), receiving an A+ rating in 2024.

=== Rankings ===
In 2026, Times Higher Education World University Rankings ranked Swami Rama Himalayan University in the 201-300th class. The Indian Ministry of Education's National Institutional Ranking Framework (NIRF) rated the university in the 101-150 rank band in 2025.

== Faculty ==
Dr. Vijay Dhasmana is the president of Swami Rama Himalayan University.

== Notable alumni ==
- Shourya Saini, sports shooter, winner of the bronze medal at the 2021 Summer Deaflympics.

== See also ==
- Dehradun
