= Pandit Bhagwat Dayal Sharma University of Health Sciences =

State university in Rohtak, Haryana, India

- Type: Public
- Established: 2008; 18 years ago
- Affiliations: UGC
- Chancellor: Governor of Haryana
- Vice-Chancellor: Dr. H. K. Aggarwal
- Location: Rohtak, Haryana, India; 28.884793°N 76.6085837°E
- Website: uhsr.ac.in

Pandit Bhagwat Dayal Sharma University of Health Sciences (PBDSUHS) is a state university located at Rohtak, Haryana, India.

== About ==
It was established in 2008 by Pandit Bhagwat Dayal Sharma University of Health Sciences Rohtak Act, 2008 of the Government of Haryana, amended in 2008, 2009, 2010 and 2011. The university incorporates PGIMS Rohtak, as well as Postgraduate Institute of Dental Sciences, and several other colleges, and affiliates medical colleges, dental colleges, physiotherapy colleges, Ayurvedic colleges, homoeopathic colleges and pharmacy colleges in Haryana.

== Rankings ==
University and college rankings

Medical – India
- NIRF (2024): 50

The university was ranked 50th among medical colleges in India by the National Institutional Ranking Framework in 2024.

== See also ==
- List of medical colleges in Haryana
