= Madhya Pradesh Medical Science University =

State University in Madhya Pradesh

- Type: State university
- Established: 2011; 15 years ago
- Academic affiliations: UGC
- Chancellor: Governor of Madhya Pradesh
- Vice-Chancellor: Dr. Ashok Khandelwal
- Location: Jabalpur, Madhya Pradesh, India; 23.150°N 79.879°E
- Website: www.mpmsu.edu.in

Madhya Pradesh Medical Science University (MPMSU), also known as Madhya Pradesh Ayurvigyan Vishwavidyalaya, is a state university located at Jabalpur, Madhya Pradesh, India. It was established in 2011 by the Government of Madhya Pradesh and has jurisdiction over all medical, dental, nursing, paramedical, Ayurveda, homeopathic, Unani, and Yoga colleges in Madhya Pradesh. It has about 300 affiliated colleges and a yearly intake of 80,000 students.
