= M. C. Pant =

Indian radiation oncologist

- Born: 11 October 1956; Kunkoli, Ranikhet, Uttarakhand, India
- Died: 13 August 2015 (aged 58); Lucknow, Uttar Pradesh, India
- Other name: Mohan Chandra Pant
- Education: Kumaon University; King George's Medical University
- Occupation: Radiation oncologist
- Years active: 1985–2015
- Known for: Radiotherapy
- Spouse: Nirmala Pant
- Children: One son and one daughter
- Awards: Padma Shri; B. C. Roy National Award; Hukum Chand Jain Memorial Award; P. K. Haldar Memorial Award; Dr. Birbal Sahni Award; Professor K. B. Kunwar Memorial Award; IRIA Prasad Memorial Award; UICC International Cancer Technology Transfer Award; Rotary Best Social Worker Award

Mohan Chandra Pant (1956–2015) was an Indian radiation oncologist, institution builder and the founder vice chancellor of the H. N. B. Uttarakhand Medical Education University, Dehradun. He served as the director of Dr. Ram Manohar Lohia Institute of Medical Sciences, Lucknow, and was the dean and head of the Radiotherapy Department at the King George's Medical University at the time of his death. He received the Dr. B. C. Roy Award, the highest Indian award in the medical category, from the Medical Council of India in 2005. The Government of India awarded him the fourth highest civilian honour of the Padma Shri, in 2008, for his contributions to medicine.

== Biography ==
Mohan Chandra Pant was born at Kunkoli, a small village in Ranikhet in the undivided Uttar Pradesh (presently in Uttarakhand) in a family with limited financial means. His early schooling was at the local village school, after which he graduated in science (BSc) from Kumaon University in 1974, and continued his studies at King George's Medical University (KGMU) from where he obtained his MBBS in 1979 and MD in 1985. His career started as a member of faculty at his alma mater, but moved to Tokyo in 1986 for advanced training in CT Scan at the University of Tokyo. Returning to India, he joined KGMU and established a CT Scan unit at the institution, the first such unit in the public sector in the state. He also had training in Magnetic resonance imaging techniques in Germany and radiation oncology at the Union for International Cancer Control, Geneva, California State University, Long Beach, University of Texas MD Anderson Cancer Center and Rush University. Chicago. He became the director of the Department of Radiotherapy at KGMU in 2007 and held the post till 2010. In September 2010, he moved to Dr. Ram Manohar Lohia Institute of Medical Sciences, Lucknow, as its director, where he worked for three years till September 2013. Thereafter, he was associated with the establishment of H.N.B. Uttarakhand Medical Education University at Dehradun and when institution became operational in 2014, he was appointed as its founding vice chancellor. Returning to KGMU, he served as the dean and head of the Radiotherapy Department at the institution. During brief interludes, he served as a visiting professor at Tokyo University, Rush University, California University, University of Texas MD Anderson Cancer Center, Dichin Barge University, Germany, Chinese University of Hong Kong, and Roswell Park Comprehensive Cancer Center.

Pant was married to Nirmala Pant, the director of Lucknow Cancer Institute, and the couple had a son and a daughter. He died on 13 August 2015, at Lucknow Cancer Institute, succumbing to liver cancer for which he was under treatment for six months.

== Legacy ==
Besides setting up the first CT Scan unit in the non-private sector in the state of Uttar Pradesh at KGMU in the Eighties, Pant's contribution is reported behind the founding of several institutions. The Lucknow Cancer Institute, Lucknow, where eventually his death occurred in 2015, was one of the institutions he helped establish. His efforts have also helped in the establishment of the Swami Ram Memorial Cancer Hospital and Research Center and Dr. Susheela Tiwari Memorial Cancer Hospital and Research Center, both divisions of the Government Medical College, Haldwani, and Rural Cancer Hospital, Mainpuri, an institution under the H. N. B. Uttarakhand Medical Education University. It was during his tenure as the director, a High Dose Rate Brachytherapy (HDR-BT) unit and a radiotherapy simulator (Simulix Evolution, Nucletron) were installed at KGMU. While heading the Dr. Ram Manohar Lohia Institute of Medical Sciences, his efforts helped in the modernization of the hospital by installing several medical systems and equipment, including Lithotripsy, Cath Lab and Pathology & Cytopathology facilities web compatible digital X-ray system, 3 tesla MRI, 16 Slice CT-SIM with LASER positioning system, Multi-energy Elekta Infinity LINAC, mHDR (Ir-192) system for Brachytherapy, Mammography X-ray System, Photo Dynamic Therapy (PTD) and Single Photon Emission Computed tomography (SPECT-CT). The Cancer Indoor Ward, Out Patient Department (OPD–II), Microbiology Department, and High Dose Radioiodine ward were started functioning during his directorship.

Pant's involvement in the Cancer Control Programme in Uttarakhand has helped in the establishment of 10 cancer detection centres across the state. His researches, including the one on the genetic transformation due to tobacco use, have been documented by 89 medical papers published in national and international journals, 5 books and chapters in 5 other books. He was the organizer of a school-based cancer education project involving 297 teachers and around 60,000 students in 13 districts of the state and was also known to have delivered several keynote addresses and orations. He also contributed to the establishment of a Picture Gallery, covering the 100 years of history of the King George's Medical University, in connection with the centenary celebrations of the institution.

== Awards and honours ==
Pant, who was listed among 20 Great Indians by India Today and an elected fellow of the National Academy of Medical Sciences, was a recipient of the P. K. Haldar Memorial Award (1990) and Hukum Chand Jain Memorial Award (2003). The Medical Council of India awarded him the highest Indian medical award of Dr. B. C. Roy Award in 2005. The Government of India included him the 2008 Republic Day honours list for the civilian honour of the Padma Shri. The same year, Kumaon University, his alma mater, awarded him the degree of Doctor of Science (honoris causa). He was also a recipient of awards such as Professor K. B. Kunwar Memorial Award (1986, 88 and 89), Prasad Memorial Award of the Indian Radiology and Imaging Association (1987), International Cancer Technology Transfer Award of the Union for International Cancer Control (1993), Best Social Worker Award of the Lucknow chapter of the Rotary International (2001) and Dr. Birbal Sahni Award (2008).
