= St. Mary's Convent High School, Nainital =

Coordinates: 29.38°N 79.45°E

St. Mary's Convent High School
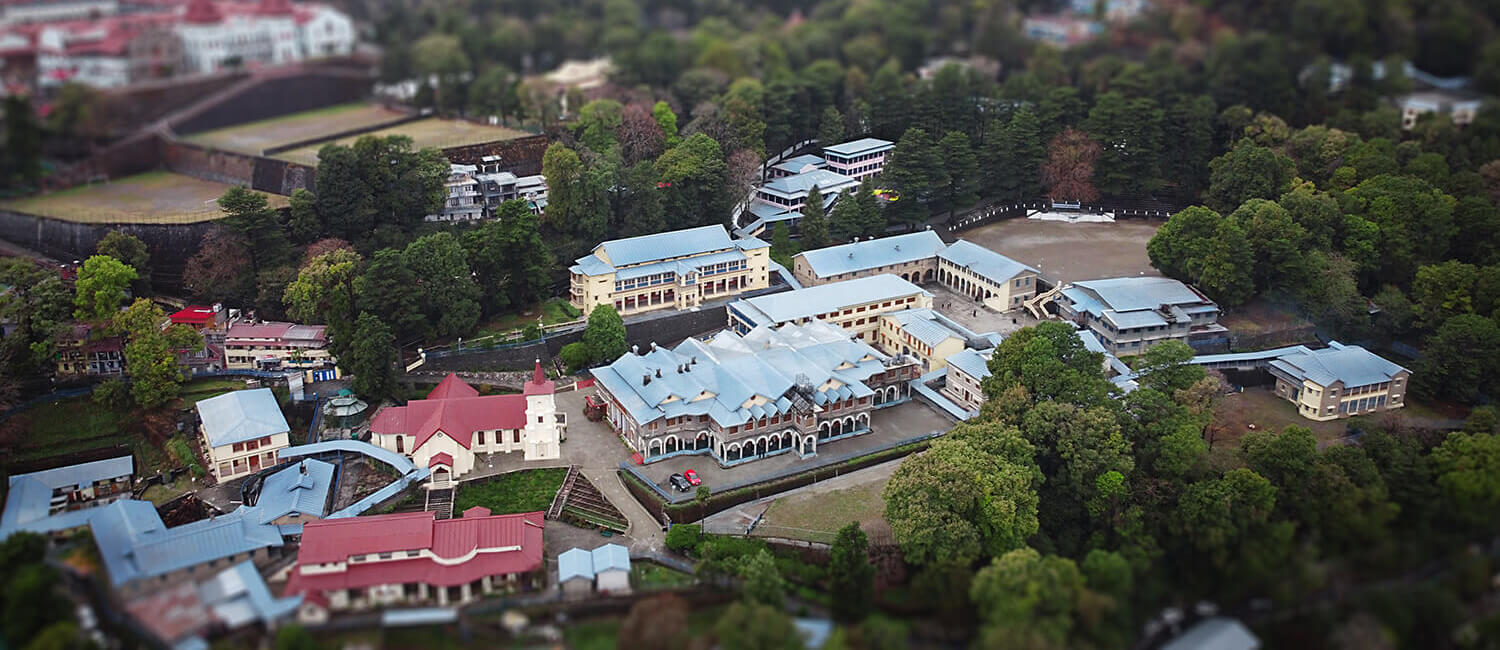
- Ramnee Park, Nainital, Uttarakhand; Nainital, Kumaon, 263002; India

Information
- Type: Convent
- Established: 1878; 148 years ago
- Gender: All Girls
- Website: http://www.ramneentl.org/

St. Mary's Convent College, often informally referred to simply as Ramnee, is an all-girls boarding school located in Nainital, Kumaon, Uttarakhand at an altitude of 2,000 metres (6,600 ft) above MSL amidst the Kumaon Hills, that provides private school education to girls from prep. grades to XII under the ICSE board. The school was also, in discontinued usage, referred to as "Sonn". Students and alumnae are known colloquially as "Ramneeites".

== History ==
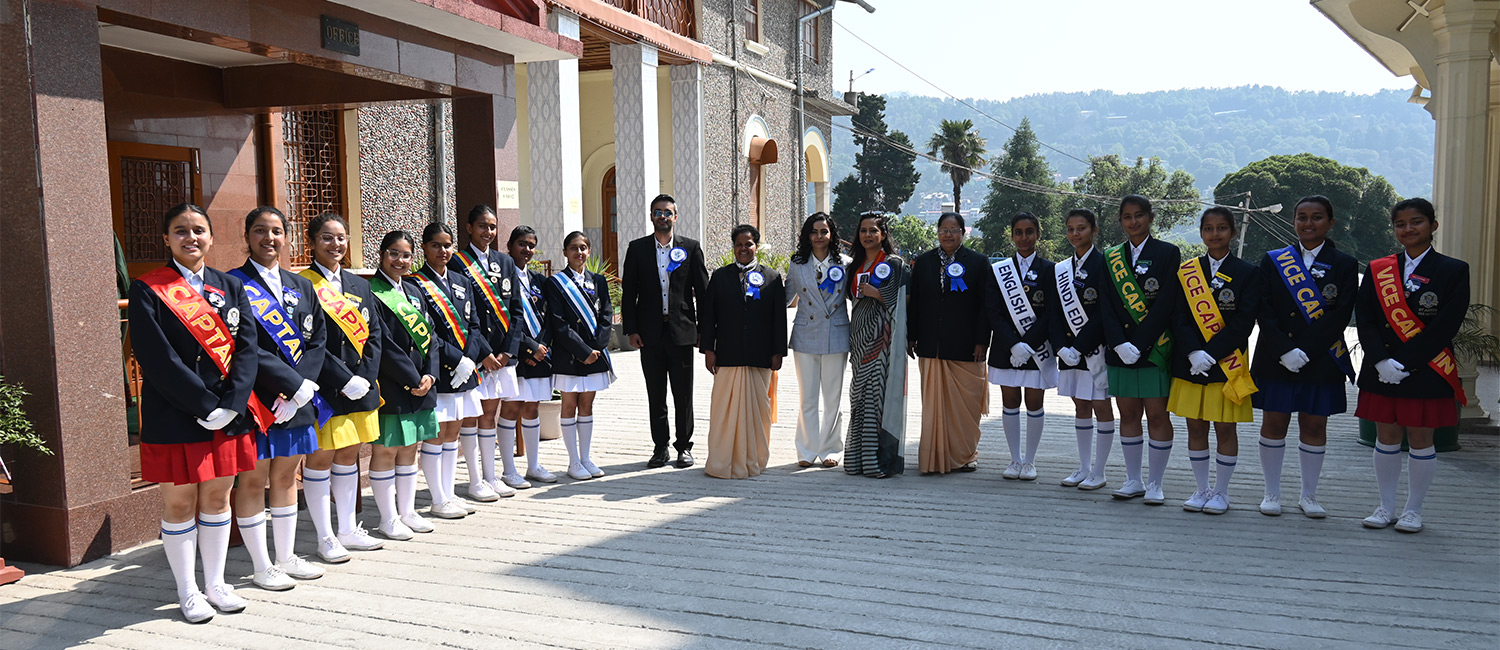
St Mary's Convent School Students and Faculties

Established by Mother Salesia Reiner in 1878, St. Mary's Convent is a Roman Catholic institution superintended by Sisters belonging to the CJ (Congregation of Jesus) order founded as Institute of the Blessed Virgin Mary (until 2003), by Mother Mary Ward, an English lady, in the 17th century. The sisters of this Congregation started working in Patna, Bihar in 1853. Mother Salesia Reiner, then Mother Superior of St. Joseph's Convent Patna, opened a foundation in Nainital.

Nainital was the summer capital of the North Western Provinces and during the summer was frequented by tourists as well as civil and military officials. The presence of the sisters made education more convenient for both the local people and regular visitors. After overcoming the initial difficulties, a team of 8 sisters started a school with a few day-scholars in the month of May 1878. By the end of the year, the school had 40 boarders and a number of day-scholars.

== Sports and activities ==
Basketball, volleyball and badminton are the principal games. A wide range of cultural and co-curricular activities are available, such as the martial art Muay Thai. Each student takes part in the annual sports event which generally takes place in May. Traditionally, the school has four houses:

House Name	Colour	Motto
St. Anne	Green	Honour not honours
St. Agnes	Red	True to the End
St. Catherine	Yellow	Perseverance conquers All
St. Theresa	Blue	Scale the Heights

== Notable alumni ==
- Meera Shankar, former Ambassador of India to the United States
- Meenakshi Sargogi, Sugar Industrialist and Padma Shri Awardee
- Nuzhat Husain, former director of Dr. Ram Manohar Lohia Institute of Medical Sciences
- Sukirti Kandpal (actress)
- Shazia Ilmi (Indian Politician)
- Anku Pande (Film Producer)
- Vandana Shiva (Indian activist)
