= Shazia Ilmi =

Indian politician (born 1970)

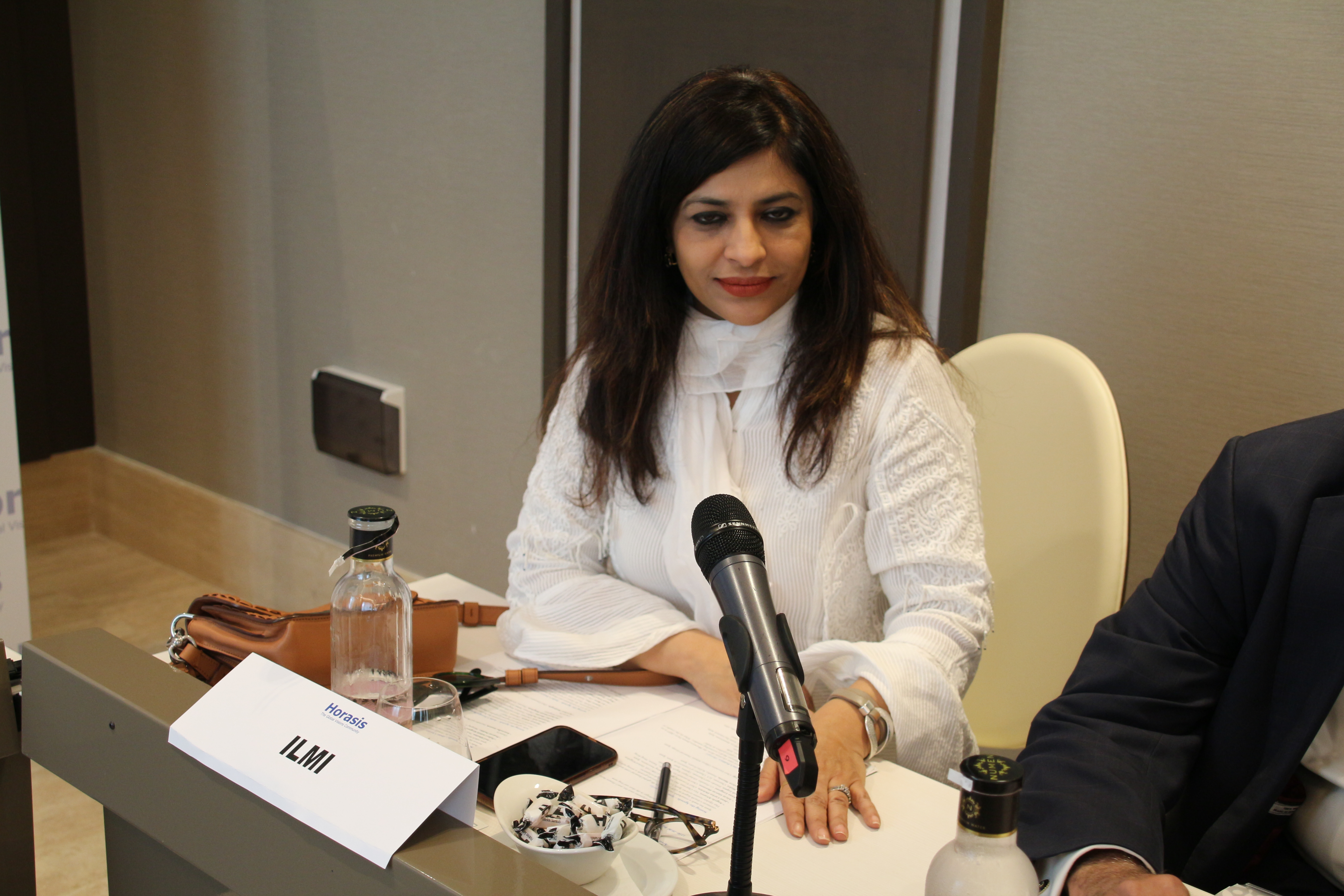

Spokesperson of Bharatiya Janata Party
- Incumbent
- Assumed office 2015

Spokesperson of India Against Corruption
- In office 2011–2012

Personal details
- Born: 2 April 1970 (age 56) Kanpur, Uttar Pradesh, India
- Party: Bharatiya Janata Party (2015– present)
- Other political affiliations: Aam Aadmi Party (2011-2014)
- Spouse: Sajid Malik
- Relations: Reshma Arif (sister)
- Education: St. Bedes College, Shimla
- Occupation: Social Activist, Journalist, Politician

Shazia Ilmi (born 2 April 1970) is an Indian politician and the national spokesperson of the Bharatiya Janata Party since July 2021.

Before joining politics, Ilmi was a television journalist and anchor at Star News, where she led a media campaign for an anti-corruption bill (to institute an ombudsman popularly known as the Jan Lokpal Bill). She started her political career with the Aam Aadmi Party and was a member of its National Executive before she left the party in May 2014 and joined the Bharatiya Janata Party in January 2015.

== Early life ==
Ilmi comes from a middle-class Kanpur-based Muslim family with links to the Indian National Congress political party. Her father, Maulana Ishaq Ilmi, was the founder and editor of Siyasat Jadid, a Kanpur-based Urdu newspaper.

Ilmi was educated at St. Mary's Convent High School in Kanpur and Nainital and then at St. Bede's College, Shimla. She then completed degree courses in journalism and broadcasting at Jamia Millia Islamia and the University of Wales, Cardiff, and also completed a diploma in 16mm film production at New York Film Academy.

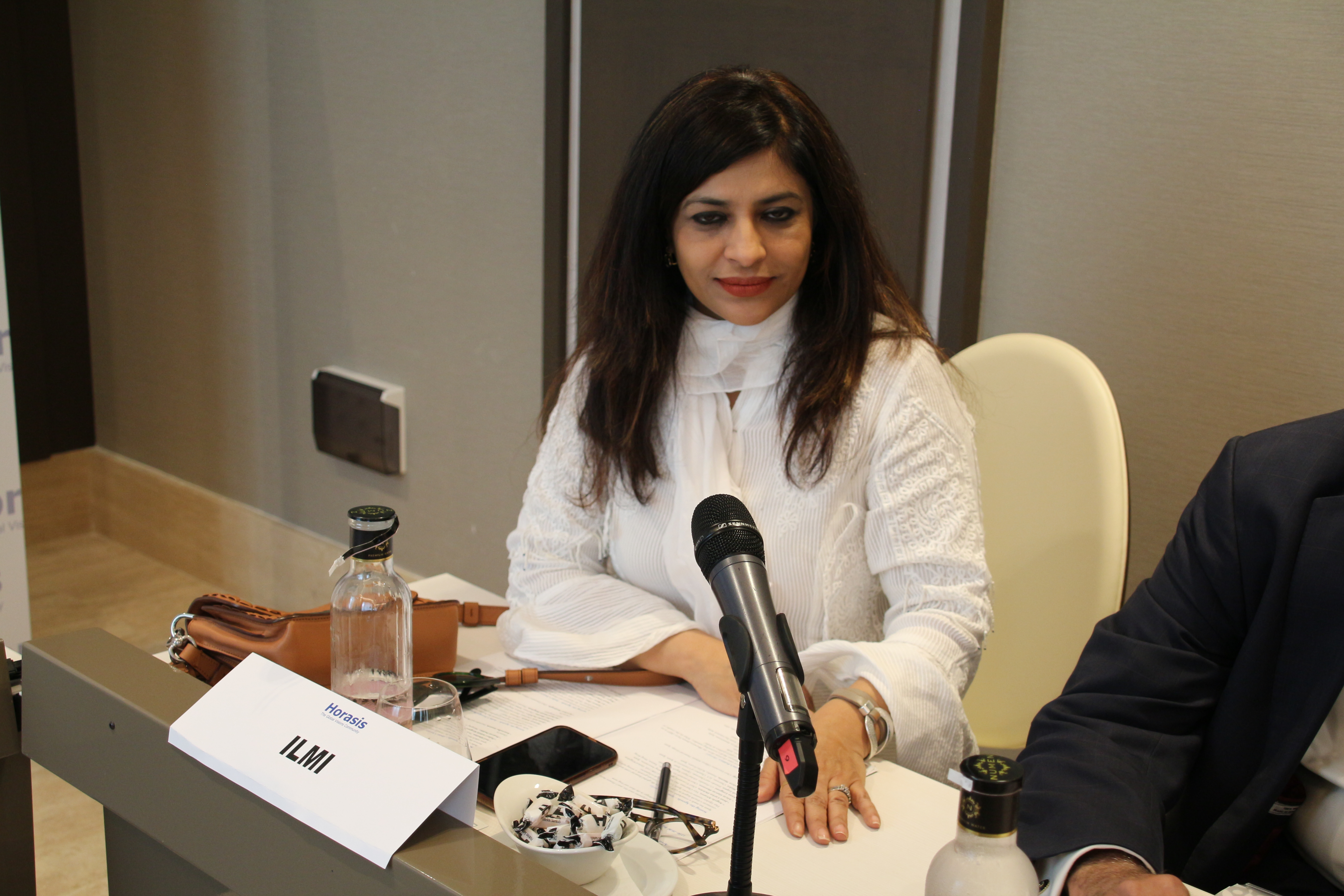
Ilmi in 2018

Her brother Aijaz Ilmi is a member and spokesperson of the Bharatiya Janata Party. Her sister is married to Arif Mohammed Khan, a former Indian National Congress politician and Union Minister, who is currently the Governor of Bihar. Shazia Ilmi is married to Sajid Malik.

== Television career ==
Ilmi spent 15 years in varied aspects of television news and documentary production. She has been an anchor on Star News, where she hosted and produced the popular prime time news show Desh Videsh.

Ilmi has been a member of the International Association of Women in Radio and Television. Her film titled Post Box. 418 Siyasat Kanpur, concerning the struggle for survival of an Urdu language newspaper, was screened at the IAWRT film festival in 2011 and also at events such as a similar festival in Kerala. She was also a co-director, with Radha Hola, of a 1996 documentary concerning the eco-feminist Vandana Shiva. This film, called Daughter of the Earth — Portrait of Vandana Shiva, has been shown by various television broadcasters, including the Discovery Channel.

== Political career ==
In 2011, Shazia Ilmi joined the anti-corruption campaign, that was being led by Anna Hazare, and became the urbane, Muslim, media-savvy face of Team Anna.

After the Anna Hazare campaign ended, she joined the Aam Aadmi Party, and became a member of its National Executive. Ilmi, along with some other AAP leaders, was briefly involved in a controversy over malpractices in fund-collection, though the allegations were never proven. She contested the Lok Sabha elections, 2014 for the AAP from Ghaziabad but lost to V. K. Singh. Having been unhappy with the party's leadership, she resigned her AAP party membership on 24 May 2014.

Ilmi joined the BJP on 16 January 2015 along with IPS Officer Kiran Bedi in a felicitation ceremony at the Delhi BJP office, just before the upcoming 2015 Delhi Assembly elections. She was appointed as a national spokesperson of the Bharatiya Janata Party in July 2021.

In September 2022, she moved the Supreme Court of India seeking direction to the Central government to establish a consistent and universal code for granting alimony and maintenance (Child support), aiming to eliminate obstacles.

== Other activities ==
In January 2017, Ilmi was appointed the additional director (non-official part-time independent) of Engineers India Ltd (EIL) from 27 March 2017 to 30 January 2020.
