= Soniya Nityanand =

Vice Chancellor of King George's Medical University, Lucknow

- Born: 6 September 1962 (age 63); Lucknow, Uttar Pradesh, India
- Education: King George's Medical University; Karolinska Institute
- Known for: Research in immuno-hematology
- Awards: Padma Shri (2025); National Bioscience Award for Career Development (2003–04); INSA Young Scientist Award (1990); Dr. J.C. Patel and Dr. B.C. Mehta Award (2000)
- Scientific career
- Fields: Immunology, Hematology
- Workplaces: Dr. Ram Manohar Lohia Institute of Medical Sciences; Sanjay Gandhi Postgraduate Institute of Medical Sciences; King George's Medical University

Soniya Nityanand (born 6 September 1962) is an Indian immunologist and hematologist. She is currently serving as the Vice Chancellor of the King George's Medical University, Lucknow. In 2025, she was awarded the Padma Shri, India's fourth-highest civilian award, for her contributions to medicine.

== Early life and education ==
Nityanand completed her MBBS and MD from King George's Medical College, Lucknow. She later obtained a PhD in Immunology from the Karolinska Institute in Stockholm, Sweden in 1996.

== Career ==
Nityanand began her academic career as an Assistant Professor of Medicine at King George's Medical College from October 1991 to November 1993. She then joined the Sanjay Gandhi Postgraduate Institute of Medical Sciences (SGPGIMS), where she has served in the Departments of Immunology and Hematology since November 1993.

She was also a visiting fellow in Immunology and Hematology at the Karolinska Institute, Stockholm, from 1991 to 1992.

In 2021, she was appointed as the Director of the Dr. Ram Manohar Lohia Institute of Medical Sciences.

In August 2023, Nityanand was appointed as the Vice-Chancellor of King George's Medical University, Lucknow, becoming only the second woman to hold the post.

== Awards and honours ==
Nityanand has received several prestigious awards during her career:

- 2025: Padma Shri in Medicine
- National Bioscience Award for Career Development (2003–04) by the Department of Biotechnology
- Young Scientist Award (1990) by the Indian National Science Academy
- Dr. J.C. Patel and Dr. B.C. Mehta Award by the Association of Physicians of India (2000)
- Dr. N.N. Gupta Gold Medal
- Chancellor's Medal for the Best Medical Student
