= Shyam Swarup Agarwal =

Indian geneticist and immunologist

- Born: 5 July 1941; Bareilly, United Provinces, British India
- Died: 2 December 2013 (aged 72); Lucknow, Uttar Pradesh, India
- Education: University of Lucknow; King George’s Medical College; International Agency for Research on Cancer; Fox Chase Cancer Center
- Known for: Studies on Genetics and Molecular biology
- Awards: 1986 Shanti Swarup Bhatnagar Prize; 1986 ICMR Kamla Menon Research Award; 1999 Ranbaxy Research Award; 2000 GoUP Vigyan Ratna award
- Scientific career
- Fields: Internal Medicine; Genetics; Immunology
- Workplaces: King George's Medical University; SGPGI-MS; Tata Memorial Centre; Vivekananda Polyclinic and Institute of Medical Sciences
- Doctoral advisor: Baruch Samuel Blumberg

Shyam Swarup Agarwal (5 July 1941 – 2 December 2013) was an Indian geneticist, immunologist and the director of Sanjay Gandhi Postgraduate Institute of Medical Sciences (SGPGI-MS), Lucknow. A former director of the Advanced Center for Treatment, Research and Education in Cancer (ACTREC) at the Tata Memorial Centre, he was the pioneer of medical genetics and clinical immunology education in India. Known for his researches in the fields of genetics and molecular biology, he was an Emeritus Professor of the National Academy of Medical Sciences, and an elected fellow of all the three major Indian science academies, namely, the Indian Academy of Sciences, National Academy of Sciences, India, and the Indian National Science Academy. The Council of Scientific and Industrial Research, the apex agency of the Government of India for scientific research, awarded him the Shanti Swarup Bhatnagar Prize for Science and Technology, one of the highest Indian science awards for his contributions to Medical Sciences in 1986. (Note: Long link - please select award year to see details)

== Biography ==
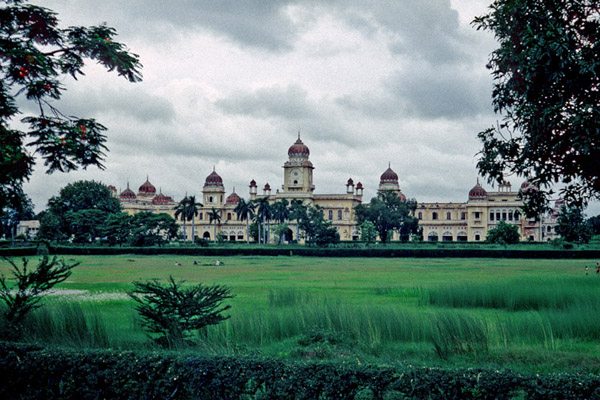
Lucknow University – Old campus

Shyam Swarup Agarwal was born on 5 July 1941 in Bareilly, an industrial city in the Indian state of Uttar Pradesh to Shyam Dulari and Satya Swarup Agrawal. His undergraduate studies were at Caning College of Lucknow University and he completed the course in 1958. Subsequently, he pursued a medical profession after earning an honors degree of MBBS from King George’s Medical College (present-day King George's Medical University) in 1963, passing the examination winning the Chancellor's Gold Medal for Best Student and the Hewitt Gold Medal for securing first rank. He continued at KGMU for his MD which he completed in 1967 and moved to the US for his post-doctoral studies on an International Agency for Research on Cancer fellowship where he worked at the laboratory of Baruch Samuel Blumberg at Fox Chase Cancer Center. (Note: Baruch Samuel Blumberg won the Nobel Prize in Physiology or Medicine in 1976.) On his return to India in 1970, he joined his alma mater, KGMU, as a lecturer and served the institution till 1986 during which time he secured an FRCS from the Royal College of Physicians and Surgeons of Canada in 1976. In 1986, he was invited by Sanjay Gandhi Postgraduate Institute of Medical Sciences (SGPGI-MS) to establish a department for medical genetics and clinical immunology. He headed the department as a professor and served as its director during two terms, 1993–97 and 2000–01. He superannuated from regular service in 2001 but continued his work by joining Tata Memorial Centre as the director of the newly established Advanced Center for Treatment, Research and Education in Cancer (ACTREC). After three years of service, he moved out of Tata Memorial Centre in 2004 and was appointed as an adviser at the Central Drug Research Institute. Simultaneously, he worked as an honorary director of Research and Academics at the Vivekanand Polyclinic and Institute of Medical Sciences and was a Senior Scientist of the Indian National Science Academy from 2006 onwards. He was also associated with Future Earth, a non-governmental organization creating ecological awareness among people and served as an independent director of Regency Hospital, Kanpur.

Agarwal was married to Pramila Das, a pathologist by profession, and the couple had a daughter, Rama and a son, Rahul. Agarwal died in Lucknow of a heart attack on 2 December 2013, at the age of 72.

== Legacy ==
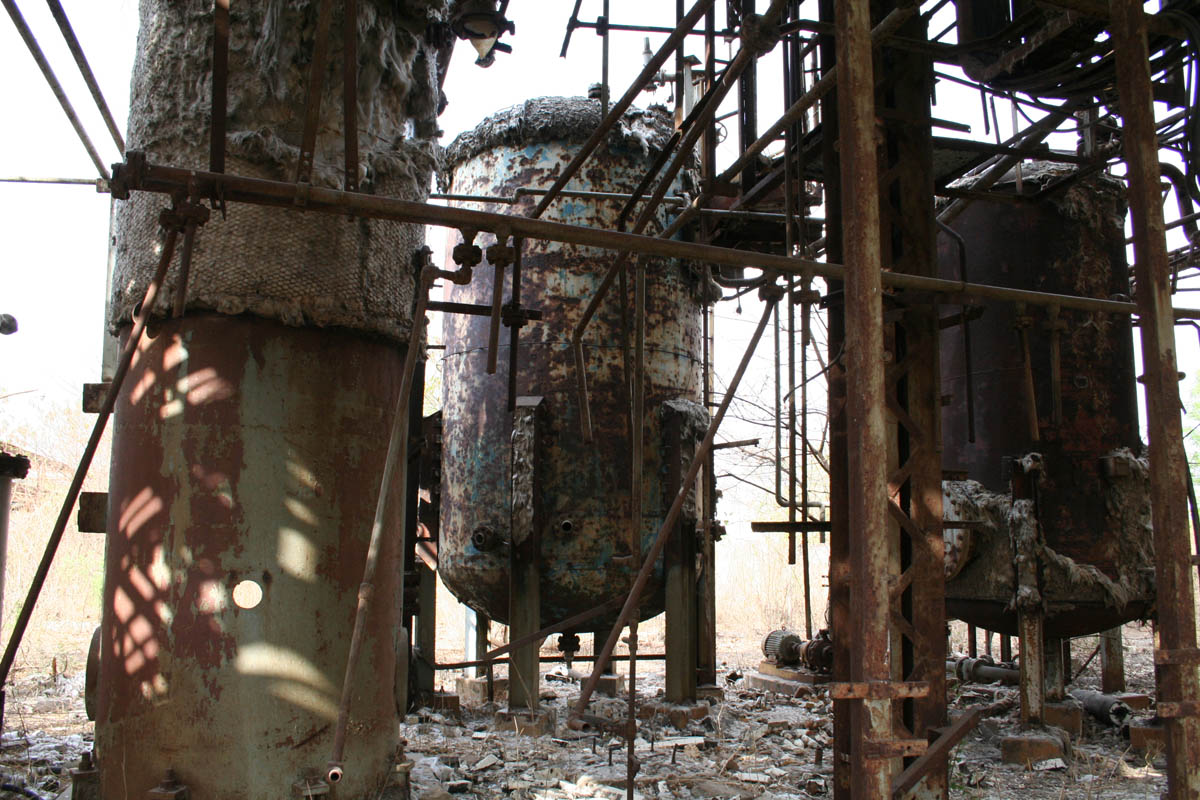
An image of Methyl isocyanate tanks at Union Carbide factory – 2008 photo

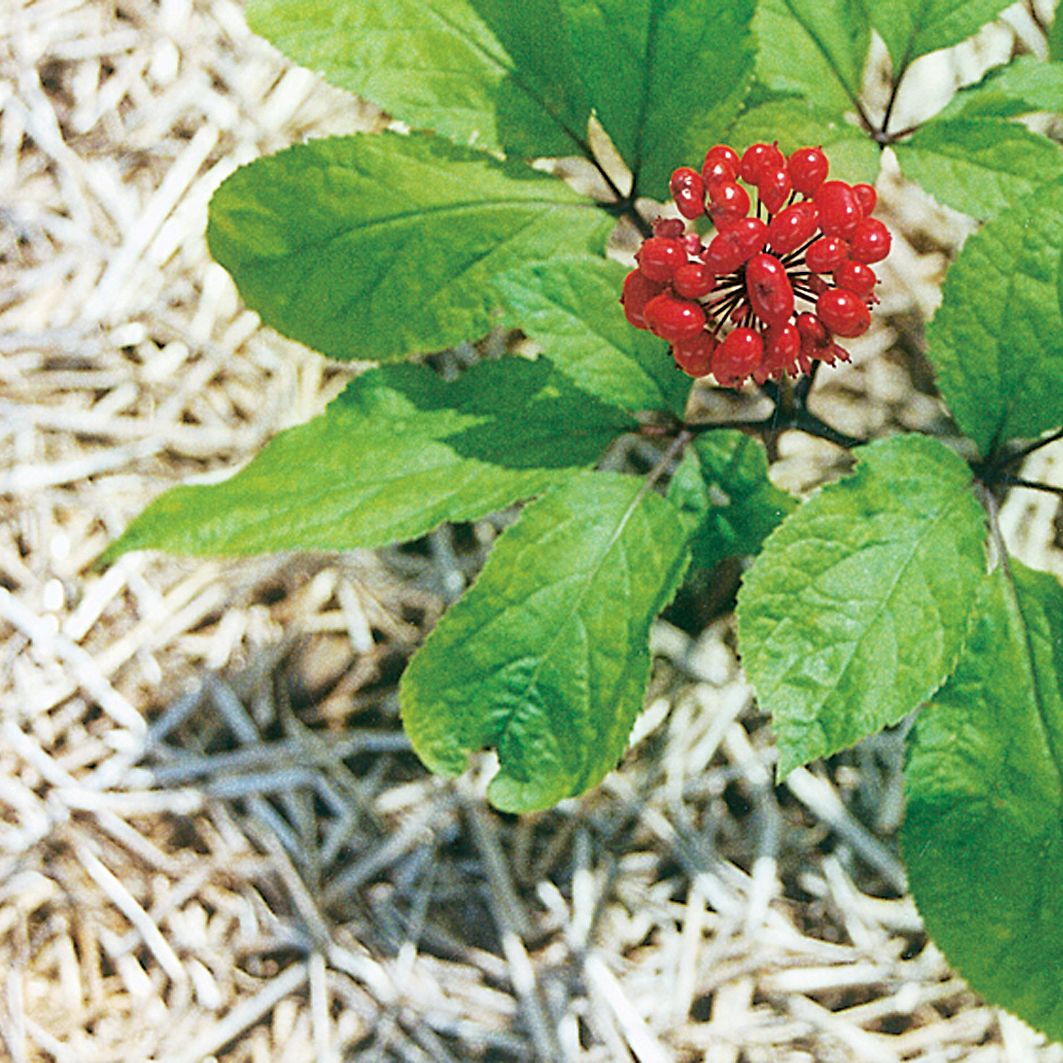
Panax ginseng

Agarwal's researches spanned the fields of medical genetics and molecular biology. His early studies during his days at Fox Chase Cancer Center were focused on DNA polymerase and its role in DNA synthesis which elucidated its stability and as well as the mechanism of DNA repair. In 1984, Agarwal and his colleagues conducted studies on Panax ginseng and their work discovered the immunomodulatory properties of the plant which they revealed in an article, Immunomodulatory activity of Panax ginseng extract, published in Planta Medica journal in December, the same year. Researches on the seroepidemiology of malaria, childhood cirrhosis and its polygenic inheritance and antenatal screening for thalassemia incidence were some of the other studies undertaken by him.

Under the aegis of the Department of Clinical Immunology of SGPGI-MS, he undertook several projects of the Indian Council of Medical Research which included a study of the genetic effects in the wake of the Bhopal Gas Tragedy of December 1984 (Note: Bhopal disaster is known to be the worst industrial tragedy and the estimated death toll is over 3000.) and a study of Handigodu syndrome prevalent in some parts of Karnataka which he identified as autosomal-dominant spondylo-epiphyseal dysplasia. He also undertook a task for Central Drug Research Institute (CDRI) when the institute developed Guggulipid, a hypolipidaemic agent produced from the Ayurvedic drug, guggul. He completed the clinical trials for the phytopharmaceutical preparation which was subsequently cleared by the Drug Controller General of India for commercial marketing.

His researches have been documented by way of several articles in peer-reviewed journals; (Note: Please see Selected bibliography section) the online article repository of the Indian Academy of Sciences has listed 171 of them. Besides, he has also contributed chapters to books published by others, and his work has been cited by a number of authors and researchers. He also edited the Medical Genetics section of the API Textbook of Medicine (Ninth Edition, Two Volume Set) and wrote the introduction to the section. On the academic front, he was a member of the expert panel set up by the Government of Uttar Pradesh for planning and establishment of Sanjay Gandhi Postgraduate Institute of Medical Sciences and when the institution was started in 1986, he became the founder head of the Department of Medical Genetics and Clinical Immunology. His contributions were reported in the introduction of the first DM post-graduate programme in medical genetics in India when the course was introduced at SGPGI-MS in 1990. He was responsible for the establishment of the Department of Clinical Immunology at the institution and was also credited with efforts in establishing a Medical Genetics Unit at KGMU.

== Awards and honors ==
The Council of Scientific and Industrial Research awarded him Shanti Swarup Bhatnagar Prize, one of the highest Indian science awards in 1986; he received the Kamla Menon Research Award of the Indian Council of Medical Research the same year. The Government of Uttar Pradesh honored him with Vigyan Ratna Award in 2000. In between, the Indian Academy of Sciences elected him as their fellow in 1985 and he became an elected fellow of the Indian National Science Academy a decade later. A founder fellow of the Indian College of Physicians, he was an Emeritus Professor of the National Academy of Medical Sciences and an elected fellow of the National Academy of Sciences, India. He was also a recipient of the Ranbaxy Research Award (1999) and a life member of the Indian Institute of Immunology.

Agarwal delivered two award orations of the National Academy of Medical Sciences, namely, Glaxo Oration (1992) and Gen. Amir Chand Oration. He also delivered two lectures of the Indian Society of Hematology and Blood Transfusion; J. B. Chatterjee Memorial Oration (1993) and J. B. Parekh Memorial Oration as well as two orations of the Indian National Science Academy, the Jawaharlal Nehru Birth Centenary Lecture of 2003 and the Dr, T. S. Tirumurti Memorial Lecture of 2005. The other award orations delivered by him included Unichem lecture of the Association of Physicians of India (1979), M. P. Mehrotra Oration of the Association of Physicians of India, UP chapter (1981), Lajwanti Madan Oration of the Uttar Pradesh chapter of the Indian Medical Association (1985), C. R. Krishnamurthy Oration (1997), Mathur–Mehrotra Oration of Sarojini Naidu Medical College (1998) and Bhatia–Misra Oration of King George Medical University (2000). The Society for Indian Academy of Medical Genetics has instituted an annual award, Dr S S Agarwal Young Scientist Award, in his honor, to recognize excellence in research in medical genetics among young researchers.

== Selected bibliography ==
=== Books ===
- Munjal, Y. P.; Sharma, Surendra K (18 May 2012). Agarwal, S. S. (ed.). API Textbook of Medicine, Ninth Edition, Two Volume Set. JP Medical Ltd. pp. 169–. ISBN 978-93-5025-074-7.

=== Articles ===
- Singh, V.; Agarwal, S.; Gupta, B. (1984). "Immunomodulatory Activity of Panax ginseng Extract". Planta Medica. 50 (6): 462–465. doi:10.1055/s-2007-969773. ISSN 0032-0943. PMID 6531406. S2CID 31983884.
- Das, S K; Srivastava, I K; Dutta, G P; Agarwal, S S (1985). "Serology and seroepidemiology of malaria". Journal of Communicable Diseases. 17 (Supp. 1): 68–76. PMID 3831070.
- Gopal, K.; Saran, R. K.; Nityanand, S.; Gupta, P. P.; Hasan, M.; Das, S. K.; Sinha, N.; Agarwal, S. S. (April 1986). "Clinical trial of ethyl acetate extract of gum gugulu (gugulipid) in primary hyperlipidemia". The Journal of the Association of Physicians of India. 34 (4): 249–251. ISSN 0004-5772. PMID 3531151.
- Moitreyee, Chatterjee-Kishore; Suraksha, Agrawal; Swarup, Agarwal Shyam (1 January 1998). "Potential role of NF-kB and RXR beta like proteins in interferon induced HLA class I and beta globin gene transcription in K562 erythroleukaemia cells". Molecular and Cellular Biochemistry. 178 (1–2): 103–112. doi:10.1023/a:1006816806138. ISSN 0300-8177. PMID 9546588. S2CID 21008591.
- Deka, Ranjan; Shriver, Mark D.; Yu, Ling Mei; Heidreich, Elisa Mueller; Jin, Li; Zhong, Yixi; Mcgarvey, Stephen T.; Agarwal, Shyam Swarup; Bunker, Clareann H. (1 August 1999). "Genetic variation at twentythree microsatellite loci in sixteen human populations". Journal of Genetics. 78 (2): 99. doi:10.1007/bf02924561. hdl:10669/13348. ISSN 0022-1333. S2CID 19666406.
- Johnston, F. E.; Blumberg, B. S.; Agarwal, S. S.; Melartin, L.; Burch, T. A. (May 1969). "Alloalbuminemia in southwestern U.S. indians: polymorphism of albumin Naskapi and albumin Mexico". Human Biology. 41 (2): 263–270. ISSN 0018-7143. PMID 5808787.

== See also ==
- Blood disorders
- Commiphora wightii
- Ginseng
- Osteoarthritis
