= Subhash Marg =

Coordinates: 26°50′0.9″N 80°55′16.4″E

Route information
- Length: 3.7 km (2.3 mi)

Major junctions
- South end: Charbagh Railway Station
- North-West end: Medical Chauraha, Shah Mina Road

Location
- Country: India

Highway system
- Roads in India; Expressways; National; State; Asian

Subhash Marg is a road located in Lucknow, Uttar Pradesh in India, that travels through Pandariba, Naka Hindola, Raniganj, Pandeyganj and Rakabganj Chauraha. The road is 3.7 kilometres (2.3 mi) in length, it starts at Charbagh Railway Station and ends at Medical College Chauraha on Shah Mina Road.

== School(s) ==
- Navyug Girls Degree College

== Places of interest ==
- Naka Hindola electronics market
- Raniganj Dharamshala
- Rakabganj Chauraha
- King George Medical College
