= Uttaranchal Dental and Medical Research Institute =

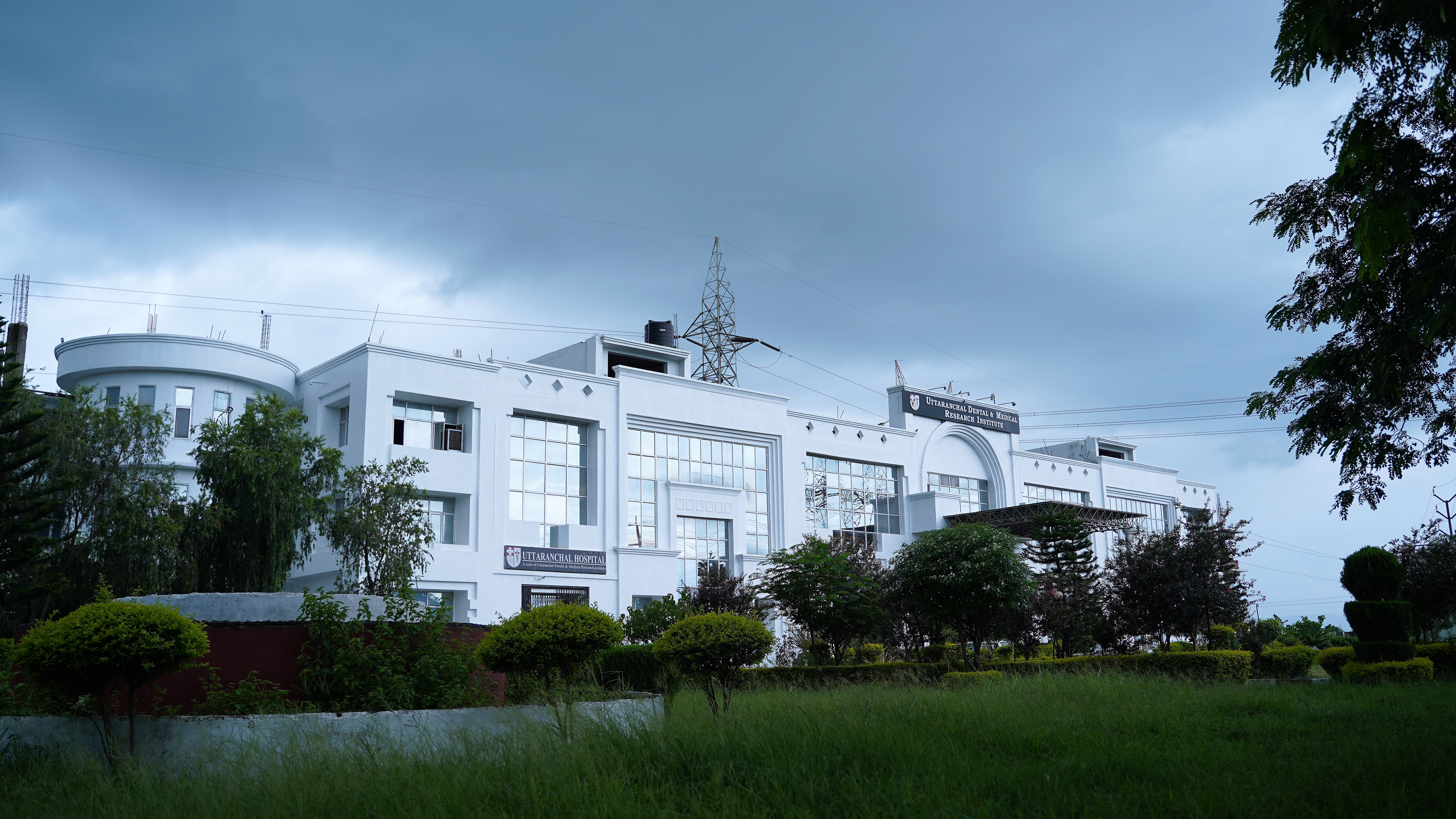

Uttaranchal Dental and Medical Research Institute (UDMRI), is a medical and dental institute located in Dehradun, Uttarakhand, India. The college offers five years of Bachelor of Dental Surgery (BDS) degree course at the undergraduate level and 3 years of Master of Dental Surgery (MDS) at the post graduate level. Affiliated to Hemwati Nandan Bahuguna Uttarakhand Medical Education University the institution is approved by the Dental Council of India (DCI), Ministry of Health and Family Welfare and the Government of India.

== Course ==
The Institute imparts BDS (Bachelor in Dental Surgery) and MDS training in accordance with the rules laid down by the Dental Council of India, New Delhi and Hemwati Nandan Bahuguna Uttarakhand Medical Education University. The Institute is affiliated to the said university for the purpose of examination and award of BDS and MDS Degree.

Total duration of BDS course is 4 years + one year compulsory internship during this period the professional examinations that is one at the end of each academic year, are conducted by the university. After passing the final professional examination it is compulsory to undergo one-year rotatory internship, Degree will be awarded only after completion of internship. Total duration of MDS course is 3 years

== Admissions ==
Admissions are done on the basis of candidate’s performance in NEET.

== Facilities ==
- Library
- Laboratories
- Cafeteria
- Accommodation for students
- Sports
- Computer Lab
- Wi-Fi Connectivity
- Museum
- Extra Curricular Activities

=== Library ===
The library has a seating capacity of 150 and put together are spread over 400sq.mt. This library has a collection of more than 2500 volumes of books. The library ensure provision of all support activities like audio visual room, book bank etc. It has also have subscription to more than 100 journals and magazines of national and international publications. Nearly all the available newspapers are within the easy reach of the students.
