= Mahdi Hasan =

Indian neuroscientist (1936–2013)

- Born: 21 March 1936; Akbarpur, Uttar Pradesh, India
- Died: 12 January 2013 (aged 76)
- Occupations: Anatomist and Neuroscientist
- Spouse: Abida Mahdi
- Children: 1

Mahdi Hasan (21 March 1936 – 12 January 2013) was an anatomist from Uttar Pradesh, India.

== Early life ==
Hasan was born on 21 March 1936 in Gadayan, Akbarpur, Ambedkar Nagar, Uttar Pradesh, India. His father, Jawad Husain, was a tehsildar, posted at Mohanlalganj in Lucknow district, and his mother was Tayyabunnisa Begun. Hasan's father died when Hasan was four years old, and his mother, being ill, was unable to care for him. He was subsequently raised by his brothers, Mr. Bakhshish Hussain and Mr. Ghulam Hussain, IAS.

== Education ==
In 1950, Hasan enrolled in the Christian College at Lucknow, where he did his Intermediate. Thereafter, he did his B.Sc. first year from the Lucknow University and in 1952 he was selected in M.B.B.S. at the King George Medical College. After graduation, he joined the Department of Anatomy as a demonstrator in the year 1958 and worked till early 1963 while completing his post-graduation as well. He moved to the J.N. Medical College, Aligarh Muslim University, Aligarh, as an associate professor, where he would spend the bulk of his career.

== Career ==
Hasan spent the majority of his career at the Aligarh Muslim University as a professor. In 1965, he traveled to Germany under the German Academic Exchange Service (DAAD) programme where he learned electron microscopy techniques, and studied gerontology under Paul Glees at the University of Göttingen. Returning to Aligarh in 1967, Hasan used his knowledge of German language to serve as an external examiner of German language students at Jawaharlal Nehru University and Aligarh Muslim University.

Hasan spent many years trying to establish a Brain Research facility at the Aligarh Muslim University. With assistance received from the German government, he succeeded in establishing the first Interdisciplinary Brain Research Centre in 1980. The Central Electron Microscope Facility was established in 1984.

At the J.N. Medical College, Aligarh Muslim University, he was chairman of Department of Anatomy for many years apart from being the dean of the Faculty of Medicine and the medical superintendent, principal, and the chief medical superintendent of the hospital. He also served as the dean of students' welfare of Aligarh Muslim University, besides being the president of cricket and football Clubs. He was also the elected president of the Teaching Staff Association, Anatomical Society of India, Indian Academy of Neurosciences, and Indian Gerontology Association.

Hasan delivered scores of lectures at various medical institutions such as the Albert Einstein College, NCTR Jefferson, University of Hawaii, and the Universities of Mainz and Göttingen. He was a member of the Expert Committee appointed by the Government of India to draft the National Education Policy for Health Sciences, which was headed by Prof. J.S. Bajaj during the period of 1988–90. In February 2010, he was appointed a member of the National Assessment and Accreditation Council (NAAC) of the Government of India. He was also an elected Fellow of the National Academy of Medical Sciences (India), Indian National Science Academy, and The National Academy of Sciences, India.

Hasan collaborated with colleagues from manifold disciplines like physiology, pharmacology, neurochemistry, pathology, neurology, radiology, otorhinolaryngology, and neurosurgery to study problems of national relevance such as environmental pollution, pesticide neurotoxicity, heavy metal neurotoxicity and hydrocephalus.

== Achievements ==
- Awarded Padma Shri, the fourth highest civilian award by the Government of India in the field of medicine in 2012
- Gold Medal Award was instituted by the Anatomical Society of India in 1990 (continues till date).
- An award was instituted by the Indian Academy of Biomedical Sciences in his name in 2014.
- Awarded Dr. B.C. Roy National Award, for being the Eminent Medical Teacher by Medical Council of India in 1992.

== Death ==
Hasan died on 12 January 2013 at the age of 76 from natural causes.
