= Shiv Narain Kureel =

Indian surgeon

- Born: 2 November 1956 (age 69); Uttar Pradesh, India
- Occupations: Pediatric surgeon Medical academic
- Known for: Pediatric surgery
- Awards: Padma Shri

Shiv Narain Kureel, is an Indian pediatric surgeon, medical academic and writer, and the professor and Head of the Department of Pediatric Surgery at King George's Medical University, Lucknow (U.P).

== Early life ==
Kureel was born on 2 November 1956 in Uttar Pradesh.

He is best known for the neonataogical and pediatric urological reconstructive surgeries.

== Achievements ==
- He conducted a research on exotrophy epispadias that was published on the first page of "The American Journal Urology Gold". It was a major achievement in the field of medical world from India.
- He is reported to have pioneered the single stage surgical technique for congenital problems in India
- He is credited with the performance of the first pediatric vaginal reconstructive surgery in India which was performed on an 11-year-old girl and a surgery on a two-year-old child to correct bladder exstrophy, a rare congenital abnormality.
- He is a life member and the president of the "Indian Association of Paediatric Surgeons" and also a reviewer of the Journal of Indian Association of Pediatric Surgeons, the official journal of the association.
- He has also published several medical papers.

== Awards ==
The Government of India awarded him with the fourth highest civilian honour of the Padma Shri, in 2016, for his contributions to medicine.
