= Nuzhat Husain =

Indian medical doctor

Nuzhat Husain MD FICP IFCAP
- Title: Professor, doctor
- Spouse: Dr. Mazhar Husain

Academic background
- Education: Jawaharlal Nehru Medical College, Aligarh Muslim University (MBBS, 1985); King George Medical College, University of Lucknow (MD, 1989) Boyscast Fellow at the Mass General Hospital Harvard University USA (1997); Fellow of the Indian College of Pathologists; International Fellow of the College of American Pathologists; Member of US and Canadian Association of Pathologists; Member of the International Academy of Pathologists Visiting fellow Memorial Sloan Kettering Cancer Centre, New York USA

Academic work
- Institutions: King George Medical College; Dr. Ram Manohar Lohia Institute of Medical Sciences

Nuzhat Husain is an Indian pathologist. She is former director of Dr. Ram Manohar Lohia Institute of Medical Sciences, Lucknow.

== Education ==
She completed her MBBS at Jawaharlal Nehru Medical College, Aligarh Muslim University in 1985 and MD (Pathology) from King George Medical College, University of Lucknow in 1989 with high merit and several awards including the President of India's silver medal for best woman student at the University in 1985 and the KB Kunwar Gold medal for best thesis in 1989, She also worked as a post doctoral fellow at Molecular Neuro-oncology Unit, Massachusetts General Hospital, Harvard University during 1997. She is an International Fellow of the College of American Pathologists (2010) and a Fellow of the Indian College of Pathologists (2002).

== Career ==
After her MD in 1989, she commenced her academic career as faculty at the King George's Medical University in 1991 where she served for 20 years and became professor 2001. In 2011 she joined Dr. Ram Manohar Lohia Institute of Medical Sciences as Professor and Head of Pathology and served in leadership administrative positions of Dean and director (2013 to 2015 and 2020 to present).

She is honorary secretary of the Indian College of Pathologists, She has completed tenures as President of the UP Chapter of IAPM as well as President of the UP Chapter of IAC.

Dr. Husain has been involved in developing a public–public partnership and referral framework within the government sector. She has also played a role in the implementation of diagnostic services, including molecular pathology, flow cytometry, e-slides and telepathology, and liquid-based cytology within public healthcare settings.

As Director and Dean Dr Ram Manohar Lohia institute Dr Husain made significant contributions in expansion of clinical, academic and research facilities with introduction of the Speciality, superspeciality degree courses. She expanded the institute to two additional campuses with the foundation of the academic block and a new campus of 20 acres on Shaheed path, providing a strong and effective leadership.
