= B. K. Anand =

Indian physiologist

- Born: 18 September 1917; Lahore, British India
- Died: 2 April 2007 (aged 89)
- Citizenship: India
- Education: King George Medical College, Lucknow
- Awards: Padma Shri
- Scientific career
- Fields: Neurophysiology
- Workplaces: Lady Hardinge Medical College, All India Institute of Medical Sciences

Bal Krishan Anand (1917–2007) was an Indian physiologist and pharmacologist. He was credited for the discovery of the feeding centre in the hypothalamus in 1951. He is considered the founder of modern Neurophysiology in India.

== Early life ==
He was born in Lahore as Bal Krishan Anand in 1917. He graduated from King George Medical College in 1940 and obtained his M.D. degree in 1948. He joined in 1949 the Lady Hardinge Medical College as Professor of Physiology.

He went to Yale University as a Fellow of the Rockefeller Foundation in 1950 and worked with John Brobeck. They had published their research work in 1951. He \ returned to India in 1952 and continued his research at Lady Hardinge Medical College.

He joined the All India Institute of Medical Sciences as its first professor in the Department of Physiology in 1956. He was instrumental in establishing the guidelines of education for M.B., B.S. and Postgraduate students. He became Dean of that Institute.

He was instrumental in the establishment of Sher-i-Kashmir Institute of Medical Sciences in 1982.

== Bibliography ==
- B. K. Anand and J. R. Brobeck: Hypothalamic control of food intake in rats and cats. Yale J. Biol. Med. 24:123-40, 1951.
- B. K. Anand and S. Dua: Hypothalamic involvement in the Pituitary Adrenocortical Response. Journal of Physiology. I955. I27, I53-I56.
- B. K. Anand and S. Dua: Circulatory and Respiratory changes induced by Electrical stimulation of Limbic system (Visceral brain). Journal of Neurophysiology. 19: 393–400, 1956.
- B. K. Anand, S. Dua and Baldev Singh. Electrical activity of the hypothalamic 'feeding centres' under the effect of changes in blood chemistry, Electroencephalography and Clinical Neurophysiology. Volume 13, Issue 1, February 1961, Pages 54–59.
- B. K. Anand, G. S. Chhina, and Baldev Singh. Effect of Glucose on the Activity of Hypothalamic "Feeding Centers". Science 2 November 1962: Vol. 138. no. 3540, pp. 597 – 598.

== Awards ==
- He was awarded the Shanti Swarup Bhatnagar Prize for Science and Technology in Medical Sciences in 1963.
- Government of India awarded him Padma Shri in Medicine in 1969.
- He was a fellow of the National Academy of Medical Sciences, Indian National Science Academy and the Indian Academy of Sciences.
- The Medical Council of India awarded him the Dr. B. C. Roy Award in 1984.
