= Priyadarshi Ranjan =

Indian urologist and surgeon

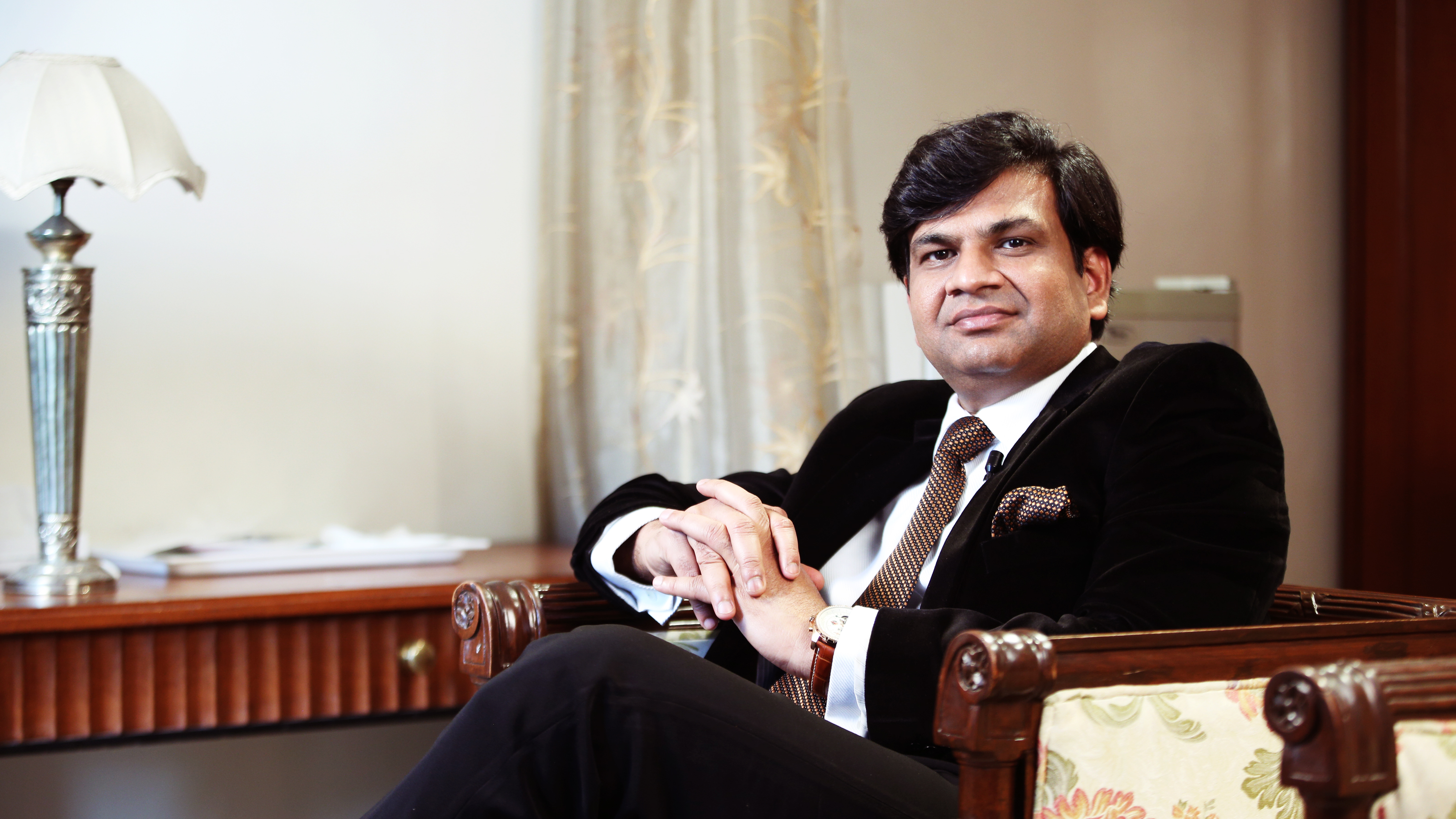
- Ranjan at his office in 2016
- Born: 14 November 1978 (age 47); Lucknow, India
- Education: King George’s Medical College (MBBS, MS); PGIMER (MCh)
- Occupations: Urologist, Kidney Transplant Surgeon, Philanthropist
- Spouse: Ranjana Singh
- Website: KidneyTransplantIndia

Priyadarshi Ranjan (born 14 November 1978) is an Indian urologist, robotic surgeon, kidney transplant surgeon, and researcher. He is commonly perceived as the "Kidney Man of India". He is among the top 10 transplant surgeons across the globe who is certified of performing a Robotic Kidney Transplant. Currently, regarded as one of the pioneering leaders for kidney transplantation across the globe.

== Career ==
He founded and pioneered the Comprehensive Kidney Transplant Programme at Fortis Hospital, Mohali in 2011, currently, the chief of Urology and Kidney transplantation also serves as the academic chairman of the National Board for super speciality training in urology at the same hospital. He is also the Executive Director & Chairman of the TransCare group & services, which has announced a new beginning in the long-term outcome of transplant recipients by optimising the Immunosuppression & follow-up protocols. Apart from Paediatric Kidney Transplants, Double or Triple Vessel Kidney Transplants, ABO Incompatible Kidney Transplants and Swap Kidney Transplants, he conceptualised a mobile application by the name of "iKidney" for the facilitation of swap kidney transplant. Ranjan is on faculty at numerous Urological and Kidney Transplantation forums across the globe and has 35 international publications in medical journals. A frequent speaker at many transplant meetings and a reviewer of various international Journals, aside from authoring three books in the field of uUrology and kidney transplantation.

Ranjan has ascended a new era of kidney transplantation in Mohali, Punjab to a global level ministering patient from worldwide shores for kidney transplant surgery. The list includes recently performed kidney transplant of former Kenyan Governor Philip Ruto Latilolo Rotino, apart from tutoring various international surgeons in the specialty he is identified in the field of transplantation for taking up and successfully managing most difficult transplant cases such as children, sensitised or blood group incompatible, obese patients and has launched the latest robotic kidney transplant in the region. He has performed the first cadaver kidney transplant in the state of Punjab, embarking cadaver transplant in the state. Listed in the Limca book of records for challenging and unmanageable kidney transplant on the heaviest patient in India.

He is among the few transplant specialist surgeons in India to start and develop ABO incompatible (when the blood of donor and recipient does not match) and swap kidney programmes. He was invited by the Government of Mauritania to establish a transplant facility there.

Ranjan has 35 worldwide editions across several reputed journals of the world and has authored three books on his subject of expertise. An invited faculty at numerous national, international transplant and urology forums has represented India globally at European and American transplant forums. His work continuously grabs a dedicated editorial in the influential newspapers of India in the form of electronic and published media.

== Education ==
In 1996, Ranjan got admitted in King George's Medical College of Lucknow for MBBS and achieved it in 2002. From the same institute, he entered for specialisation and received an MS (General Surgery). He topped his batch throughout his graduation (MBBS) & post-graduation (MS) with 14 gold and 7 silver medals. He was then chosen for specialised MCh Urology programme in the coveted PGIMER, Chandigarh and undergone training in kidney surgery and kidney transplant, making him the most qualified and trained kidney transplant surgeons in India securing him a faculty position at the Sanjay Gandhi Postgraduate Institute, Lucknow, India.

To further enhance his skills and introduce the concept of ABO-incompatible transplant in India, he committed himself to high-level training in mismatched ABO-incompatible kidney transplant at the Johns Hopkins Transplant centre under Professor Robert A. Montgomery, also trained on optimisation of Immunosuppressive medicines from the Aula clinic, Barcelona, Spain. Fortis hospital, Mohali (Punjab, India) persuaded him to start a kidney transplant programme in 2011.

== Robotic surgery ==
While the world moved to robotic surgery, he was still handling surgeries conventionally, a strong supporter and promoter of modern technological progress in the field of medical sciences, he felt restless till he qualified and mastered the technique of Advanced Robotic surgery starting the Robotic kidney surgery programme in Punjab. He has mentored and trained several national and international superspecialty fellows in the discipline of urology and kidney transplantation and took DNB Urology programme at Fortis to new heights.

== Philanthropy ==
While practising and helping numerous critically ill kidney disease patients in Fortis Mohali, he observed tremendous anguish, sadness and struggle for survival due to unbearable physical pain and financially crippling character of kidney disease in patients this made him very restless and moved him to such extent that he decided to help those less fortunate souls by founding a non-governmental organization. In 2015, with whatever resources were available to him he founded Chandigarh Kidney Foundation a not for profit charitable Non-Governmental Organization in Chandigarh (UT) currently acting president.

The principal working area of Chandigarh Kidney Foundation is to organise free check-up camps for early detection of kidney problem, raising funds to sponsor financially weak patients, conduct organ donation drives through seminars, workshops, awareness programmes and to educate & raise awareness in general public about Kidney health and optimal kidney functioning through online media and publishing informative literature.

== Family background ==
His father was a doctor and mother a homemaker at Lucknow, Uttar Pradesh, India. He has been a keen Badminton player. He got united with Ranjana Singh from Lady Harding Medical College, who works as a faculty in Hospital Administration at PGIMER, Chandigarh.

== Honours and accolades ==
- He has received honours in eleven subjects along with 14 Gold and 7 Silver medals for topping many subjects throughout MBBS.
- Eagle fellowship from the Urological Society of India, North Zone
- GM Phadke fellowship from the Urological Society of India: 2009
- Awarded Limca book of Records twice:
  - Kidney Cancer 2013
  - Kidney Transplant on heaviest patient 2016

== Publications ==
=== Chapters ===
- Singh SK, Ranjan P, Agarwal MM. The Neurogenic Voiding Dysfunction- The basics and beyond. In Reviews in Neurology. 2006 Prabhakar S, Taly AB (eds). Bangalore, Chandrika 2006; 242-272

=== Books ===
- Urethral Catheterisation – A user's manual (A book elaborating upon Technique of urethral catheterisation, indications and commonly faced Problems with a urethral catheter.)
- UTI in females – A clinical perspective. (A book elaborating upon the common causes of urinary tract infections in females and their current management protocols.)
- Illustrations in a series of 5 patient benefit manuals for different endourologic procedures:
  - Transurethral resection of the prostate
  - Transurethral resection of bladder tumour
  - Ureteroscopy
  - Percutaneous Nephrolithotomy
  - Directly Visualised Internal Urethrotomy
