= Ravi Kant (surgeon) =

Indian surgeon (born 1956)

Doctor Ravi Kant Padma Shri
- Born: 14 September 1956 (age 70); Ayodhya, Uttar Pradesh, India
- Title: Professor, doctor
- Awards: Dr. B. C. Roy Award (2014); Padma Shri (2016); Yash Bharti Award (2016)

Academic background
- Education: King George's Medical University
- Website: http://ravibina.blogspot.in/

Ravi Kant (born 14 September 1956) is an Indian surgeon. He is a professor of surgery at Sharda University, who was the director of the All India Institute of Medical Sciences, Rishikesh from 2017 to 2021 and the Vice Chancellor of King George's Medical University from 2014 to 2017. Earlier he was head of surgery at All India Institute of Medical Sciences in Bhopal and faculty at Maulana Azad Medical College in New Delhi. The Government of India awarded him the Padma Shri in 2016.

== Awards ==
- Dr. B. C. Roy Award by the Medical Council of India
- Yash Bharti Award by the Government of Uttar Pradesh
- Padma Shri by the President of India
