= Jawaharlal Nehru Medical College, Aligarh =

Medical school in India

Jawaharlal Nehru Medical College
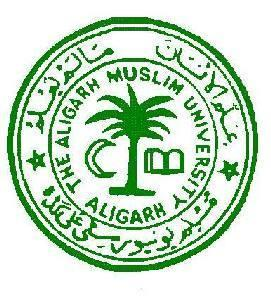
- Motto: علم الانسان ما لم يعلم (‘Allamal insaana maa lam ya’lam)
- Motto in English: Taught man what he knew not (Qur'an 96:5)
- Type: Medical college
- Established: 2 October 1962; 63 years ago
- Affiliations: National Medical Commission
- Academic affiliations: Aligarh Muslim University
- Principal: Dr. Anjum Parvez
- Location: Aligarh, Uttar Pradesh, India; 27.9187329°N 78.085761°E
- Website: amu.ac.in/jnmc

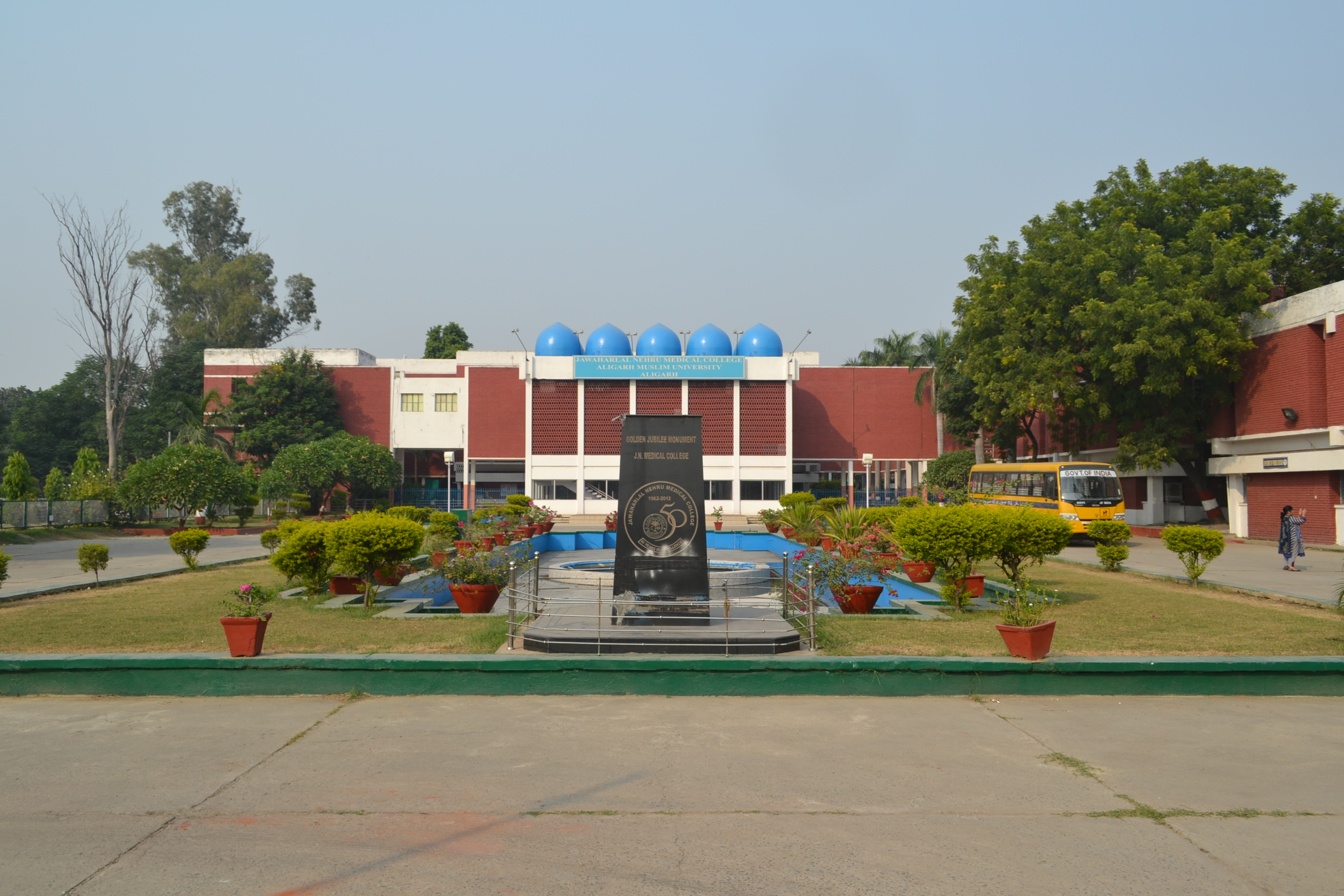
Jawaharlal Nehru Medical College

Jawaharlal Nehru Medical College is the constituent medical college of Aligarh Muslim University, located in Aligarh, in the Indian state of Uttar Pradesh.

In September, 2014 researchers found deadly bacteria on the college premises. This is the first recorded presence of this particular strain of antibiotic resistant "super bug" in India.

It launched an e-consultancy and monitoring cell for diabetes.

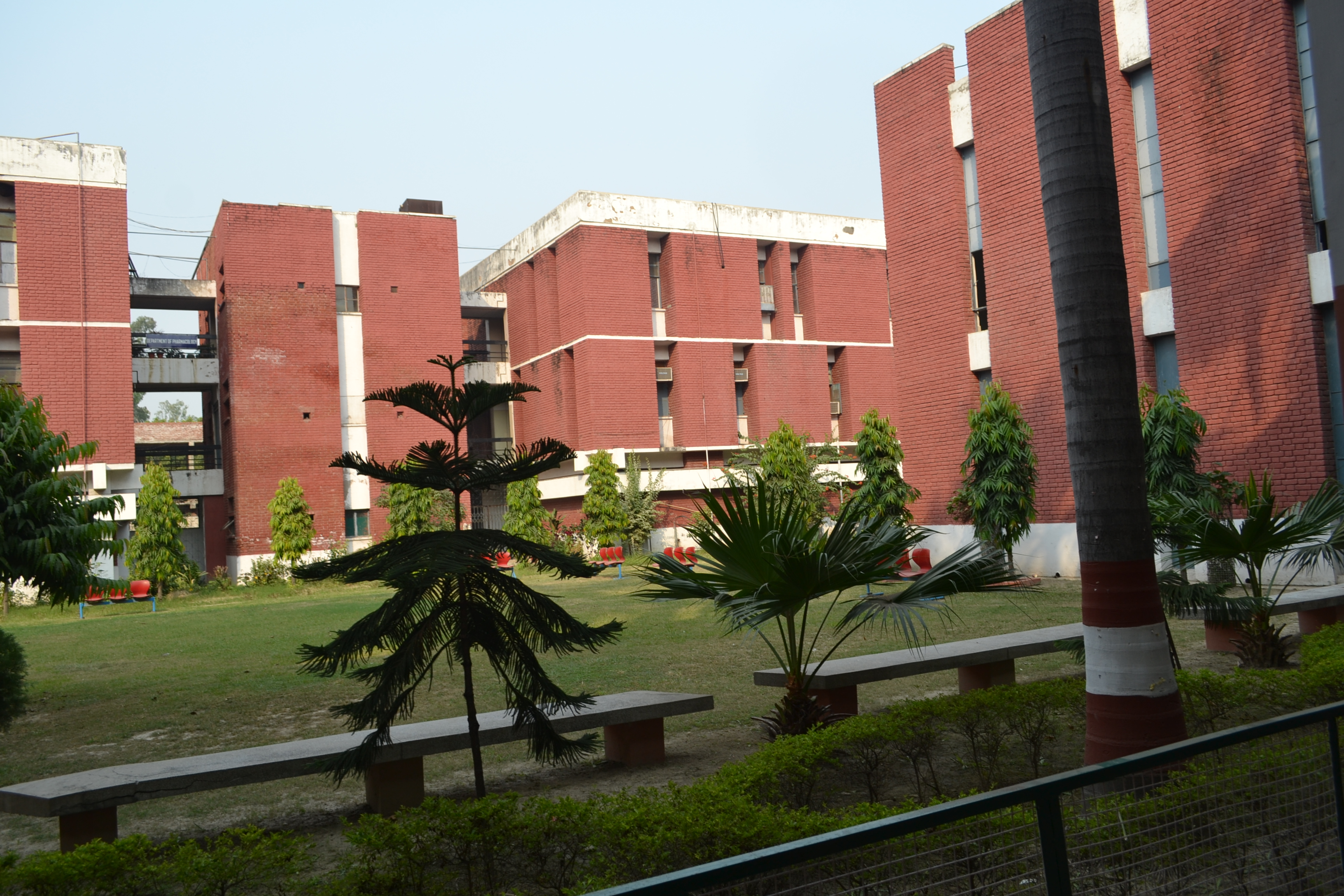
Jawaharlal Nehru Medical College

== History ==
JNMC came into existence through the vision of Dr. Sir Ziauddin Ahmed, who saw the need of a medical college for the poor community at Aligarh. He worked with colleagues and students to establish a medical college at the university. He raised funds for the college. He died before the institution opened. Colonel S. Bashir Hasan Zaidi (vice chancellor), Major S.M.H. Naqvi (Principal) and M.M. Siddiqui (Registrar) were instrumental in starting the college.

The college grew under the leadership of Khan Bahadur Islam Nabi Khan and Prof. Hadi Hasan, who drove the fundraising campaign. Nearly eight million rupees were collected from across India. The medical college opened on 2 October 1962 (the 93rd birthday of Mahatma Gandhi) with an intake of 40 MBBS students. Enrollment of 40 students annually continued up to 1985 when it increased to 100 students, which continued until 1996, when enrollment grew to 150 That year a BDS course debuted with an intake of 40 students.

=== Golden era ===
In the early seventies the college was under the Deanship and Principalship of Colonel M. Tajuddin. Dr. Mahmoodur Rahman, the then vice chancellor of Aligarh Muslim University played a key role in the establishment of Dr. Sir Ziauddin Dental College under the Faculty of Medicine.

== Academic profile ==
JNMC signed a memorandum of understanding with Fortis Escort Heart Institute where in-staffs of AMU will train at Fortis.

== Ranking ==
University and college rankings

Medical – India
- NIRF (2022): 22
- India Today (2020): 19

The college was ranked 22 among medical colleges in India in 2022 by the National Institutional Ranking Framework (NIRF) and 19 by India Today in 2020.

== Notable alumni ==
- Punathil Kunjabdulla
- S. T. Hasan
- Syed Ziaur Rahman
- Nuzhat Husain
- Ashok Seth
- Jaideep Malhotra

== See also ==
- Jawaharlal Nehru Medical College, Wardha, Maharashtra, India
- Jawaharlal Nehru Medical College, Ajmer, Rajasthan, India
- Jawaharlal Nehru Medical College, Belgaum, Karnataka, India
