= Veer Chandra Singh Garhwali Government Institute of Medical Science and Research =

Medical college in Uttarakhand, India

Coordinates: 30.227910°N 78.823071°E

Veer Chandra Singh Garhwali Government Institute of Medical Science & Research
- Abbreviation: GMC Srinagar
- Established: 2008; 18 years ago
- Type: Government
- Location: Srinagar, Pauri Garhwal district, Uttarakhand, India
- Principal: Dr. Ashutosh Sayana
- Affiliations: Hemwati Nandan Bahuguna Uttarakhand Medical Education University, NMC
- Website: www.vcsgsrinagar.org

Government Medical College, Srinagar, Pauri Garhwal or Veer Chandra Singh Garhwali Government Medical Science and Research Institute or VCSGGMSRI is a government medical college located near Srinagar, Uttarakhand, in Pauri Garhwal district, Uttarakhand, India. The institute was established in 2008. The college is located midst of Himalayan mountainous ranges. This college is equipped with advanced medical equipment and cutting-edge medical technology which has proved to be a boon for the local population. The college admits 150 (from 2021) M.B.B.S. students annually through NEET examination.

== Connectivity ==
The college is well connected via road to the capital of Uttarakhand, Dehradun. College is at a distance of about 126 km from the nearby Jolly Grant Airport, Dehradun. Construction of a rail line joining Srinagar to Rishikesh is ongoing.

== Infrastructure ==
College is well equipped with modern infrastructure. There are 5 lecture theatres, each having a capacity of 140 students and equipped with modern audio visual aids and AC. It also has a fully computerized library with wi-fi connectivity. Hostels are good with necessary facilities including mess. All departments have adequate space and modern laboratories. A modern auditorium was also inaugurated in 2020. The entire campus is under CCTV surveillance.

== Associated hospital ==
HNB Base Hospital is the associated hospital of the college. It is a 500-bed hospital with all modern facilities.

== Campus ==
College has a well maintained campus, judicious use of solar energy for its electrification being a marked feature. The campus is surrounded by lush green vegetation.

== Admission procedure ==
85% of total seats are filled by state quota, and the rest (15%) by all-India quota. Entrance exam for admission under state quota is NEET-UG

== Academics ==
Four batches have passed out from the college as of 2016.

== Courses ==
The institute offers M.B.B.S., MD/MS, and post MBBS NBEMS Diploma courses in various specialties including Paediatrics, Anaesthesia, Obstetrics and Gynaecology, ENT, Ophthalmology, Community Medicine, Pathology, Microbiology, Forensic Medicine, Biochemistry, Physiology and Anatomy.
