= Prem Nath Wahi =

Indian pathologist

- Born: 10 April 1908; Moradabad, Uttar Pradesh, India
- Died: 8 July 1991 (aged 83)
- Education: King George Medical College; Sarojini Naidu Medical College
- Occupations: Civil servant Writer; Medical academic
- Years active: 1935–1984
- Known for: Medical academics
- Spouse: Krishan Kumari
- Children: One son and three daughters
- Awards: Padma Bhushan; Dr. B. C. Roy Award; IMA Platinum Jubilee Award

Prem Nath Wahi (1908–1991) was an Indian pathologist, writer, medical academic and the director general of the Indian Council of Medical Research. He was a fellow of the Royal College of Physicians of London, a founder fellow of the National Academy of Medical Sciences and a recipient of Dr. B. C. Roy Award and the Padma Bhushan.

== Biography ==
Born on 10 April 1908 at Moradabad in Uttar Pradesh, Wahi did his schooling at the local schools and secured his graduate degree in medicine from King George Medical College in 1932. His advanced studies in pathology was at Sarojini Naidu Medical College where he started his career as a member of faculty in 1935 and rose to position of the professor and the head of the department of pathology in 1941. In 1960, he became the principal of the college and worked there till his superannuation in 1968, to be appointed as the vice chancellor of Agra University. A year later, he took up the position of the director general of the Indian Council of Medical Research.

After retiring from ICMR in 1974, he worked at Sir Ganga Ram Hospital as a consultant pathologist till 1984. He wrote over 300 medical articles and books, including Histological Typing of Oral and Oropharyngeal Tumours, a book written for the World Health Organization, and has mentored several research scholars in their doctoral studies. The Government of India awarded him the third highest civilian honour of the Padma Bhushan, in 1970, for his contributions to medicine. He received the Platinum Jubilee Award of the Indian Medical Association in 1974 and a decade later, the Medical Council of India honoured him with Dr. B. C. Roy Award, the highest Indian medical award, in 1984. He was a fellow of the Royal College of Physicians of London and a founder fellow of the National Academy of Medical Sciences.

Wahi, who was married to Krishan Kumari, died on 8 July 1991, survived by their son and three daughters. The Indian Council of Medical Research has since instituted an annual award, Dr. Prem Nath Wahi Award, to recognize excellence in the fields of cytology and preventive oncology, in honour of its former director general. The Indian Academy of Cytologists conducts an annual oration under the name, Dr P. N. Wahi Academy Oration.

== See also ==
- Sarojini Naidu Medical College
- King George's Medical University
