= Meenakshi Sargogi =

Indian Industrialist

- Born: 1944; Allahabad, Uttar Pradesh, India
- Died: 2020 (aged 75–76); Kolkata
- Occupation: Industrialist
- Years active: 1979–2015
- Awards: Padma Shri

Meenakshi Sargogi was an Indian industrialist and the former managing director and the incumbent non-executive director of Balrampur Chini Mills. She is credited with the revival of a loss-making sugar business into a profitable multi-focussed industrial conglomerate. She received the fourth highest civilian award of the Padma Shri from the Government of India in 1992 for her contributions to the Indian sugar industry.

== Biography ==
Born in 1944 in Allahabad, in the most populous Indian state of Uttar Pradesh, she did her early schooling at St. Mary's Convent High School, Nainital and returned to Kanpur where she completed her graduate studies. She is reported to have learnt the basics of the business, dismantled the senior management and turned around the company to make a profit of ₹ 4.4 million in the first full year of business.

Meenakshi shared the responsibilities of the managing director of the company with her husband for 22 years until June 2015 when she stepped down from active career to retain the post of a non-executive director. During this period, Balrampur Sugar Mills grew from a single unit business to multiple factory industry which she achieved by purchasing Babhnan Sugar Mills in 1990, Tulsipur Sugar Mills in 1998, the Rauzagaon factory of Dhampur Sugar Mills in 2005 and Indo Gulf Sugar Mills in 2007 and diversified the business to other areas such as ethanol and power.

== See also ==
- History of sugar
