= Government Doon Medical College =

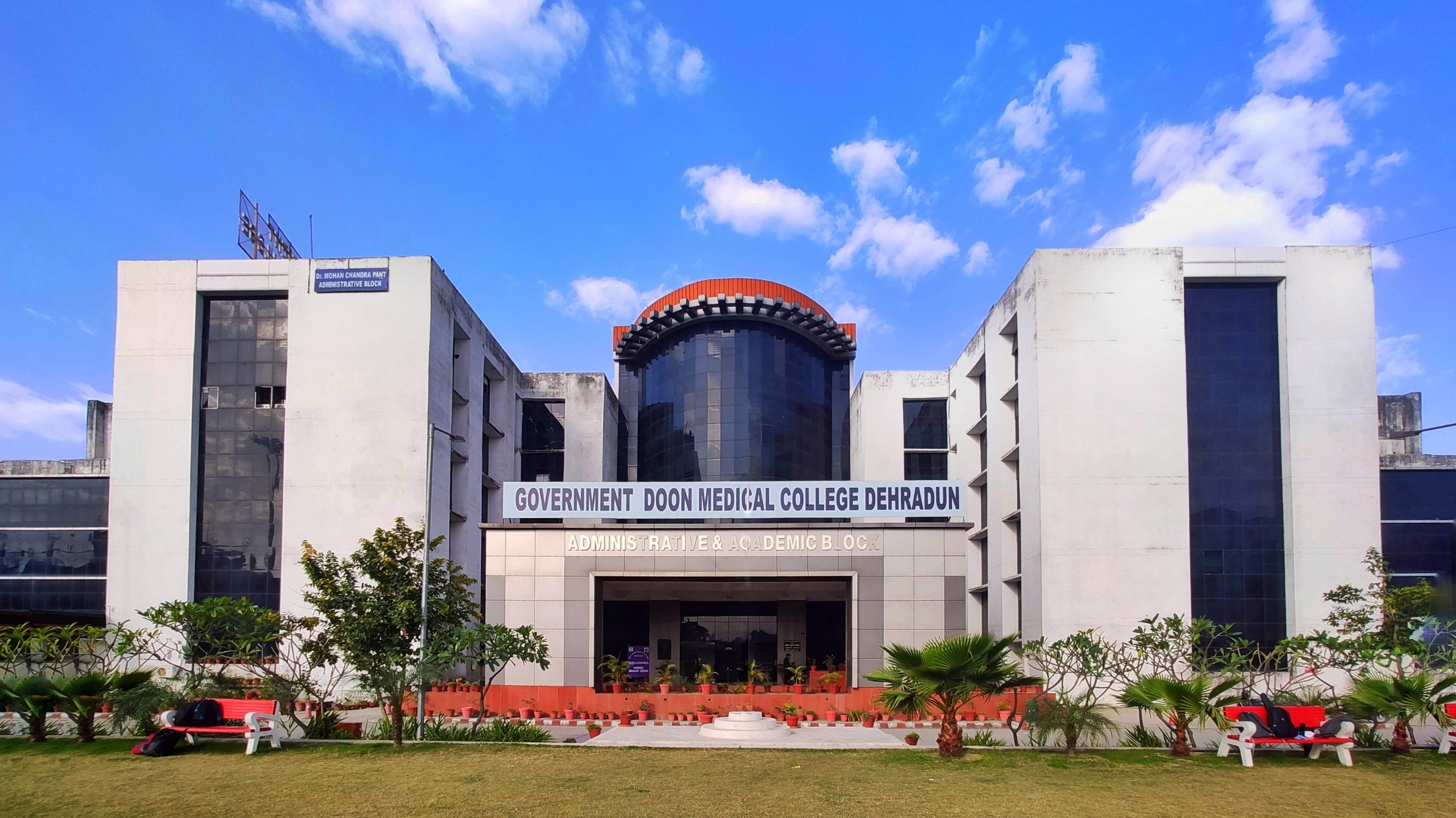
- Other names: Doon Medical College
- Motto: सर्वे सन्तु निरामयाः
- Motto in English: May no one suffer from illness
- Type: Government Medical College and Hospital
- Established: 2016; 10 years ago
- Affiliations: Hemwati Nandan Bahuguna Uttarakhand Medical Education University
- Principal: Dr. Geeta Jain
- Location: Dehrakhas, Patelnagar, Dehradun, Uttarakhand, 248001, India
- Campus: Urban
- Website: https://gdmcuk.com/

Government Doon Medical College is a full-fledged tertiary Government Medical college and hospital. It is located at Dehradun in Uttarakhand. The college imparts the degree of Bachelor of Medicine and Surgery (MBBS). The yearly undergraduate student intake is 175.

== Courses ==
Government Doon Medical College undertakes the education and training of 175 students in MBBS courses. It also recently started postgraduate medical courses.

== Affiliated ==
The college is affiliated with Hemwati Nandan Bahuguna Uttarakhand Medical Education University and is recognized by the National Medical Commission.
