= Trilok Chandra Goel =

Surgeon

Prof Trilok Chandra Goel
- Born: 3 October 1938 (age 87)
- Education: MBBS, MS
- Organization: King George's Medical University
- Known for: Hindi Textbook of Surgery
- Awards: Hewett Medal, DSc
- Website: sites.google.com/site/drtcgoel/

Trilok Chandra Goel (T C Goel) (born October 3, 1938) worked as a Professor of Surgery in King George's Medical University, Lucknow, India between 1986 and 1999. He was re-appointed Emeritus Professor in 2015.

== Early life ==
Son of Ganga Prasad Goel and his wife Sharbati Goel, Trilok Chandra Goel was born in Dankaur, a village in greater Noida in Uttar Pradesh, India. He was educated in Ghaziabad and then graduated with Bachelor of Medicine, Bachelor of Surgery degree from King George's Medical University, Lucknow, India topping the final examination to win Hewett Medal in 1962. In 1965, he completed his Master of Surgery from the same university.

== Career and research ==
Immediately after completing his Master in General Surgery, he was appointed Lecturer in the Department of Surgery in King George's Medical University in 1966. He then became Professor of Surgery in 1986. Goel has special interest in managing the various manifestations of neglected tropical disease: lymphatic filariasis. He wrote a monograph (Lymphatic Filariasis, published by Springer Science, Singapore ISBN 978-981-10-2256-2) and was consulted by the World Health Organization for guidelines on "Surgical management of lymphatic hydrocele." (WHO/CDS/NTD/PCT/2019.04).

=== Publications ===
Goel has written many scientific articles in journals like the "Indian Journal of Surgery". and Indian Journal of Plastic Surgery (ORCID).

=== Books ===
Goel has written many medical and non-medical books.

- KGMU Textbook of General Surgery for Dental Students (Theory and Practical). 2018, Wolters Kluwer Health (India), Gurgaon, Haryana. ISBN 978-938-79-6339-9
- Lymphatic Filariasis, 2016, Springer Science, Singapore. ISBN 978-981-10-2256-2
- KGMU A Method of Clinical Surgery, 2016, Ahuja Publishing House, New Delhi. ISBN 978-93-80316-51-2
- Adhunik Shalya Chikitsa Vigyan, 2015, Jaypee Brothers Medical Publishers (P) Ltd, New Delhi. ISBN 978-93-5152-542-4
- Practical Surgery, Short clinical cases: diagnosis, viva voce and discussion, 2015, Jaypee Brothers Medical Publishers (P) Ltd, New Delhi. ISBN 978-93-5152-678-0
- Practical Surgery, Long clinical cases: diagnosis and viva voce, 2010, Jaypee Brothers Medical Publishers (P) Ltd, New Delhi. ISBN 978-81-8448-928-6
- Clinical Signs of Disease (Surgical Sciences), 1998, Aditya Distributors, Lucknow. ISBN 978-81-8618-607-7
- Etiology. New Age International, New Delhi, 1996.
- Causes in Clinical Practice, Vol-III, CBS Publishers & Distributors, Delhi, 1993.
- Causes in Clinical Practice, Vol-II, CBS Publishers & Distributors, Delhi, 1992.
- Causes in Clinical Practice, Vol-I, Argo Publishing House, Lucknow, 1990.

=== Hindi textbook of surgery ===
In India, medical education is imparted in English hence Adhunik Shalya Chikitsa Vigyan ISBN 978-93-5152-542-4 is unique that it has been written in Hindi (native language of North India and 4th most common language in the world). While writing this book, Goel created many Hindi medical terms that were published in an article published in the Indian Journal of Surgery.

== Honours ==
- Hewett Medal, 1962.
- Lifetime achievement award, 2014.
- Doctorate Honoris Causa degree, 2017.
