= Jagdish Narain Sinha =

Indian pharmacologist

- Born: 15 January 1939 (age 87); Uttar Pradesh, India
- Known for: Studies on medullary baroreflex
- Awards: 1984 Shanti Swarup Bhatnagar Prize
- Scientific career
- Fields: Neuropharmacology
- Institutions: UP Dental College and Research Centre; King George's Medical University

Jagdish Narain Sinha (born 1939) is an Indian pharmacologist and a former professor at the Department of Pharmacology and Therapeutics of the Uttar Pradesh Dental College and Research Centre, Lucknow. He is also a former member of the faculty of King George's Medical University and has been a member of the Independent Ethics Committee of the Central Drugs Standard Control Organization.

Born on 15 January 1939, Sinha is known for his research on the delineation of the neurochemical modulation of medullary baroreflex. His researches have been documented through a number of articles (Note: Please see Selected bibliography section) and his work has been cited by many researchers. The Council of Scientific and Industrial Research, the apex agency of the Government of India for scientific research, awarded him the Shanti Swarup Bhatnagar Prize for Science and Technology, one of the highest Indian science awards for his contributions to Medical Sciences in 1984. (Note: Long link - please select award year to see details)

== Selected bibliography ==
- R.C. Srimal, B.P. Jaju, J.N. Sinha, K.S. Dixit, K.P. Bhargava (1969). "Analysis of the central vasomotor effects of choline". European Journal of Pharmacology. 5 (3): 239–44. doi:10.1016/0014-2999(69)90144-7. PMID 5254028.
- J.N. Sinha, M.L. Gupta, K.P. Bhargava (1969). "Effect of histamine and antihistaminics on central vasomotor loci". European Journal of Pharmacology. 5 (3): 235–38. doi:10.1016/0014-2999(69)90143-5. PMID 4388969.
- Rastogi SK, Puri JN, Sinha JN, Bhargava KP (1979). "Involvement of central cholinoceptors in Metrazol-induced convulsions". Psychopharmacology. 65 (2): 215–7. doi:10.1007/bf00433052. PMID 117491. S2CID 30633610.
- Verma M, Gujrati VR, Sharma M, Bhalla TN, Saxena AK, Sinha JN, Bhargava KP, Shanker K (1984). "Syntheses and anti-inflammatory activities of substituted arylamino-(N'-benzylidene)acetohydrazides and derivatives". Archiv der Pharmazie. 317 (10): 890–4. doi:10.1002/ardp.19843171015. PMID 6393911. S2CID 2551471.
- Sunil Gurtu, Kamlesh Kumar Pant, Jagdish Narain Sinha, Krishna Prasad Bhargava (1984). "An investigation into the mechanism of cardiovascular responses elicited by electrical stimulation of locus coeruleus and subcoeruleus in the cat". Brain Research. 301 (1): 59–64. doi:10.1016/0006-8993(84)90402-5. PMID 6733488. S2CID 20093700.
