= Planta Medica =

- Discipline: Medicinal plant and natural products research
- Language: English

Publication details
- History: 1953–present
- Publisher: Thieme Medical Publishers
- Frequency: 18/year
- Impact factor: 2.74 (2018)

Standard abbreviations
- ISO 4: Planta Med.

Indexing
- ISSN: 0032-0943 (print); 1439-0221 (web)

Links
- Journal homepage

Planta Medica is a peer-reviewed journal published by Thieme Medical Publishers and covers medicinal plants and bioactive natural products of natural origin. Planta Medica is the official journal of the Society for Medicinal Plant and Natural Product Research (GA). According to the Journal Citation Reports, the journal's 2016 impact factor is 2.342. Planta Medica is a Q1 journal in integrative and complementary medicine, and a Q2 journal in plant sciences.

Oliver Kayser, from the TU Dortmund University, and Robert Fuerst, Wolfgang-von-Goethe University Frankfurt are the editors-in-chief.

In the 18 issues published per year, Planta Medica covers the following areas of medicinal plants and natural product research:

- Biological and pharmacological activities
- Natural products chemistry and analytical studies
- Pharmacokinetic investigations
- Formulation and delivery systems of natural products

The journal accepts original research papers, reviews, minireviews, and perspectives.

== History ==
When Planta Medica was founded in 1953, the first Editor-in-Chief was E. Schratz, University of Münster, Germany. The journal published its first English language article in 1959 and its first online article in 2001. Since 2013, Thieme has annually awarded the Most Innovative Paper of the Year to the most promising paper from the previous year that was published in Planta Medica.

== Indexing ==
Planta Medica is indexed in Current Contents/Life Sciences, Science Citation Index, MEDLINE, EMBASE and SCOPUS.
