= Jaideep Malhotra =

Indian gynecologist

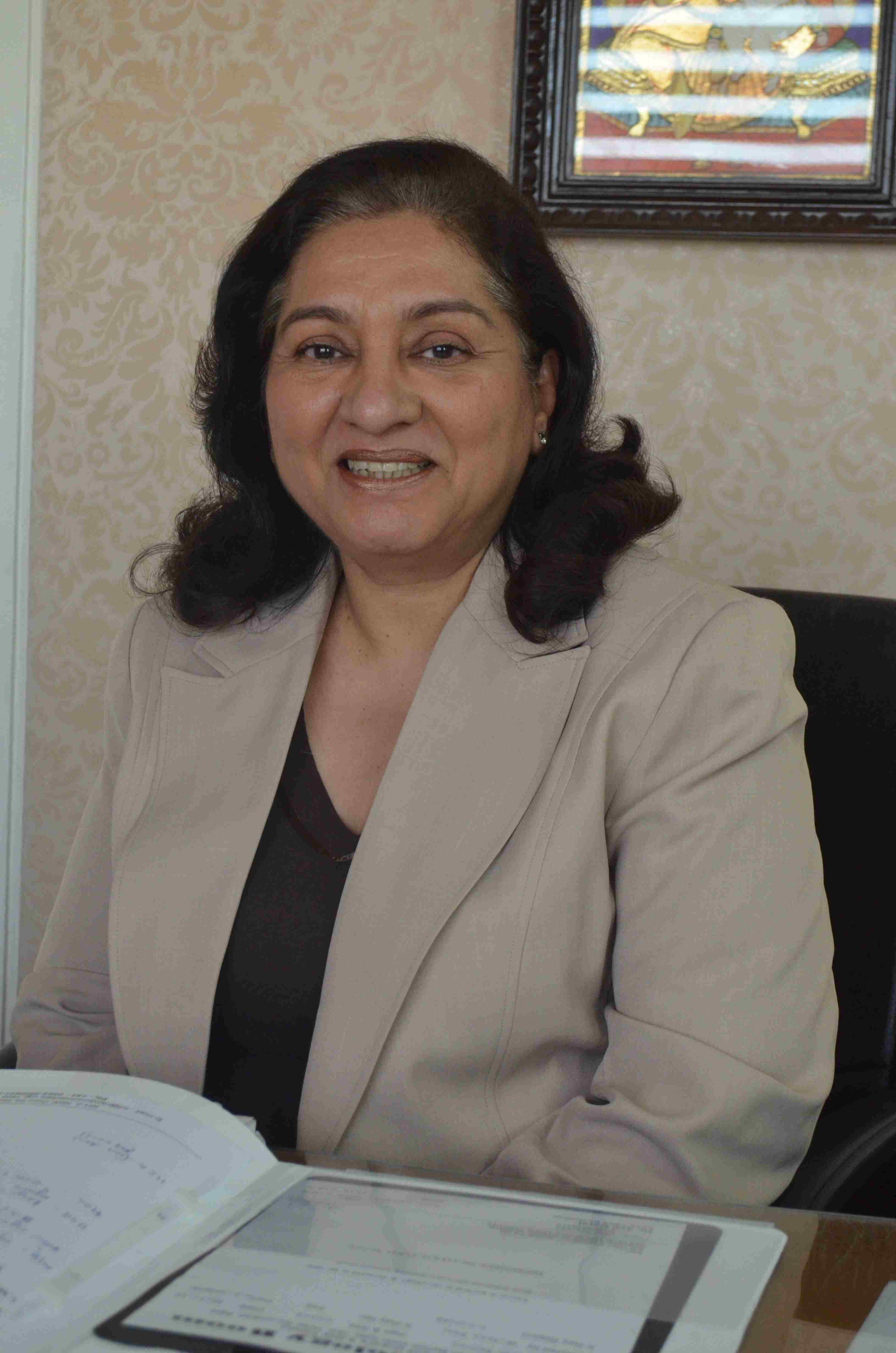
- Born: 11 September 1960 (age 66); Meerut, Uttar Pradesh
- Education: Jawaharlal Medical College
- Known for: First 100 IVF babies of Nepal & Uttar Pradesh
- Medical career
- Profession: Gynaecologist, infertility specialist
- Institutions: Medical Council of India, Indian Medical Association
- Sub-specialties: Obstetrics, Gynaecology

Jaideep Malhotra is an Indian gynaecologist and infertility specialist with expertise in ultrasonography. She is the founder of the Rainbow IVF Centre and also serves as the director of the hospital. Malhotra received an award from the Prime minister of Nepal in recognition of the first 100 babies born through in vitro fertilisation (IVF) in Nepal.

== Early life and education ==
Malhotra was born on 11 September 1960 in Meerut, Uttar Pradesh. She studied medicine (MBBS) at AMU Institute Of Ophthalmology, Aligarh in 1983 and later, she completed her post doctoral studies in Obstetrics and Gynecology from the same college.

== Career ==
Malhotra is an Indian gynaecologist and reproductive medicine specialist associated with Rainbow IVF Centre in Agra.

== Leadership positions ==
- 2018 - President of the Federation of Obstetric and Gynaecological Societies of India (FOGSI) in 2018.
- 2019 - President of the Indian Society for Assisted Reproduction (ISAR).
- President of the Indian Society of Prenatal Diagnosis and Therapy (ISPAT).
- 2021 - President of the South Asian Federation of Menopause Societies (SAFOMS).
- Member of the Reproductive Medicine Committee of the International Federation of Gynecology and Obstetrics (FIGO).
