= Siyasat Jadid =

Indian Urdu-language daily newspaper

- Type: Daily Broadsheet
- Editor-in-chief: Mohammad Irshad Ilmi
- Founded: 1953
- Language: Urdu
- Headquarters: Kanpur, Uttar Pradesh, India
- Circulation: 60,000
- Website: siyasatjadid.in

Siyasat Jadid is an Indian Urdu language daily newspaper based in Kanpur. Registered in 1953, the newspaper is considered to be "one of Uttar Pradesh's oldest Urdu dailies".
