= King George's Medical University =

University in Lucknow, Uttar Pradesh, India

- राजा जॉर्ज आयुर्विज्ञान विश्वविद्यालय
- Former name: King George's Medical College (1905–2002)
- Motto: Sincerity-Service-Sacrifice
- Type: State university
- Established: 1905 (121 years ago)
- Founder: Raja Sir Tassaduq Rasul Khan
- Accreditation: NAAC A++
- Affiliations: UGC, NMC, DCI, INC
- Endowment: ₹1,640 crore (US$170 million) (2024-25)
- Chancellor: Governor of Uttar Pradesh
- Vice-Chancellor: Dr. Soniya Nityanand
- Faculty: 434
- Students: 2,537
- Undergraduates: 1,583
- Postgraduates: 895
- Doctoral students: 50
- Location: Shahmina Road, Chowk, Lucknow, Uttar Pradesh, India; 26°52′09″N 80°54′58″E
- Campus: 24.711 acres (10.000 ha); Urban
- Colors
- Nickname: KGMU
- Website: kgmu.org
- Government of Uttar Pradesh

Organisation
- Type: Teaching hospital

Services
- Standards: NMC
- Emergency department: Level I Trauma Center
- Beds: 4,000

Helipads
- Helipad: No

King George's Medical University (KGMU) is a public medical university located in Lucknow, Uttar Pradesh, India. It was formerly a constituent medical college of the University of Lucknow and was separated and raised to the status of a state university by an Act passed by the Government of Uttar Pradesh on 16 September 2002. It is the only government medical institution to have been awarded the NAAC A++ grade, in the state of Uttar Pradesh.

The university has about 1250 undergraduate students (including 280 dental students) and 450 postgraduate students.

About 250 students a year are admitted to the four-and-a-half-year course of study for the degree of M.B.B.S.

== History ==
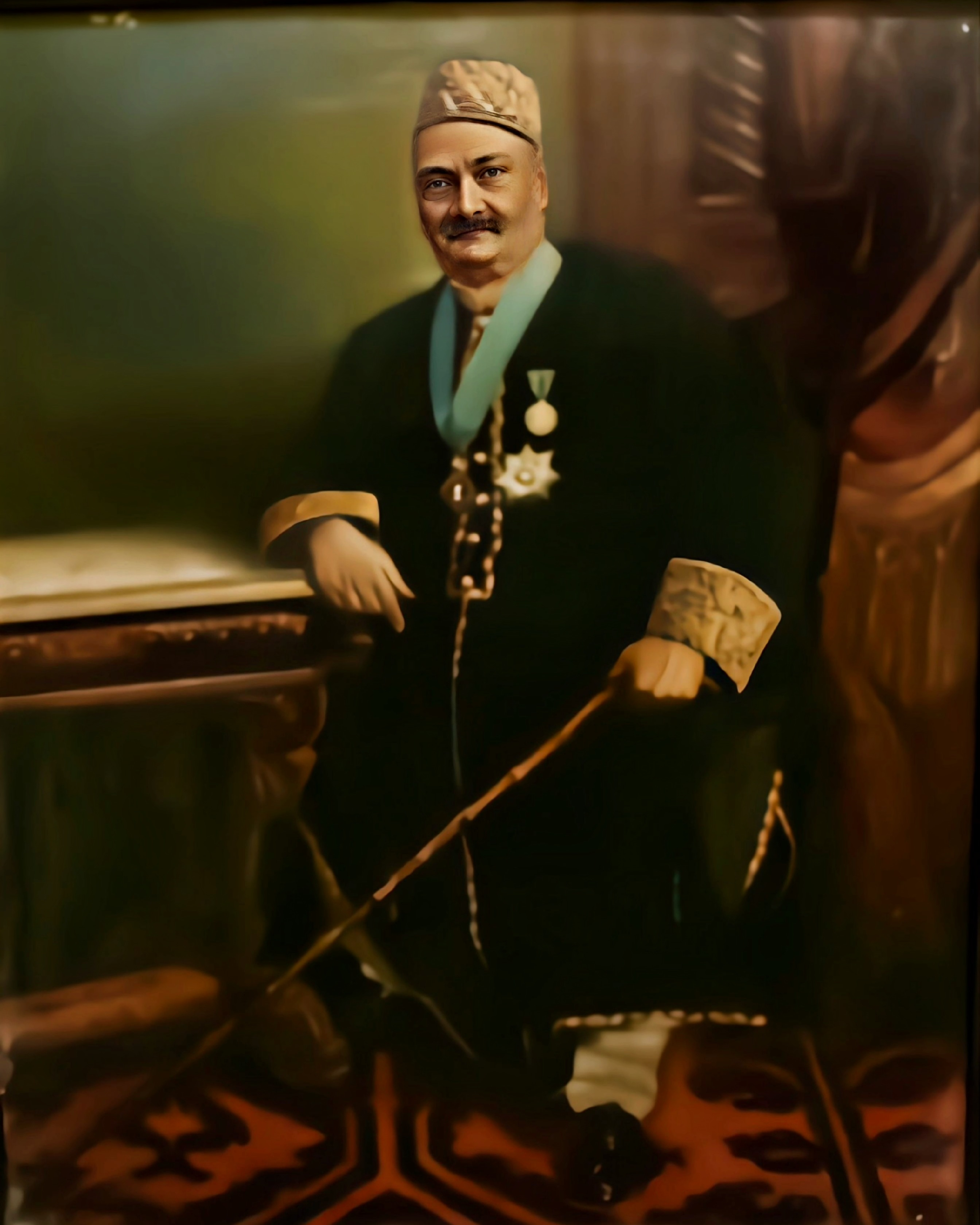
Raja Sir Tassaduq Rasul Khan K.C.S.I., Kt., C.S.I., M.L.C., the Taluqdar of Jahangirabad Raj.

King George's Medical College (University) was founded on the initiative of His Highness Raja Sir Tassaduq Rasul Khan, KCSI Kt CSI MLC, of Jahangirabad Raj, United Provinces to commemorate the 1905 visit to India of King George V. The foundation stone was laid by King George V in 1906; the first session started in October 1911, and the hospital's construction was completed in 1913 at a total cost of ₹30 lakhs. The first batch of students qualified as doctors in 1916. The college was initially affiliated with the University of Allahabad until 1921.

The King George's Medical College, along with Canning College and Isabella Thoburn College, became the constituent institutions of the University of Lucknow in 1921. In 1983, the Government of Uttar Pradesh took over the college under The King George's Medical College and the Gandhi Memorial and Associated Hospitals (Taking Over) Act, 1983 (U.P. Act No. 10 of 1983). The takeover was repealed in 1998, and the college was re-transferred to the University of Lucknow on 28 March 1998 through U.P. Act No. 15 of 1998. It was subsequently separated from the University of Lucknow and elevated to the status of a state university in 2002.

In 2002 the Government of Uttar Pradesh, led by Mayawati of the Bahujan Samaj Party (BSP), granted university status the college and renamed it Chhatrapati Shahuji Maharaj Medical University (CSMMU), under the Uttar Pradesh Chhatrapati Shahuji Medical University Act, 2002. In August 2003 Mulayam Singh Yadav of the Samajwadi Party (SP) replaced Mayawati and became Chief Minister of Uttar Pradesh. Two months later, in October 2003, the name of the university was changed to King George's Medical University (KGMU) by the Uttar Pradesh Chhartrapati Shahuji Maharaj Medical University (Second Amendment) Act, 2003.

Name-changing continued. In 2007, after the BSP won the Uttar Pradesh Legislative Assembly election and Mayawati returned to office, the name of the institution reverted to CSMMU. When control returned to the SP in the 2012 election, Akhilesh Yadav's government returned the name of the university the current "King George Medical University".

Similar changes occurred for the dental faculty. The faculty was established in 1949 as a section of the ENT department; raised to a separate department in 1950, it moved to a new building in 1952. When the university was established in 2002, the dental department became the Dental College, a constituent college of the university. Two years later, under the Uttar Pradesh King George's University of Dental Science Act, 2004, the Dental College was raised to the status of a state university named the "U.P. King George's University of Dental Science". In 2007, the government reverted this decision and the U.P. King George's University of Dental Science again became simply a Faculty of Dental Sciences, as it was at the establishment of the university.

After attaining university status, it also functioned as an affiliating university for several medical colleges, including Autonomous Medical College, Bahraich, until the academic year 2021–2022, after which the affiliated colleges were transferred to the newly established Atal Bihari Vajpayee Medical University.

== Rankings ==
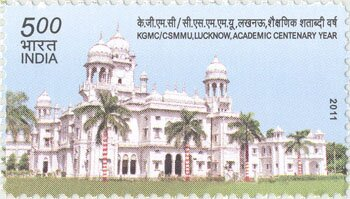
Stamp of India 2011 KGMC Chhatrapati Shahuji Maharaj Medical University Lucknow

University and college rankings

General – international
- Times (World) (2021): 601–800
- Times (Asia) (2021): 139

General – India
- NIRF (Overall) (2022): 75
- NIRF (Universities) (2022): 50

Medical – India
- NIRF (2024): 19
- Government colleges
- Outlook India (2022): 4

Dental – India
- NIRF (2022): 5

The National Institutional Ranking Framework (NIRF) has ranked the university 50 among universities in India in 2022, 11th among medical colleges, 5th among dental colleges, and 75th overall. It was ranked fourth among government medical colleges in India in 2022 by Outlook India.

In 2025, NIRF ranked it 8th among medical colleges.

== Notable people ==
The University has a list of its prestigious alumni. As of now, the University has given 1 Padma Vibhushan, 6 Padma Bhushan, 29 Padma Shri and 45 BC Roy awardees to the nation.

=== Notable alumni ===
- Belle Monappa Hegde
- Manik Saha
- B. K. Anand
- Sanduk Ruit
- Rajendra Prasad
- Ravi Kant
- Anil Kohli
- N. N. Wig
- Nuzhat Husain
- Mahesh Prasad Mehray
- Ravindra Nanda
- Autar Singh Paintal
- Sunil Pradhan
- Krishan Chandra Singhal
- Badri Nath Tandon
- Mahdi Hasan
- Naresh Trehan
- Prem Nath Wahi
- Shyam Swarup Agarwal
- Balram Bhargava
- Priyadarshi Ranjan
- Soniya Nityanand
- Ashish Kumar Bhutani

=== Notable faculty ===
- Shyam Swarup Agarwal
- Mahendra Bhandari
- U. C. Chaturvedi
- Saroj Chooramani Gopal
- Mansoor Hasan
- Rajendra Prasad
- Ravi Kant
- Shiv Narain Kureel
- M. C. Pant
- Jagdish Narain Sinha
- Trilok Chandra Goel
- Nuzhat Husain

== See also ==
- Medical college in India
- Healthcare in India
- Sanjay Gandhi Postgraduate Institute of Medical Sciences
- Uttar Pradesh University of Medical Sciences
- Dr. Ram Manohar Lohia Institute of Medical Sciences
