= Government Medical College, Haldwani =

Medical college in Haldwani, Uttarakhand, India

Coordinates: 29.206622°N 79.521403°E

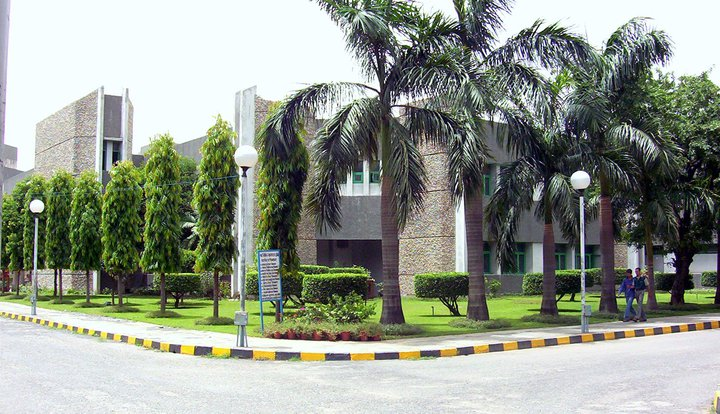
- Type: Medical & Research Institute
- Established: 1997; 29 years ago
- Affiliations: Hemwati Nandan Bahuguna Uttarakhand Medical Education University, NMC
- Principal: Dr. Govind Singh Titiyal
- Undergraduates: 125 per year
- Postgraduates: 65 per year
- Location: Haldwani, Uttarakhand, India
- Campus: Urban
- Nickname: GMC Haldwani
- Website: gmchld.org

Government Medical College, Haldwani (formerly known as Uttarakhand Forest Hospital Trust Medical College) is a medical college in Haldwani, Uttarakhand, India. It was established in 1997. The college is affiliated with Hemwati Nandan Bahuguna Uttarakhand Medical Education University, Dehradun. Also known as GMC Haldwani, it is one of the fast-growing residential and co-educational medical colleges in India.

It is recognised by the National Medical Commission.

== History ==
The foundation of the medical college was laid on 19 March 1997, by Shri Romesh Bhandari, the then governor of Uttar Pradesh. In May 2004, the college started its first intake of 100 MBBS students.

By April 2010, "Uttarakhand Forest Hospital Trust" had been dissolved. All of the five institutions operational under the trust had been taken over by Department of Medical Education (Government of Uttarakhand) to operate under the name of Government Medical College, Haldwani from 1 May 2010.

== Admission process ==
For undergraduate courses, entry to this institute is purely on the basis of merit obtained by students in competitive examination: NEET Fifteen percent of the students are admitted via the All India Quota, whereas 85% seats are filled via a state Quota.

The same implies for post graduate courses - 50% PG seats are filled through the All India Post Graduate Medical Entrance Examination while the other 50% are filled through a state level entrance exam.

== Courses ==
As in November 2013, the college conducted MBBS and MD/M.S. courses with a student intake of 100 and 65 respectively.

=== Undergraduate courses ===
- MBBS - 5 1/2 years (including one year compulsory rotating internship training)
- 1st Professional (2 semesters): subjects taught are anatomy, physiology, biochemistry and community medicine.
- 2nd Professional (3 semesters): subjects taught are pharmacology, pathology, microbiology and forensic medicine, community medicine, surgery, paediatrics, obstetrics and gynaecology, orthopaedics, ophthalmology, otolaryngology, dermatology, psychiatry, and radiology.
- 3rd Professional Part - I (2 semesters), subjects taught - community medicine, ENT, ophthalmology, medicine, surgery, orthopaedics, obstetrics and gynaecology, otolaryngology, paediatrics, ophthalmology, medicine, anaesthesiology, dentistry, radiology, and radiotherapy.
- 3rd Professional Part - II (2 semesters), covers medicine, paediatrics, obstetrics and gynaecology, and surgery including orthopaedics.

=== Postgraduate courses ===
Government Medical College, Haldwani is the first post graduate college in Uttarakhand, recognised by the Medical Council of India and the Government of India. Currently the medical college offers 65 post graduate seats in various departments.

== Campus ==
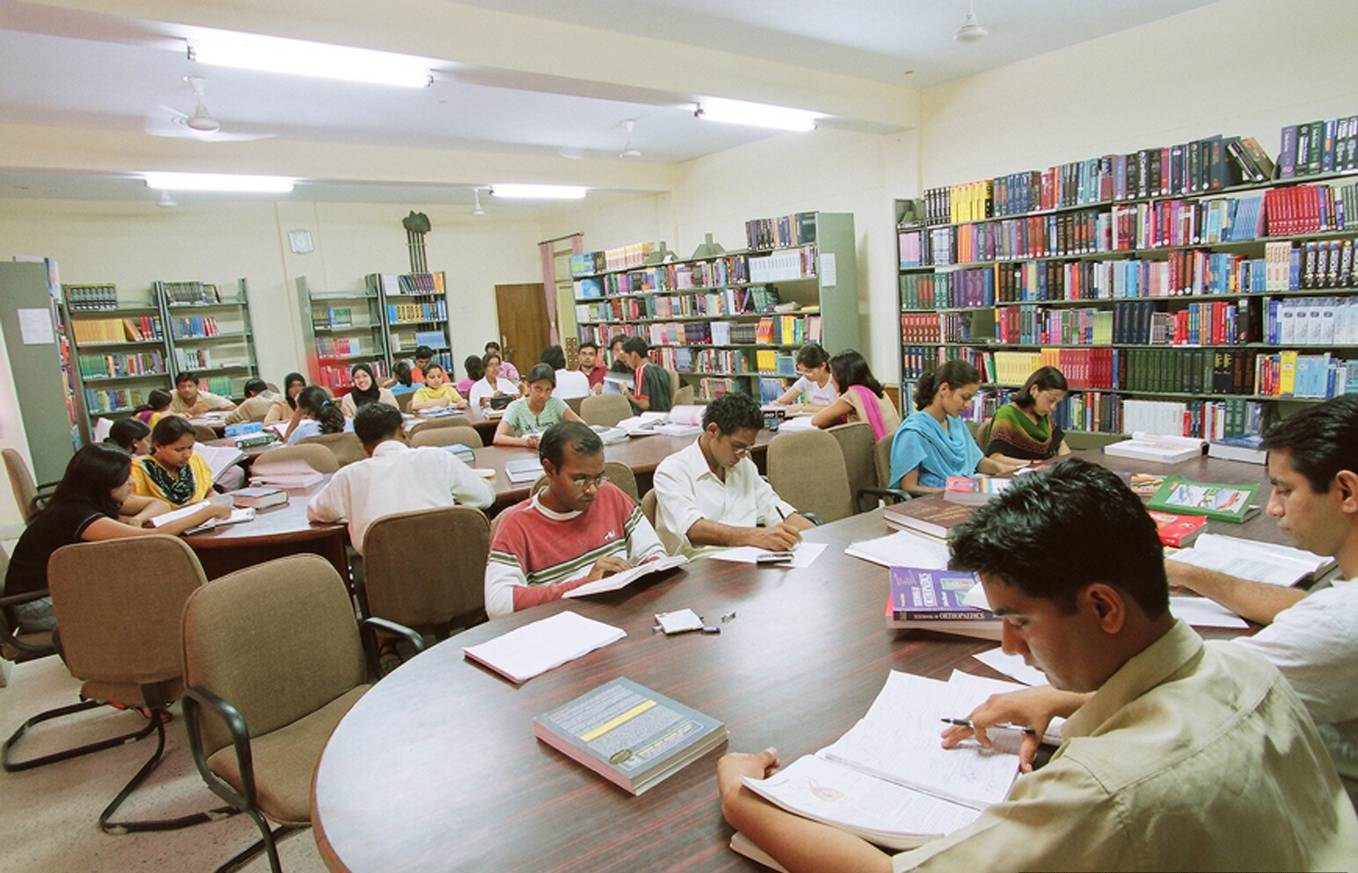
An inside view of the library.

The main campus covers an area of 90 acres (0.364 km^{2}) and is situated at Rampur Road, Haldwani.
The inside of the campus is neat and endowed with wide roads, lawns, residential complexes, sports complexes, auditorium besides the administrative and teaching blocks.
There are separate hostels for each year (boys and girls) with a capacity of 150 students each.

== Associated hospitals and medical services ==
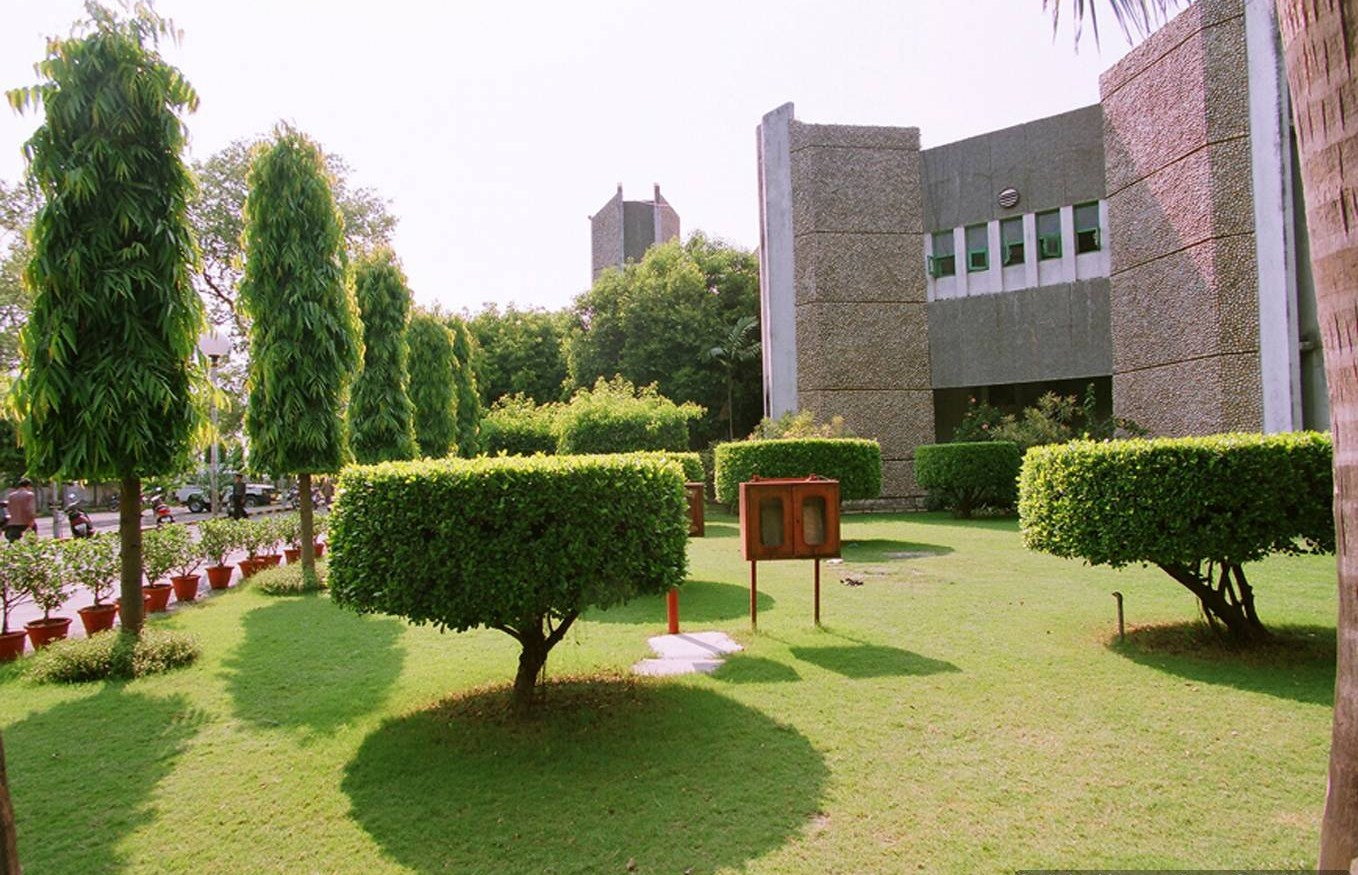
Dr. STM Hospital

GMC Haldwani has two hospitals associated with it - Dr. Susheela Tiwari Memorial Hospital and SRM Cancer Hospital & Research Center, - to educate its medical students and for continuously upgrading the health standards of the state of Uttarakhand.

Dr. Susheela Tiwari Memorial Hospital became functional on 26 December 1995, but was formally inaugurated on 28 July 1996. The hospital is continuously being expanded and upgraded to keep pace with both the ever-increasing dependence of the local and regional populace on its services as well as to keep in tandem with the advancements in the medical field. Currently, it has a capacity of 600 beds.

Swami Rama Cancer Hospital and Research Center is functional under Government Medical College, Haldwani. It was envisioned and initiated as a State of Art Cancer Center and was formally inaugurated on 22 February 2010. There are plans to upgrade this centre to the status of the Uttarakhand State Cancer Institute. However, currently the only functional department in the Swami Rama Cancer Hospital happens to be the department of radiotherapy. The lack of oncological disciplines of medical oncology, surgical oncology, haematological oncology, gynaecological oncology and pediatric oncology is acutely affecting the population of the state at present.

== Departments ==
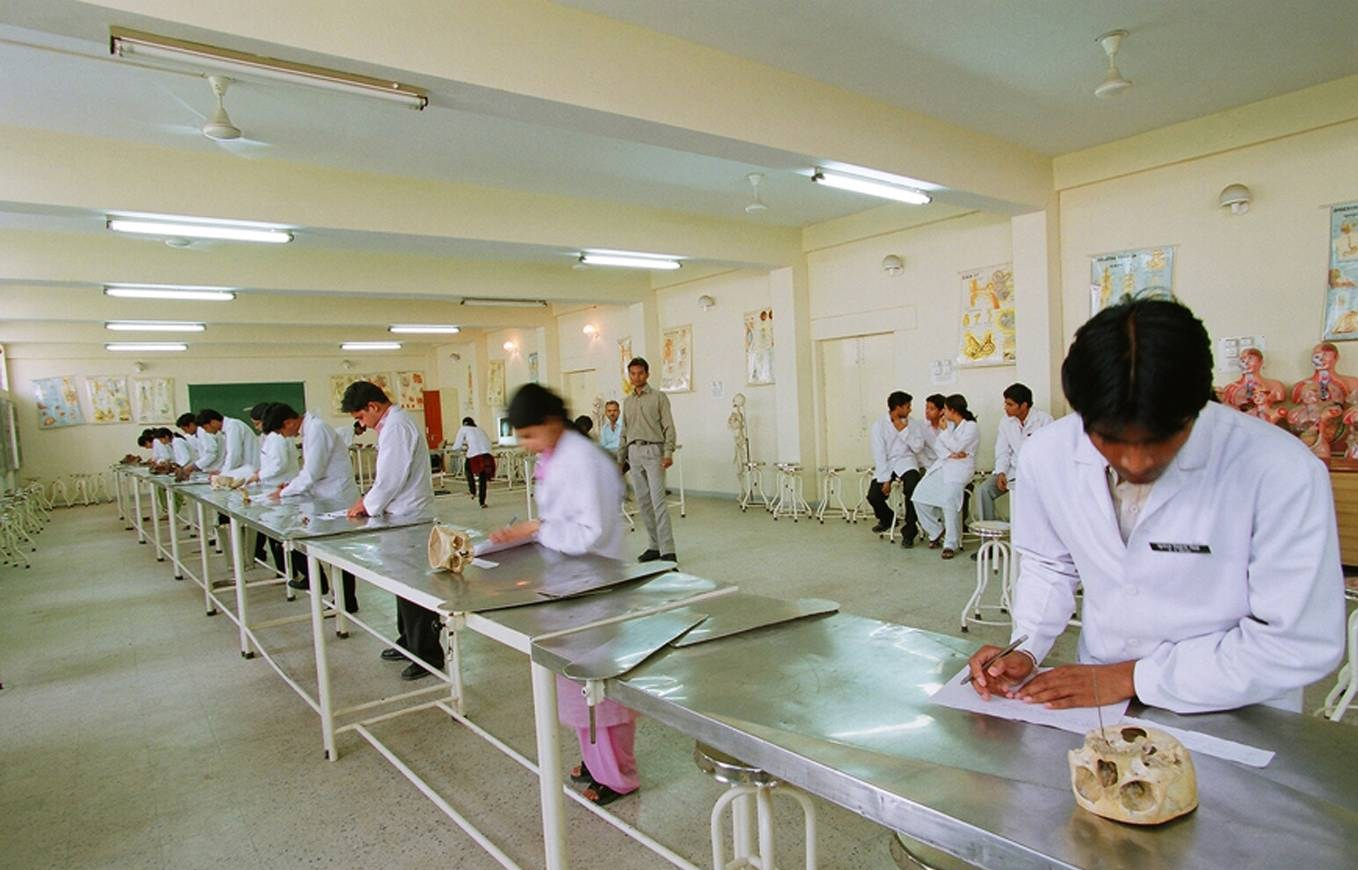
Anatomy Lab

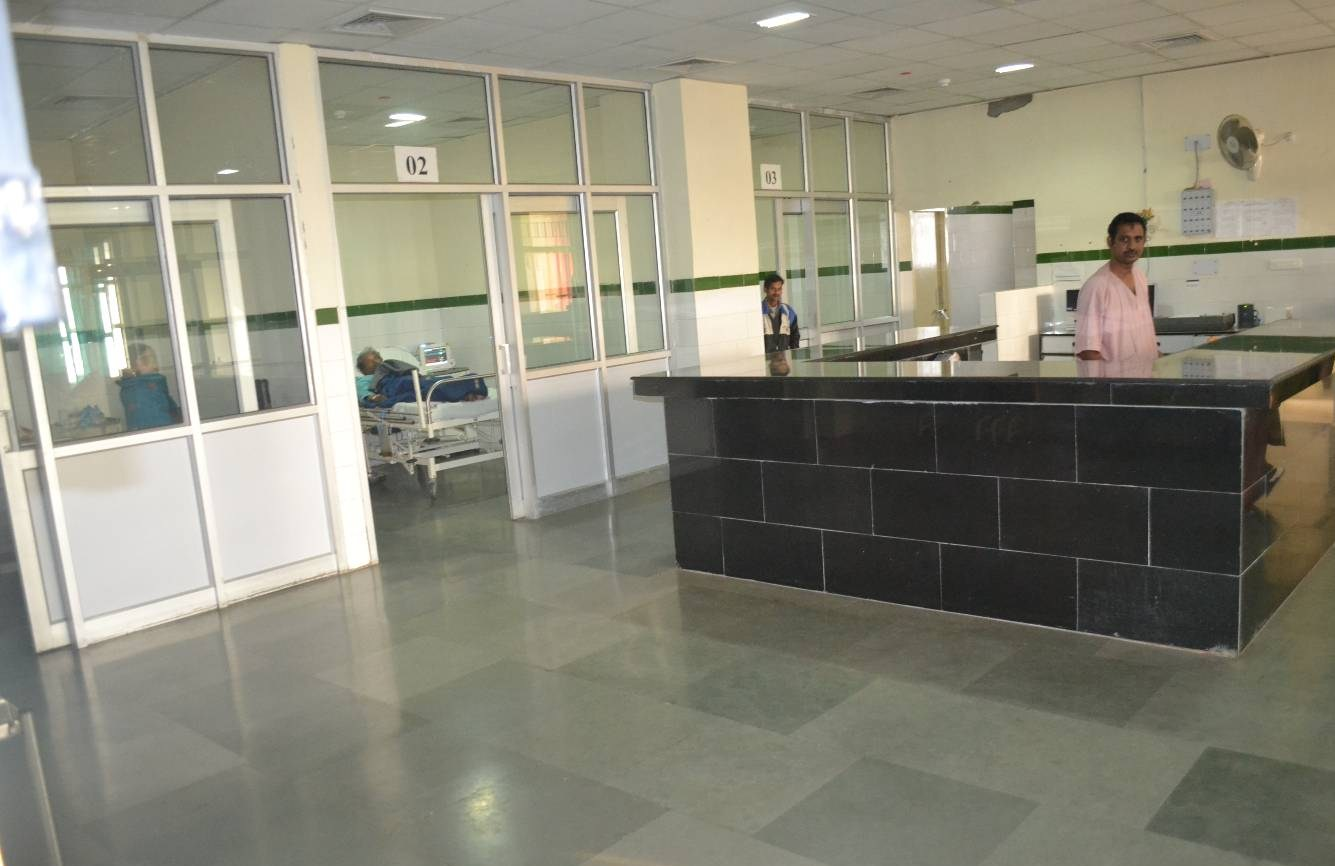
Surgery ICU

- Anaesthesiology
- Anatomy
- Biochemistry
- Community Medicine
- Dentistry
- Dermatology
- Forensic Medicine
- General Medicine
- General Surgery
- Gynaecology
- Leprosy
- Microbiology
- Obstetrics
- Ophthalmology
- Orthopaedics
- Otolaryngology
- Pathology
- Pediatrics
- Pharmacology
- Physiology
- Psychiatry
- Radiology
- Venereology

== See also ==
- List of medical colleges in India
