= Hemwati Nandan Bahuguna Uttarakhand Medical Education University =

State university in Uttarakhand, India

Coordinates: 30.34609°N 77.85758°E

- Motto in English: Learn to Serve
- Type: Public
- Established: 2014; 12 years ago
- Affiliations: UGC
- Chancellor: Governor of Uttarakhand
- Vice-Chancellor: Dr. Bhanu Duggal
- Location: Dehradun, Uttarakhand, India
- Website: www.hnbumu.ac.in

Hemwati Nandan Bahuguna Uttarakhand Medical Education University (HNBUMU) is a medical education state university located at Dehradun, Uttarakhand, India. It was established in 2014 by the Government of Uttarakhand through the Hemwati Nandan Bahuguna Medical Education University Act, 2014. It has jurisdiction on all medical, dental, nursing and para-medical college in the state of Uttarakhand.

== Affiliated colleges ==
As of 2022, affiliated colleges include four medical colleges, one dental college, 39 nursing colleges, 29 paramedical colleges and two "other courses" colleges. Notable colleges include:

- Government Doon Medical College
- Government Medical College, Haldwani
- Soban Singh Jeena Government Institute of Medical Sciences and Research, Almora
- Veer Chandra Singh Garhwali Government Institute of Medical Science and Research, Srinagar
