= Dr. Ram Manohar Lohia Institute of Medical Sciences =

Medical school in Lucknow, India

- Motto in English: May All be Healthy
- Type: State university
- Established: 2006 (20 years ago)
- Accreditation: National Medical Commission
- Endowment: ₹324 crore (US$34 million) (2024-25)
- Chairman: Chief Secretary, Government of Uttar Pradesh
- Director: Dr. C. M. Singh
- Academic staff: 268
- Students: 824
- Undergraduates: 610
- Postgraduates: 204
- Doctoral students: 10
- Location: Gomti Nagar, Lucknow, Uttar Pradesh, 226010, India
- Campus: 50.5 acres (20.4 ha); Urban
- Website: drrmlims.ac.in

The Dr. Ram Manohar Lohia Institute of Medical Sciences (Dr. RMLIMS) is a medical institute with state university status located in Lucknow, Uttar Pradesh, India. The institute offers MBBS, Bachelor of Science in Nursing BSN, DM, MCh, MD and Ph.D. degrees. It was established in 2006 and was affiliated with King George's Medical University till 2018. On 12 September 2018, it was notified as an state university with degree-granting status and privileges.

== History ==
=== Establishment ===
As an autonomous institute of Government of Uttar Pradesh, it was established along the lines of the SGPGIMS in Lucknow and was given an autonomous status in 2006. Department of Obstetrics and Gynecology and Department of Pediatrics housed in Ram Prakash Gupta Mother and Child State Referral Hospital at Shaheed Path, Lucknow, near new campus.

=== Starting of degree courses ===
After its establishment in 2006, in 2012 it got National Medical Commission's approval to start post graduate and higher degree courses. In 2017 it got National Medical Commission's approval to run MBBS degree course. It was started as an affiliated college of King George's Medical University.

=== University status ===
In 2015, Government of Uttar Pradesh start upgrading it into an State university by passing Dr. Ram Manohar Lohia Institute of Medical Sciences Act 2015 in assembly. But after not getting approval from Governor of Uttar Pradesh for Dr. Ram Manohar Lohia Institute of Medical Sciences Act 2015, the cabinet in 2018 included suggestions given by governor and again started the process by preparing an amendment act. This time the act was approved by Governor of Uttar Pradesh and was notified on 12 September 2018.

== Courses ==
Currently available MBBS, BSc Nursing, Short Term student Training for Life sciences, technical & Project work for B Sc & M Sc students, Ph.D Program, Internship for medical students and PG Degree courses (MD/DM/MCh).

== Location ==
The institute is situated in Vibhuti Khand in Gomti Nagar locality of Lucknow. The new campus of the institute is situated in Saheed Path, Ardonamau, Gomti Nagar, Lucknow, 226002.

== Departments ==
Multispeciality Departments of Dr.RMLIMS:

- Anesthesiology
- Cardiology
- Gastrosurgery
- Gastromedicine
- Microbiology
- Nephrology
- Neurology
- Neurosurgery
- Nuclear Medicine
- Pathology
- Radiodiagnosis
- Radiation Oncology
- Surgical Oncology
- Urology
- Medical Oncology
- Cardiovascular & Thoracic Surgery
- Emergency Medicine
- Physical Medicine & Rehabilitation
- Pediatric Surgery
- Respiratory Medicine
- Obstetrics and Gynecology
- Ophthalmology
- Physical Medicine and Rehabilitation
- ENT
- Dentistry
