= ESIC =

ESIC may refer to:

== Governing bodies ==
- Employees' State Insurance (Employees State Insurance Corporation), statutory body in India
- Esports Integrity Commission, regulatory body in esports

== Universities ==
- ESIC University (Escuela Superior de Ingenieros Comerciales), university in Pozuelo de Alarcón, Spain
- ESIC Medical College (disambiguation), Employees State Insurance Corporation Medical College, India
  - ESIC Medical College, Alwar, medical college in Alwar, India
  - ESIC Medical College, Faridabad, medical college in Faridabad, India
  - ESIC Medical College, Gulbarga, medical college in Gulbarga, India
  - ESIC Medical College, Kolkata, medical college in Kolkata, India
  - ESIC Medical College and PGIMSR, Kalaburagi, medical college in Kalaburagi, India
  - Government Medical College, Kollam, formerly known as ESIC Medical College, Parippally
- SAMIS-ESIC School of Information and Communication, college in Amparibem, Madagascar

== Other uses ==
- Early stage innovation company, concept in the Australian tax code designed to attract early-stage investment capital from investors

== See also ==
- ESIC Nagar metro station, Mumbai Metro, Mumbai, India
- ESI Hospital metro station, Delhi
- ESI Hospital metro station (Hyderabad)
