= ESIC Medical College =

ESIC Medical College may refer to one of several Employees State Insurance Corporation (Employees' State Insurance) medical colleges in India:

- ESIC Medical College, Alwar, Rajasthan
- ESIC Medical College, Bengaluru, Karnataka
- ESIC Medical College, Coimbatore, Tamil Nadu
- ESIC Medical College, Faridabad, Haryana
- ESIC Medical College, Guwahati, Assam
- ESIC Medical College, Joka, West Bengal
- ESIC Medical College and Hospital, Patna, Bihar
- ESIC Medical College and PGIMSR, Kalaburagi, Karnataka

== See also ==
- ESIC (disambiguation)
- ESI Hospital metro station, Delhi
- ESI Hospital metro station (Hyderabad)
- ESIC Nagar metro station, Mumbai
