= Climate finance in the United States =

Climate financing in the US

Climate finance in the United States involves the mobilization of public and private funds to support efforts to mitigate and adapt to climate change, with a focus on leveraging market-based mechanisms, policy incentives, and investments in clean energy and resilience initiatives to meet domestic and global climate goals.

== Overview ==
Climate finance in the United States has evolved significantly over the past few decades, shaped by international agreements, domestic policy actions, and private sector involvement. The U.S. approach to climate finance is built on the premise of leveraging economic incentives and market-based mechanisms to address climate change. This article explores the U.S. involvement in global climate agreements, particularly the Paris Agreement, and breaks down the commitments the U.S. made. It also examines the outcomes of U.S. climate finance efforts, focusing on key policies, acts, and financial commitments that have shaped the landscape of climate finance domestically and globally.

While public funding plays an important role in U.S. climate finance, the majority of climate-related investment in the United States is provided by private sources. According to the International Energy Agency, most clean energy and low-carbon investment in advanced economies is financed through private capital, including corporate balance sheets, project finance, bank lending, and capital markets, with public policy primarily serving to reduce risk and improve investment incentives. Public climate policies such as tax credits, loan guarantees, and regulatory standards are therefore designed not only to fund projects directly but also to mobilize significantly larger volumes of private investment toward mitigation and resilience objectives.

== U.S. financial commitments to the Paris Agreement ==
Some financial commitments are included in the U.S. nationally determined contribution to the Paris Agreement. The U.S. pledged $3 billion to the Green Climate Fund, with the aim of supporting climate mitigation and adaptation projects in developing countries. By 2016, the U.S. had already contributed $500 million. Technology Transfer and Capacity Building: The U.S. committed to facilitating technology transfer and capacity-building initiatives aimed at helping developing countries meet their climate goals. This included financial and technical assistance under the broader framework of the Paris Agreement.

== U.S. climate finance outcomes ==
=== Policy and legislative acts ===
The U.S. has enacted several key pieces of legislation that support climate finance and clean energy investment. The Inflation Reduction Act (IRA) of 2022: This landmark legislation allocates $369 billion in funding for clean energy and climate-related initiatives. The IRA provides tax credits for renewable energy development, electric vehicle adoption, and energy efficiency improvements. It represents one of the largest climate investments in U.S. history and is intended to drive private sector investment in clean energy technologies. Investment and Production Tax Credits (ITC and PTC). The U.S. has long used financial incentives such as the ITC and PTC to promote renewable energy development. The ITC provides a significant tax credit for solar energy investments, while the PTC incentivizes energy production from renewable sources like wind.

==== Policies to Mobilize Private Capital ====
Tax credits and production incentives are explicitly designed to "crowd in" private investment in renewable energy, storage, and low-carbon technologies. The Inflation Reduction Act (IRA) and the Bipartisan Infrastructure Law employ long-term predictable incentives, loan guarantees, and public co-investment to lower the risk and cost of capital for investments in climate finance projects. Empirical studies provide evidence that public policy and concessional finance can mobilize significant private capital flows into clean energy.

=== Financial commitments ===
==== Public Climate Finance ====
The U.S. has played a central role in mobilizing climate finance, both domestically and internationally: Green Climate Fund (GCF). The U.S. initially pledged $3 billion to the GCF, aimed at helping developing nations mitigate and adapt to climate change. However, this commitment was disrupted by the Trump administration's decision to halt further contributions after the initial $500 million. Private Sector Engagement. U.S. climate finance efforts have been bolstered by private sector involvement. Companies like Microsoft, Amazon, and Tesla have made significant commitments to carbon neutrality and investment in carbon capture and renewable energy projects. Additionally, financial institutions such as BlackRock have pledged to increase investments in green technologies, underscoring the role of private capital in climate finance.

The U.S. Department of Energy's Loan Programs Office has been especially prominent in using federal credit support to enable private sector financing for innovative clean technologies such as advanced batteries, hydrogen infrastructure, and carbon management projects.

==== Private Climate Finance ====
Private climate finance in the United States is delivered through a diverse set of financial instruments that support the deployment of clean energy, the transition of corporate operations, and investment in low-carbon technologies. These instruments operate across capital markets, commercial banking, and private investment funds, and together constitute a substantial portion of national climate-related investment.

=== Instruments of Private Climate Finance ===
==== Green, Sustainability, and Transition Bonds ====
Green bonds have become one of the most widely used private financing instruments for climate-related projects in the United States. Corporate issuers, municipal governments, and financial institutions use green bonds to finance renewable energy, energy efficiency, clean transport, and resilient infrastructure. Empirical evidence suggests that green bond issuance is associated with lower carbon emissions from issuing jurisdictions and may offer modest financing advantages, such as lower yields or broader investor bases.

==== Commercial Bank Lending and Sustainability-Linked Loan ====
Commercial banks play a critical role in financing low-carbon infrastructure and corporate decarbonization activities. Sustainability-linked loans (SLLs), in which interest rates adjust based on achievement of emissions reduction or efficiency targets, have expanded rapidly among U.S. corporations. Major U.S. banks have announced commitments to scale climate-aligned lending, though recent political debates have shaped participation in voluntary net-zero banking alliances.

==== Project Finance and Infrastructure Investment ====
Project finance remains a core mechanism for developing utility-scale solar, wind, grid modernization, energy storage, and emerging low-carbon industrial assets. In the U.S., project finance draws from commercial bank lending, tax equity financing, and institutional investors through infrastructure funds and public–private partnerships. Long-term policy incentives like the Investment Tax Credit (ITC) and Production Tax Credit (PTC), reduce project risk and leverage significant private capital toward clean energy deployment.

==== Private Equity and Corporate Investment ====
Private equity firms invest in mature climate-related sectors such as renewable energy development, electrified transport, building efficiency, and waste-to-energy initiatives. Many institutional investors channel climate capital through private equity infrastructure strategies aimed at long-term, stable returns. Corporations also make substantial direct investments in decarbonization—such as clean energy procurement, fleet electrification, and supply chain decarbonization—forming one of the largest categories of private climate investment nationally.

==== Venture Capital and Early-Stage Finance ====
Although smaller in volume relative to project finance and corporate investment, venture capital (VC) funds a significant share of early-stage climate technology innovation in areas such as batteries, hydrogen, carbon capture, and grid software. U.S. climate-tech VC investment grew markedly between 2015 and 2023, reflecting increased investor interest and expanding federal incentives.

Academic analyses note that VC plays a crucial role in developing frontier technologies but faces structural challenges due to long commercialization timelines and high capital intensity.

=== Outcomes and global impact ===
Market-Based Mechanisms: The U.S. has been a leader in market-based mechanisms like cap-and-trade systems, with regional initiatives such as California's cap-and-trade program and the Regional Greenhouse Gas Initiative (RGGI) demonstrating the effectiveness of market incentives to reduce greenhouse gas emissions.

Voluntary Carbon Markets: The U.S. has increasingly supported voluntary carbon markets, where businesses can purchase carbon offsets to compensate for their emissions. This has encouraged innovation and investment in carbon capture and reforestation projects.

Bipartisan Climate Finance Initiatives: Bipartisan support has emerged for climate-related financial policies, particularly regarding infrastructure resilience and adaptation to climate impacts.

Internationally, U.S.-supported multilateral initiatives also deploy blended finance to encourage private investment in developing-country mitigation and adaptation projects.

== Challenges ==
Despite these advances, the U.S. has faced challenges in maintaining consistent climate finance policies, especially during periods of political transition. The Trump administration's withdrawal from the Paris Agreement in 2017 marked a setback, reducing U.S. contributions to global climate finance and stalling domestic emission reduction efforts.

=== Re-entry into the Paris Agreement ===
In 2021, the Biden administration rejoined the Paris Agreement, committing to more ambitious climate goals, including a 50-52% reduction in emissions by 2030 compared to 2005 levels. This re-entry revitalized U.S. contributions to international climate finance and reignited domestic efforts to curb emissions.

The U.S. has taken substantial steps toward addressing climate change through both policy and financial commitments. The Paris Agreement marked a pivotal moment for U.S. climate finance, with commitments to reduce emissions and support global efforts through financial and technical assistance. Despite setbacks during the Trump administration, the U.S. has renewed its commitment to international climate goals under President Biden, leveraging both public and private sector engagement to drive climate action. The future of U.S. climate finance will depend on continued political support, private sector innovation, and international cooperation to meet the challenges posed by global climate change.

=== Climate finance at Climate Week NYC ===
During Climate Week NYC 2024, a significant focus was placed on climate finance commitments, with over 600 events hosted across the city, making it one of the largest annual gatherings dedicated to climate action. Major players in this event included institutional investors, banks, and insurers who discussed financing the transition to a low-carbon economy and scaling up investments in clean energy solutions.

Additionally, other organizations organized sessions on voluntary carbon markets and disaster insurance as essential mechanisms to accelerate climate action through financial tools. Discussions also covered scaling investments in tropical forest conservation and integrating climate considerations into corporate strategies, showcasing the strong participation of private sector actors.

=== Limitations and Risks of Reliance on Private Climate Finance ===
Despite the scale of private finance, relying solely on private capital for climate finance in the United States presents several challenges. Private investment is highly sensitive to market conditions, interest rates, and policy uncertainty. Recent volatility in climate-tech venture funding and shifts in institutional investors' climate commitments demonstrate the cyclical nature of private climate finance. Research indicates that high capital intensity, long development timelines, and uncertain revenue models create barriers for private investment in emerging low-carbon technologies, especially those in heavy industry, carbon removal, and long-duration storage.

Another limitation is the uneven distribution of private investment across sectors. Most private capital flows into mitigation technologies, particularly renewable energy and clean mobility, while adaptation projects, community resilience efforts, and nature-based solutions receive comparatively little private financing. Climate Policy Initiative analysis shows that private adaptation finance globally remains a small fraction of total flows, due in part to low expected financial returns and the difficulty of monetizing resilience benefits.

==== Structural Issues ====
Private climate finance is also constrained by structural issues such as information gaps, technology risk, and difficulties in building project pipelines that will pay off. The OECD notes that mobilizing private finance requires significant public-sector de-risking, regulatory stability, and technical assistance, all of which are costly and complex to administer. In the U.S., inconsistent federal climate policy and political polarization can increase the perceived risk of long-term low-carbon investments, raising financing costs for developers and investors.

Several scholars also caution that private capital alone cannot meet national or global climate goals. Studies in Climate and Development and by the IMF emphasize that many essential climate investments—particularly those in adaptation, community resilience, and early-stage innovation—yield significant social benefits but limited private returns, necessitating sustained public funding and policy support.
