= African Petroleum Producers' Organization =

Organization of African countries

- Abbreviation: APPO
- Headquarters: Brazzaville, Republic of Congo
- Website: https://apposecretariat.org/
- Formerly called: African Petroleum Producers Association

African Petroleum Producers Organization (APPO) (French: Organisation Africaine des Producteurs Pétroliers, Portuguese: Organização dos Produtores Africanos de Petróleo, Arabic: المنظمة الأفريقية لمنتجي البترول) is an organization of African countries producing petroleum. It was created on January 27, 1987, in Lagos, Nigeria, to serve as a platform for cooperation and harmonization of efforts, collaboration, sharing of knowledge and skills among African oil producing countries. The headquarters of the organization is in Brazzaville in the Congo. The Organization changed its name from African Petroleum Producers Association to African Petroleum Producers Organization in 2017.

The founding of APPO was spearheaded by Nigeria as an effort to mitigate the nation's dependency on Western technology and Western markets for oil export revenues. The objective of APPO is to promote cooperation in petrochemical research and technology.

== History ==
The African Petroleum Producers' Organization (APPO), initially founded as the African Petroleum Producers' Association in Lagos, Nigeria, on January 27, 1987, was conceived as a collaborative platform for African oil-producing nations to address economic challenges, particularly those arising from oil price fluctuations. The organization, which began with eight member countries, has since expanded to fifteen, evolving through substantial reforms to better align with the dynamic global energy context, involving a strategic overhaul of its mission and the establishment of mechanisms like the Africa Energy Investment Corporation to facilitate investment in the continent's oil and gas sectors amidst a global shift towards renewable energy sources.

== Mission and vision ==
APPO's mission is to promote cooperation in the field of hydrocarbons of its Member Countries and other global institutions to foster fruitful collaboration and partnerships while utilizing petroleum as a catalyst for energy security, sustainable development and economic diversification in Africa.

APPO aspires to be the World's reference and lead institution on Africa's hydro-carbon matters.

== Membership ==
The following African states are members of the African Petroleum Producers Organization:

	State	Year of Entry
(Algeria)	Algeria	1987
(Angola)	Angola	1987
(Benin)	Benin	1987
(Cameroon)	Cameroon	1987
(Chad)	Chad	2005
(Republic of the Congo)	Congo, Republic of the	1987
(Democratic Republic of the Congo)	Congo, Democratic Republic of the	1989
(Ivory Coast)	Côte d'Ivoire	1989
(Egypt)	Egypt	1989
(Equatorial Guinea)	Equatorial Guinea	1996
(Gabon)	Gabon	1987
(Ghana)	Ghana	2011
(Libya)	Libya	1987
(Namibia)	Namibia	2022
(Niger)	Niger	2012
(Nigeria)	Nigeria	1987
(Senegal)	Senegal	2022
(South Africa)	South Africa	2005

=== Observer ===
The following non-African states are observer members of the African Petroleum Producers Organization:

	State	Year of Entry
(Venezuela)	Venezuela	2021

== Criticism ==
A February 2026 article in Climate and Development, described the organization as not participating in outright climate denial, but rather using rehtorical strategy for obstruction that delay the energy transition in Africa.
