= Gregorio Sancianco =

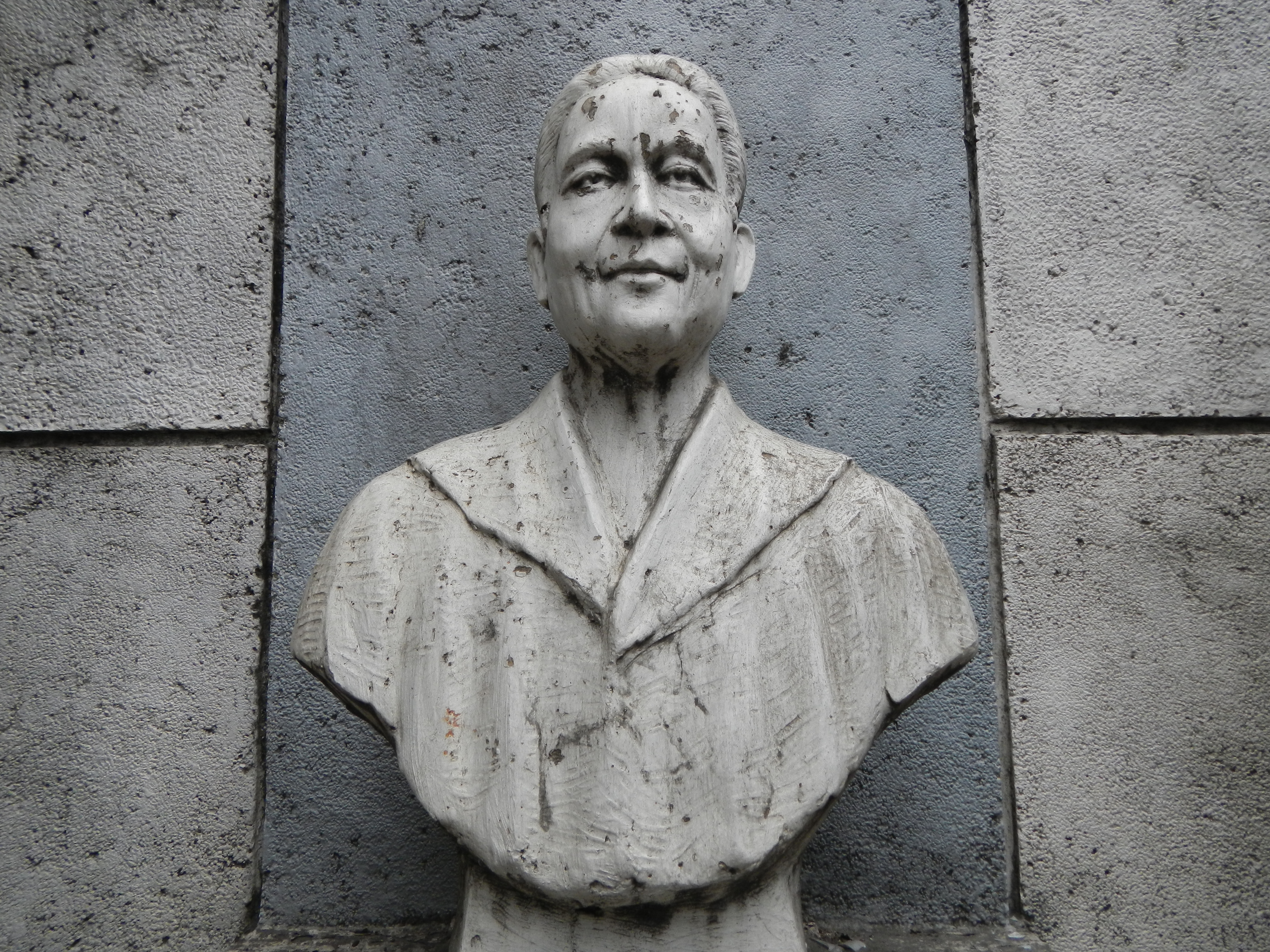
- Bust of Sancianco at the shrine marking his birthplace in Malabon.
- Born: Gregorio Sancianco y Goson; March 7, 1852; Tonsuya, Tambobong, Manila, Captaincy General of the Philippines, Spanish Empire
- Died: November 17, 1897 (aged 45); Santo Domingo, Nueva Ecija, Captaincy General of the Philippines, Spanish Empire
- Citizenship: Filipino
- Education: University of Santo Tomas
- Occupation: Lawyer
- Known for: First Filipino economist

Gregorio Sancianco y Goson (March 7, 1852 – November 17, 1897, surname also spelled as Sanciangco) was a Filipino lawyer and early advocate of economic reforms in the Philippines, which was then under Spanish rule. He was among the first generation of the Propaganda Movement, the lobby for political and economic reforms spearheaded by educated Filipinos (ilustrados) based in Spain in the second half of the 19th century. Sancianco is considered as the "first Filipino economist".

== Early education and political activities ==
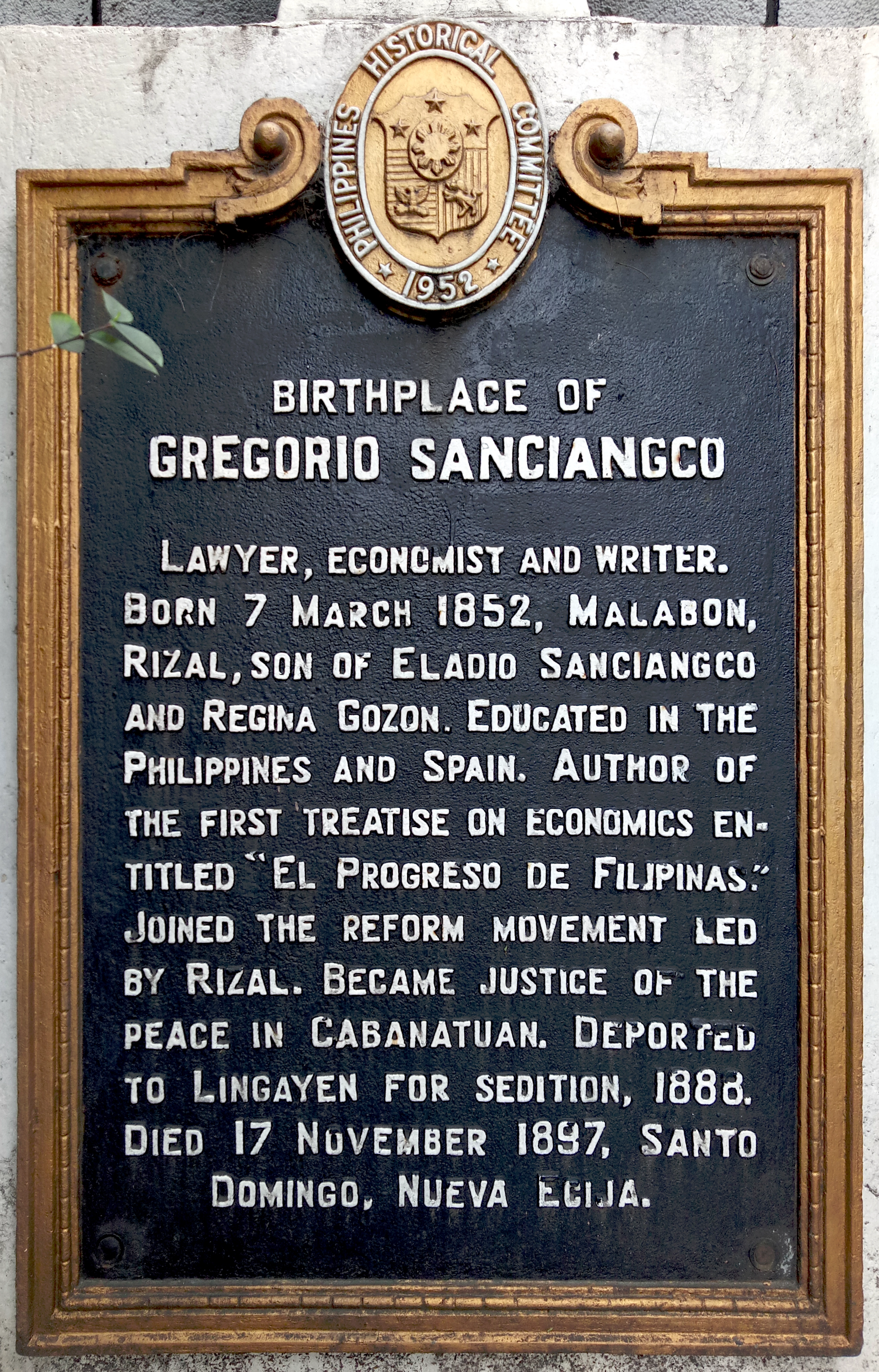
National historical marker installed in 1952 at a small shrine near the vicinity of Sancianco's birthplace

Sancianco was born in Tonsuya, a district of Malabon Tambobong (now Malabon), to Chinese mestizo (half-native, half-Chinese) parents. He studied law at the University of Santo Tomas (UST) and was a founding member of a reformist student organization called Juventud Escolar Liberal. Two other founding members were Paciano Rizal (José Rizal’s elder brother) and Felipe Buencamino. Juventud was part of the broader reform movement in the Philippines and worked under the direction of the Comite de Reformadores, which was led by clergy including Jose Burgos, Mariano Gomez, and Jacinto Zamora, and members of the Manila elite such as the lawyers Joaquin Pardo de Tavera and Ambrosio Rianzares Bautista.

After the terror in the wake of the 1872 Cavite Mutiny, which ultimately led to the unjust execution of the priests Gomez, Burgos, and Zamora, Sancianco left for Spain, where he matriculated at the Universidad Central de Madrid. Sancianco completed his doctorate in civil and canonical law and was the first native of the Philippines ever to earn a doctorate. His dissertation, entitled Restitución in integrum: por qué causas tiene lugar. Juicio crítico de este remedio, was accepted in 1877.

In 1881, while still in Spain, Sancianco published El progreso de Filipinas (The progress of the Philippines). This work, the first treatise on economic issues by a Filipino, analyzed economic conditions in the country. In the process, Sancianco debunked certain racist views, notably those revolving around the alleged “indolence” of the natives. The work’s main purpose however was to propose specific reforms in taxation and revenue-mobilisation for the Philippines as a means of financing physical and social infrastructure. Writing almost a decade later, Jose Rizal explicitly used Sancianco’s Progreso as the starting point for his own work on the related theme of the “Indolence of the Filipinos” (1890).

=== Later life and death ===
Sancianco returned to the Philippines for a short visit in 1882 and returned to the country for good in 1884. He visited San Isidro, Nueva Ecija soon after his return but was falsely implicated in the Novicio Uprising (May 1884) in nearby Pangasinan province and was jailed for months together with his old student-activist colleague Buencamino. Upon his release, he took up the post of justice of the peace in Nueva Ecija, but left after he came into conflict with the parish priest. He subsequently joined the Manila law firm of Rianzares Bautista. He retired to Nueva Ecija and died there on 17 November 1897.

== Work ==
Sancianco’s reputation rests entirely on El Progreso de Filipinas (Madrid 1881). A treatise in public finance, the work is written in the liberal tradition of classical economists such as Adam Smith and Jean-Baptiste Say, as well as the Spanish writer-statesman Gaspar Melchor de Jovellanos, the only economist Sancianco mentions by name.

In Progreso, Sancianco attributes Philippine backwardness to the failure of the Spanish colonial regime to provide even the requirements of the Smithian minimal state, namely: defence and security, the administration of justice, public works, and education. He refutes the racist charge that the “indolence” of the natives is the cause of underdevelopment by pointing instead to the disincentives to production and investment caused by insecurity of persons and property, the absence of peace and order in the countryside, the miserable state of transport and communication, and the burdensome regulations imposed by authorities on the commerce and the movement of goods.

The lack of provision of public goods is attributed in turn to the lack of revenues and the inefficient and racially biased fiscal system. Sancianco called for the abolition of the tobacco monopoly, the racially discriminatory tribute system, and all customs duties. Instead he proposed a reform of the system of internal taxes that involved the introduction of a small poll tax (cedula) applicable to all regardless of race, and a presumptive tax on urban and rural property, as well as on the practice of the professions. Sancianco was aware that a tax based on “net income” was a first-best solution, but his proposals were made taking full account of the pragmatic difficulty of accurately determining and assessing net incomes when taxpayers were prone to evasion and tax officials corruptible. Hence he proposed taxes based on observable characteristics, i.e., presumptive taxes.

His proposal for a presumptive tax on landed property based on area and location but regardless of actual use was particularly novel. It not only explicitly addressed the problem of tax evasion and misstatement of income but was also meant as an implicit investment incentive. Lands that were more productively cultivated and that received greater investment would be pay proportionately less tax under the scheme. Conversely, presumptive taxation would implicitly penalise idle lands and those held for speculation, stimulating their transfer and sale to more active and conscientious producers. Sancianco opposed taxation based on the type of crops cultivated, citing as a reason the unpredictability of market conditions and hence the need to allow entrepreneurs as much flexibility as possible.

Apart from his significance as an early proponent of economic reforms for the Philippines, Sancianco deserves a place in the history of economic thought as an early advocate of presumptive taxation.

The Progreso was supposed to be merely the first part (hence the subtitle parte economico) of a two-part work. A second part (parte administrativo) that would have presumably dealt with expenditure was promised but never appeared.
