= Investment incentive =

Investment incentive is a government-implemented incentive policy aimed to encourage investors into its domestic market or to promote expansion of existing businesses. Investment incentives encompass creating an environment that enables foreign businesses to operate profitably and decreases risks. They are widely used by developing countries to attract investments. The incentives take form of "direct subsidies (investment grants) or corporate income tax credits (investment credit) that compensates the investors for their capital costs".

Scholars generally consider investment incentives to be inefficient, economically costly, and distortionary.

In South Korea and Taiwan, over one-half of all foreign subsidiaries benefit from some form of investment incentive, which is more than most other developed countries (Japan 9%, Switzerland 12%, Canada and France 18%, Germany 20%, Belgium 26%, Italy 29%, UK 32%, Australia 37%).

== See also ==
- Foreign direct investment
- List of countries by FDI abroad
- List of countries by received FDI
- Investment promotion agency
