= Sobre la indolencia de los filipinos =

1890 socio-political essay by José Rizal

Sobre la indolencia de los filipinos ("On the Indolence of the Filipinos" in Spanish) is a socio-political essay published in La solidaridad in Madrid in 1890. It was written by José Rizal as a response to the accusation of Indio or Malay indolence. He admits the existence of indolence among the Filipinos, but it could be attributed to a number of reasons. He traces its causes to factors such as the climate and social disorders. He defends the Filipinos by saying that they are by nature not indolent, because in fact, even before the arrival of Spaniards, Filipinos have been engaged in economic activities such as agriculture and trade. Indolence therefore has more deeply rooted causes such as abuse and discrimination.

A similar work was written by Syed Hussein Alatas, entitled The Myth of the Lazy Native.

== Summary ==
=== Chapter 1 ===
Rizal acknowledges the prior work of Gregorio Sancianco and admits that indolence does exist among the Filipinos, but it cannot be attributed to the troubles and backwardness of the country; rather it is the effect of the backwardness and troubles experienced by the country. Past writings on indolence revolve only on either denying or affirming, and never studying its causes in depth. One must study the causes of indolence, Rizal says, before curing it. He, therefore, enumerates the causes of indolence and elaborates on the circumstances that have led to it. The hot climate, he points out, is a reasonable predisposition for indolence. Filipinos cannot be compared to Europeans, who live in cold countries and who must exert much more effort at work. An hour's work under the Philippine sun, he says, is equivalent to a day's work in temperate regions.

=== Chapter 2 ===
Rizal says that an illness will worsen if the wrong treatment is given. The same applies to indolence. People, however, should not lose hope in fighting indolence. Even before the Spaniards arrived, Rizal argues, the early Filipinos were already carrying out trade within provinces and with other neighboring countries; they were also engaged in agriculture and mining; some natives even spoke Spanish. All this disproves the notion that Filipinos are by nature indolent. Rizal ends by asking what then would have caused Filipinos to forget their past.

=== Chapter 3 ===
Rizal enumerates several reasons that may have caused the Filipinos' cultural and economic decadence. The frequent wars, insurrections, and invasions have brought disorder to the communities. Chaos has been widespread, and destruction rampant. Many Filipinos have also been sent abroad to fight wars for Spain or for expeditions. Thus, the population has decreased in number. Due to forced labor, many men have been sent to shipyards to construct vessels. Meanwhile, natives who have had enough of abuse have gone to the mountains. As a result, the farms have been neglected. The so-called indolence of Filipinos definitely has deeply rooted causes.

=== Chapter 4 ===
According to Rizal, Filipinos are not responsible for their misfortunes, as they are not their own masters. The Spanish government has not encouraged labor and trade, which ceased after the government treated the country's neighboring trade partners with great suspicion. Trade has declined, furthermore, because of pirate attacks and the many restrictions imposed by the government, which gives no aid for crops and farmers. This and the abuse suffered under encomienderos have caused many to abandon the fields. Businesses are monopolized by many government officials, red tape and bribery operate on a wide scale, rampant gambling is tolerated by the government. This situation is compounded by the Church's wrong doctrine which holds that the rich will not go to heaven, thus engendering a wrong attitude toward work. There has also been discrimination in education against natives. These are some of the main reasons that Rizal cites as causing the deterioration of values among the Filipinos.

=== Chapter 5 ===
According to Rizal, all the causes of indolence can be reduced to two factors. The first factor is the limited training and education Filipino natives receive. Segregated from Spaniards, Filipinos do not receive the same opportunities that are available to the foreigners. They are taught to be inferior. The second factor is the lack of a national sentiment of unity among them. Because Filipinos think they are inferior, they submit to the foreign culture and do everything to imitate it. The solution, according to Rizal, would be education and liberty.

== See also ==
- Syed Hussein Alatas
