= List of countries by foreign direct investment inflows =

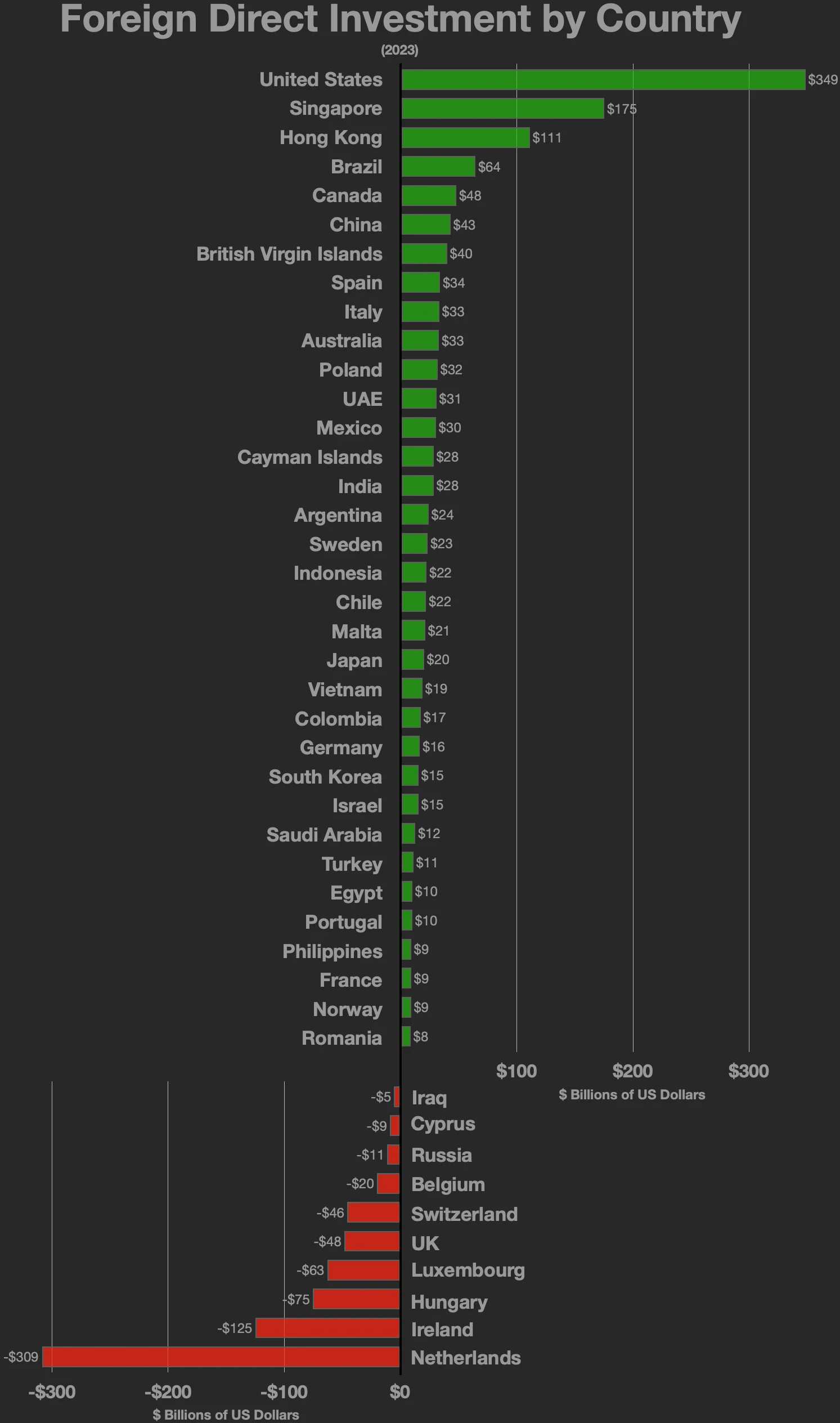
Foreign direct investment by country

This is the list of countries by flows of received foreign direct investment (FDI). The list includes sovereign states and self-governing dependent territories based upon the ISO standard ISO 3166-1.

According to World Bank, "Foreign Direct Investment (FDI) refers to direct investment equity flows in an economy. It is the sum of equity capital, reinvestment of earnings, and other capital. Direct investment is a category of cross-border investment associated with a resident in one economy having control or a significant degree of influence on the management of an enterprise that is resident in another economy. Ownership of 10 percent or more of the ordinary shares of voting stock is the criterion for determining the existence of a direct investment relationship. In the following table, WB figures shows net inflows of investment to the reporting economy from the rest of the world. Data are in current U.S. dollars."

According to Organisation for Economic Co-operation and Development, "inward Foreign Direct Investment (FDI) flows record the value of cross-border direct investment transactions received by the reporting economy during a year. Inward flows represent transactions that increase the investment that foreign investors from the source country have in enterprises resident in the reporting economy, less transactions that decrease the investment of foreign investors in resident enterprises. Net Inward FDI = Investments by foreign parents in resident affiliates plus investments (mostly loans) by foreign fellow enterprises in resident fellows, where those fellows are ultimately controlled by a non-resident parent, minus reverse investments: investments (mostly loans) by resident affiliates in their foreign parents and by resident fellow enterprises in foreign fellows, where those fellows are ultimately controlled by a non-resident parent."

== World Investment Report, Inflows ==
According to the World Investment Report 2026, based on 2025 data, the following list ranks countries based on their total FDI Inflows in billions of dollars:

Rank	Country	2020-2025	2025	2024	2023	2022	2021	2020
1	United States	1,620.201	277.3	283.968	263.242	316.31	386.008	93.373
2	China	903.581	104.659	116.238	163.253	189.132	180.957	149.342
3	Hong Kong	761.926	116.475	137.923	122.947	109.685	140.186	134.71
4	Singapore	747.453	150.898	136.199	126.574	136.464	126.199	71.119
5	Brazil	357.01	76.877	62.565	64.348	74.247	50.651	28.322
6	Germany	343.791	74.272	20.876	68.996	42.09	73.166	64.391
7	Canada	315.542	66.975	66.876	48.305	46.342	61.45	25.594
8	United Kingdom	286.533	75.206	16.403	52.188	45.543	52.796	44.397
9	India	252.275	38.891	27.086	28.083	49.38	44.763	64.072
10	France	231.866	21.908	41.527	42.146	82.263	32.663	11.359
11	Australia	228.458	35.253	51.427	33.904	64.487	26.967	16.42
12	British Virgin Islands	221.135	42.906	32.858	22.951	45.87	50.201	26.349
13	Mexico	213.763	40.871	37.935	36.476	36.419	33.847	28.215
14	Spain	204.348	19.927	34.276	35.167	56.339	43.722	14.917
15	Cayman Islands	192.541	35.783	38.339	17.463	26.779	44.085	30.092
16	United Arab Emirates	187.856	48.243	45.637	30.688	22.737	20.667	19.884
17	Sweden	174.799	30.316	21.781	25.012	52.525	24.657	20.508
18	Poland	139.956	13.915	14.185	29.907	35.509	30.661	15.779
19	Saudi Arabia	133.45	32.628	21.338	22.803	26.71	28.35	1.621
20	Indonesia	132.863	21.435	24.819	21.497	25.39	21.131	18.591
21	Japan	128.933	14.321	13.357	20.841	34.352	34.294	11.768
22	Israel	119.972	26.222	14.778	16.17	22.883	18.95	20.969
23	Vietnam	108.38	20.35	20.17	18.5	17.9	15.66	15.8
24	South Korea	103.579	15.804	12.863	19.042	25.045	22.06	8.765
25	Egypt	94.246	15.453	46.578	9.841	11.4	5.122	5.852
26	Chile	84.844	13.152	11.843	18.416	17.514	12.627	11.292
27	Colombia	75.238	11.426	14.068	16.929	16.363	9.424	7.028
28	Italy	70.458	8.881	20.116	32.635	31.364	-1.591	-20.947
29	Russia	70.293	25.278	2.173	8.998	-15.205	38.639	10.41
30	Turkiye	67.325	12.478	10.988	10.511	14.364	11.477	7.507
31	Malaysia	66.529	15.39	10.202	8.468	17.136	12.173	3.16
32	Portugal	66.364	10.092	14.131	11.66	12.204	10.463	7.814
33	Thailand	66.338	19.098	14.652	11.865	11.705	14.648	-5.63
34	South Africa	56.518	-2.315	2.373	3.903	9.28	40.215	3.062
35	Czechia	56.162	9.769	9.267	9.416	9.248	9.051	9.411
36	Oman	55.844	13.306	12.466	12.546	6.871	8.746	1.909
37	Taiwan	51.373	10.961	11.092	6.491	11.36	5.416	6.0530
38	Denmark	48.857	0.9	12.997	18.135	4.394	8.552	3.879
39	Romania	47.755	9.207	6.065	7.296	11.149	10.606	3.432
40	Philippines	44.281	9.003	9.408	6.452	5.939	10.225	3.254
41	Greece	43.608	12.86	7.593	5.163	8.451	6.328	3.213
42	Argentina	42.895	3.918	8.854	11.285	8.149	6.229	4.46
43	Austria	41.31	-7.562	14.699	8.537	17.019	18.296	-9.679
44	Peru	38.785	11.794	5.903	3.714	11.805	6.324	-0.755
45	Hungary	38.662	3.946	4.02	5.72	9.536	8.662	6.778
46	Norway	37.236	-3.031	4.392	27.367	11.022	3.106	-5.62
47	Guyana	35.779	8.968	8.63	7.246	4.393	4.468	2.074
48	Finland	31.101	1.841	4.577	6.465	6.507	13.29	-1.579
49	Serbia	27.154	3.924	5.657	4.916	4.598	4.59	3.469
50	New Zealand	26.965	2.543	1.393	4.055	9.774	4.689	4.511
51	Malta	26.442	14.36	3.997	1.84	2.415	1.922	1.908
52	Costa Rica	24.487	5.122	5.114	4.4	4.857	3.231	1.763
53	Cambodia	24.14	5.099	4.395	3.959	3.579	3.483	3.625
54	Dominican Republic	23.802	5.033	4.523	4.39	4.099	3.197	2.56
55	Mozambique	22.35	5.693	3.553	2.509	2.458	5.102	3.035
56	Ethiopia	21.36	3.796	3.984	3.269	3.67	4.26	2.381
57	Croatia	19.823	3.077	4.214	3.335	3.903	5.093	0.201
58	Bulgaria	18.6	3.584	2.593	4.466	3.959	1.357	2.641
59	Ukraine	18.142	2.602	3.509	4.399	0.348	7.32	-0.036
60	Lithuania	17.122	3.922	3.744	2.534	3.775	2.659	0.488
61	Kazakhstan	16.522	-0.861	0.227	3.591	6.542	3.353	3.67
62	Uzbekistan	16.03	4.398	2.975	2.156	2.498	2.275	1.728
63	Bahrain	15.667	0.821	2.869	7.226	1.951	1.779	1.021
64	Senegal	15.509	0.037	3.319	4.79	2.929	2.588	1.846
65	Uganda	15.26	3.358	3.116	2.994	2.953	1.648	1.191
66	Mongolia	14.171	2.745	2.782	2.248	2.504	2.173	1.719
67	Nigeria	14.085	4.005	1.614	1.873	0.895	3.313	2.385
68	Belgium	12.959	-26.793	-13.874	27.509	14.528	1.671	9.918
69	Democratic Republic of Congo	12.921	1.869	3.113	2.576	1.846	1.87	1.647
70	Pakistan	12.231	1.852	2.665	2.048	1.462	2.147	2.057
71	Morocco	12.086	3.338	1.748	1.055	2.26	2.266	1.419
72	Kenya	11.772	3.2	2.324	1.735	1.597	1.406	1.51
73	Guinea	11.512	7.763	1.402	1.315	0.658	0.198	0.176
74	Guatemala	11.061	1.882	1.729	1.611	1.442	3.462	0.935
75	Ghana	10.831	1.908	1.766	1.319	1.428	2.534	1.876
76	Panama	10.798	0.905	2.454	2.071	2.114	1.853	1.401
77	Estonia	9.895	0.043	0.852	4.465	0.849	0.081	3.605
78	Ivory Coast	9.692	2.026	1.477	2.485	1.599	1.392	0.713
79	Belarus	9.487	1.551	1.721	1.982	1.597	1.238	1.398
80	Georgia	9.271	1.689	1.569	1.928	2.224	1.265	0.596
81	Bangladesh	8.957	1.78	1.231	1.336	1.636	1.617	1.357
82	Albania	8.956	1.847	1.711	1.622	1.434	1.234	1.108
83	Macao	8.901	3.351	1.712	1.102	3.85	5.191	-6.305
84	Myanmar	8.895	1.067	1.095	1.52	1.239	2.067	1.907
85	Iran	8.785	1.647	1.449	1.422	1.5	1.425	1.342
86	Slovenia	8.734	1.63	1.315	1.543	2.18	1.846	0.22
87	Latvia	8.631	0.262	1.414	1.28	1.47	3.327	0.878
88	Tanzania	8.596	1.718	1.656	1.649	1.438	1.191	0.944
89	Slovakia	8.458	0.733	3.31	1.538	3.46	1.821	-2.404
90	Uruguay	8.409	0.687	-1.906	2.434	3.386	2.977	0.831
91	Jordan	7.989	2.022	1.616	2.006	0.963	0.622	0.76
92	Bahamas	7.871	1.536	1.463	1.535	1.255	1.185	0.897
93	Lebanon	7.793	2.042	1.764	1.219	0.561	0.6	1.607
94	Namibia	7.529	1.447	2.002	2.303	1.072	0.851	-0.146
95	Laos	7.255	1.405	1.303	1.781	0.726	1.072	0.968
96	Nicaragua	7.084	1.503	1.397	1.103	1.287	1.047	0.747
97	Mauritania	6.33	0.634	1.441	0.85	1.41	1.064	0.931
98	Algeria	6.292	1.53	1.295	1.202	0.255	0.87	1.14
99	Iceland	5.02	0.232	2.455	1.696	1.11	0.455	-0.928
100	Honduras	4.917	0.881	0.901	1.057	0.92	0.739	0.419
101	Cameroon	4.888	0.599	0.925	0.799	0.926	0.964	0.675
102	Ecuador	4.878	1.299	0.446	0.481	0.882	0.651	1.119
103	Bosnia and Herzegovina	4.867	0.663	0.975	1.141	0.892	0.716	0.48
104	Zambia	4.867	1.293	2.359	0.641	-0.065	0.394	0.245
105	Tunisia	4.839	1.173	0.867	0.771	0.714	0.66	0.654
106	Kuwait	4.789	0.497	0.614	2.113	0.758	0.567	0.24
107	Paraguay	4.545	1.18	0.931	0.807	0.951	0.39	0.286
108	Turkmenistan	4.489	0.701	0.684	0.623	0.556	0.489	1.436
109	Sri Lanka	4.426	1.044	0.759	0.713	0.884	0.592	0.434
110	Mali	4.361	0.844	0.921	0.703	0.716	0.64	0.537
111	Maldives	4.246	0.857	0.806	0.767	0.732	0.643	0.441
112	Somalia	4.047	0.834	0.765	0.677	0.636	0.601	0.534
113	North Macedonia	4.019	0.528	1.295	0.625	0.785	0.556	0.23
114	Montenegro	3.908	0.675	0.599	0.526	0.877	0.699	0.532
115	Suriname	3.7333	2.039	0.675	0.506	0.308	0.205	0.0003
116	Rwanda	3.711	0.967	0.873	0.716	0.496	0.399	0.26
117	Niger	3.563	0.257	0.358	1.026	0.966	0.595	0.361
118	Mauritius	3.314	0.804	0.681	0.797	0.546	0.261	0.225
119	Zimbabwe	3.036	0.965	0.597	0.635	0.395	0.25	0.194
120	New Caledonia	2.919	0.44	0.505	0.377	0.231	0.794	0.572
121	Armenia	2.718	0.605	0.132	0.58	0.976	0.366	0.059
122	El Salvador	2.662	0.475	0.756	0.849	0.172	0.386	0.024
123	Moldova	2.432	0.46	0.462	0.365	0.591	0.404	0.15
124	Libya	2.422	0.828	0.697	0.798	0.702	-0.603	
125	Sudan	2.362			0.548	0.574	0.523	0.717
126	Equatorial Guinea	2.241	0.294	0.188	-0.182	1.388	0.562	-0.009
127	Benin	2.217	0.482	0.396	0.443	0.376	0.346	0.174
128	Jamaica	2.053	0.351	0.305	0.492	0.319	0.321	0.265
129	Gabon	1.943	0.379	0.31	-0.283	1	0.437	0.1
130	Madagascar	1.803	0.304	0.231	0.084	0.468	0.358	0.358
131	Malawi	1.576	0.452	0.33	0.214	0.199	0.129	0.252
132	Antigua and Barbuda	1.559	0.307	0.275	0.308	0.332	0.292	0.045
133	Palestine	1.555	0.443	0.147	0.299	0.233	0.353	0.08
134	Barbados	1.502	0.273	0.303	0.225	0.2	0.239	0.262
135	Seychelles	1.382	0.34	0.177	0.225	0.212	0.225	0.203
136	Gambia	1.378	0.267	0.232	0.206	0.231	0.252	0.19
137	Fiji	1.31	0.263	0.204	0.091	0.104	0.407	0.241
138	Liberia	1.301	0.5	0.472	0.312	0.124	-0.013	-0.094
139	Grenada	1.22	0.207	0.199	0.263	0.202	0.189	0.16
140	Burkina Faso	1.105	0.312	-0.202	0.507	0.67	-0.08	-0.102
141	Saint Lucia	1.017	0.251	0.256	0.246	0.099	0.068	0.097
142	Curacao	0.959	0.183	0.155	0.155	0.164	0.146	0.156
143	Kyrgyzstan	0.935	0.642	0.255	0.159	0.055	0.226	-0.402
144	Venezuela	0.908	-0.367	-2.328	0.188	2.35	1.213	-0.148
145	Tajikistan	0.883	0.086	0.291	0.141	0.174	0.084	0.107
146	Djibouti	0.871	0.149	0.068	0.137	0.191	0.168	0.158
147	Sierra Leone	0.855	0.177	0.122	0.146	0.145	0.214	0.051
148	Bolivia	0.679	0.62	0.358	0.24	0.006	0.584	-1.129
149	Belize	0.655	0.04	0.167	0.095	0.13	0.139	0.084
150	Brunei	0.633	0.168	0.026	-0.051	-0.292	0.205	0.557
151	Saint Vincent and the Grenadines	0.602	0.117	0.121	0.063	0.07	0.174	0.057
152	Cape Verde	0.581	0.153	0.064	0.129	0.107	0.077	0.051
153	Nepal	0.562	0.044	0.057	0.074	0.065	0.196	0.126
154	Botswana	0.543	-0.654	0.578	0.198	0.708	-0.319	0.032
155	Aruba	0.537	0.071	0.103	-0.178	0.261	0.143	0.137
156	Bermuda	0.513	0.118	0.118	0.153	0.01	0.002	0.112
157	Eritrea	0.439	0.082	0.013	0.134	0.144	0.001	0.065
158	Eswatini	0.376	0.045	0.134	0.029	0.015	0.117	0.036
159	Cuba	0.362	0.079	-0.008	-0.01	0.134	0.165	0.002
160	South Sudan	0.358	0.073	0.083	-0.006	0.122	0.068	0.018
161	Palau	0.342	0.057	0.055	0.08	0.074	0.032	0.044
162	Anguilla	0.309	0.023	0.059	0.045	0.033	0.08	0.069
163	Burundi	0.298	0.068	0.062	0.061	0.054	0.012	0.041
164	Sao Tome and Principe	0.235	0.01	0.022	0.024	0.127	0.019	0.033
165	Solomon Islands	0.206	0.067	0.033	0.025	0.044	0.028	0.009
166	Dominica	0.19	0.046	0.057	0.044	0.01	0.028	0.005
167	Vanuatu	0.184	0.033	0.051	0.016	0.019	0.036	0.029
168	Sint Maarten	0.182	0.035	0.05	0.041	0.007	0.027	0.022
169	Saint Kitts and Nevis	0.1785	0.0292	0.0723	0.0307	0.031	0.0158	-0.0005
170	Haiti	0.171	0.012	0.02	0.024	0.039	0.051	0.025
171	Guinea-Bissau	0.154	0.034	0.027	0.02	0.033	0.019	0.021
172	Togo	0.135	0.221	0.202	0.08	-0.173	-0.136	-0.059
173	Central African Republic	0.096	0.044	0.04	-0.027	0.017	0.03	-0.008
174	Timor-Leste	0.065	0.253	0.225	0.122	0.054	-0.239	-0.35
175	Bhutan	0.0389	0.009	0.009	0.003	0.016	0.0013	0.0006
176	Afghanistan	0.034					0.021	0.013
177	Comoros	0.033	0.009	0.007	0.005	0.004	0.004	0.004
178	Samoa	0.026	0.002	0.004	0.002	0.005	0.009	0.004
179	Kiribati	0.02516	0.00416	0.008	0.005	0.004	0.001	0.003
180	Marshall Islands	0.0185	0.003	0.004	0.003	0.005	0.0005	0.003
181	Cook Islands	0.018	0.003	0.002	0.006	0.004	-0.002	0.005
182	Montserrat	0.0167	0.0014	0.0013	0.004	0.005	0.002	0.003
183	Tuvalu	0.0012	0.0002	0.0003	0.0002	0.0002	0.0002	0.0001
184	North Korea	-0.0087	0.009	-0.014	0.0009	-0.0005	-0.0001	-0.004
185	Tonga	-0.0217	-0.02	-0.012	0.003	0.003	0.0003	0.004
186	Lesotho	-0.037	-0.006	-0.013	-0.026	-0.008	-0.012	0.028
187	French Polynesia	-0.06	0.011	-0.014	-0.006	-0.009	-0.026	-0.016
188	Yemen	-0.155	-0.005	-0.003	-0.012	-0.051	-0.064	-0.02
189	Papua New Guinea	-0.197	-1.181	-0.335	0.048	1.193	-0.034	0.112
190	Qatar	-0.432	3.033	0.46	-0.474	0.076	-1.093	-2.434
191	Chad	-0.989	0.004	0.003	0.442	-1.603	-0.011	0.176
192	Republic of Congo	-1.306	0.596	0.604	0.834	-1.037	-0.32	-1.983
193	Trinidad and Tobago	-1.814	-1.156	-0.453	-1.498	1.172	-0.935	1.056
194	Azerbaijan	-4.817	0.374	0.231	0.253	-4.474	-1.708	0.507
195	Angola	-15.449	1.149	-1.658	-2.12	-6.599	-4.355	-1.866
196	Iraq	-28.215	-7.618	-7.649	-5.364	-2.088	-2.637	-2.859
197	Cyprus	-69.245	4.983	0.496	-7.039	3.419	12.18	-83.284
198	Ireland	-89.369	14.41	-37.131	-108.76	-55.848	-11.597	109.557
199	Switzerland	-254.478	9.502	-68.897	-42.343	-37.654	-71.592	-43.494
200	Luxembourg	-306.603	-33.058	24.972	-8.573	-303.86	16.198	-2.282
201	Netherlands	-503.656	-33.173	8.945	-237.467	-76.798	-33.572	-131.591

== World Investment Report, Outflows ==
According to the World Investment Report 2026, based on 2025 data, the following list ranks countries based on their total FDI Outflows in billions of dollars:

Rank	Country	2025	2024
1	United States	263	252
2	Japan	186	204
3	China	174	192
4	Luxembourg	101	75
5	Hong Kong	95	93
6	Singapore	94	55
7	Germany	87	46
8	United Kingdom	85	43
9	United Arab Emirates	63	77
10	Netherlands	58	39
11	France	57	43
12	Canada	55	93
13	Ireland	53	30
14	Taiwan	45	33
15	South Korea	41	50
16	Switzerland	37	4
17	Kuwait	36	10
18	India	36	24
19	Denmark	36	26
20	Spain	31	62

== Foreign Direct Investment, net inflows ==
Sorting is alphabetical by country code, according to ISO 3166-1 alpha-3.

Country/Territory/Region/Group	WB				OECD	
Country/Territory/Region/Group	Foreign direct investment, net inflows				Inward FDI flows	
Country/Territory/Region/Group	mil US$	Year	% of GDP	Year	mil USD	Year
(United Nations) WORLD	847824.70	2023	0.75%	2023	1175019.41	2023
Aruba	−177.94	2023	7.00%	2022		
Afghanistan	20.60	2021	0.14%	2021		
Angola	−2119.63	2023	−2.50%	2023		
Albania	1614.45	2023	7.03%	2023		
United Arab Emirates	30687.54	2023	6.09%	2023		
Argentina	23866.14	2023	3.73%	2023		
Armenia	580.37	2023	2.40%	2023		
Antigua and Barbuda	300.60	2023	14.79%	2023		
Australia	32744.70	2023	1.90%	2023	32992.49	2023
Austria	−667.97	2023	−0.13%	2023	4503.68	2023
Azerbaijan	252.84	2023	0.35%	2023		
Burundi	34.13	2023	1.29%	2023		
Belgium	−20003.31	2023	−3.16%	2023	23020.11	2023
Benin	433.85	2023	2.21%	2023		
Burkina Faso	85.35	2023	0.42%	2023		
Bangladesh	1385.16	2023	0.32%	2023		
Bulgaria	4405.52	2023	4.34%	2023		
Bahrain	6839.63	2023	15.83%	2023		
Bahamas	1459.00	2023	10.18%	2023		
Bosnia and Herzegovina	944.79	2023	3.49%	2023		
Belarus	2070.00	2023	2.88%	2023		
Belize	16.27	2023	0.50%	2023		
Bermuda	156.44	2023	0.13%	2022		
Bolivia	293.69	2023	0.64%	2023		
Brazil	64227.33	2023	2.95%	2023		
Barbados	224.90	2023	3.52%	2023		
Brunei	−50.99	2023	−0.34%	2023		
Bhutan	11.92	2023	0.29%	2022		
Botswana	665.42	2023	3.43%	2023		
Central African Republic	38.74	2023	1.52%	2023		
Canada	47745.20	2023	2.23%	2023	46179.60	2023
Switzerland	−45590.02	2023	−5.15%	2023	8268.88	2023
Chile	21737.84	2023	6.48%	2023	21026.94	2023
China	42727.68	2023	0.24%	2023		
Ivory Coast	1752.56	2023	2.22%	2023		
Cameroon	799.20	2023	1.67%	2023		
Democratic Republic of the Congo	1667.90	2023	2.51%	2023		
Republic of the Congo	626.47	2023	4.09%	2023		
Colombia	17146.85	2023	4.72%	2023	17146.85	2023
Comoros	5.00	2023	0.37%	2023		
Cape Verde	159.01	2023	6.15%	2023		
Costa Rica	4687.48	2023	5.42%	2023	3988.80	2023
Curaçao	136.60	2023	5.71%	2022		
Cayman Islands	28134.16	2023	−44.23%	2022		
Cyprus	−8942.34	2023	−27.75%	2023		
Czech Republic	8225.35	2023	2.49%	2023	7785.91	2023
Germany	16289.40	2023	0.37%	2023	36699.28	2023
Djibouti	137.01	2023	3.34%	2023		
Dominica	20.69	2023	3.16%	2023		
Denmark	6754.26	2023	1.67%	2023	9700.26	2023
Dominican Republic	4750.50	2023	3.91%	2023		
Algeria	1215.78	2023	0.51%	2023		
Ecuador	380.34	2023	0.32%	2023		
Egypt	9840.60	2023	2.49%	2023		
Eritrea	2.07	2023	1.89%	2011		
Spain	33705.76	2023	2.13%	2023	33469.94	2023
Estonia	5133.82	2023	12.60%	2023	4393.94	2023
Ethiopia	3262.97	2023	1.99%	2023		
Finland	−1467.80	2023	−0.49%	2023	7408.09	2023
Fiji	91.02	2023	1.66%	2023		
France	8803.38	2023	0.29%	2023	42284.98	2023
Federated States of Micronesia	20.21	2014	6.33%	2014		
Gabon	1150.73	2023	5.61%	2023		
United Kingdom	−48148.52	2023	−1.44%	2023	−89926.66	2023
Georgia	1777.74	2023	5.82%	2023		
Ghana	1319.32	2023	1.73%	2023		
Guinea	893.15	2023	3.78%	2023		
Gambia	208.37	2023	8.91%	2023		
Guinea-Bissau	23.80	2023	1.21%	2023		
Equatorial Guinea	141.78	2023	1.17%	2023		
Greece	4988.72	2023	2.09%	2023	5430.37	2023
Grenada	163.82	2023	12.41%	2023		
Guatemala	1545.93	2023	1.51%	2023		
Guyana	7197.90	2023	42.88%	2023		
Hong Kong	111109.24	2023	29.08%	2023		
Honduras	1084.55	2023	3.15%	2023		
Croatia	2938.50	2023	3.55%	2023		
Haiti	32.00	2023	0.16%	2023		
Hungary	−75221.44	2023	−35.42%	2023	6296.03	2023
Indonesia	22085.91	2023	1.61%	2023		
India	28070.21	2023	0.79%	2023		
Ireland	−124835.43	2023	−22.88%	2023	−9345.69	2023
Iran	1422.33	2023	0.35%	2023		
Iraq	−5273.33	2023	−2.10%	2023		
Iceland	597.71	2023	1.93%	2023	390.13	2023
Israel	15110.60	2023	2.96%	2023	15110.60	2023
Italy	33135.36	2023	1.47%	2023	18219.37	2023
Jamaica	376.52	2023	1.94%	2023		
Jordan	842.82	2023	1.66%	2023		
Japan	19983.86	2023	0.47%	2023	21431.07	2023
Kazakhstan	5303.90	2023	2.03%	2023		
Kenya	1504.34	2023	1.40%	2023		
Kyrgyzstan	490.40	2023	3.51%	2023		
Cambodia	3958.79	2023	12.46%	2023		
Kiribati	2.18	2023	0.78%	2023		
Saint Kitts and Nevis	32.16	2023	2.99%	2023		
South Korea	15178.40	2023	0.89%	2023	15178.40	2023
Kuwait	2114.60	2023	1.31%	2023		
Laos	1668.16	2023	10.53%	2023		
Lebanon	655.44	2023	2.51%	2022		
Liberia	744.58	2023	17.19%	2023		
Libya	603.00	2021	1.26%	2021		
Saint Lucia	138.72	2023	5.50%	2023		
Liechtenstein	−87212.09	2018	−1303.11%	2018		
Sri Lanka	711.83	2023	0.84%	2023		
Lesotho	−25.65	2023	−1.25%	2023		
Lithuania	3172.25	2023	4.08%	2023	1907.70	2023
Luxembourg	−62807.62	2023	−73.24%	2023	−62810.34	2023
Latvia	1504.30	2023	3.45%	2023	1200.26	2023
Macau	2323.96	2023	4.94%	2023		
Morocco	1095.98	2023	0.78%	2023		
Moldova	416.99	2023	2.52%	2023		
Madagascar	414.54	2023	2.59%	2023		
Maldives	761.52	2023	11.54%	2023		
Mexico	30195.95	2023	1.69%	2023	36280.96	2023
Marshall Islands	2.04	2023	0.72%	2023		
North Macedonia	702.49	2023	4.76%	2023		
Mali	697.97	2023	3.34%	2023		
Malta	20899.83	2023	99.73%	2023		
Myanmar	1520.17	2023	2.35%	2023		
Montenegro	525.87	2023	7.10%	2023		
Mongolia	2247.57	2023	11.31%	2023		
Mozambique	2683.51	2023	13.01%	2023		
Mauritania	873.44	2023	8.36%	2023		
Mauritius	759.82	2023	5.28%	2023		
Malawi	203.25	2023	1.44%	2023		
Malaysia	7918.60	2023	1.98%	2023		
Namibia	2294.38	2023	18.58%	2023		
New Caledonia	687.25	2023	7.24%	2022		
Niger	966.03	2023	5.74%	2023		
Nigeria	1872.52	2023	0.52%	2023		
Nicaragua	1230.10	2023	6.90%	2023		
Netherlands	−309007.49	2023	−27.64%	2023	−184370.33	2023
Norway	8687.89	2023	1.79%	2023	8830.25	2023
Nepal	73.83	2023	0.18%	2023		
New Zealand	3592.04	2023	1.42%	2023	2985.63	2023
Oman	4745.38	2023	4.39%	2023		
Pakistan	2048.00	2023	0.60%	2023		
Panama	2326.84	2023	2.79%	2023		
Peru	3918.25	2023	1.46%	2023		
Philippines	8863.96	2023	2.03%	2023		
Palau	47.82	2023	18.18%	2023		
Papua New Guinea	−424.80	2023	−1.37%	2023		
Poland	31576.00	2023	3.89%	2023	22866.54	2023
Portugal	9706.32	2023	3.38%	2023	7221.02	2023
Paraguay	240.72	2023	0.56%	2023		
Palestine	103.54	2023	0.60%	2023		
French Polynesia	−6.50	2023	−0.16%	2022		
Qatar	−474.18	2023	0.03%	2022		
Romania	8412.98	2023	2.40%	2023		
Russia	−11132.62	2023	−0.55%	2023		
Rwanda	459.17	2023	3.26%	2023		
Saudi Arabia	12319.04	2023	1.15%	2023		
Sudan	573.50	2022	1.11%	2022		
Senegal	2641.33	2023	8.52%	2023		
Singapore	175241.47	2023	34.95%	2023		
Solomon Islands	78.90	2023	4.84%	2023		
Sierra Leone	262.97	2023	6.90%	2023		
El Salvador	638.12	2023	1.88%	2023		
Somalia	676.50	2023	5.79%	2023		
Serbia	4891.72	2023	6.51%	2023		
South Sudan	−6.34	2023	0.00%	2015		
São Tomé and Príncipe	18.44	2023	3.06%	2023		
Suriname	−53.10	2023	−1.40%	2023		
Slovakia	−327.96	2023	−0.25%	2023	180.27	2023
Slovenia	1141.38	2023	1.67%	2023	1473.90	2023
Sweden	23001.11	2023	3.88%	2023	30367.72	2023
Eswatini	28.13	2023	0.61%	2023		
Sint Maarten	45.27	2023	2.79%	2023		
Seychelles	239.71	2023	11.19%	2023		
Syria	804.16	2011	1.19%	2011		
Turks and Caicos Islands	32.66	2023	2.33%	2023		
Chad	913.33	2023	6.95%	2023		
Togo	33.59	2023	0.37%	2023		
Thailand	3086.43	2023	0.60%	2023		
Tajikistan	140.58	2023	1.17%	2023		
Turkmenistan	1378.31	2023	2.30%	2023		
Timor-Leste	−50.11	2023	−2.23%	2023		
Tonga	24.34	2023	1.50%	2022		
Trinidad and Tobago	−1555.47	2023	−5.53%	2023		
Tunisia	767.99	2023	1.58%	2023		
Turkey	10642.00	2023	0.96%	2023	10418.84	2023
Tuvalu	0.17	2023	0.27%	2023		
Tanzania	1338.82	2023	1.69%	2023		
Uganda	2886.01	2023	5.86%	2023		
Ukraine	4805.00	2023	2.69%	2023		
Uruguay	−436.30	2023	−0.56%	2023		
United States	348784.00	2023	1.27%	2023	288683.00	2023
Uzbekistan	2143.82	2023	2.36%	2023		
Saint Vincent and the Grenadines	81.43	2023	7.64%	2023		
Venezuela	688.00	2023	0.24%	2014		
British Virgin Islands	39889.38	2023				
Vietnam	18500.00	2023	4.31%	2023		
Vanuatu	9.27	2023	0.82%	2023		
Samoa	2.40	2023	0.26%	2023		
Kosovo	913.12	2023	8.75%	2023		
Yemen	−370.98	2019	−1.69%	2019		
South Africa	3442.33	2023	0.91%	2023		
Zambia	91.03	2023	0.32%	2023		
Zimbabwe	588.40	2023	2.22%	2023		
SIDS (Small Island Developing States)						
SIDS: Caribbean	9582.39	2023	17.99%	2023		
SIDS: Pacific	258.13	2023	2.32%	2023		
LDCs (Least developed countries)	29214.49	2023	2.16%	2023		
Low & middle income economies (WB)	388042.63	2023	1.05%	2023		
Low-income economies (WB)	16258.45	2023	3.58%	2023		
Middle-income economies (WB)	371784.18	2023	1.01%	2023		
Lower middle income economies (WB)	97858.11	2023	1.32%	2023		
Upper middle income economies (WB)	273926.07	2023	0.94%	2023		
High-income economies (WB)	459094.07	2023	0.58%	2023		
European Union	−379487.15	2023	−2.07%	2023	11394.09	2023
OECD	75894.32	2023	0.12%	2023	446888.78	2023

== See also ==
- List of countries by FDI abroad
