= ESIC Medical College and Hospital, Patna =

Medical school in Bihar, India

- Type: Medical College and Hospital
- Established: 27 November 2021; 4 years ago
- Affiliations: Bihar University of Health Sciences, NMC
- Dean: Dr. Nandakishore Alva N.
- Location: Bihta, Patna district, Bihar, India; 25.5739°N 84.8566°E
- Campus: Rural
- Website: https://mcpatna.esic.gov.in/

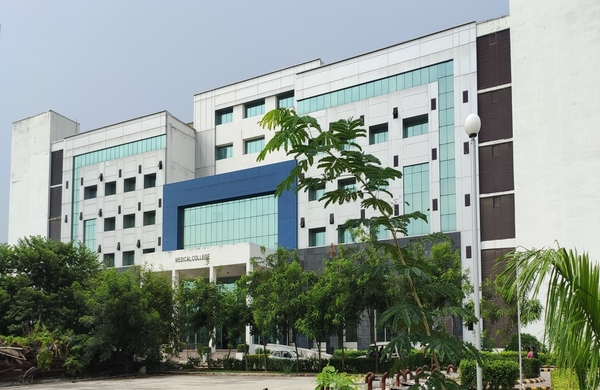
ESIC Medical College, Patna

Employees State Insurance Corporation Medical College, Patna (abbreviated as ESIC Medical College, Patna) is an NMC recognised medical college established in 2021 under the aegis of the ESIC, a centrally controlled autonomous body. This college is located at Bihta.

The college imparts the Bachelor of Medicine and Surgery (MBBS) degree. The hospital associated with the college is one of the largest hospitals in the Patna district. Yearly undergraduate student intake is 100 from the year 2021.

== Courses ==
ESIC Medical College, Patna undertakes education and training of 100 students MBBS courses.

== Affiliated ==
The college is affiliated with Bihar University of Health Sciences and is recognized by the National Medical Commission.
