= List of countries by foreign direct investment outflows =

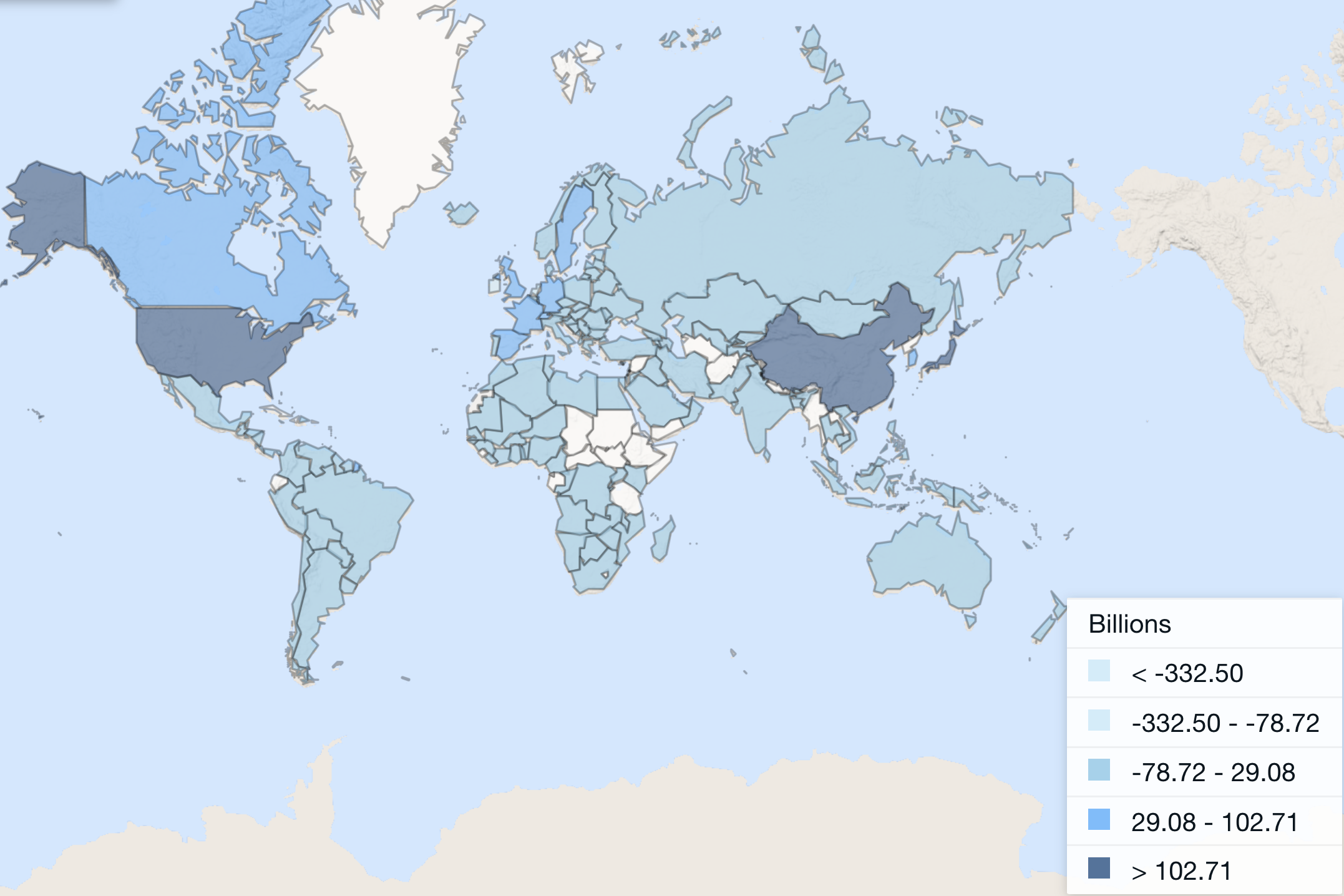
Map of countries by Foreign Direct Investment, net outflows (current US$), 2023, according to World Bank

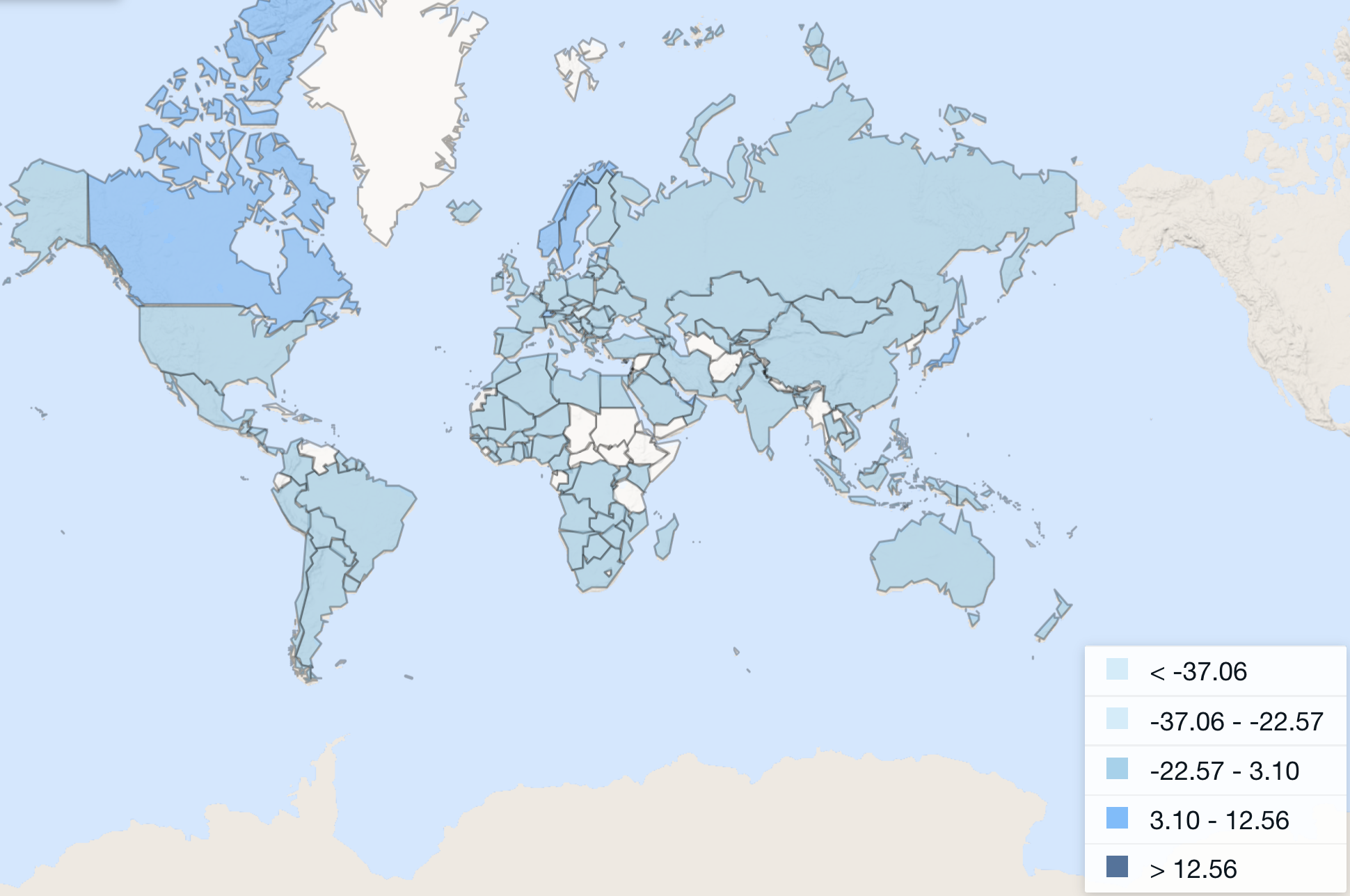
Map of countries by Foreign Direct Investment, net outflows (% of GDP), 2023, according to World Bank

This is the list of countries by flows of foreign direct investment (FDI) abroad. The list includes sovereign states and self-governing dependent territories based upon the ISO standard ISO 3166-1.

According to the World Bank, "Foreign Direct Investment (FDI) refers to direct investment equity flows in an economy. It is the sum of equity capital, reinvestment of earnings, and other capital. Direct investment is a category of cross-border investment associated with a resident in one economy having control or a significant degree of influence on the management of an enterprise that is resident in another economy. Ownership of 10 percent or more of the ordinary shares of voting stock is the criterion for determining the existence of a direct investment relationship. In the following table, WB figures shows net outflows of investment from the reporting economy to the rest of the world. Data are in current U.S. dollars."

According to the Organisation for Economic Co-operation and Development, "outward Foreign Direct Investment (FDI) flows record the value of cross-border direct investment transactions from the reporting economy during a year. Outward flows represent transactions that increase the investment that investors in the reporting economy have in enterprises in the destination country less any transactions that decrease the investment that investors in the reporting economy have in enterprises in the destination country. Net Outward FDI = Investments by resident parents in their affiliates abroad and investments (mostly loans) by resident fellow enterprises in other fellows abroad, where those fellows are ultimately controlled by a resident parent, minus reverse investments: investments (mostly loans) by foreign affiliates in their resident parents and by foreign fellow enterprises in resident fellows, where those fellows are ultimately controlled by a resident parent."

== Foreign direct investment, net outflows ==
Sorting is alphabetical by country code, according to ISO 3166-1 alpha-3.

Country/Territory/Region/Group	WB				OECD	
Country/Territory/Region/Group	Foreign direct investment, net outflows				Outward FDI flows	
Country/Territory/Region/Group	mil US$	Year	% of GDP	Year	mil USD	Year
(United Nations) WORLD	1553607.49	2024	1.47%	2024	1593414.24	2024
Aruba	54.88	2023	1.50%	2023		
Afghanistan	30.79	2021	0.22%	2021		
Angola	33.06	2024	0.04%	2024		
Albania	260.60	2024	0.96%	2024		
United Arab Emirates	22328.11	2023	4.34%	2023		
Argentina	2689.76	2024	0.42%	2024	2757.00	2024
Armenia	63.05	2024	0.24%	2024		
Antigua and Barbuda	17.88	2024	0.80%	2024		
Australia	15670.15	2024	0.89%	2024	14920.82	2024
Austria	10808.35	2024	2.07%	2024	12416.18	2024
Azerbaijan	742.44	2024	1.00%	2024		
Burundi	1.17	2023	0.04%	2023		
Belgium	−6071.75	2024	−0.91%	2024	2933.16	2024
Benin	13.01	2023	0.07%	2023		
Burkina Faso	45.09	2023	0.22%	2023		
Bangladesh	−2.07	2024	0.00%	2024		
Bulgaria	1034.05	2024	0.92%	2024		
Bahrain	275.00	2024	0.58%	2024		
Bahamas	162.94	2024	1.03%	2024		
Bosnia and Herzegovina	78.87	2024	0.28%	2024		
Belarus	147.81	2024	0.19%	2024		
Belize	2.61	2024	0.07%	2024		
Bermuda	36.78	2023	0.43%	2023		
Bolivia	256.54	2023	0.57%	2023		
Brazil	24318.63	2024	1.12%	2024	12426.82	2024
Barbados	8.00	2023	0.12%	2023		
Brunei	17.46	2006	0.14%	2006		
Botswana	9.49	2023	0.05%	2023		
Central African Republic	0.00	2002	0.00%	2002		
Canada	84318.21	2024	3.76%	2024	90137.19	2024
Switzerland	−34741.95	2024	−3.71%	2024	1642.41	2024
Chile	3591.88	2024	1.09%	2024	2430.72	2024
China	172243.72	2024	0.92%	2024	172244.00	2024
Ivory Coast	214.91	2023	0.27%	2023		
Cameroon	−79.51	2023	−0.16%	2023		
Democratic Republic of the Congo	235.50	2023	0.35%	2023		
Republic of the Congo	26.36	2023	0.17%	2023		
Colombia	4611.27	2024	1.10%	2024	4576.26	2024
Comoros	1.10	1990	0.26%	1990		
Cape Verde	20.46	2024	0.74%	2024		
Costa Rica	1002.32	2024	1.05%	2024	−75.56	2024
Curaçao	7.26	2023	0.22%	2023		
Cayman Islands	1263.83	2023	17.70%	2023		
Cyprus	−10684.24	2023	−31.53%	2023		
Czech Republic	11178.59	2024	3.24%	2024	8315.12	2024
Germany	80163.89	2024	1.72%	2024	38495.34	2024
Dominica	0.42	2024	0.06%	2024		
Denmark	31197.58	2024	7.26%	2024	19787.39	2024
Dominican Republic	−47.30	2024	−0.04%	2024		
Algeria	165.58	2023	0.07%	2023		
Egypt	390.40	2023	0.10%	2023		
Eritrea	−27.88	2000	−3.95%	2000		
Spain	52467.06	2024	3.05%	2024	51536.88	2024
Estonia	−3709.26	2024	−8.67%	2024	690.56	2024
Finland	5567.10	2024	1.86%	2024	5632.71	2024
Fiji	28.98	2023	0.53%	2023		
France	46960.82	2024	1.49%	2024	16658.79	2024
Federated States of Micronesia	−0.51	2014	−0.16%	2014		
Gabon	−33.78	2019	−0.20%	2019		
United Kingdom	68306.26	2024	1.87%	2024	25288.11	2024
Georgia	461.81	2024	1.37%	2024		
Ghana	11.01	2023	0.01%	2023		
Guinea	19.84	2023	0.09%	2023		
Gambia	−0.61	2023	−0.03%	2023		
Guinea-Bissau	0.31	2023	0.01%	2023		
Equatorial Guinea	−0.69	2022	−0.01%	2022		
Greece	1793.19	2024	0.70%	2024	2615.83	2024
Grenada	2.72	2024	0.20%	2024		
Guatemala	825.13	2024	0.73%	2024		
Guyana	6.85	2023	0.04%	2023		
Hong Kong	78101.37	2024	19.18%	2024		
Honduras	688.93	2024	1.86%	2024		
Croatia	2787.56	2024	0.23%	2023		
Haiti	−1.00	1999	−0.02%	1999		
Hungary	−48370.79	2024	−21.70%	2024	4867.53	2024
Indonesia	9278.21	2024	0.66%	2024	9822.00	2024
India	23768.83	2024	0.61%	2024	24249.00	2024
Ireland	−127045.09	2023	−23.04%	2023	24913.16	2024
Iran	86.67	2023	0.02%	2023		
Iraq	286.20	2023	0.11%	2023		
Iceland	454.45	2024	1.36%	2024	120.17	2024
Israel	10477.70	2024	1.94%	2024	10477.70	2024
Italy	34074.48	2024	1.44%	2024	37012.67	2024
Jamaica	1.07	2024	0.01%	2024		
Jordan	64.23	2023	0.13%	2023		
Japan	208220.72	2024	5.17%	2024	204280.54	2024
Kazakhstan	−1891.33	2024	−0.66%	2024		
Kenya	500.48	2023	0.46%	2023		
Kyrgyzstan	1.50	2023	0.01%	2023		
Cambodia	171.83	2024	0.37%	2024		
Kiribati	0.02	2023	0.01%	2023		
Saint Kitts and Nevis	2.40	2024	0.22%	2024		
South Korea	48588.80	2024	1.88%	2023	48588.80	2024
Kuwait	10323.28	2024	6.44%	2024		
Laos	0.01	2022	0.00%	2022		
Lebanon	72.67	2023	0.36%	2023		
Liberia	87.37	2023	1.99%	2023		
Libya	−164.18	2023	−0.36%	2023		
Saint Lucia	−8.14	2024	−0.32%	2024		
Sri Lanka	33.93	2023	0.04%	2023		
Lithuania	156.16	2024	0.18%	2024	−172.30	2024
Luxembourg	−23678.69	2023	−27.04%	2023	108019.68	2024
Latvia	222.37	2024	0.51%	2024	126.54	2024
Macau	498.83	2023	1.09%	2023		
Morocco	835.94	2023	0.58%	2023		
Moldova	89.55	2024	0.49%	2024		
Madagascar	119.26	2023	0.75%	2023		
Mexico	12720.72	2024	0.69%	2024	5577.18	2024
Marshall Islands	2.94	2006	2.05%	2006		
North Macedonia	−2.99	2024	−0.02%	2024		
Mali	29.66	2023	0.12%	2023		
Malta	30908.81	2024	127.08%	2024		
Montenegro	67.80	2024	0.84%	2024		
Mongolia	75.94	2023	0.37%	2023		
Mozambique	−44.11	2024	−0.20%	2024		
Mauritania	0.13	2023	0.00%	2023		
Mauritius	16.17	2023	0.11%	2023		
Malawi	69.19	2023	0.54%	2023		
Malaysia	13038.52	2024	3.09%	2024		
Namibia	40.91	2024	0.31%	2024		
New Caledonia	50.60	2023	0.59%	2022		
Niger	9.17	2023	0.05%	2023		
Nigeria	407.95	2024	0.22%	2024		
Nicaragua	73.80	2024	0.37%	2024		
Netherlands	12792.99	2024	1.04%	2024	39170.19	2024
Norway	−2966.71	2024	−0.61%	2024	2980.18	2024
New Zealand	1510.13	2024	0.58%	2024	440.91	2024
Oman	395.06	2023	0.37%	2023		
Pakistan	84.00	2024	0.02%	2024		
Panama	864.53	2024	1.00%	2024		
Peru	1476.08	2023	0.55%	2023		
Philippines	2871.63	2024	0.62%	2024		
Palau	−0.04	1998	−0.03%	1998		
Papua New Guinea	323.30	2023	1.05%	2023		
Poland	7764.00	2024	0.85%	2024	2520.54	2024
Portugal	6710.42	2024	2.17%	2024	7815.34	2024
Paraguay	64.81	2024	0.15%	2024		
Palestine	10.69	2024	0.08%	2024		
French Polynesia	14.97	2023	0.23%	2023		
Qatar	1562.91	2024	0.72%	2024		
Romania	1145.80	2024	0.30%	2024		
Russia	168.77	2024	0.01%	2024	11510.00	2024
Rwanda	0.00	2023	0.00%	2023		
Saudi Arabia	22045.70	2024	1.78%	2024	22045.70	2024
Sudan	54.24	2021	0.16%	2021		
Senegal	70.74	2023	0.23%	2023		
Singapore	55257.42	2024	10.09%	2024		
Solomon Islands	52.88	2024	3.00%	2024		
Sierra Leone	−0.03	2010	0.00%	2010		
El Salvador	287.81	2024	0.81%	2024		
Serbia	327.66	2023	0.40%	2023		
South Sudan	41.98	2017	−0.01%	2015		
São Tomé and Príncipe	−3.65	2023	−0.54%	2023		
Suriname	−11.05	2024	−0.23%	2024		
Slovakia	2308.60	2024	1.63%	2024	575.15	2024
Slovenia	1400.32	2024	1.93%	2024	915.96	2024
Sweden	35647.55	2024	5.84%	2024	25366.24	2024
Eswatini	−22.65	2023	−0.49%	2023		
Sint Maarten	0.14	2023	0.01%	2023		
Seychelles	−39.51	2023	−1.81%	2023		
Turks and Caicos Islands	−51.54	2018	−3.92%	2018		
Chad	−2.15	1999	−0.14%	1999		
Togo	−60.32	2023	−0.66%	2023		
Thailand	7800.99	2024	1.48%	2024		
Tajikistan	101.02	2024	0.71%	2024		
Timor-Leste	4.50	2024	0.24%	2024		
Tonga	1.25	2024	0.22%	2023		
Trinidad and Tobago	214.77	2024	0.81%	2024		
Tunisia	−12.44	2023	−0.03%	2023		
Turkey	6596.00	2024	0.50%	2024	5941.55	2024
Tuvalu	−0.92	2021	−1.52%	2021		
Tanzania	2.26	2003	0.01%	2003		
Uganda	0.38	2023	0.00%	2023		
Ukraine	305.00	2024	0.16%	2024		
Uruguay	−162.77	2024	−0.20%	2024		
United States	379072.00	2024	1.30%	2024	317442.00	2024
Uzbekistan	36.69	2024	0.03%	2024		
Saint Vincent and the Grenadines	−0.28	2024	−0.02%	2024		
Venezuela	1434.25	2023	0.94%	2014		
British Virgin Islands	44158.49	2023				
Vietnam	600.00	2024	0.13%	2024		
Vanuatu	4.40	2023	0.39%	2023		
Samoa	2.05	2024	0.19%	2024		
Kosovo	205.65	2023	1.96%	2023		
Yemen	3.33	2019	0.02%	2018		
South Africa	−1331.07	2024	−0.33%	2024	1205.76	2024
Zambia	117.00	2023	0.42%	2023		
Zimbabwe	30.50	2023	0.09%	2023		
SIDS (Small Island Developing States)						
SIDS: Caribbean	384.26	2024	0.97%	2023		
SIDS: Pacific	56.18	2024	0.41%	2023		
LDCs (Least developed countries)	216.09	2024	0.11%	2023		
Low & middle income economies (WB)	282331.47	2024	0.80%	2024		
Low-income economies (WB)	−44.11	2024	0.27%	2023		
Middle-income economies (WB)	282375.58	2024	0.80%	2024		
Lower middle income economies (WB)	28944.67	2024	0.47%	2024		
Upper middle income economies (WB)	253430.91	2024	0.87%	2024		
High-income economies (WB)	1271276.01	2024	1.82%	2024		
European Union	318937.86	2024	1.70%	2024	420150.89	2024
OECD	1090493.61	2024	1.60%	2024	1144981.63	2024
Note: The following countries have been removed for having no data or zero-value old data: Bhutan, Ecuador, Ethiopia, Lesotho, Maldives, Myanmar, Nepal, and Syria.

== See also ==
- List of countries by received FDI
