= Early stage innovation company =

An early stage innovation company is a concept created on 1 July 2016 in Australia originally proposed by Wyatt Roy's Policy Hackathon run by BlueChilli in 2015. An ESIC is able to attract early-stage investment capital from investors who are able to attract various taxation incentives, thereby enhancing the attractiveness of an ESIC to investors. Eligible investors include Australian tax residents and non-residents.

A summary of the tax incentives states "The new tax incentives will provide eligible investors with:

- a 20 percent non-refundable carry-forward tax offset on amounts invested in qualifying ESICs, with the offset capped at $200,000 per investor per year (on an affiliate-inclusive basis); and
- a 10-year exemption on capital gains tax for investments held as shares in an ESIC for at least 12 months, provided that the shares held do not constitute more than a 30 per cent interest in the ESIC."

The tax incentives are designed to promote this culture by connecting relevant early-stage companies with investors that have the requisite funds to assist entrepreneurs in developing successful innovative companies, particularly at the pre-commercialisation phase where a concept is in development, but the company requires additional investment to assist with commercialisation or further product development. To target the incentives to innovative activities, the early-stage company receiving the funding must satisfy two limbs:

- The first limb determines that the company is early stage, against criteria related to expenditure, assessable income, stock exchange listing, date of incorporation or ABN (Australian Business Number) registration date.
- The second limb determines that the company is involved in innovation, measured against criteria known as either a principles-based or objective test.

Australia operates under a self-assessment tax system whereby the onus is placed on taxpayers not the tax authorities. An appropriately skilled tax and investment expert in early-stage companies can assist in mitigating the risks of ensuring this targeted investment incentive ends up where the government intends it. As is the case with all aspects of Australia's tax laws, taxpayers can apply to the Australian Tax Office for a ruling/determination applicable to their specific circumstances.

To pass the objective test a company must secure 100 points by meeting criteria, in whole or in part, including; the prior year research and development tax ratio, receipt of an 'Accelerating Commercialization Grant', completion or undertaking an eligible accelerator program, receipt of $50,000 or more in share investment by a 3rd party, registration of an innovation or standard patent or plant breeders right or license thereon, co-development and commercialization of an innovation with a listed higher education provider or registered research and development partner.

For early-stage companies seeking to obtain an initial assessment of whether they qualify as an ESIC, a free predictor tools are available at ESIC Hub or ESIC Directory. The forms will take between 2–10 minutes to complete.

As a new category of company and investment capital type a range of information and guidance for innovators and investors Tax incentives for early stage investors.

The tests have been designed with stakeholder feedback in mind, to ensure they reflect industry concepts and remain flexible to new innovation.
