= Employees' State Insurance =

Statutory body of the Government of India

Employees' State Insurance Corporation

Statutory Body overview
- Formed: 24 February 1952 (74 years ago)
- Jurisdiction: India
- Headquarters: New Delhi
- Annual budget: ₹80,000 crore (US$8.3 billion) (as of 2021)
- Minister responsible: Mansukh Mandaviya
- Statutory Body executive: Ashok Kumar Singh, IAS, Director General
- Parent department: Ministry of Labour and Employment, Government of India
- Website: www.esic.gov.in

Employees' State Insurance Corporation (ESIC) is one of the two main statutory social security bodies under the administrative control of Ministry of Labour and Employment, Government of India, the other being the Employees' Provident Fund Organisation. The fund is managed by the Employees' State Insurance Corporation (ESIC) according to rules and regulations stipulated in the ESI Act 1948.

Administratively, the organisation is divided into zones that are headed by Zonal Medical Commissioner and Zonal Insurance Commissioner. At present, there are five Zones across India. The states have one Regional Office (RO) which is generally headed by an additional commissioner or Director rank officer; the Regional Offices are sub-divided into Sub-Regional offices (SRO) consisting several districts, SROs are headed by Director or Joint Director Rank officers. To assist Regional Directors, there are Deputy Directors, heading various units/ branches and looking after the enforcement of the Act and Schemes. State Medical Officer (SMO), Medical Referee (MR) and Medical Vigilance Officer (MVO), a medical officer from GDMO sub-cadre are posted in Zonal offices / Regional offices to look after the medical administrative work of the region. Many district offices have an Assistant Director or a Social Security Officer, SSO to implement the scheme and to attend grievances.

Across the country, there are ESIC Medical Colleges headed by Dean (SAG level Officer from Teaching Sub-cadre of Medical Officer), ESIC Hospitals headed by Medical Superintendent (SAG level Officer from GDMO/Specialist sub-cadre of Medical Officer) and ESIC Dispensary/ Dispensary cum Branch Office (DCBO) headed by IMO I/C (Officer from GDMO sub-cadre of Medical Officer) to provide medical services to the insured persons and beneficiaries. Deputy Director and Assistant Director are also posted in ESIC Hospitals and Medical Colleges to assist the Dean and Medical Superintendent in administrative works. Similarly Social Security Officer (SSO)/Manager are posted in DCBO to assist IMO I/C in administrative work relating to implementation of scheme and provision of cash benefits.

The total sanctioned manpower of the ESIC is at present more than 21,000 including all levels. The Deputy Directors are recruited directly, competitively, through the Union Public Service Commission of India as well as through promotion from lower ranks. Subordinate Officers are also recruited directly by ESIC in addition to promotion from the staff cadres.

Medical Officers of ESIC are recruited directly through competitive written exam and/or Personal Interview in different sub-cadres viz. GDMO sub-cadre, Non-Teaching Specialist Sub-Cadre and Teaching Specialist Sub-Cadre with pay analogous to Central Health Services. In 2024, Employees' State Insurance Corporation (ESIC) announced recruitment to the posts of IMO Grade-II (GDMO Sub-Cadre) through the disclosure lists of UPSC Combined Medical Services Examination conducted in the years 2022 and 2023.

Nursing Officers of ESIC are also recruited directly, competitively through the Union Public Service Commission of India.

== History ==
In March 1943, Bhalchandra Pundarik (BP) Adarkar was appointed by the Government of India to create a report on the health insurance scheme for industrial workers. The report became the basis for the Employment State Insurance (ESI) Act of 1948. The promulgation of Employees’ State Insurance Act, 1948 envisaged an integrated need-based social insurance scheme that would protect the interest of workers in contingencies such as sickness, maternity, temporary or permanent physical disablement, death due to employment injury resulting in loss of wages or earning capacity. The Act also guarantees reasonably good medical care to workers and their immediate dependents. Following the promulgation of the ESI Act the Central Govt. set up the ESI Corporation to administer the Scheme. The Scheme thereafter was first implemented at Kanpur and Delhi on 24 February 1952. The Act further absolved the employers of their obligations under the Maternity Benefit Act, 1961 and Workmen's Compensation Act 1923. The benefits provided to the employees under the Act are also in conformity with ILO conventions.

The act was initially intended for factory workers but later became applicable to all establishments having 10 or more workers. As of 31 March 2016, the total beneficiaries are 82.8 million.

== ESI Act ==
Employees' State Insurance Corporation (ESIC), established by ESI Act, is an statutory organisation under Ministry of Labour and Employment, Government of India. As it is a legal entity, the corporation can raise loans and take measures for discharging such loans with the prior sanction of the central government and it can acquire both movable and immovable property and all incomes from the property shall vest with the corporation. The corporation can set up hospitals either independently or in collaboration with state government. There are ESIC Medical Colleges, Hospitals and Dispensaries throughout the country run directly by the corporation under the Ministry of Labour & Employment along with ESIS hospitals and dispensaries which are run by respective state governments. The ESIC has its offices throughout the country with Jurisdiction further dividing into Regional Offices(ROs) & Sub- Regional Offices(SROs).

== Benefits ==
As per the section 46 of the ESI Act, 1948, six benefits are envisaged to its subscribers.

1- Medical benefit

2- Sickness benefit

3- Maternity benefit

4- Disablement benefit

5- Dependants benefit

6- funeral expenses

For all employees earning ₹21,000 (US$220) or less per month as wages, the employer contributes 3.25% and the employee contributes 0.75%, total share 4%. This fund is managed by the ESI Corporation (ESIC) according to rules and regulations stipulated there in the ESI Act 1948, which oversees the provision of medical and cash benefits to the employees and their family. ESI scheme is a type of social security scheme for employees in the organised sector.

The employees registered under the scheme are entitled to medical treatment for themselves and their dependents, unemployment cash benefit in certain contingencies and maternity benefit in case of women employees. In case of employment-related disablement or death, there is provision for a disablement benefit and a family pension respectively. Outpatient medical facilities are available in 1418 ESI dispensaries and through 1,678 registered medical practitioners. Inpatient care is available in 145 ESI hospitals and 42 hospital annexes with a total of 19,387 beds. In addition, several state government hospitals also have beds for the exclusive use of ESI Beneficiaries. Cash benefits can be availed in any of 830 ESI centres throughout India.

Recent years have seen an increasing role of information technology in ESI, with the introduction of Pehchan smart cards as a part of Project Panchdeep. In addition to insured workers, poor families eligible under the Rashtriya Swasthya Bima Yojana can also avail facilities in ESI hospitals and dispensaries. ESI Corporation also runs medical, nursing and paramedical schools in some ESI hospitals across India.

== Medical and dental colleges ==
Employees' State Insurance Corporation runs medical, dental, nursing and paramedical schools in many locations across India. Presently, there are 11 medical colleges and 2 dental colleges established by the ESI Corporation. These colleges admit students on the basis of marks obtained in the competitive examinations conducted at the central level, the National Eligibility cum Entrance Test (NEET-UG).

There are 8 Medical Colleges managed by the Ministry of Labour and Employment, Government of India under the ESI Corporation. They are:

1. ESIC Medical College and PGIMSR, Rajaji Nagar, Bengaluru, Karnataka
2. ESIC Medical College and PGIMSR, K. K. Nagar, Chennai, Tamil Nadu
3. ESI-PGIMSR & ESIC Medical College and Hospital, Joka, West Bengal
4. ESIC Medical College and PGIMSR, Faridabad, Haryana
5. ESIC Medical College and PGIMSR, Sanath Nagar, Hyderabad, Telangana
6. ESIC Medical College and PGIMSR, Kalaburagi, Karnataka
7. ESIC Medical College, Alwar, Rajasthan
8. ESIC Medical College and Hospital, Patna, Bihar
9. ESIC Medical College & Hospital, Beltola, Guwahati

The administration of the remaining 3 medical colleges have been handed over to the respective State Governments under various MoU. They were established by the ESI Corporation but are managed by the state government since inception. They are:

- Government Medical College, Kollam, Kerala.
- Shri Lal Bahadur Shastri Government Medical College & Hospital Mandi, Himachal Pradesh.
- Government Medical College & ESI Hospital, Coimbatore

The Dental colleges run by the ESI Corporation are -

1. ESIC Dental college and Hospital, Rohini, New Delhi.
2. ESIC Dental College, Kalaburagi, Karnataka.

The Government of India plans to construct 20 more ESI Medical Colleges in various cities across India in the upcoming years.

== New Amendment ==
The Employees’ State Insurance Corporation (ESIC) raised the monthly wage limit to Rs. 21,000 from the existing Rs. 15,000, for coverage with effect from 1 January 2017. The rate of contribution was reduced from 6.5% to 4% (employer's share 3.25% and employee's share 0.75%) effective from 1 July 2019.

== Landmark Judgements ==
=== ESIC v/s Builders' Association of India ===
Supreme Court of India Stays the applicability of the Employees' State Insurance to the Construction Workers.

=== ESIC vs Texmo Industries ===
Conveyance/Travelling Allowance not to be consider as Wages under Sec. 2(22) of ESIC.
