= Climate and Development =

- Discipline: Development studies, climate change
- Language: English
- Edited by: E. Lisa F. Schipper and Jonathan Ensor

Publication details
- History: 2009-present
- Publisher: Routledge Taylor and Francis
- Frequency: 10/year
- Impact factor: 4.3 (2022)

Standard abbreviations
- ISO 4: Clim. Dev.

Indexing
- ISSN: 1756-5529 (print); 1756-5537 (web)
- LCCN: 2010238893
- OCLC no.: 320788166

Links
- Journal homepage; Online access; Online archive

Climate and Development is a peer-reviewed interdisciplinary scientific journal covering issues that arise due to climate change, climate variability, and climate policy along with development needs, impacts and priorities. It was established in 2009 and is published by Taylor and Francis. The Editors-in-Chief are E. Lisa F. Schipper (University of Bonn) and Jonathan Ensor (Stockholm Environment Institute) (since October 2018). The founding editor-in-chief was Richard J.T. Klein (Stockholm Environment Institute).

== Abstracting and indexing ==
The journal is abstracted and indexed in:

- CAB Abstracts
- Current Contents/Social & Behavioral Sciences
- EBSCO databases
- GEOBASE
- Scopus
- Social Sciences Citation Index

According to the Journal Citation Reports, the journal has a 2022 impact factor of 4.3.
