= ESIC Medical College, Faridabad =

Government Post-graduate Medical College

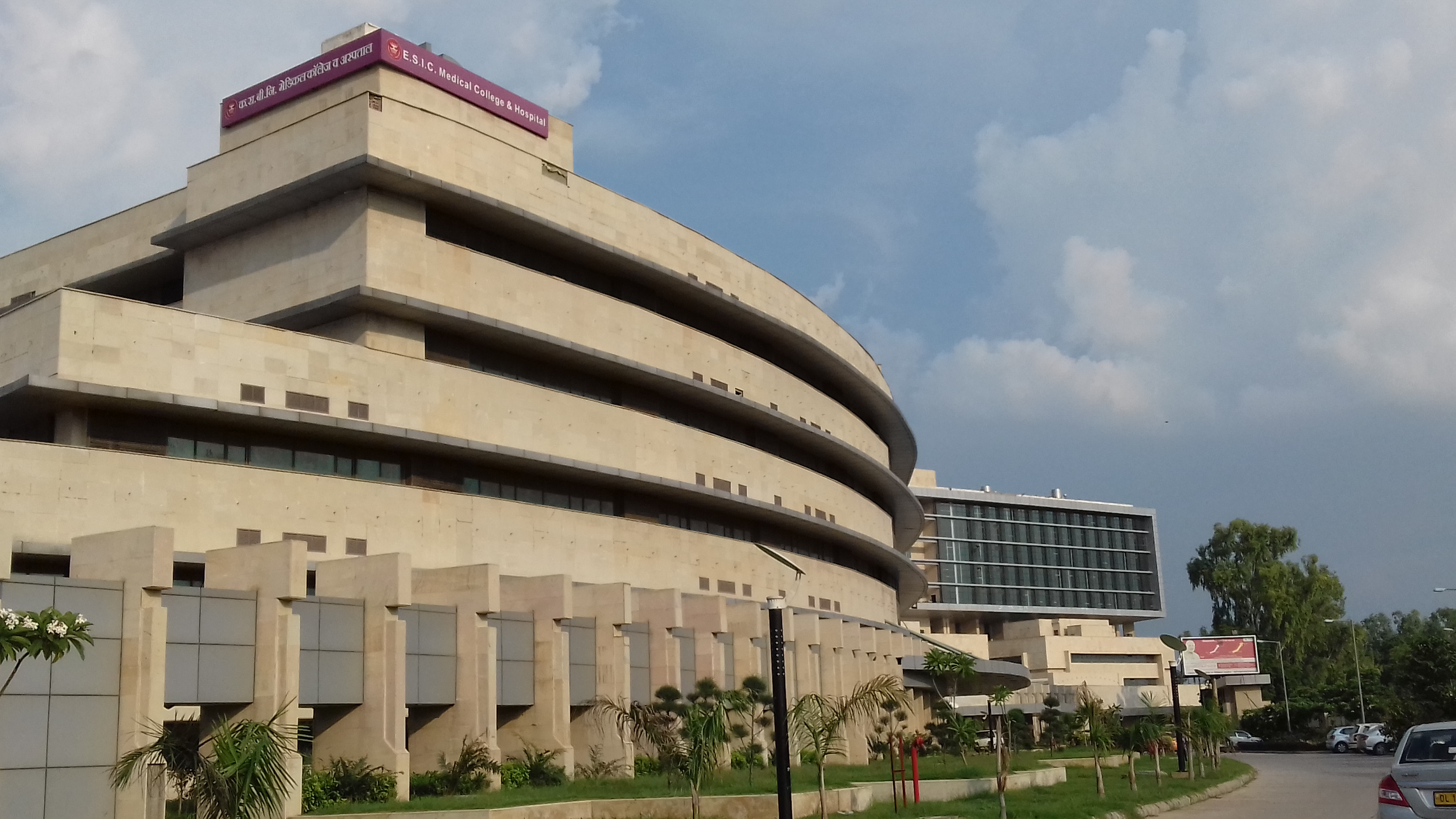
- Academic Block with the Hospital in the Backdrop
- Motto: We Dare To Care
- Type: Autonomous Medical College under ESIC, Ministry of Labour and Employment, Government of India
- Established: 2015; 11 years ago
- Affiliations: Pandit Bhagwat Dayal Sharma University of Health Sciences, NMC
- Endowment: 300 Crore
- Dean: Dr. Anil Kumar Pandey
- Undergraduates: 150 per year
- Postgraduates: 102 per year including MD, MS, DM, MCh, DrNB
- Doctoral students: 10
- Location: Faridabad, Haryana, India
- Campus: Urban
- Website: mcfaridabad.esic.gov.in
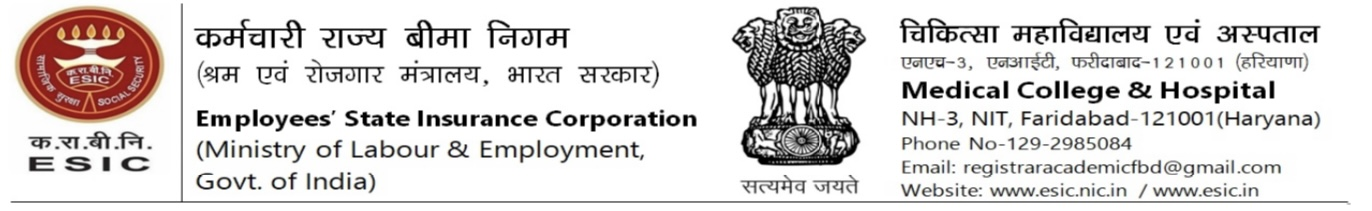

ESIC Medical College & Hospital, Faridabad, or in its full name Employees' State Insurance Corporation Medical College and Hospital, Faridabad, is a Government co-educational Medical College located at New Industrial Township-3, Faridabad, the industrial capital of India in Haryana, India. It was established in 2015 under the aegis of the ESI Corporation, a central autonomous body under Ministry of Labour and Employment, Government of India. Faridabad is a part of the National Capital Region, India (NCR) adjoining Delhi, the Capital City of India. It is affiliated to Pandit Bhagwat Dayal Sharma University of Health Sciences, Rohtak. The college is attached to a 1150-bedded multi-speciality hospital which was built in 2013 but became operational in 2014. The campus is spread in over 30 acres and provides primary and tertiary healthcare facilities to the workers insured under the ESI corporation and is one of the tertiary care referral center for smaller ESI clinic and dispensaries.

== Departments ==
- Anatomy
- Physiology
- Biochemistry
- Pathology
- Pharmacology
- Microbiology
- Forensic Medicine and Toxicology
- Immunohaematology and Blood Transfusion
- Community Medicine
- Oto-Rhino-Laryngology, Head & Neck Surgery
- Ophthalmology
- General Medicine
- General Surgery
- Obstetrics and Gynaecology
- Paediatrics and Neonatology
- Orthopaedics
- Respiratory Medicine(Pulmonology)
- Dermatology, Venereology and Leprosy
- Psychiatry
- Radiology
- Interventional Radiology
- Anaesthesiology, Pain and Critical Care
- Emergency Medicine
- Physical Medicine and Rehabilitation
- Dentistry
- Urology and Genito-Urinary Surgery
- Reproductive Medicine and Surgery
- Plastic & Reconstructive Surgery
- Medical Gastroenterology
- Surgical Gastroenterology
- Medical Oncology
- Radiation Oncology
- Surgical Oncology
- Cardiology
- Nephrology
- Rheumatology
- Endocrinology
- Neurosurgery
- Cardiothoracic and Vascular Surgery
- Paediatric Surgery
- Occupational Therapy

== Courses Offered ==
- Undergraduate: MBBS intake of 150 seats
- Postgraduate: MD/MS intake of 87 seats
- Super-Speciality: DM/MCh intake of 12 seats, DrNB intake of 3 seats
- Doctor of Philosophy in Biomedical Sciences: PhD intake of 5 seats
- Associate Fellow of Industrial Health (AFIH) 3 months course intake of 60 seats

Break-up of PG seats

- MD Anaesthesiology 7
- MD Anatomy 3
- MD Bio-Chemistry 4
- MD Community Medicine 3
- MD Dermatology, Venereology & Leprosy 1
- MD Emergency Medicine 4
- MD Forensic Medicine 2
- MD General Medicine 8
- MD Immunohaematology & Blood Transfusion 2
- MD Microbiology 3
- MD Paediatrics 5
- MD Pathology 3
- MD Pharmacology 3
- MD Physical Medicine & Rehabilitation 3
- MD Physiology 3
- MD Psychiatry 2
- MD Respiratory Medicine 2
- MD Radio-Diagnosis 5
- MS General Surgery 8
- MS Obstetrics & Gynaecology 8
- MS Ophthalmology 3
- MS Orthopaedics 2
- MS Otorhinolaryngology 3

Break-up of SS seats

- DM Cardiology 2
- DM Critical Care Medicine 3
- MCh Neurosurgery 2
- MCh Paediatric Surgery 2
- MCh Plastic & Reconstructive Surgery 3
- DrNB Medical Oncology 3

The Doctoral Degree Programme: ESIC Medical College Hospital & PGIMSR, Faridabad is affiliated to the Regional Centre for Biotechnology, Faridabad (An Institution of National Importance, established by the Department of Biotechnology, Government of India, under the aegis of UNESCO). The institute offers a Doctoral Research Programme for awarding Ph.D. degree to the students holding medical graduate and/or postgraduate degree, postgraduate degree in science or technology. The programme is suited for candidates looking for multidisciplinary clinical and translational health research. The college offers the Ph.D. programme in Biomedical Sciences as a broad speciality with specific focuses on the following subspecialities:

- Maternal & Child Health
- Cardiopulmonary Physiology & Medicine
- Molecular Biology & Genetic Engineering
- Neurosciences
- Structural Biology & Bioinformatics
- Reproductive Medicine
- Cell & Developmental Biology
- Integrative Medicine (AYUSH)
- Immunology & Immunotechnology
- Oral & Dental Sciences
- Survival Analysis & Clinical Trials
- Clinical Physiology
- Neurophysiology

== Hospital Facilities ==
The hospital offers medical facilities which includes emergency, OPD services, 10 Modular Operation Theatres, Labour Room, ICU, HDU, CCU, NICU, PICU, Physiotherapy, MRI, CT, Ultrasound scan and IPD services. It also houses a regional dialysis centre. It was declared a dedicated COVID hospital by the Government of Haryana in April with 510 isolation beds, 60 bedded ICU with 24 ventilators and finest diagnostic facilities.

The hospital established Haryana's first plasma bank at its Blood Bank Unit. It was jointly inaugurated by then Hon'ble CM of Haryana, Shri Manohar Lal Khattar and Shri Santosh Kumar Gangwar, MoS (Independent Charge), Ministry of Labour and Employment, Govt of India on 7 August 2020.

Treatment of Reproductive Medicine, Nephrology, Cardiology & Cardio Vascular & Thoracic Surgery, Immunology & Rheumatology, Endocrinology, Urology & Genito-Urinary Surgery, Medical & Surgical Oncology, Medical & Surgical Gastroenterology, Neurology & Neurosurgery, Plastic Surgery are provided. The hospital achieved a significant milestone by becoming North India’s first ESIC Hospital to perform a kidney transplant, giving a ray of hope to many renal patients enrolled with ESIC.

Bone Marrow Transplant Unit is also functional with the first successful transplant performed in October 2021, making it one of the few Government centres in the country to offer BMT. It is the second tertiary health care centre after AIIMS Delhi to have a dedicated Bone Marrow Transplant Unit in National Capital Region.

The hospital premise also houses a state of the art Cardiac Centre with 40 beds and Primary/Elective PCI Catheterization Laboratory with Surgical Backup.

The Hospital now has expanded to over 1150 beds with 60 ICU Beds. Rare Diseases Clinic is also organised every twice-weekly in collaboration with the Paediatric Department. The centre also became the first in Haryana to establish a Genetic Lab for diagnosis of rare genetic conditions.

== Gallery ==
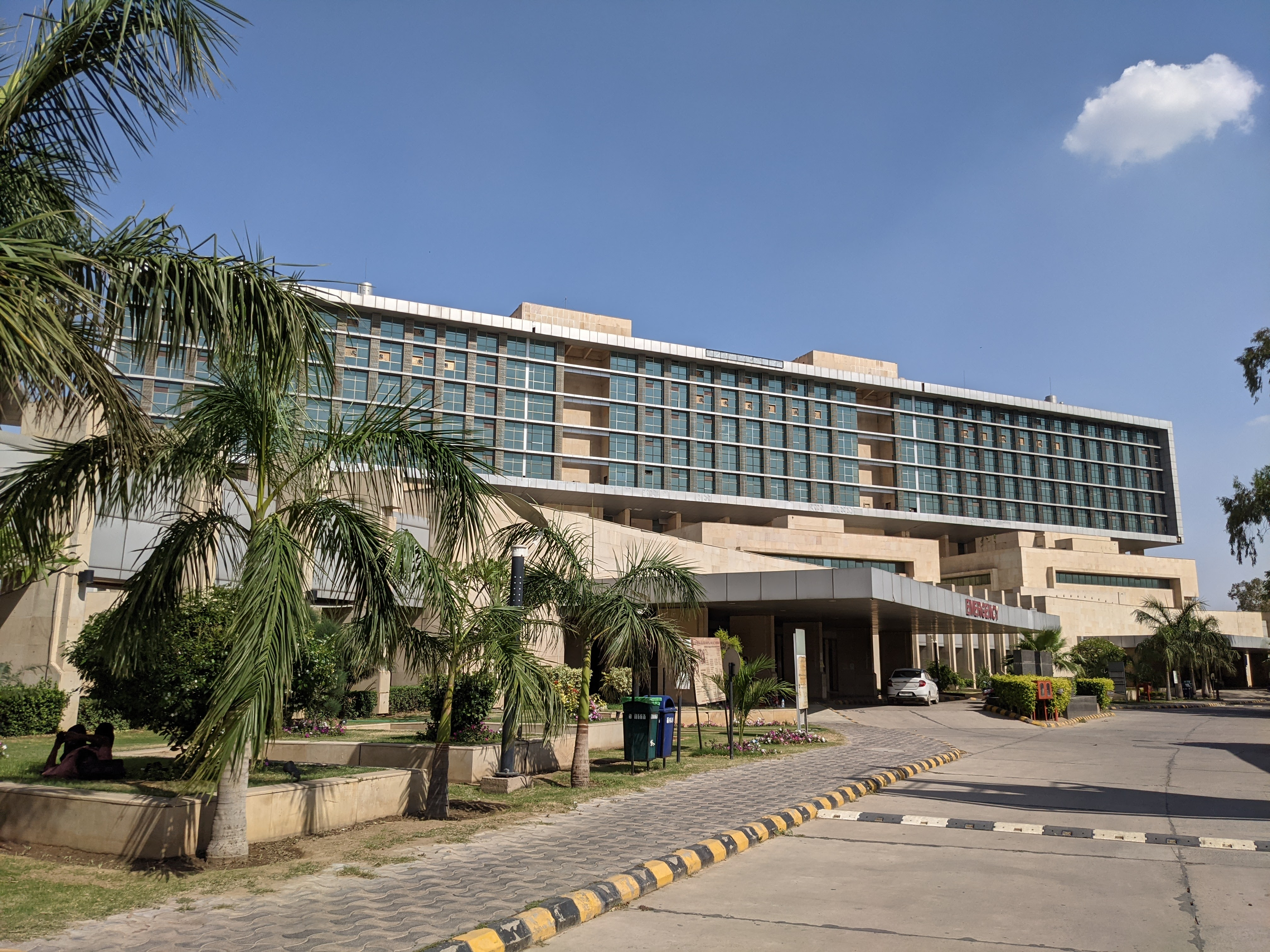
ESIC

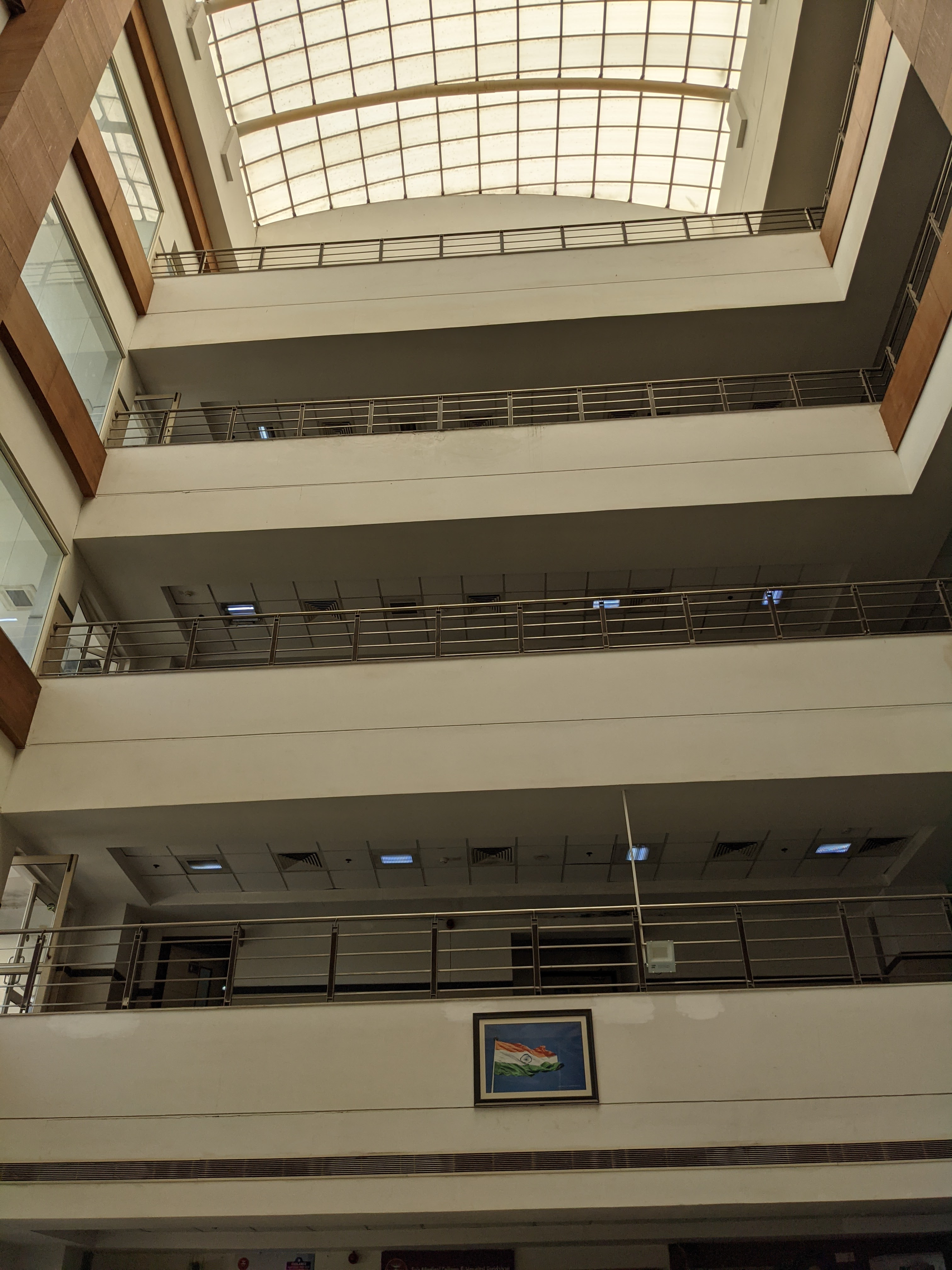
ESIC (Inside view)

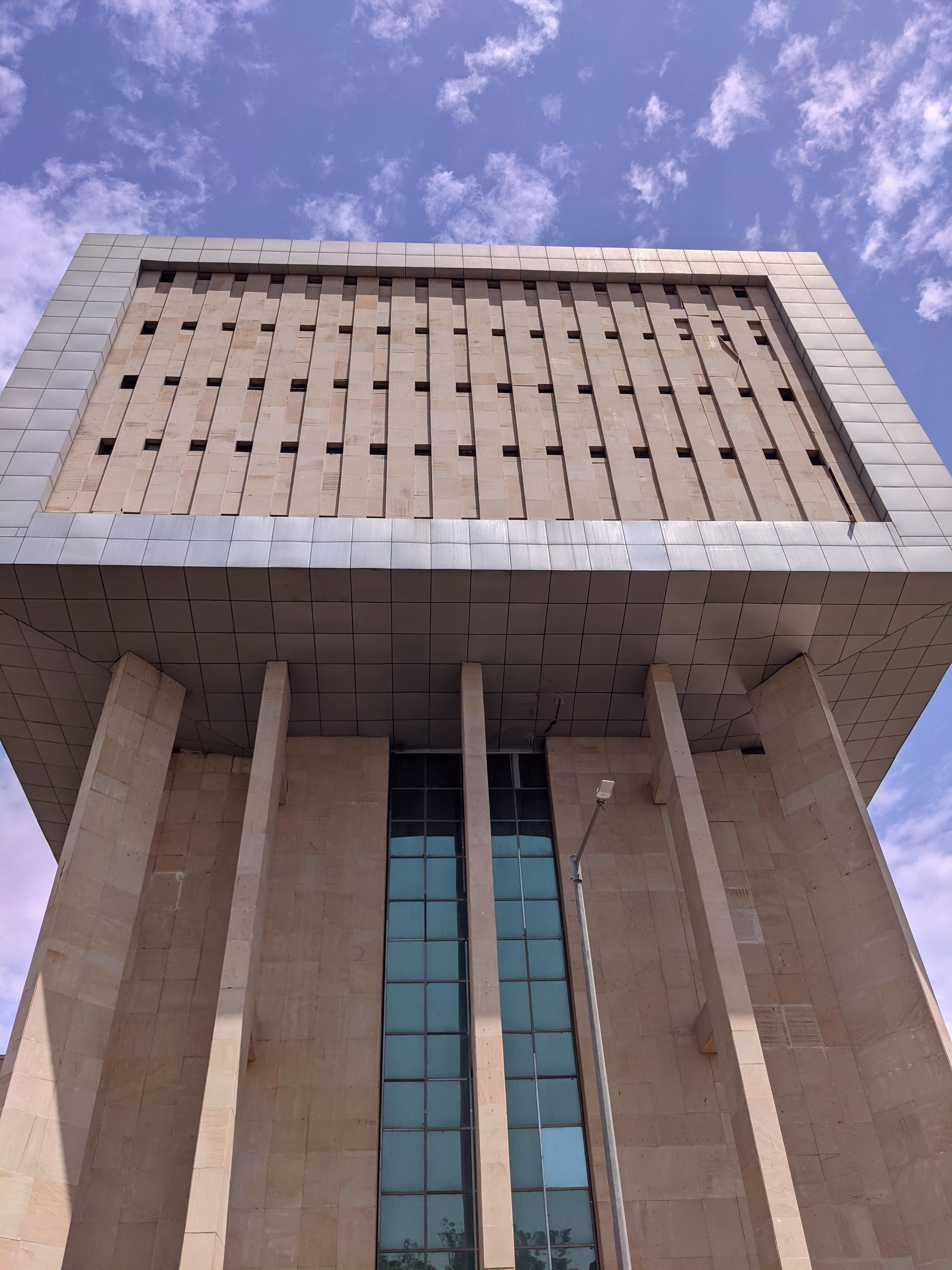
ESIC (outside view 1)

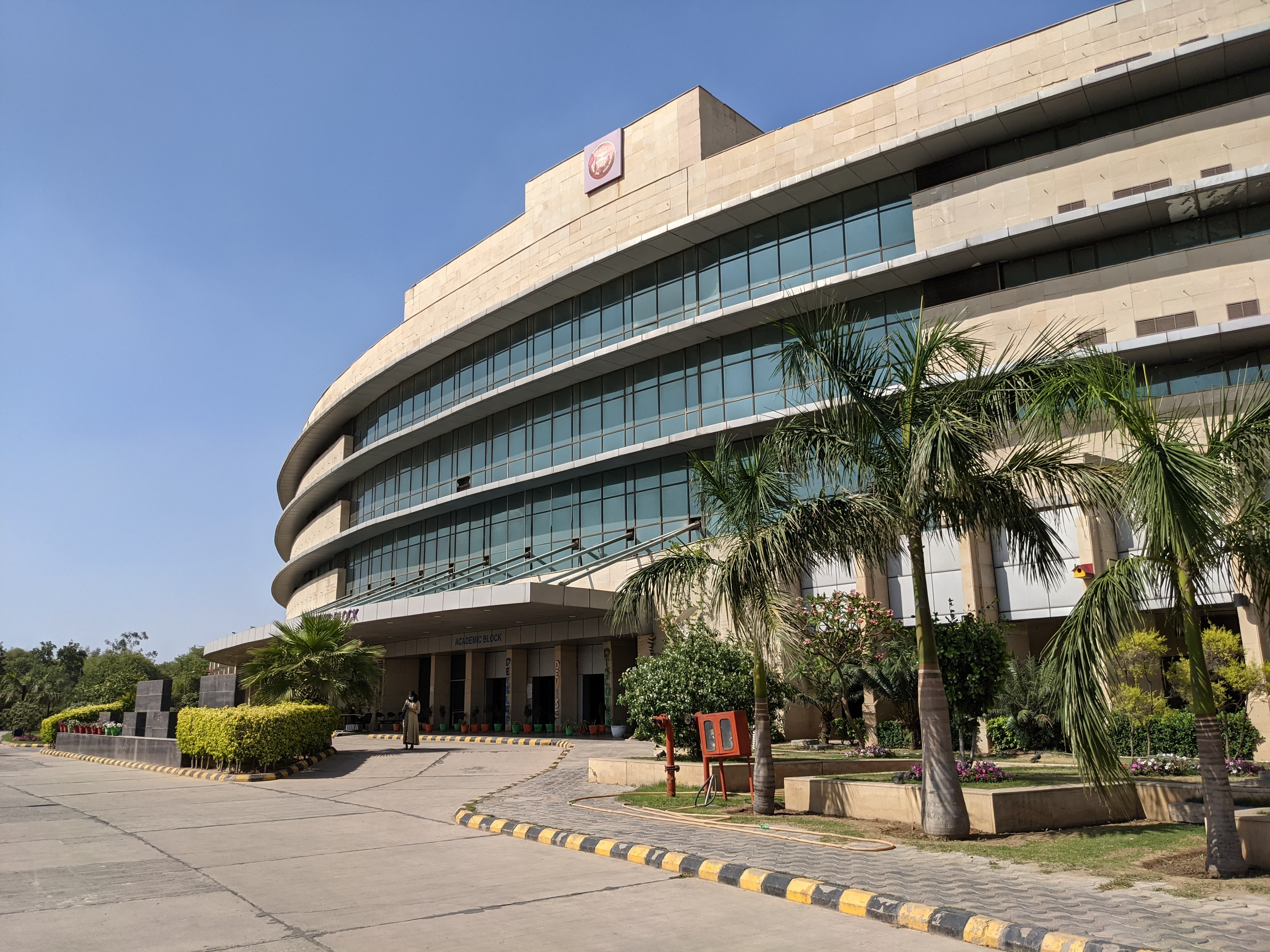
Academic block

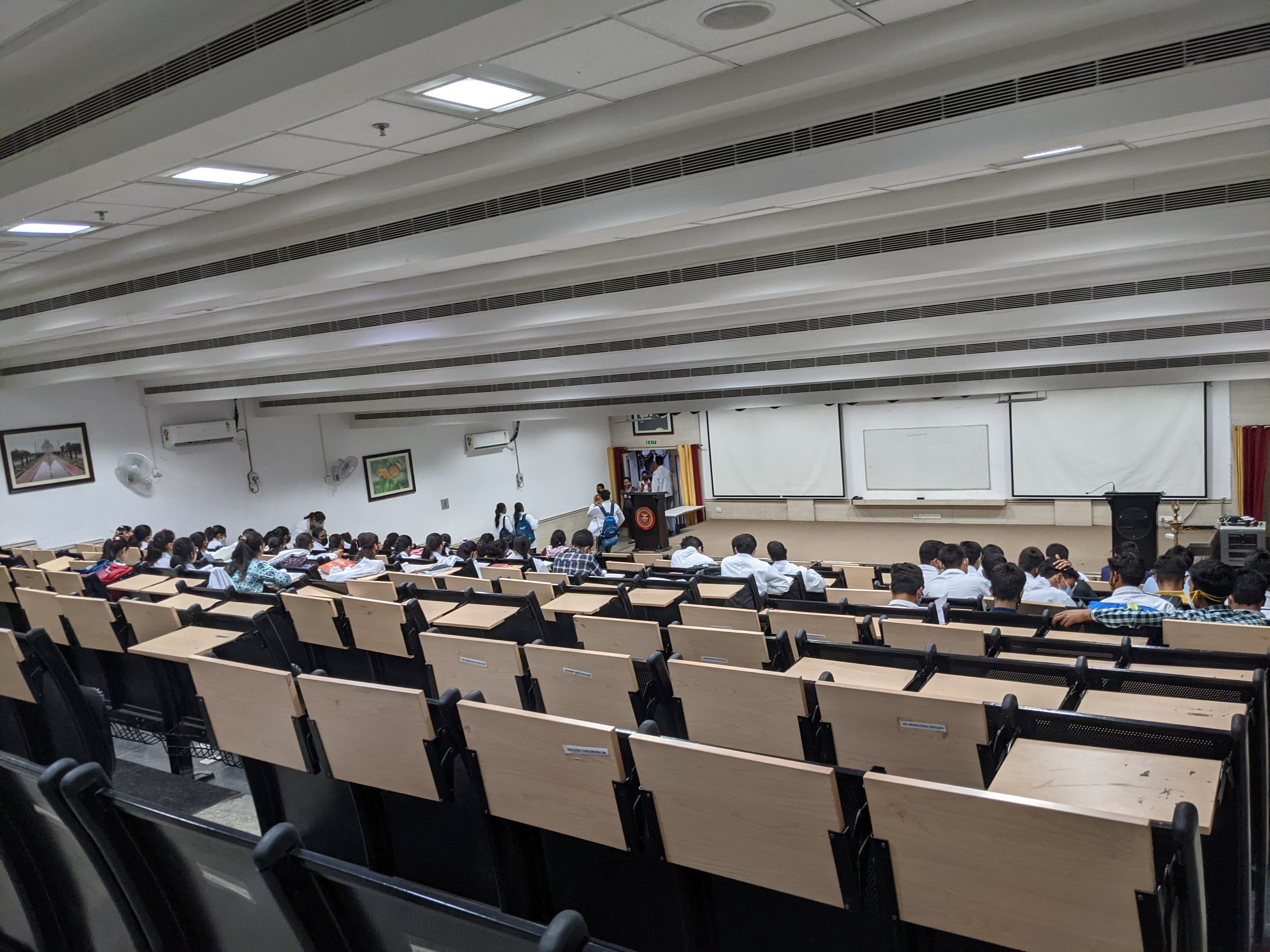
Class room ESIC

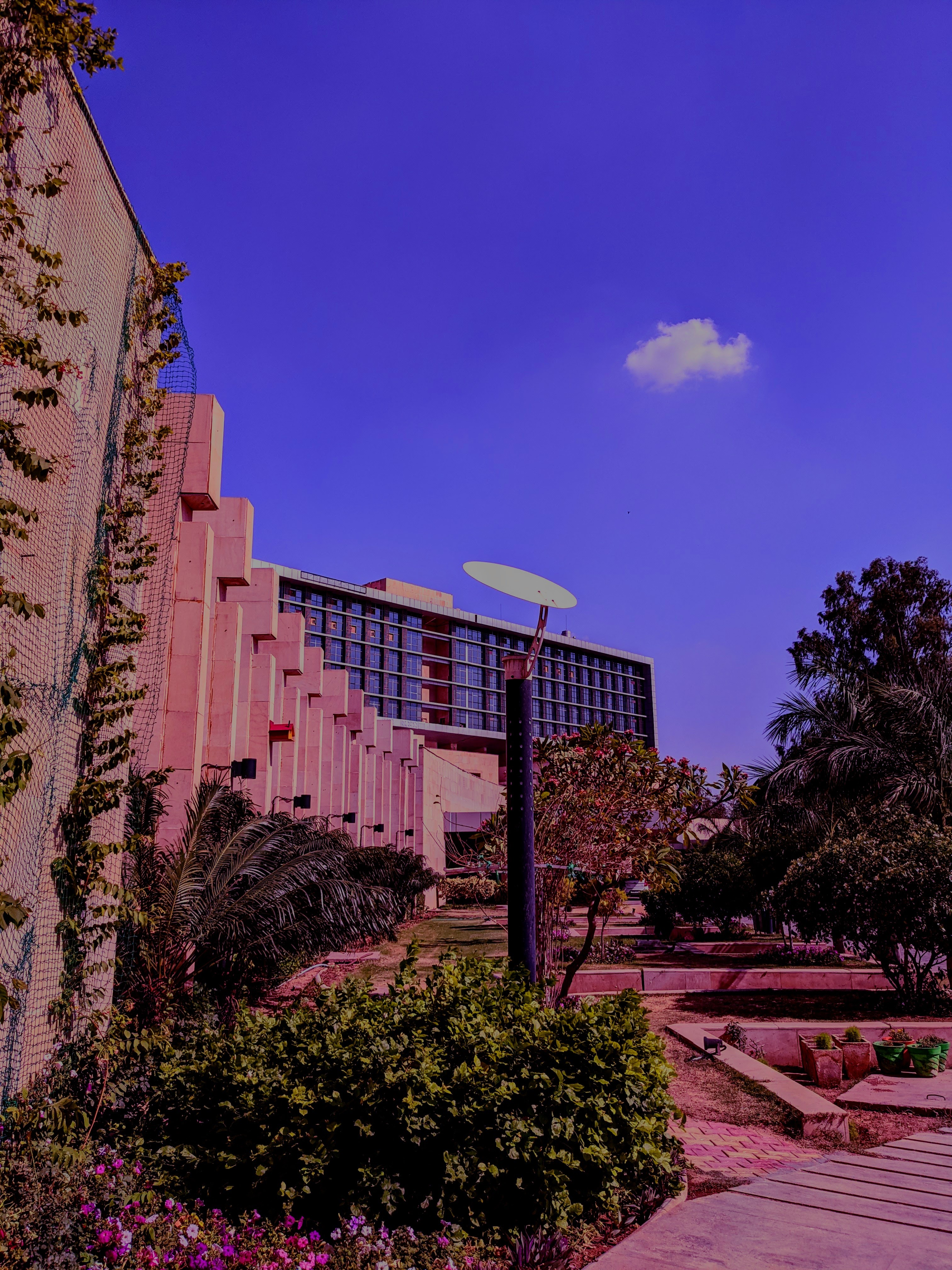
ESIC (outside view 2)

== See also ==
- List of medical colleges in Haryana
