= ESIC Medical College, Kolkata =

Medical School in Kolkata, India

ESI-PGIMSR & ESIC Medical College and Hospital, Joka
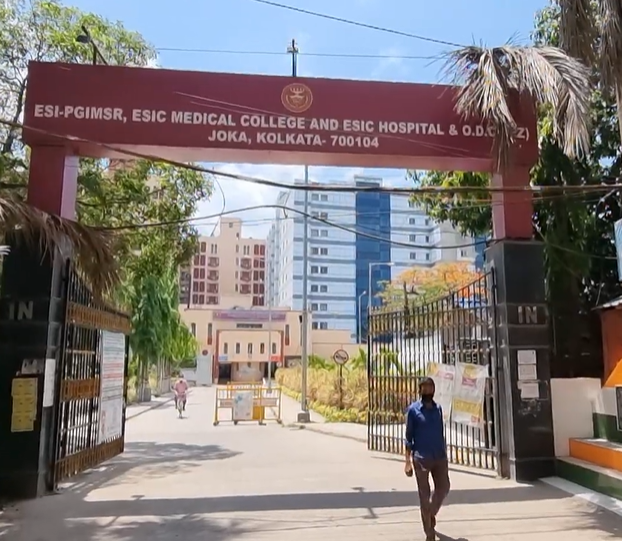
- Recognition: NMC; INC
- Type: Public Medical School
- Established: 2013; 13 years ago
- Academic affiliations: West Bengal University of Health Sciences
- Budget: ₹40.07 crore (US$4.2 million) (FY2023–24 est.)
- Dean: Dr. Sanjay Keshkar
- Academic staff: 170 (2025)
- Students: 674 (2025)
- Undergraduates: 599 (2025)
- Postgraduates: 75 (2025)
- Location: Joka, West Bengal, India; 22°27′9.59″N 88°17′53.56″E
- Campus: Large city
- Website: mckolkata.esic.gov.in

Employees State Insurance-Post Graduate Institute of Medical Sciences and Research & Employees State Insurance Corporation Medical College and Hospital, Joka, is a NMC recognised medical college established in 2013 under the aegis of the ESI Corporation, an autonomous body, controlled by Government of India.

This college received permission for 100 seats for this session from the National Medical Commission and is affiliated to the West Bengal University of Health Sciences. Now it is permitted for 125 seats for MBBS. The college has admitted its students through the NEET AIQ (15%), State quota (35%) and IP quota (50%) since 2013. In April 2023 NMC selected the institution as a recognised Regional Centre for Medical Education Technology (RCMET) to facilitate the training of medical college faculties.

== Infrastructure ==
=== Lecture theaters ===
- College Building 4th floor: 150 capacity, gallery type
- College Building 5th floor: 250 capacity, gallery type
- College Building 6th floor: 120 capacity, gallery type
- College Building 7th floor: 120 capacity, gallery type
- Old Hospital Building 9th floor: 150 capacity, gallery type

=== Examination hall ===
- College Building 2nd floor: 250 capacity

=== Students' hostel (MBBS) ===
- Boys’ hostel 1 Block (G+15), with 32 rooms in each floor (within college campus)
- Girls’ hostel 1 Blocks (G+15), with 32 rooms in each floor (within college campus)
- First year boys' hostel (G+3)-2 buildings, with 16 capacity in each floor (within college campus)
- First year girls' hostel (G+3)-2 buildings, with 16 capacity on each floor (Within college campus)

=== Interns' hostel ===
- Intern boys’: capacity 100 (within college campus)
- Intern girls’: capacity 50 (within college campus)

=== Sports and recreation facilities ===
- Playground for badminton, volleyball, football
- Gymnasium facilities
- Auditorium
- Guest house within campus
- Canteen
- Indoor playground for Table Tennis and other sports

== See also ==
- Calcutta National Medical College
- List of hospitals in India
