= ESIC Medical College, Alwar =

Indian medical college

- Motto: सामाजिक सुरक्षा (Social Security)
- Established: 2017; 9 years ago
- Affiliations: Rajasthan University of Health Sciences, NMC
- Dean: Dr. Asim Das
- Undergraduates: 100 per year ( Since year 2021 Batch)
- Location: Matsya Industrial Area, Alwar, Rajasthan, India; 27.5248°N 76.6804°E
- Website: www.esic.nic.in/medical/esic-medical-college-alwar

ESIC Medical College, Alwar, known in full as Employees State Insurance Corporation Medical College, Alwar, is a co-educational medical college located in Alwar, Rajasthan, India. It was established (partially active) with 50 beds in operation.

== History ==
The college was constructed by Uttar Pradesh Rajkiya Nirman Nigam Limited in 2016 and handed over to ESIC in 2017. The college has a capacity of 500 general beds and 250 dynamic beds, but due to disputes among the authorities only a 50-bed hospital could be started.

== Campus ==
The medical college building is equipped with modern technology. Also, 200 flats are constructed for the doctors and staff members.

== Controversy ==
The medical college has been in controversy since its construction due to a dispute between centre and state governments. Till now, there is no confirmation when the college will work in full effect.
