= Jawaharlal Nehru Medical College, Ajmer =

Government medical college in Ajmer (Rajasthan), India

Jawaharlal Nehru Medical College
- जवाहरलाल नेहरू आयुर्विज्ञान महाविद्यालय
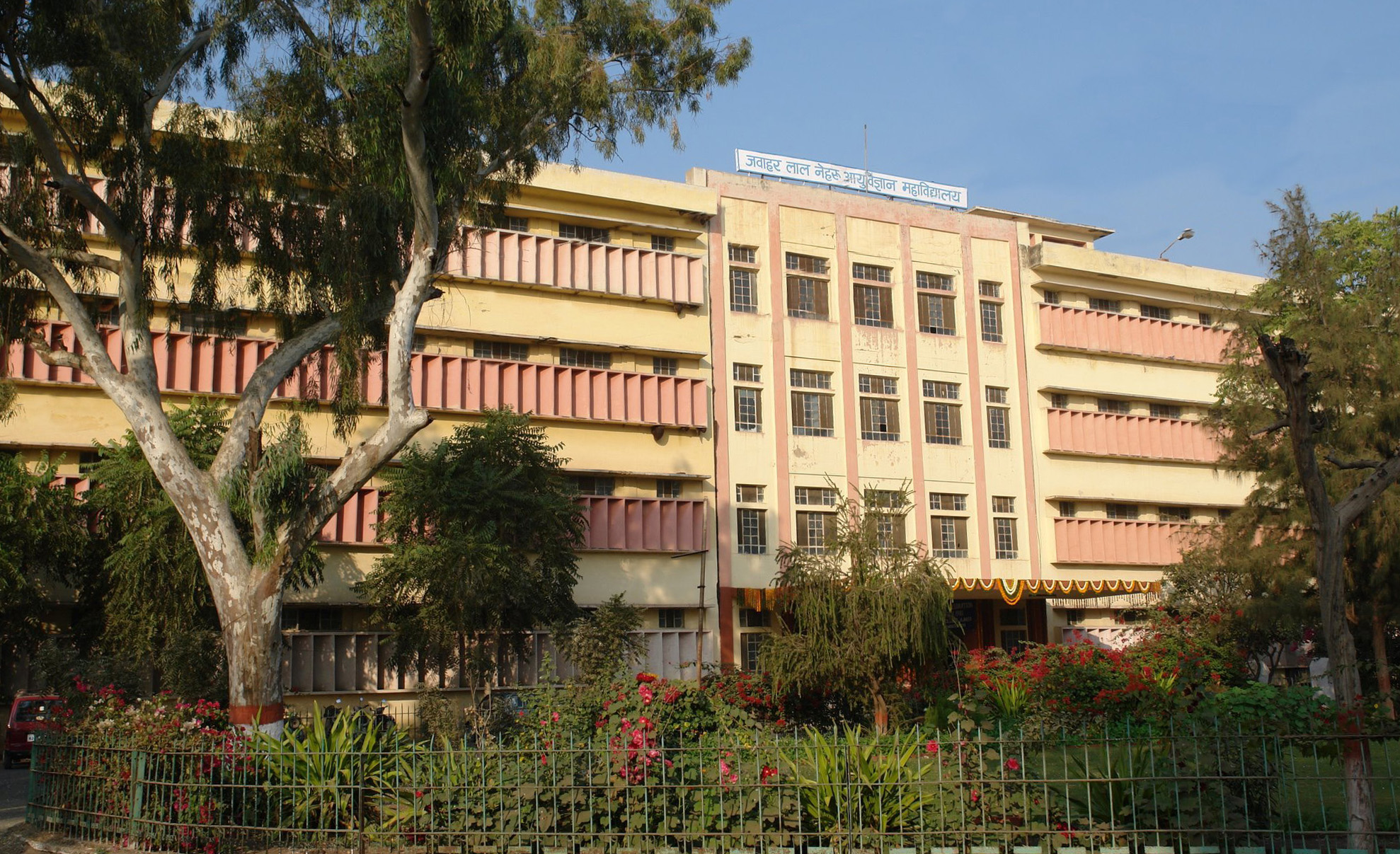
- Building housing Pre and Para clinical Departments
- Former names: Victoria General Hospital
- Motto: सेवा ही परमं तपः
- Motto in English: Service is the supreme sacrifice.
- Type: Government
- Established: 27 December 1965; 60 years ago
- Affiliations: Rajasthan University of Health Sciences
- President: Minister of Health and Family Welfare, Government of Rajasthan
- Principal: Dr. Anil Samaria
- Undergraduates: 250 per year
- Postgraduates: 88 (as of 2014)
- Other students: MSc., BSc.
- Location: Kala Bagh, Ajmer, Rajasthan, 305001, India; 26.468°N 74.635°E
- Campus: Multiple, Urban
- Language: English, Hindi
- Recognition: National Medical Commission
- Website: Official Website
- NMC recognized since 1973

Jawaharlal Nehru Medical College, Ajmer is a government medical college located in Ajmer (Rajasthan), India. Established in 1965, it is one of six government-run medical colleges in the western state of Rajasthan, and the fourth to be established in the state. It is affiliated with RUHS (the Rajasthan University of Health Sciences), and provides education leading to the Bachelor of Medicine, Bachelor of Surgery (MBBS) degree (recognized by NMC since 1973) and the MS/MD/DM degrees. It also offers diplomas and other degrees in medical disciplines. Before the establishment of RUHS, in 2005, it was affiliated with University of Rajasthan. It publishes the Ajaymeru Journal of Medical Education and Research (AJMER).

== History ==
Jawaharlal Nehru Medical College was established in 1965 with Dr. S. P. Wanchoo, the superintendent of New Victoria Hospital, as its first Principal and Controller. It is named after the first Prime Minister of India, Jawaharlal Nehru. The medical school started its operations in the old TB hospital building, moving to new buildings in 1967. J.L.N. Medical College, Ajmer was first among all the medical colleges in Rajasthan to establish a Cardiology division in the year 1989. Initially in the year 1964, a cardiology clinic was started with the efforts of Dr. N.C. Malik and Dr. R. N. Mathur which use to provide services once in a week. Subsequently, until 1988, a polygraph in the cardiology lab, non-invasive lab and a pacemaker lab were established.

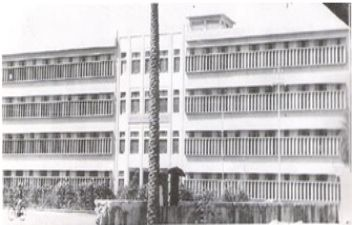
Newly built JLN Medical College, Ajmer building in 1967

It started with an undergraduate intake of 50 students per year, subsequently increasing to 100 and then 150 per year. It celebrated its Golden Jubilee year in December 2015.

== Campus ==
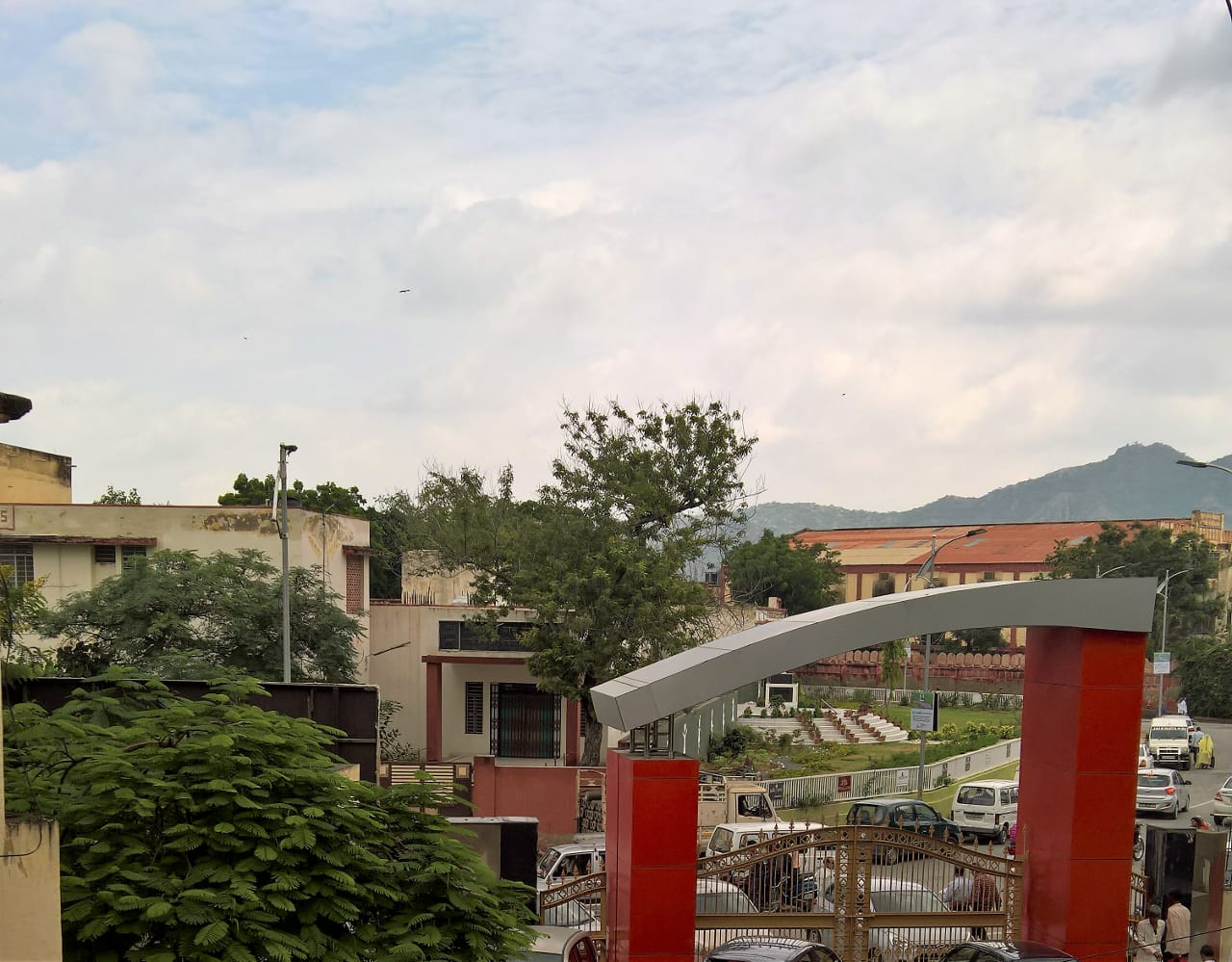
View from JLN Academic section with Golden Jubilee Gate, Psychiatric & Oncology depts. in front, in the backdrop of JLN Circle and Moolchand Chauhan Indoor Stadium .

The main college campus is located in the heart of the city of Amjer. Most departments are on the main campus, with the exception of the Obstetrics and Gynaecology department, which is 7 km away on a separate campus. The Microbiology department houses the Rajasthan State Reference Laboratory.

College Library

The campus has a central library housing around 11000 bound journals dating back to the 1960s. A newly built E-library offers access to electronic journals.

Hostels

Hostels are located on the main campus and are segregated by sex. There are separate hostels for undergraduate and postgraduate students.

== Affiliated hospitals ==
- Jawaharlal Nehru (Victoria) Hospital: The teaching hospital, originally called Victoria Hospital, was established during colonial times. The old building now houses the Ajmer Municipal Corporation. The first component of the future hospital was a dispensary, constructed in 1851. In 1895, construction of a general hospital was initiated to mark the Diamond Jubilee of Queen Victoria (1897 A.D.). In 1928, the hospital was moved to its present location and renamed New Victoria Hospital. In 1965 it was renamed Jawaharlal Nehru hospital. It now serves as the referral hospital of the Ajmer division of Rajasthan, which includes districts of Ajmer, Bhilwara, Nagaur, Tonk.
- Kamla Nehru Memorial TB Hospital: This houses the Chest & Respiratory division of the college, which treats the high numbers of TB patients in the region.
- Rajkiya Mahila Chikitsalya (Hospital): This houses the Obstetrics & Gynaecology department, which is concerned with maternal and perinatal specialty care. The building is located 7 km away from the main campus. It was founded as the ‘Panna Dhai Maternity Home’ in 1965 but due to lack of space was accommodated in the Longia Hospital (a city dispensary) from 1968 to 1974. It was restructured as a separate hospital and shifted to its current building in 1999.
- Satellite Hospital, Aadarsh Nagar.
- Post Graduate Institute Of Cardiology: This was the first government medical college in Rajasthan to start a dedicated cardiology division.

== Academics ==
=== Admissions ===
There are 250 seats approved by the Medical Council of India for MBBS degrees and 88 seats for postgraduate courses. Admissions are based upon highly competitive standardized premedical entrance examinations: NEET-UG for admission to MBBS and NEET-PG for admission to postgraduate courses.

=== Academic programmes ===
The MBBS degree takes four and a half years to complete, followed by a year of a Compulsory Rotating Medical Internship The school follows the semester system.

The MBBS degree certificate is awarded by the Rajasthan University of Health Sciences. Students are then given a registration certificate by the Rajasthan Medical Council and enrolled in the register of the National Medical Commission. They are then legally allowed to practice medicine in India .

Postgraduate studies are offered in various fields.

== See also ==
- Jawaharlal Nehru Medical College, Wardha, Maharashtra, India
- Jawaharlal Nehru Medical College, Aligarh, Uttar Pradesh, India
- Jawaharlal Nehru Medical College, Belgaum, Karnataka, India
- Rajasthan University of Health Sciences (RUHS), Jaipur
- Sawai Mansingh Medical College (SMS), Jaipur
- Dr. Sampoornanand Medical College, Jodhpur
- Sardar Patel Medical College, Bikaner
- Rabindranath Tagore Medical College, Udaipur
- Government Medical College, Kota
- Mayo College, Ajmer
