= COVID-19 pandemic in Rajasthan =

COVID-19 pandemic in Indian state

- Disease: COVID-19
- Pathogen: SARS-CoV-2
- Location: Rajasthan, India
- First outbreak: Wuhan, Hubei, China
- Index case: Jaipur
- Arrival date: 2 March 2020 (6 years, 6 months and 4 weeks)
- Confirmed cases: 953257 (15 July 2021)
- Active cases: 522 (15 July 2021)
- Recovered: 943788 (15 July 2021)
- Deaths: 8947 (15 July 2021)
- Fatality rate: 0.93 % (15 July 2021)
- Territories: All districts

Government website
- www.rajswasthya.nic.in

The first case of the COVID-19 pandemic in the Indian state of Rajasthan was reported on 2 March 2020 in Jaipur. The Rajasthan Health Department had confirmed a total of 29,835 cases, including 563 deaths and 21866 recoveries as of 20 July 2020. All districts in the state had reported confirmed cases of which, Jaipur was the worst-affected.

== Timeline ==
=== March ===
On 2 March 2020, an 69-year-old Italian tourist who was part of a group of 23 tourists from Italy tested positive for COVID-19. His initial test returned negative, but after deterioration of his condition, a second test was made which returned positive. Two days later, his wife also tested positive which worried the health authorities since the group had travelled to numerous tourist destinations. On 3 March, the Union Health Ministry held a meeting with officials of the Rajasthan Health Department over the outbreak. The Chief Minister of Rajasthan ordered the hotels where the Italian tourists resided to be sanitized. On 11 March, an 85-year-old man in Jaipur tested positive who had travel history to Dubai.

On 18 March, three people of a family tested positive for COVID-19 in Jhunjhunu which took the total cases to seven in the state. The three, a couple and their two-year-old daughter, had returned from Italy on 8 March. Immediately after confirmation, movement restrictions were enforced 1 km^{2} of their residence. The state imposed Section 144 across the entire state on 19 March. It also imposed a curfew around the family's residence and carried out surveillance to prevent forming of a positive cluster.

Three doctors of a private hospital along with six others tested positive in Bhilwara district on 20 March. 25 suspects were identified and kept in isolation. The government imposed a curfew on the whole district and sealed its borders. Door-to-door survey of around 80,000 houses in the Bhilwara city was initiated.

On 26 March, a 45-year-old man from Ramganj in Jaipur who had returned from Oman on 12 March, tested positive and emerged as a super spreader. Authorities said that he was asked to self quarantine, but instead he violated the given instructions and go on to meet other people. Ramganj was put under a curfew as it became a new hotspot in the state. Door-to-door screening was started. As of 16 April, 232 cases were traced back to the super spreader in Ramganj.

=== April ===
On April 3, the state recorded 46 cases, bringing the total cases to 179. It included nine evacuees from Iran and 33 Tablighi Jamaat participants. Bharatpur, Bikaner, Dausa and Dholpur districts reported their first cases due to the Tablighi Jamaat members.

On April 4, first death of the state was reported in Bikaner, as a 60-year-old woman died due to the virus. Till April 7, three died due to the virus.

By 10 April, of 27 positive cases found in Bhilwara, 25 patients had been cured of the infection and 15 were discharged from hospital. Between 3–10 April, only two new cases had been reported in the city. The containment strategy followed by the district administration referred as the "Bhilwara model" was praised nationwide for its effectiveness in containment of the virus.

On 13 April, 11 new coronavirus cases were reported, bringing the total tally to 815. Ten were in Bharatpur and one was in Banswara district of the state.

By 17 April, Tonk, Jodhpur, Jaisalmer, Kota, Jhalawar, Bharatpur, Banswara and Bikaner districts emerged as the new hotspots of the virus as these saw a surge in cases in April.

On 20 April, 98 cases were reported. 50 from Jaipur, 33 from Jodhpur, 7 from Kota, 3 from Nagaur, 2 from Jhunjhunu and 1 each from Tonk, Banswara and Ajmer .

On 21 April, 159 cases were reported: 72 from Jaipur, 35 from Ajmer, 16 from Jodhpur, 10 from Nagaur, 7 from Dausa, 5 each from Bhilwara and Hanumangarh, 2 each from Kota, Swai Madhopur, and Tonk, and 1 from Jhunjunu.

On 22 April, 153 cases and one death were reported, taking total cases to 1,888 and death toll to 27. 68 in Jaipur, 44 in Ajmer, 17 in Tonk, 11 in Jodhpur, 6 in Kota, 4 in Nagaur, and 1 each in Swai Moadhopur and Bharatpur were reported. Ajmer's Dargah area which is a densely populated area, had emerged as a new hotspot after reporting 79 cases in last two days, taking total infections to 103 in the district.

On 23 April, 76 cases and 1 death were reported.

On 24 April, 70 cases and 4 deaths were reported, taking total cases to 2,034 and death toll to 32.

On 25 April, 49 cases and two deaths were reported. 15 were reported from Jaipur, 10 from Jodhpur, 6 from Ajmer, 5 each from Kota and Jhalawar, 2 each from Bharatpur and Dholpur, and first case were reported in Rajsamand and Chittorgarh.

On 26 April, 102 cases and 7 deaths were reported. 38 tested positive in Jodhpur, 20 in Nagaur, 16 in Jaipur and 11 in Ajmer.

On 27 April, 77 cases and 9 deaths were reported. 11 tested positive in Jodhpur, 10 in Jhalawar, 8 in Tonk and 7 each in Kota and Chittorgarh.

On 28 April, 102 cases and 2 deaths were reported. 26 tested positive in Jaipur, 25 in Jodhpur, 24 in Kota, 11 in Ajmer and 8 in Tonk.

On 29 April, 74 cases and 3 deaths were reported. 22 tested positive in Jaipur, 13 in Jodhpur, 9 in Pali and 8 in Chittorgarh.

On 30 April, 146 cases and 3 deaths were reported. 97 tested positive in Jodhpur and 29 in Jaipur. First case in Baran was reported.

=== May ===
On 1 May, 82 cases and 4 deaths were reported. 35 tested positive in Jodhpur, 21 in Jaipur and rest in other districts.

On 2 May, 106 cases and 6 deaths were reported. 60 tested positive in Jodhpur and 33 in Jaipur and rest in other districts.

On 3 May, 114 cases and 3 deaths were reported. 40 from Chittorgarh, 32 from Jaipur and 27 from Jodhpur.

On 4 May, 175 cases and 6 deaths were reported. 89 tested positive in Jodhpur, 29 in Jaipur, and rest in other districts. In Chittorgarh's Nimbahera town over 100 people tested positive after first case from the town was reported on 25 April of a man with travel history to Indore, who was believed to be spreader of the infection. The area became an hotspot and a curfew was imposed.

On 5 May, 97 cases and 12 deaths were reported. 41 tested positive in Jodhpur, 25 in Jaipur, and remaining in other districts.

On 6 May, 159 cases and 4 deaths were reported and number of recoveries crossed the active cases in the state. 30 BSF Soldiers who returned from Delhi after COVID-19 management duty tested positive. 50 tested positive in Jodhpur, 43 in Jaipur and rest in other districts. Jalore reported its first 3 cases.

On 7 May, 110 cases and 6 deaths were reported. 30 tested positive in Jodhpur, 21 in Jaipur, and rest in other districts. Sirohi reported its first positive case, 12 more BSF personals tested positive in Jodhpur.

On 8 May, 152 cases were reported, 4 people died taking death toll to 103. 59 tested positive in Udaipur, 34 in Jaipur, and remaining in other districts.

On 9 May, 129 cases and 3 deaths were reported. 51 tested positive in Jaipur, 24 in Udaipur, and remaining in other districts.

On 10 May, 106 cases and two deaths were reported. 30 tested positive in Udaipur, 23 in Jaipur and remaining in other districts. Udaipur city was declared as a containment zone and emerged as a hotspot due to sudden rise in cases after a homeguard constable tested positive in Kanji ka Hatta area. A strict curfew was imposed in the city to restrict the movement of the people. In areas where clusters were reported, people were shifted to the quarantine facilities to prevent community transmission.

On 11 May, 174 cases and 5 deaths were reported. 49 tested positive in Udaipur, 28 in Jaipur, and remaining in other districts.

On 12 May, 138 cases and 4 deaths were reported. 42 tested positive in Udaipur, 34 in Jaipur and rest in other districts.

On 13 May, 202 cases and 4 deaths were reported. 61 were reported in Jaipur, 33 in Udaipur, and remaining in other districts. 1 more BSF soldier tested positive. An increase in number of infected people was observed as large number of migrants started returning from the severely hit states from COVID-19. So far, 177 migrants had tested positive in the state. As a result, all the migrants would have to go through 14 day compulsory quarantine according to the State Health minister Dr. Raghu Sharma.

On 14 May, 206 cases and 4 deaths were reported. Udaipur reported 59 cases, 36 in Jodhpur, and remaining in other districts. 267 migrants had tested positive to date.

On 15 May, 213 cases were reported. 48 in Kota, 38 in Udaipur, and remaining in other districts tested positive. 6 more BSF personnel tested positive. So far, 327 migrants who returned to the state were found infected.

On 16 May, 213 cases and one death were reported. Jaipur reported highest 131 cases in the state, as 119 inmates including Jail superintendent in Jaipur District Jail tested positive. Infection was believed to be spread through an inmate who was brought on 10 April to the jail and later he tested positive. All the infected patients were separated in a COVID care centre set up inside the jail.

On 17 May, 242 cases and 5 deaths were reported, which took state tally to 5202. 60 tested positive in Jaipur, 43 in Jodhpur, and remaining in other districts. According to State health minister, random sampling in jails were started to prevent spread of the COVID-19. The Rajasthan High Court directed state government to form committees in each district to check if guidelines to prevent the infection were followed in the jails.

On 18 May, 305 cases and 7 deaths were reported. Daily new cases continued to rise as the migrants from other states returned. 656 migrants had tested positive in last five days. Dungarpur district recorded 64 cases, highest in the state, 47 tested positive in Jaipur, and remaining in other districts.

On 19 May, 338 cases out of which 232 were migrants and 5 deaths were reported. Dungarpur reported highest cases for second day in a row with 87 cases, 77 cases were reported in Pali, and remaining in other districts.

On 20 May, 170 cases and 4 deaths were reported in the state. In a week, 990 migrants had tested positive in the state.

On 21 May, 212 cases and 4 deaths were reported in the state.

On 22 May, 267 cases and 2 deaths were reported in the state. 30 in Pali, 29 in Jaipur, and remaining in other districts. Half of the active cases in the state were migrants which accounts nearly 1300, as around 1 million migrants returned to the state in last 10 days.

On 23 May, 248 cases and 7 deaths were reported. Recovery rate of the state stood at 57% with 3786 recoveries. 26 tested positive in Jodhpur, 23 in Pali, and remaining in other districts.

On 24 May, 286 cases and 3 deaths were reported. 78 from Jaipur, 47 from Nagaur, and rest in other districts.

On 25 May, 272 cases and 4 deaths were reported. 50 from Pali, 48 from Nagaur, and remaining in other districts.

On 26 May, 236 cases and 3 deaths were reported. Till date, 2,011 migrants tested positive who returned from other states. 32 tested positive in Jaipur, 27 in Sirohi, and remaining in other districts.

On 27 May, 280 cases and 3 deaths were reported. Till date, 2,114 migrants tested positive after returning to the state. With Bundi reporting its first case, all the districts in the state got affected due to COVID-19. Jhalawar reported highest 68 cases, 42 from Jaipur, and remaining from other districts tested positive.

On 28 May, 251 cases and 7 deaths were reported. Jhalawar reported highest cases for consecutive second day with 69 cases, 64 from Jodhpur, and remaining from other districts tested positive. A total of 2,199 migrants had tested positive for the infection.

On 29 May, 298 cases and 4 deaths were reported in the state. 67 cases were from Jodhpur, 45 from Bharatpur, and remaining from other districts.

On 30 May, 252 cases and 9 deaths were reported. 41 cases were reported in Pali, 34 in Jodhpur, and remaining in other districts.

On 31 May, 214 cases and one death were reported. Jodhpur recorded highest of 54 cases in the state. 6,032 patients had recovered from the total tally of 8831.

In May, recovery rate of the state improved from 41.8% at the start of the month to 62.6% until 29 May, although as the migrants started arriving in the state and many of them tested positive for the infection, recovery rate in mid-of the month dipped for more than a week and again increased in the last week of the month.

=== June ===
On 1 June, 269 cases among which Jaipur reported highest 94 cases and five deaths of which three in Jaipur, and one each in Baran and Bikaner were recorded, with it state tally crossed 9000. Recovery rate stood at 67.2% and the fatality rate about 2.2%. 2,543 migrants had tested positive from starting of the May. Containment zones in Jaipur which have highest cases of around 22% of state's tally stood at 23.

On 2 June, 273 cases among which Bharatpur reported highest 70 cases and four deaths of which two in Jaipur and one each in Kota and Bharatpur were reported, with it death toll crossed 200 in the state. Doubling rate was observed to be 18 days against the national average of 12 days. 2,666 migrants had tested positive until now in the state.

On 3 June, 279 cases and six deaths were reported, four people died in Jaipur taking its death toll to 100 while one each died in Baran and Jodhpur. Bharatpur reported maximum of 88 cases, while 55 cases were reported in Jaipur and remaining cases in other districts of the state.

On 4 June, 210 cases and four deaths were reported, while total 7104 patients recovered out of 9862. Bharatpur reported maximum 49 cases in the state.

On 5 June, 222 cases and five deaths were reported, which took state total over 10,000. Jodhpur reported highest 52 cases in the state. A total of 7,359 people recovered from the disease.

On 6 June, 253 cases and 13 deaths were recorded, which were highest deaths in a day. Bharatpur reported highest 63 cases, Jodhpur reported 56 cases and remaining were from other districts.

On 7 June, a total of 262 cases were reported in state with 9 fatalities. The highest cases 81 was reported from Jodhpur, followed by Bharatpur 63 and Jaipur 38 and rest in other districts.

On 8 June, 272 cases were reported with six deaths in the state. Alwar reported highest 67 cases, while 60 from Bharatpur and rest in other districts.

On 9 June, highest spike in a day with 369 cases were reported while nine died due to the disease. 100 cases were from Jaipur, 65 from Jodhpur and remaining from the other districts.

On 12 June, Bharatpur had highest 573 active cases in the state and had 80 containment zones of a 3 km area, as the daily new cases continued to rise in the district. According to officials, rise was due to 160 migrants testing positive as well as the vegetable traders in Kumher Gate wholesale mandi were infected from the virus, who frequently visited Agra as the district have border with Uttar Pradesh. Section 144 of CrPC was imposed, banning gathering of more than 4 people and intense contact tracing was initiated.

== Government response ==
On 19 March, Section 144 which restricted gathering of five or more was imposed in Rajasthan to contain the spread of the disease. The government had also screened all passengers reaching Jaipur via foreign flights and kept the ones showing symptoms in home isolation for 14 days.

The state was the first to announce complete lockdown starting 22 March, barring essential services. On 22 March, it banned public transport services in the state. On 24 March, the state banned all private vehicles in the roads after COVID-19 cases crossed 32 in the state. The state government had also announced free ration for two months for families covered under the National Food Security Act (NFSA).

On 11 April, the state government announced financial assistance of ₹50 lakhs to the family of government employees who die due to disease during anti-COVID-19 operations.

On 1 May, Districts of the state were divided in three zones by Union Health Ministry based on severity of the outbreak, Rajasthan have 8 red zones, 19 orange zones and 6 green zones. The relaxations in the extended lockdown in these zones will be provided accordingly.

On 7 May, CM Ashok Gehlot sealed the state borders to prevent the entry of unauthorised personals as the cases suddenly increased across the country and said that only individuals mentioned according to the MHA guidelines were permitted.

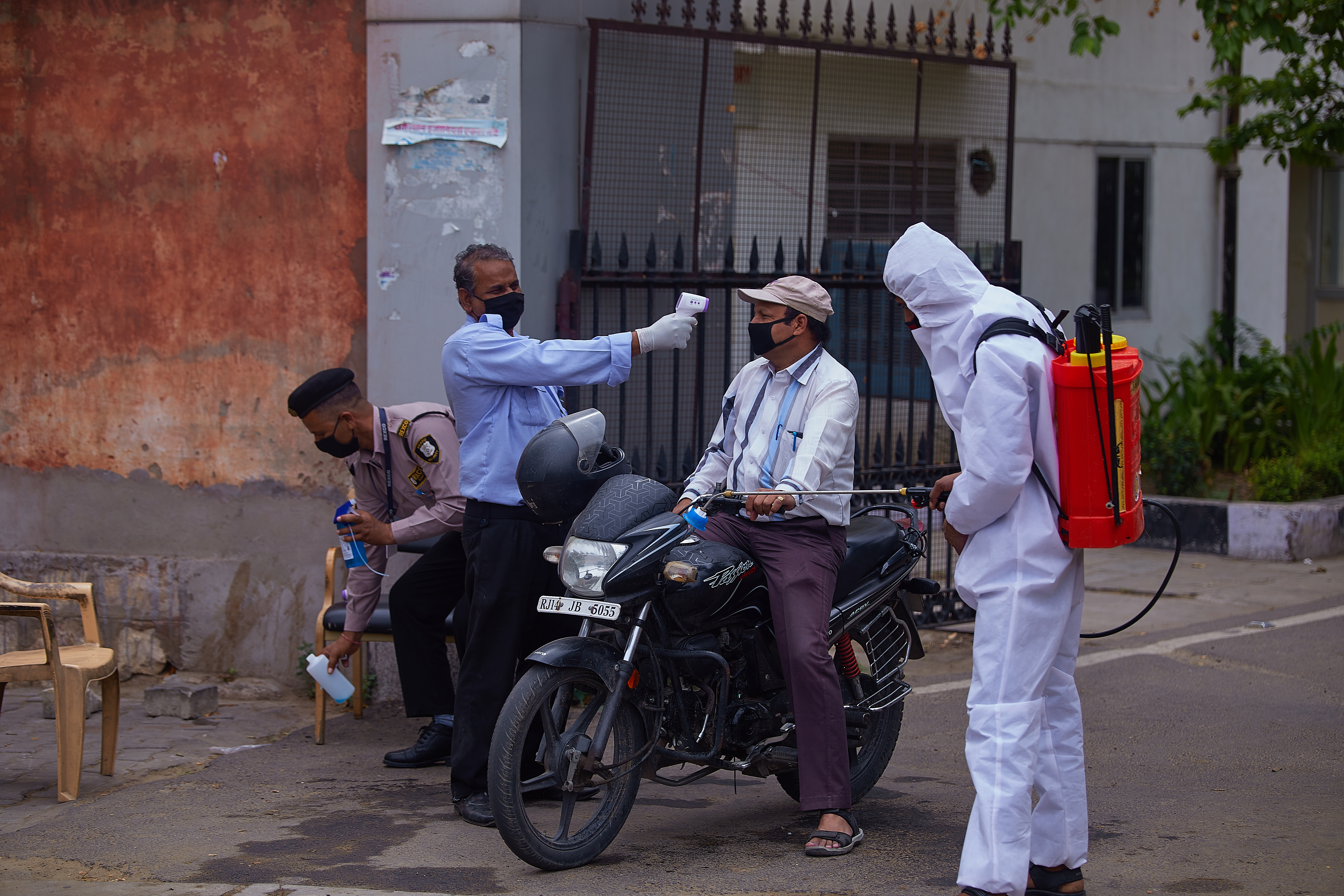
Bike rider undergoes Thermal screening and sanitisation in Jaipur

On 18 May, Rajasthan government issued guidelines and relaxations regarding lockdown 4.0 in the state and classified the zones under Urban and Panchayat samiti categories in each district. Movement of individuals were restricted from 7 pm to 7 am for non essential activities. All shops except those in containment zones and in malls were allowed to open, with conditions of social distancing and only two to five customers allowed at a time. Except in containment zones, barber shops, salons and parlors were allowed to open with safety precautions to be followed. Restaurants, sweet shops and eateries were allowed to open but only for home deliveries and takeaways. No commercial transport were allowed in red zones while taxis, cabs and autorickshaws with driver and two riders and intercity bus services were allowed in orange zones. Except restricted activities, all other activities were permitted in green zones. In red zones, 50 percent staff were allowed to work in the government and private offices while in orange zones two-thirds of the staff were permitted.

On 31 May, the lockdown was extended until 30 June with few more relaxations except in the containment zones. The tourist places were allowed to open from 1 June. The hotels, restaurants, malls were permitted to open from 8 June under the guidelines of central government, but religious places and educational institutions continued to be remained closed.

On 10 June, Government of Rajasthan said that state borders will be sealed due to rise in COVID-19 cases in the state. Later, the order was amended and said that inter-state movement would be regulated for a week and people were needed to get permit from officials for entering or leaving the state. On 16 June, the state government said that no passes or NOC would be required to enter or leave the state from now on. In a subsequent manner, several restrictions were eased. In November, the increasing cases amid festive season and cold weather conditions prompted the government to impose night curfew in selected cities and urban areas.

The educational institutions were allowed to open from 18 January 2021 with necessary guidelines. On 18 January 2021, the night curfew was withdrawn in view of significant reduction in coronavirus cases and few more relaxations were given.

In view of gradual increase in cases in February, negative RT-PCR report was made mandatory for travellers from Maharashtra and Kerala.

On March 21, decision was taken to impose night curfew in 8 cities from 11pm to 5am and a negative RT-PCR was made mandatory for people entering the state. A state-wide curfew was imposed on April 19 until 3 May to limit the spread of the disease in view of the second wave of COVID-19.

Meanwhile, with the increase in Mucormycosis (black fungus) in COVID recovered patients, it was declared as an epidemic and notifiable disease in the state on 19 May.

=== Legal action ===
As of 26 May, during the lockdown, ₹81.25 lakh (US$84,000) were collected as fine from 40,083 violators, more than 136,000 vehicles were seized and ₹6.88 crore (US$710,000) were collected as fine from the owners. Fines were imposed on 24,067 people for not wearing masks in the public places, 11,872 people for not following social distancing guidelines and 3755 shopkeepers for defying lockdown to sell goods. 445 people were arrested for attacking the frontline health workers. On 2 November, Rajasthan became the first state to pass a bill, which made mandatory for people to wear mask in public and private gatherings.

== Testing ==
Summary of test results
Samples collected	757,137
Tested Positive	225,817
Tests per million	9,799
Percentage Tested Positive	29.8%
As of 25 June 2020

Rajasthan was among the states of the country which have conducted highest number of tests and have per capita ratio of tests higher than national average. The State government had also planned to further step up its testing capacity to 10,000 tests per day. 7 out of 14 government medical colleges and AIIMS Jodhpur were conducting RT-PCR testing across the state, with only Sawai Man Singh Hospital having an automatic nuclear extraction machine. Government had ordered PCR machines for all 33 districts and automatic RNA extraction machines for remaining seven medical colleges.

On 18 April, the state government was the first to start rapid testing for COVID-19 through rapid testing kits on 17 April. It gives instant results based on presence of antibodies in blood, which helps in quickly isolating the suspected person. On 21 April, the state government stopped using rapid testing kits as they were giving low accuracy of 5.4% in compared to expected 90% accuracy. Later, ICMR advised all states to stop using rapid testing kits for next two days until their on-ground teams validates these kits.

On 29 April, State Health Minister Dr. Raghu Sharma said that 8 CB-NAAT machines used for detecting tuberculosis, were being transferred to government medical colleges in Jaipur, Jodhpur, Bikaner and Kota to increase the testing rates, as ICMR had permitted use of diagnostic machines which tests drug-resistant tuberculosis.

On 31 May, CM Ashok Gehlot said that the state had achieved the testing rate of 16,000 samples per day and testing labs would be set up in all 33 districts of the state to increase the capacity to 25,000 tests per day.

=== Testing statistics ===
Tested Samples

New tests per day

Daily positive sampling ratio
since 28 March

Source: Rajswasthya.nic.in

== Treatment ==
In Rajasthan, a combination of anti-malaria, anti-Swine flu and anti-HIV drugs resulted into recovery of three patients in March.

Government of Rajasthan had sought permission from Indian Council for Medical Research (ICMR) for the clinical trials of the convalescent plasma therapy for treatment of severely ill patients at Sawai Man Singh Hospital (SMS Hospital) in Jaipur, as several states across the country had started its clinical trials and shown encouraging results, which ICMR approved. Rajasthan became the fourth state in the country to successfully perform clinical trials of convalescent plasma therapy as SMS Medical college and Hospital treated two COVID-19 patients. ICMR further listed SMS Medical college and Hospital for trial on 20 more patients. Rajasthan government got approval from ICMR for the clinical trials at Government Medical College Jodhpur to treat COVID-19 patients from plasma therapy, with this two government hospitals and one private hospital could treat patients from plasma therapy in the state.

== Statistics ==
=== Cumulative confirmed cases, active cases, recoveries and deaths ===
Total confirmed cases Active Cases Recoveries Deaths

=== Daily Data ===
==== Active cases ====
No. of active cases

==== Daily new cases ====
New cases per day

==== Daily new recoveries ====
New recoveries per day

==== Daily new deaths ====
New deaths per day

==== Case fatality rate ====
The trend of case fatality rate for COVID-19 from 4 April, the day first death in the state was recorded.

Case fatality rate

Graph source: Data from Department of Medical, Health and Family Welfare, Government of Rajasthan

== See also ==
- COVID-19 pandemic in India
