= S. S. Agarwal =

Indian physician

S S Agarwal
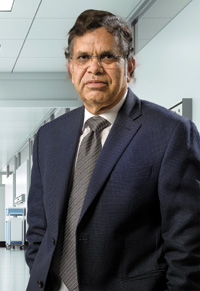
- Born: Jaipur, Rajasthan, India
- Education: SMS Medical College, Jaipur
- Occupations: Chairman, Swasthya Kalyan Group; Chairman, Rajasthan Hospitals; Member, Ethics Committee, Medical Council of India; President, AIIMS Jodhpur
- Spouse: Mala Agarwal
- Children: Ashu Agarwal; Tashi Agarwal; Sarvesh Agarwal

S. S. Agarwal is a physician and former national president of the Indian Medical Association. He is also the current President of All India Institute of Medical Sciences, Jodhpur, starting his tenure from August 2023.

== Early life and education ==
He was born to Lt. Shri Kalyan Prasad Sootwale and Smt. Reshmi devi Agarwal in Jaipur in Rajasthan in a family of thread traders known by the name of "sootwalas". Agarwal studied medicine from the Sawai Man Singh Medical College, Jaipur where he pursued his MBBS & MD Medicine education.

In 1982, he established his own hospital “Swasthya Kalyan” in Jaipur.

== Indian Medical Association ==
In September, 2014, Agarwal was elected as the president of the Indian Medical Association.
