= 2008 vote of confidence in the Manmohan Singh ministry =

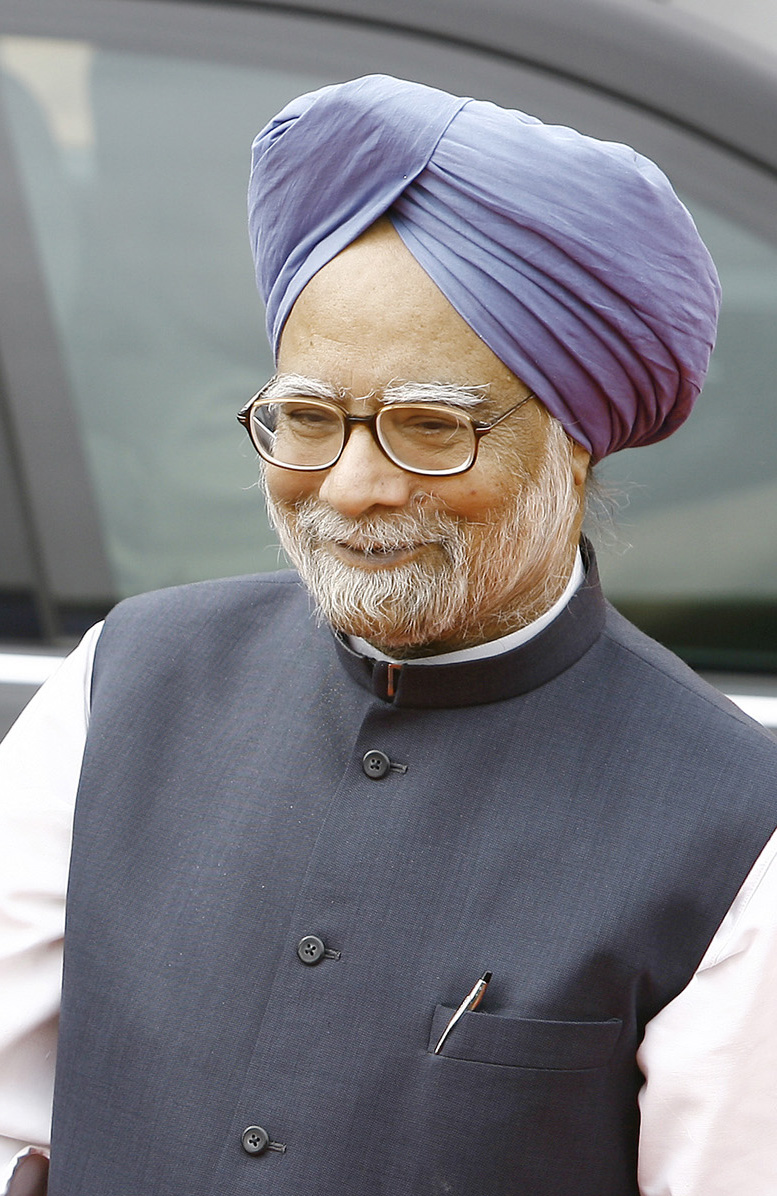
Prime Minister Manmohan Singh

The United Progressive Alliance (UPA), the governing alliance in India elected in 2004, faced its first confidence vote in the Lok Sabha (the lower house of Parliament) on 22 July 2008 after the Communist Party of India (Marxist)-led Left Front withdrew support over India approaching the IAEA for the Indo-US nuclear deal. The vote was so crucial that the UPA and the opposition parties summoned MPs from their sick beds and even from prison cells to take part in the vote, which was eventually won by the Government.

== Before the vote ==
The following list indicates the official position of the political parties before the voting.

Votes for the Government	Votes against the Government	Undecided
United Progressive Alliance (226): Indian National Congress (153); Rashtriya Janata Dal (24); Dravida Munnetra Kazhagam (16); Nationalist Congress Party (11); Pattali Makkal Katchi (6); Jharkhand Mukti Morcha (5); Lok Jan Shakti Party (4); Marumalarchi Dravida Munnetra Kazhagam (Breakaway) (2); All India Majlis-e-Ittehadul Muslimeen (1); People's Democratic Party (1); Republican Party of India (1); Sikkim Democratic Front (1); Indian Union Muslim League (1); Others (42): Samajwadi Party (37); Independent (3); Bharatiya Navshakti Party (1); National Loktantrik Party (1)	National Democratic Alliance (169): Bharatiya Janata Party (130); Shiv Sena (12); Biju Janata Dal (11); Janata Dal (United) (8); Shiromani Akali Dal (8); Left Front (59): Communist Party of India (Marxist) (43); Communist Party of India (10); All India Forward Bloc (3); Revolutionary Socialist Party (3); Left-Backed MPs (3): Kerala Congress (2); Janata Dal (Secular) (1); Independent (1); UNPA (8): Telugu Desam Party (5); Asom Gana Parishad (2); Independent (1); Others (24): Bahujan Samaj Party (17); Samajwadi Party (Breakaway) (2); Marumalarchi Dravida Munnetra Kazhagam (2); Telangana Rashtra Samithi (3)	Undecided (11): Mizo National Front (1); Nagaland People's Front (1); All India Trinamool Congress (1); Rashtriya Lok Dal (3); Janata Dal (Secular) (2); Independent (1); Jammu & Kashmir National Conference (2)

UPA and supporters: 268 MPs for the government
NDA and others: 263 MPs against the government
Undecided: 11 MPs
Non-voting: 1 MP

== Voting ==
In the 543 member Lok Sabha, the UPA needed 272 votes for the government to enjoy a simple majority. The UPA won the confidence vote with 275 votes to the opposition's 256, (10 members abstained from the vote) to record a 19-vote victory.

== Abstentions ==
Ten members abstained from the voting despite some of them having received strict contrary instructions from their parties. Among the 10, 2 MPs followed their party decision of abstaining so as to not be seen as supporting the UPA or the BJP, Left led opposition. Those two were:

- Trinamool Congress: Mamata Banerjee and
- Mizo National Front: Vanlalzawma.

The other eight members who abstained defied their party stand. These eight were:

- Bharatiya Janata Party: Brij Bhushan Sharan Singh, Chandrabhan Singh, Manorama Madhavaraj, Kishan Lal Diler and Bahubhai Katara
- Shiromani Akali Dal: Sukhdev Singh Libra
- Janata Dal (United): P.P. Koya
- Shiv Sena: Tukaram Ganpatrao Renge Patil
- Telugu Desam Party: D K Audikesavulu

== Cross voting ==
The seven members of the UPA who cross-voted against the government were:

- Samajwadi Party: Chaudhary Munawwar Hasan, S.P. Singh Baghel, Rajnarayan Budholiya, Jaiprakash Rawat, Atiq Ahmed and Afzal Ansari.
- Indian National Congress: Kuldeep Bishnoi

Conversely, there were at least four members of the opposition who cross-voted in favour of the government proposal. These 4 were

- Bharatiya Janata Party: Harising Nasaru Rathod and H.T. Sangliana.
- Biju Janata Dal: Hari Har Swain
- Janata Dal (United): Ramswaroop Prasad

== Allegations of bribery ==
Three BJP MPs – Ashok Argal (Morena), Faggan Singh Kulaste (Mandla) and Mahavir Bhagora (Salumber) amidst discussion walked towards the Speaker Somnath Chatterjee and placed two brown and black leather bags on a table. They pulled out bundles of ₹1,000 (US$10) and alleged that Samajwadi Party leader Amar Singh had tried to offer them bribe to vote in favour of the government. The BJP MP Kulaste, alleged that Amar Singh and Congress leader Ahmed Patel, an aide to Sonia Gandhi tried to offer bribe of ₹90 million (US$930,000) to remain absent from the confidence vote. Amar Singh denied the charges. Speaker Somnath Chatterjee asked the police chief of New Delhi to investigate the bribery issue. Indian news channel CNN IBN which carried out the sting operation by recording using hidden cameras agreed to share the material with Indian authorities. A joint parliamentary committee formed to investigate the issue submitted its report to the Lok Sabha on 15 December 2008, after finding no evidence for bribery against the MPs Amar Singh and Ahmad Patel, thereby exonerating them. In March 2011, a parliamentary panel recommended a formal investigation into the bribery allegations, following renewed scrutiny of the cash-for-votes scandal by opposition parties and media.

== Expulsions ==
As a result of not obeying the instructions issued by their political parties, many MPs were expelled as an aftermath of the vote.

- The speaker of the house, Somnath Chatterjee of the Communist Party of India (Marxist) was expelled from his party on 23 July 2008.
- The Bhartiya Janata Party expelled all its eight members who defied party guidelines by cross voting and abstentions during the vote of confidence. The leader of the party L. K. Advani also said that 22 July should go down as a black day in parliament history.
- The Telugu Desam Party has reported that disciplinary action against two of its MPs, D. K. Adikesavulu Naidu and M. Jagannadham, would be taken as they voted in support of UPA government, though there were reports of abstention by Adikeshavalu Naidu.
- The Biju Janata Dal expelled its MP, Harihara Swain for voting in favour of government.
- The Shiromani Akali Dal has asked for an explanation from its MP who abstained from voting.

== Animal sacrifice ==
- It was reported that the Samajwadi Party MLA from Lanji Kishore Samrite sacrificed 319 animals – 302 goats, 17 buffaloes – in a 10-day-long yajna at Guwahati's Kamakhya temple for appeasing the Goddess Kamakhya in order for UPA to win the trust vote. Samrite also offered another 'yajna' at Ugratara temple in the city and sacrificed two buffalos there. He spent about 17 lakh on the yajna, and self-confessed to have done it before several times, in distress.

== External links to speeches ==
- Dr. Manmohan Singh's speech
- P.Chidambaram's speech
