= Ashok Panagariya =

Indian neurologist, medical researcher, and academic (1950–2021)

- Born: 22 August 1950; Suwana Bhilwara, Rajasthan, India
- Died: 11 June 2021 (aged 70); Jaipur
- Education: Sawai Man Singh Medical College; Postgraduate Institute of Medical Education and Research
- Occupations: Neurologist; medical researcher and academic
- Known for: Neuromyotonia research, medical education, public health
- Spouse: Meena Panagariya
- Children: Arihant Panagariya, Aditi Tandon, Arushi Jain
- Relatives: Arvind Panagariya (brother)
- Awards: Padma Shri; Dr. B. C. Roy Award; UNESCO Award; Government of Rajasthan Merit Award; Times of India Lifetime Achievement Award

Ashok Panagariya (22 August 1950 – 11 June 2021) was an Indian neurologist, medical researcher and academician, known for his research on nerve cells and neuromyotonia. He was a Vice Chancellor of Rajasthan University of Health Sciences, Jaipur and a member of the Planning Board of the Government of Rajasthan. He was a recipient of the Dr. B. C. Roy Award, the highest Indian award in the medical category. Ashok Panagariya was awarded the fourth highest Indian civilian award of Padma Shri by the Government of India in 2014. He died on 11 June 2021 due to COVID-19 complications.

== Early life and education ==
Ashok Panagariya was born on 22 August 1950 in Suwana Bhilwara, in the Indian state of Rajasthan, in a family of freedom fighters. His father Balu Lal Panagariya was a civil servant in the govt of Rajasthan. He obtained his MBBS in the year 1972 and completed post-graduate training in Internal Medicine in 1976 at the Sawai Man Singh Medical College; he then obtained his DM in Neurology at PGI Chandigarh and became a fellow of the Royal College of Physicians.

== Career ==
He headed the department of neurology at the SMS Medical College and became the Principal of the institution. He also served as Vice Chancellor of Rajasthan University of Health Sciences, as the president of Indian Academy of Neurology 2010–2011 and was a member of the State Planning Board on Health.

Panagariya was a professor emeritus of the SMS Medical College and an honorary neurologist to the Armed Forces of India. He was the chairman of DISHA Foundation, a non-profit non-governmental organization engaged in the welfare of people with special needs. He was also associated with the Post Graduate Institute of Medical Education and Research, Chandigarh and the Press Club of Jaipur, as a member.

== Publications ==
Panagariya had more than ninety publications in peer reviewed journals and contributed to a textbook on neurology by Walter George Bradley. He also wrote on health issues and the science of spiritualism.

== Awards and recognition ==
Panagariya received the Merit award from the Government of Rajasthan in 1992. The Medical Council of India awarded him the Dr. B. C. Roy Award, the highest Indian award in the medical category, in 2002. He was awarded the civilian honour of Padma Shri in 2014 by the Government of India.

He was a recipient of the UNESCO Award for medical/social contributions, the Lifetime Achievement Award from The Times of India and of the Lifetime Achievement Award of Madras Neuro Trust.

== Legacy ==
In 2022, the Indian Academy of Neurology (IAN) established the Dr. Ashok Panagariya Research Scholar Award, an annual award in memory of Panagariya. This award, presented by the IAN, is granted to neurologists under the age of 40 and includes a ₹1 lakh cash prize.
