= Maya Tandon =

Indian anesthesiologist and social activist

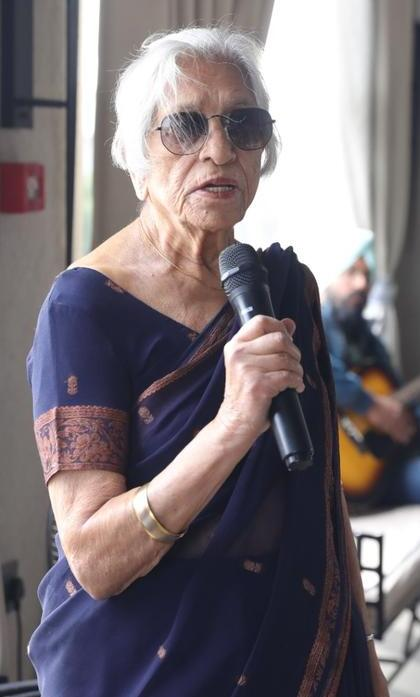
- Tandon in 2024
- Born: 1936 (age 89–90); Ajmer, India
- Education: Sawai Man Singh Medical College
- Known for: Road safety activism, CPR training
- Awards: Padma Shri (2024)

Maya Tandon (born 1936) is an Indian anesthesiologist and road safety activist from Rajasthan. She's awarded Padma Shri, the fourth highest Indian civilian honour, for her extensive work in road safety awareness and training.

== Early life and education ==
Tandon completed her schooling from Sophia School in Ajmer and later studied at Sawai Man Singh Medical College in Jaipur.

== Career and activism ==
Tandon is a retired Superintendent of JK Lawn Hospital in Jaipur.

Following her retirement as an anesthesiologist, she dedicated over 30 years to promoting road safety awareness through her organisation, "Sahayata Trust." Her work has focused on providing free training to over 100,000 individuals in road safety, CPR, accident response, and emergency protocols. She has also been a former member of the National Road Safety Council. Her efforts are particularly focused on minimising mortality rates caused by Road Traffic Accidents (RTAs) through widespread public education on life-saving techniques.

In 2024, she was awarded Padma Shri, the fourth highest Indian civilian honour for her social work.

== Personal life ==
Tandon met her husband while doing an internship in Ajmer, and they married and moved to Jaipur. In 1968, she gave birth to their son.
