= India: The Emerging Giant =

- Author: Arvind Panagariya
- Subject: Economy of India
- Publisher: Oxford University Press
- Publication date: 2008
- Publication place: United States
- Pages: 514
- ISBN: 978-0-19-531503-5
- LC Class: HC435.3P36 2007

India: The Emerging Giant is a 2008 book by Arvind Panagariya which describes the contemporary state of the economy of India.

== Synopsis by chapter ==
Each chapter has a main topic and a set of essays on different aspects of that main topic.

=== Growth and Economic Reforms ===
==== Distinguishing Four Phases ====
This chapter is divided into these parts:

- Phase I (1951–65): Takeoff under a Liberal Regime
- Phase II (1965–81): Socialism Strikes with a Vengeance
- Phase III (1981–88): Liberalization by Stealth
- Phase IV (1988–2006): Triumph of Liberalization
- A Tale of two Countries:India and the Republic of Korea

==== Poverty, Inequality, and Economic Reforms ====
This chapter is divided into these parts:

- Declining Poverty: The Human Face of Reforms
- Inequality: A Lesser Problem

==== Macroeconomics ====
This chapter is divided into these parts:

- Deficits and Debt: Is a Crisis around the Corner?
- The External Sector: On the Road to Capital Account Convertibility?
- The Financial Sector: Why Not Privatize the Banks?

==== Transforming India ====
This chapter is divided into these parts:

- International Trade: Carrying Liberalization Forward
- Industry and Services: Walking on Two Legs
- Modernizing Agriculture

==== The Government ====
This chapter is divided into these parts:

- Tax Reform: Toward a Uniform Goods and Services Tax
- Tackling Subsidies and Reforming the Civil Service
- Telecommunications and Electricity: Contrasting Experiences
- Transportation: A Solvable Problem
- Health and Water Supply and Sanitation: Can the Government Deliver?
- Education: Expenditures or Transfers?

== Reviews ==
Nandan Nilekani said that in this book the author has "so convincingly argued (that) open policies and rapid economic growth are the best antidotes for poverty reduction."

The review in Foreign Affairs said, "This is a massive research study that will command the respect of scholars who like to pore over tables, graphs, and charts in search of patterns and connections in the data."

Economist Sally Razeen said that by this book, "Arvind Panagariya has written probably the best all-around, up-to-date, and accessible book on the Indian economy."
