= Anita Bhandari =

Indian surgeon

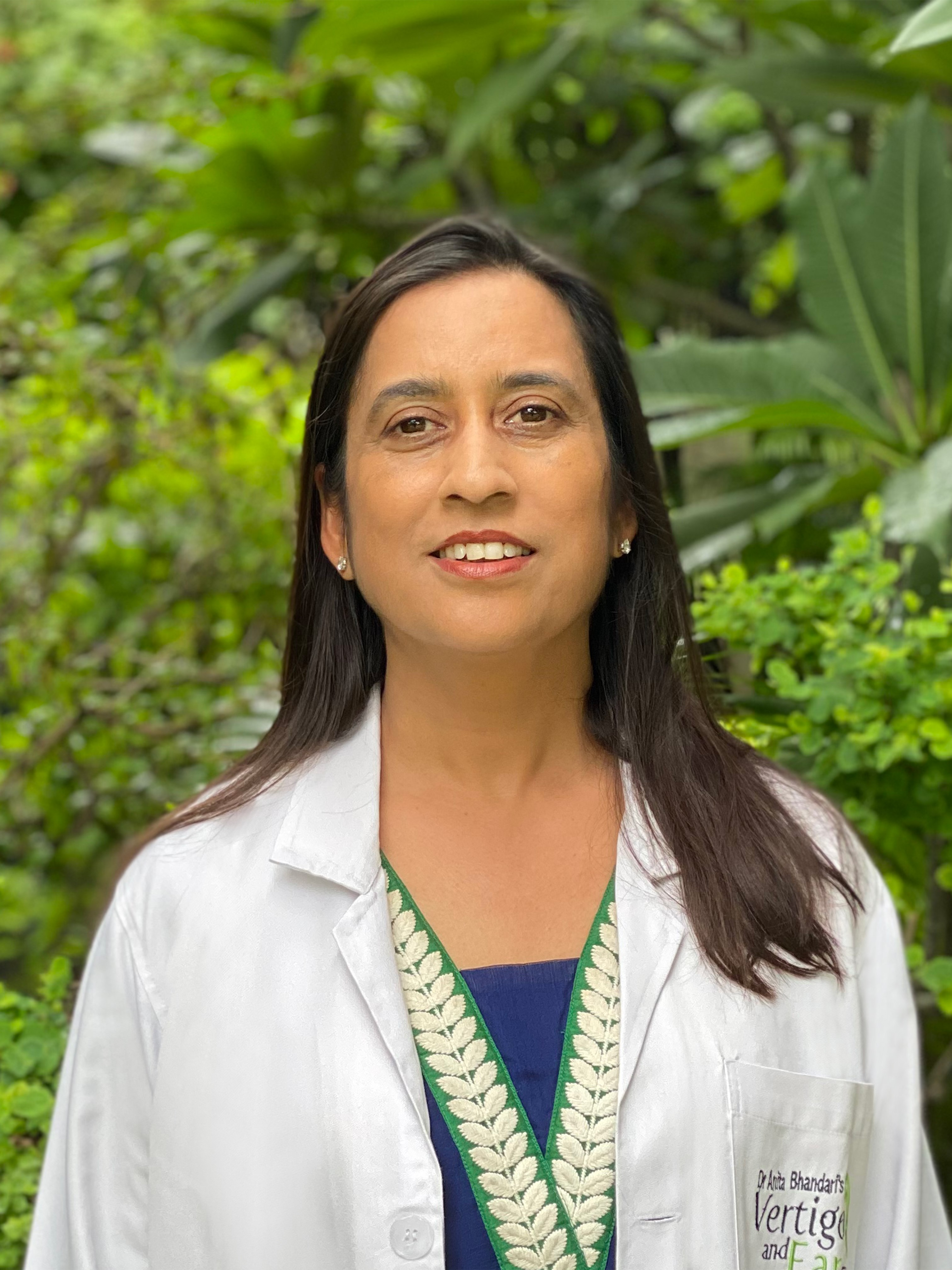
- Occupations: ENT Surgeon, Neurotologist

Anita Bhandari is an Indian neurotologist, otorhinolaryngologist, entrepreneur and author based in Jaipur. She is the co-founder and director of NeuroEquilibrium, which has set up over 175 dizziness and balance disorder clinics in India and abroad.

== Education and career ==
Bhandari completed her M.S. (ENT) from SMS Medical College, Jaipur. She was awarded a PHD by the Faculty of Health, Medicine and Life Sciences of Maastricht University, Netherlands. Bhandari worked as an assistant professor at SMS Medical College from 1997 to 2006.

In 2016, Anita and Rajneesh Bhandari started NeuroEquilibrium, a chain of vertigo, dizziness, and balance disorder clinics. In 2019, they also founded FutureCure Health.

Bhandari is the founder of Vertigo and Ear Clinic, Jaipur, a laboratory for the evaluation and treatment of vertigo, dizziness, and balance disorders. She conducts training programs for vestibular evaluation and management of vestibular disorders for clinicians in India as well as worldwide.

Bhandari was an invited speaker at the following events: Vertigo Academy International Conference, Serbia 2023, IFOS Dubai 2023, Barany Society Meeting Madrid 2022, and CIGICON New Delhi 2022. She delivered the 330th Dr. Luis Maria Alvarez Guerrero Memorial Lecture at the University of Santo Tomas (Faculty of Medicine & Surgery), Manila, Philippines. She is also a TEDx speaker.

== Publications ==
Bhandari is the author of an e-book on BPPV, "Benign Paroxysmal Positional Vertigo", published in 2020. She has also authored chapters in various Neurotology textbooks.

Her other publications include:

- Large Variability of Head Angulation During the Epley Maneuver: Use of a Head-Mounted Guidance System with Visual Feedback to Improve Outcomes, 2023, Bhandari A, Bhandari R., Herman K., Raymond van de Berg 3, DOI: 10.5152/iao.2023.22969
- Modified Interpretations of the Supine Roll Test in Horizontal Canal BPPV Based on Simulations: How the Initial Position of the Debris in the Canal and the Sequence of Testing Affects the Direction of the Nystagmus and the Diagnosis, 2022, Bhandari A., Bhandari R., Kingma H, Strupp M., doi: 10.3389/fneur.2022.881156
- BPPV Simulation: A Powerful Tool to Understand and Optimize the Diagnostics and Treatment of all Possible Variants of BPPV, Bhandari A, Kingma H, Bhandari R., 2021, Vol-12
- Three-dimensional simulations of six treatment maneuvers for horizontal canal benign paroxysmal positional vertigo canalithiasis, Bhandari A, Bhandari R, Kingma H, Zuma E, Maia F, Strupp M., 2021, DOI: 10.1111/ene.15044
- Diagnostic and Therapeutic Maneuvers for Anterior Canal BPPV Canalithiasis: Three-Dimensional Simulations, 2021, Bhandari A, Herman K., Michael S., DOI:10.3389/fneur.2021.740599
- Differential Diagnosis of Vertigo in Children- Indian Society of Otology, 2019, Bhandari A, Arpana Goswami, DOI: 10.1055/s-0039-1693105
- Early Intratympanic Methylprednisolone in Sudden SNHL: A Frequency-wise Analysis, 2019, A. Bhandari, Satish Jain
