= Arvind Panagariya =

Indian-American economist

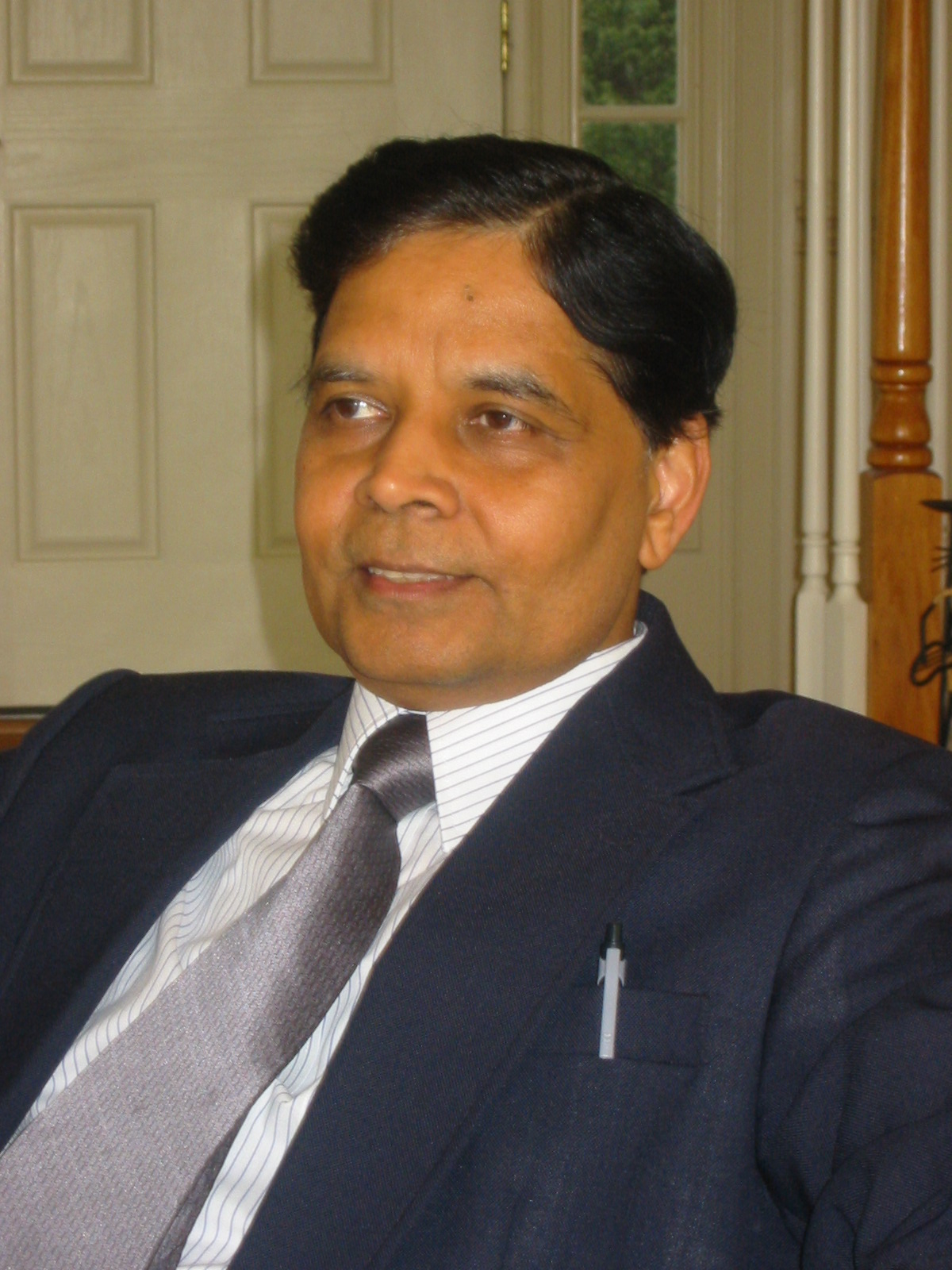

Chancellor of Nalanda University
- Incumbent
- Assumed office 30 April 2023
- Preceded by: Vijay Pandurang Bhatkar

Chairman of 16th Finance Commission of India
- In office 2023–2028
- Preceded by: N. K. Singh

1st Vice Chairman of NITI Aayog
- In office 5 January 2015 – 31 August 2017
- Preceded by: Position established
- Succeeded by: Rajiv Kumar

Personal details
- Born: 30 September 1952 (age 74) Bhilwara, Rajasthan, India
- Citizenship: Indian
- Relatives: Ashok Panagariya (brother)
- Education: Rajasthan University (B.A., M.A.); Princeton University (Ph.D.)
- Profession: Economist
- Awards: Padma Bhushan

Arvind Panagariya (born 30 September 1952) is an Indian economist who served as the first vice-chairman of the government of India think-tank NITI Aayog from January 2015 to August 2017. He has been appointed as the chairman of 16th Finance Commission by the government of India. He is a former Chief Economist of the Asian Development Bank. He was awarded the Padma Bhushan by the President of India in 2012 for his contributions in the field of economics and Public Policy.

He is currently the Chancellor of the modern Nalanda University at Rajgir, Bihar; established as a successor to the historic Nalanda University by the Nalanda University Act, 2010. He has published widely on free trade as well as on the development of the Indian economy. He is the brother of noted neurologist and medical researcher Dr. Ashok Panagariya.

== Education ==
He holds a Ph.D. in economics from Princeton University under the doctoral supervision of Peter Kenen and William Hoban Branson.

He was the Professor of economics and co-director of Center for International Economic at the University of Maryland at College Park from 1978 to 2003. He currently serves as the Jagdish Bhagwati Professor of Indian Political Economy at Columbia University and is also the Director of Deepak and Neera Raj Center on Indian Economic Policies at School of International and Public Affairs at Columbia University in New York City.

== Career ==
He was previously Chief Economist at the Asian Development Bank. He has worked for the World Bank, International Monetary Fund, World Trade Organization and the United Nations Conference on Trade and Development (UNCTAD).He served as an Adviser to the Board of US-India Strategic Partnership Forum (USISPF).

He was a Non-resident Senior Fellow, Brookings Institution, Washington DC. He was a member of an Independent Taskforce on South Asia and India sponsored by Centre for Foreign Relations, New York.

He has served as a member of International Advisory Board, Securities and Exchange Board of India(SEBI). He served as a Member of Board of Governors of Indian Council for Research on International Economic Relations (ICRIER). He was also a member of Committee on the Center on Advanced Financial Research and Learning (CAFRL) appointed by the Governor, Reserve bank of India (RBI).

His book Why Growth Matters, co-authored with Jagdish Bhagwati, won the coveted Eccles Prize for Excellence in Economic Writing and was listed as the best book of the year by the Financial Times. The Economist described this book as “a manifesto for policymakers and analysts.” His other works include India: The Emerging Giant, published in 2008. It was described as the ‘definitive book on the Indian economy’ by Fareed Zakaria. He frequently collaborates and co authors research papers and books with noted economist Dr. Jagdish Bhagwati.

He was the founding editor of the journal India Policy Forum, launched in 2004 by the Brookings Institution and the National Council of Applied Economic Research (NCAER).

He is also the founding editor of the Journal of Policy Reform, which he edited with Dani Rodrik during 1996–2001. He is currently an associate editor of Economics and Politics and the Journal of International Trade and Economic Development.

Papers written by him for the World Bank and IMF usually promote the idea of trade liberalisation and privatization of state owned enterprises of India for an investment and exports driven economic growth.

He has appeared on Bloomberg TV India for the show "Transforming India With Arvind Panagriya" He writes a monthly column in the Times of India and his guest columns appear in the Financial Times, Wall Street Journal and India Today.

He was awarded the Padma Bhushan by the President of India in 2012 for his contributions in the field of economics and Public Policy.

On 5 January 2015, he was appointed vice-chairman of the National Institution for Transforming India (NITI) Aayog, the replacement for the Planning Commission. He was appointed as India's Sherpa for G20 talks in September 2015. Panagariya was also heading analysis of the data of the Socio Economic and Caste Census 2011.

He gave his resignation as Niti Aayog Vice-chairman stating that Columbia University has not extended his leave beyond 31 August 2017. PM Modi termed his contributions to the policy making as 'miraculous'.

== Personal life ==
He was born in 1952 as a son of Baloo Lal Panagariya, who migrated from a Bhilwara to Jaipur where he edited a local newspaper Lokvani. The name is derived from Panagarh, a village east of Osian in Nagaur district of Rajasthan. His father wrote several books including the definitive work on the freedom movement in Rajasthan titled Rajasthan Main Swatantrata Sangram. He was born in the Oswal Jain community of Rajasthan.

He married Amita in 1981 and has two sons, Ananth Hirsh, a comic book author, and Ajay, a technologist and entrepreneur.

== Published Works ==
=== Books ===
- Lectures on International Trade (with J. Bhagwati and T.N. Srinivasan), MIT Press, September 1998.
- India: The Emerging Giant, New York, Oxford University Press, March 2008.
- India's Tryst with Destiny: Debunking Myths that Undermine Progress and Addressing New Challenges (with Jagdish Bhagwati), HarperCollins, 2012.
- State Level Reforms, Growth and Development in Indian States (with Pinaki Chakraborty and M. Govinda Rao), Oxford University Press, May 2014.
- Free Trade and Prosperity: How Trade Openness Helps Developing Countries Grow Richer and Combat Poverty, Oxford University Press, April 2019.
- New India: Reclaiming the Lost Glory, Oxford University Press, 2020.
- India's Trade Policy: The 1990s and Beyond, HarperCollins, April 2024.
- The Nehru-Era Economic History and Thought & Their Lasting Impact, Oxford University Press, June 2024.

== See also ==
- Indians in the New York City metropolitan area
