= Bharatpur Medical College =

Tertiary Medical college in Bharatpur, Rajasthan, India

Shree Jagannath Pahadia Medical College
- Other names: Government Medical College, Bharatpur (GMC Bharatpur)
- Type: Medical College and Hospital
- Established: 2018; 8 years ago
- Affiliations: Rajasthan University of Health Sciences
- Principal: Dr. Vivek Bharadwaj
- Location: Bharatpur, Rajasthan, India
- Website: https://education.rajasthan.gov.in/content/raj/education/bharatpur-medical-college--bharatpur/en/home.html#

Shree Jagannath Pahadia Medical College also known as GMC Bharatpur is a full-fledged tertiary Medical college in Bharatpur, Rajasthan. It was established in the year 2017. The college imparts the degree of Bachelor of Medicine and Surgery (MBBS) and MD/MS/DNB/Diploma in various Clinical and Non Clinical Branches, Nursing and para-medical courses are also offered. The college is affiliated with Rajasthan University of Health Sciences and is recognized by National Medical Commission. The selection to the college is done on the basis of merit through National Eligibility and Entrance Test. Dr Vivek Bharadwaj is the Principal and Controller of SJP Medical College, The college started MBBS courses in August 2018. The attached hospitals are Raj Bahadur Memorial (RBM) hospital with speciality and super speciality services along with gynae- paediatric hospital (Janana hospital) and Ram katori eye hospital. The college is well recognized by NMC and has been awarded excellence in doing fieldwork in the Bharatpur region.

RBM hospital is the biggest referral hospital in the region. The fest of college pioneered with "AAGAAZ" in 2018 and concluded with "AAGAAZ 2.0" in 2024. Now “FLAMES” is generally held in the month of October. Fest involves variety of Cultural and Sporting events. Flames 2023 and 2024 experienced Concerts and EDM Nights by top artists of the Country

== Courses ==
Bharatpur Medical College undertakes the education and training of students in MBBS courses and MD/MS/DNB courses
