= Barmer Medical College =

Government medical college in Rajasthan, India

Government Medical College, Barmer
- Other names: Barmer Medical College; GMC Barmer
- Type: Medical college and hospital
- Established: August 2019; 7 years ago
- Affiliations: Rajasthan University of Health Sciences
- Principal: Dr. Anoop Singh Gurjar
- Location: Jalipa cant, Barmer, Rajasthan, India, India
- Website: education.rajasthan.gov.in/content/raj/education/barmer-medical-college/en/home.html

Government Medical College, Barmer is a tertiary Medical college in Barmer, Rajasthan, India. It was established in the year 2019. The college imparts the degree of Bachelor of Medicine and Surgery (MBBS). Nursing and para-medical courses are also offered. The college is affiliated to Rajasthan University of Health Sciences and is recognized by National Medical Commission. The selection to the college is done on the basis of merit through NEET. The college has started MBBS courses from August 2019.

== Courses ==
Barmer Medical College undertakes the education and training of students MBBS courses.
