= S. P. Sudrania =

Indian paediatrician

S.P. Sudrania
- Born: 3 July 1936 (age 90); Jhunjhunu, India
- Citizenship: India
- Education: Rajasthan University, Darbhanga Medical College and Hospital, SMS Medical College
- Scientific career
- Fields: Paediatrics Medicine
- Website: www.drspsudrania.com

Swayambar Prasad Sudrania (born 3 July 1936) is a former senior consultant and professor in paediatrics at SMS Medical College Jaipur, Rajasthan, India. He is well-known and quoted for his work in electrocrygram, dermatoglyphics and oral rehydration solution. His Post Doctoral Thesis on "A Study of Serum Electrolytes in Infantile and early Childhood Diarrhoea (ORS)" was submitted to University of Rajasthan in 1966. He was awarded Vikas Ratna in 2000-2001 by the International Integration and Growth Society for his contribution towards development of medical sciences. He is also Nahar Samman winner of 1996-97 awarded by the Rajasthan Welfare Association.

Sudrania was born in Islampur, Jhunjhunu district of Rajasthan and completed his M.B.B.S. from Darbhanga Medical College and Hospital in 1962. He was the first M.D. (Paediatrics) from University of Rajasthan in 1966 where he topped the university; he was recipient of F.I.C.P. award from USA and F.R.S.T.M & H. award from U.K. apart from M.N.A.M.S. (Member of National Academy of Medical Sciences) award from Indian Academy of Medical Sciences for his academic career. He was granted position of Senior Scientist in Medical field by the Indian Council of Medical Research for 1993–94.

During 33 years of active service in Government of Rajasthan he treated/attended 25 lac children at national and international medical colleges and hospitals and conducted over 170 medical relief camps. Sudrania guided 18 doctorates in paediatrics and examined nearly 6,000 MBBS/DCH and M.D. students apart from mentoring numerous para-medical students. He was on foreign assignment for nearly six years and was deputed for medical and healthcare and delivering lectures in 29 countries of North America, South America Europe, Africa and Asia.

== Research career ==
Sudrania has guest lectured, read papers, chaired session in 29 countries including Sheraj (Iran) in 1976, Berlin in 1980, Tripoli (Libya) in 1981 and 1982, Manila in 1983, Rio de Janeiro (Brazil) in 1992, Atlanta (USA) in 1992, Cairo in 1995, and Durham (USA) in 1996 at Duke Medical Center, from which he got a fellowship. He was one of the members of O.R.S. Committee at WHO Headquarters at Geneva (Switzerland).

Sudrania held a number of positions: member of Indian Association for Advancement of Medical Education, member of Indian Academy of Paediatrics (President of Rajasthan in 1986), member of all Rajasthan Paediatrics Association (had been in Executive many times), member of Indian Medical Association (Secretary of state in 1974).

== Selected publications ==
- Incidence of Oxyuriasis in Paediatric Ward of Umaid Hospital of Jodhpur, read in International Arabic Conference of Parasitology - Sheraj (Iran), 1976.
- Incidence of Acute Juvenile Rheumatism in Un. Children Hospital "Tripoli, read in International Arabic Conference of Medicine, 1981.
- A Study on Marasmus anjd Kwashiorkor in Un. Children Hospital of Tripoli (Libya), read in International Arabic Conference of Paediatrics, 1982.
- Electrocrygram or Cry analysis as one of the diagnostic and prognostic tool in different diseases in paediatric practice. A new concept, read in National Conference of Japan, 1982.
- Dermatoglyphics for genetic disorders, read in International Conference of Paediatrics, Manila, 1983.
- Dermatoglyphics as diagnostic tool, paper read in XX World Congress of Paediatrics, Rio de Janeiro (Brazil), Sept. 1992 and Cairo (Egypt) Sept. 1995.
