= Jawaharlal Nehru Medical College, Belgaum =

Constituent medical school of KLE University in India

Jawaharlal Nehru Medical College, Belagavi
- Type: Private
- Established: 1963
- Affiliations: KLE University
- Principal: Dr. Rajesh Powar
- Location: Belagavi, Karnataka, India; 15°52′59.1″N 74°31′0.4″E
- Website: www.jnmc.edu

Jawaharlal Nehru Medical College, Belgaum (JNMC) is a constituent medical school of KLE University. It is located at Belagavi in Karnataka state. The college was earlier affiliated to the state unitary Rajiv Gandhi University of Health Sciences.

== Description ==
The college is recognized by the National Medical Commission, Malaysian Medical Council, and listed in W.H.O. World Directory of Medical Schools. The college has received funding from Indian Council of Medical Research, World Health Organization and National Institutes of Health, USA.

== Location ==
The college is located in a 100-acre campus in Belagavi. The college has a 1000-bed free charitable block as well as the 1250-bed KLE Society's Prabhakar Kore Hospital and Medical Research Centre on campus. The college also runs a rural hospital: Dr. Kamal Hospital & Medical Research Centre, 150 km away at Ankola.

== Ranking ==
University and college rankings

Medical – India
- India Today (2020): 39

JNMC was ranked 39 among medical colleges in India in 2020 by India Today.

== See also ==
- Jawaharlal Nehru Medical College, Wardha, Maharashtra, India
- Jawaharlal Nehru Medical College, Ajmer, Rajasthan, India
- Jawaharlal Nehru Medical College, Aligarh, Uttar Pradesh, India
