= Samin Sharma =

American interventional cardiologist (born 1955)

Samin K. Sharma
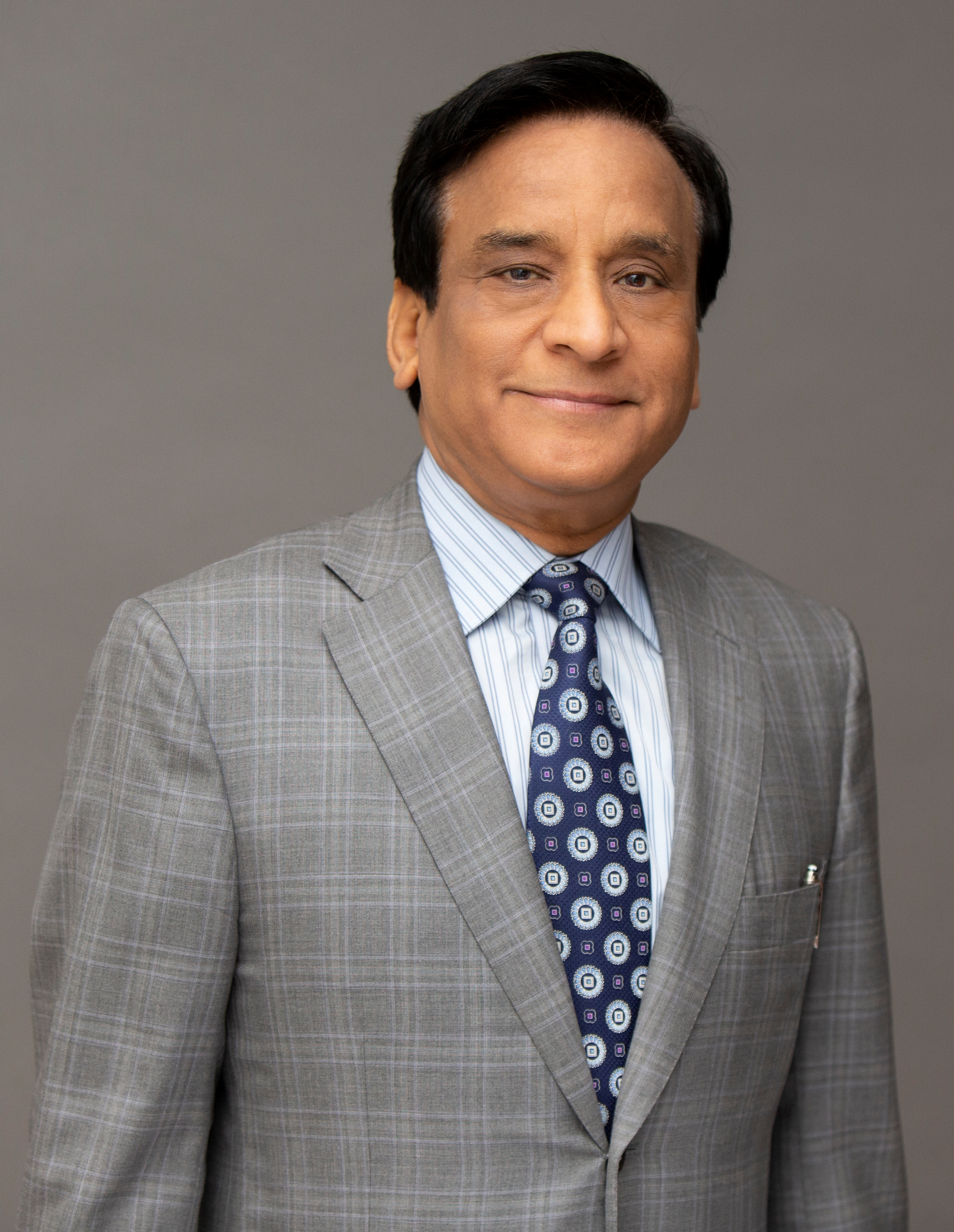
- Samin K. Sharma in 2019
- Born: May 28, 1955 (age 71); Alwar, India
- Occupation: Cardiologist
- Employer(s): The Mount Sinai Hospital; Dr. Samin K. Sharma Family Foundation Cardiac Catheterization Laboratory
- Known for: Interventional cardiology, co-founder, Eternal Heart Care Centre and Research Institute
- Spouse: Manju Sharma

Samin K. Sharma (born May 28, 1955) is an American philanthropist of Indian descent and an interventional cardiologist who co-founded the Eternal Heart Care Centre and Research Institute in Jaipur (EHCC). Sharma has served on New York State's Cardiac Advisory Board since 2004. As of 2021, he is Senior Vice-President, Operations & Quality at The Mount Sinai Hospital in New York and runs the Dr. Samin K. Sharma Family Foundation Cardiac Catheterization Laboratory. As of 2018, he is Chairman Board of Trustees, Association of Indians in America (AIA). As of 2022, he has been an investigator on 86 grants and multi-center trials and authored 486 peer-reviewed articles that have been cited 21,734 times.

== Biography ==
=== Education ===
Sharma was born to a Brahmin family in Alwar, India. He graduated from Rajgarh Higher Secondary School in Alwar. In 1972, he received his bachelor of science degree from University Maharaja College then his MBBS degree from SMS Medical Department of Pharmacy, Jaipur in 1978.

=== Early career ===
Sharma traveled to New York in 1983 for a three-year residency in internal medicine at the NY Infirmary-Beekman Downtown Hospital (1983-1986), a two-year fellowship in cardiology at Elmhurst Hospital in Queens (1986-1988). He trained with Mount Sinai's chief of cardiology, Dr. Valentín Fuster. He was concurrently an emergency department physician in Queens and was later hired to Mount Sinai's cardiology department. He is the director of the Mount Sinai Hospital Cardiac Catheterization Laboratory.

== Career ==
=== Specialty ===
Sharma specializes in the non-surgical treatment of mitral and aortic stenosis. He reportedly performed 3,722 angioplasties over three years (2005-2007) according to a study by the New York State Department of Health. He also performs rotational atherectomy, an alternative to angioplasty for complex, calcified coronary lesions. He has published extensively on the procedure and he is a principal investigator (PI) on scores of clinical trials and research grants analyzing and contrasting forms of interventional cardiology. In 2009, he performed a coronary angiography and angioplasty procedure on Indian Prime Minister Shri Manmohan Singh.

=== Clinical trials ===
As of 2022, Sharma participated as an investigator on more than 80 grants and multi-center trials. Recent and current trials focus on transcatheter aortic valve replacement, protracted percutaneous coronary interventions, outcomes of moderate to severely calcified coronary lesions, best practices, the performance of self-expanding vs balloon-expandable transcatheter aortic valve replacement, post-market device and procedural outcomes, refractory angina and rotational atherectomy.

=== Recognition ===
A partial listing of his awards and recognition includes Businessman of the Year by national Republican Congressional Committee for 2001-2002, Rajasthan Gaurav award in Jaipur by Rajasthan Government, India (2002), Rajive Gandhi Memorial Award for outstanding community service and medical excellence for India (2005), Governor's award of excellence for outstanding contribution to Medicine, New York State (2006), Ellis Island Medal of Honor (2011).

=== Eternal Heart Care Centre, Jaipur ===
Sharma co-founded the Eternal Heart Care Center in 2004 with his wife, Manju Sharma. This 250-bed tertiary multidisciplinary hospital offers care to patients of any socioeconomic status. The plan for this hospital was conceived in 2007 when the Sharmas met then-Chief Minister of Rajasthan, Vasundhara Raje. Sharma is as of 2021 documented as one of the organization's directors.

=== Controversy ===
Under Sharma's leadership, the cardiac catheterization lab at Mount Sinai has been implicated in allegations of Medicaid fraud, coaching emergency room patients to say they were having symptoms of a heart attack in order to receive reimbursement for advance scheduled interventional procedures. He has also been accused of inflating procedural numbers to unattainable records by having trainees perform his procedures without supervision. He received $4.8 million from billing for these procedures himself in 2012.

== Publications ==
=== Peer reviewed articles ===
According to ResearchGate, Sharma published 165 articles while affiliated with Icahn School of Medicine. According to Scopus, he has 486 publications as of 2022 that were cited 21,734 times across 18,988 documents. His h-index is listed as 60.

=== Books and book chapters ===
Partial list:

- Sharma S, Kini A. Advanced applied interventional cardiology, Cardiol Clin, 1e: Saunders 2010. ISBN 9781437718003
- Sharma S, Palacios I. Percutaneous approaches to valvular heart disease, Interventional Cardiology Clinics, 1e:Saunders 2012. ISBN 9781455738816
- Sharma S, Palacios, I (Consulting Editors), Kini A, Mehran R (Editors). Percutaneous Interventions in Women. Interventional Cardiology Clinics. 2012 ISBN 9781455744114
- Gidwani U, Sharma S, Kini A. Cardiovascular intensive care. Preface. Cardiol Clin 31(4):ix, 2013. ISBN 9780323242172
- Kini A, Narula J, Sharma S. Practical manual of interventional cardiology. Springer 2015. ISBN 978-1-4471-6581-1
- Farkouh M, Sharma S, Tomey M, Puskas J, Fuster V. Coronary artery bypass grafting and percutaneous interventions in stable ischemic heart disease. Hurt's The Heart 14e, Edited by Fuster V, Harrington R, Narula J, Eapen Z, published by McGraw-Hill 2017. (Chapter 44) ISBN 0071843248
