= Rajasthan University of Health Sciences =

State university in Jaipur, Rajasthan, India

- RUHS logo
- Motto: prāṇināmārtināśanam
- Motto in English: alleviation of the sufferings of all living beings
- Type: Public Medical University
- Established: February 25, 2005; 21 years ago
- Affiliations: UGC
- Chancellor: Governor of Rajasthan
- Vice-Chancellor: Pramod G. Yeole
- Location: Jaipur, Rajasthan, India; 26.7975°N 75.8266°E
- Campus: Urban
- Website: https://ruhsraj.org/

Rajasthan University of Health Sciences (RUHS) is a State university located in Jaipur, Rajasthan, India. It was established on 25 February 2005 under The Rajasthan University of Health Sciences (Act of Rajasthan Vidhan Sabha), 2005 (Act No. 1 of 2005) and started functioning in January 2006. It has its own college and acts as affiliating university to all Government & Society run [Also supports them in academic and research purposes] and some privately run medical colleges in Rajasthan.

== History ==
In 2005, Rajasthan Vidhan Sabha passed the act which replaced Rajasthan University as affiliating university to Government medical colleges in the western state of Rajasthan. Dr. P. P. S. Mathur, Senior Professor, Neurosurgery and Medical Superintendent, Sawai Man Singh Hospital, Jaipur served as the first Vice-Chancellor of the university. He was succeeded by Dr. Ashok Panagariya. It established its own university college in the year 2014 which goes by the same name. Earlier it functioned only as affiliating university.

== Courses ==
The university runs the following undergraduate and postgraduate courses:

- Medical courses: postgraduate education in medical studies, MBBS, Diploma courses.
- Dental courses: MDS, BDS.GNM
- Nursing courses: M.Sc., B.Sc. Nursing, Post basic B.Sc. nursing
- Paramedical science courses
- Physiotherapy and Occupational Therapy courses, B.A.S.L.P.(Bachelor in Audiology & Speech Language Pathology)
- Pharmacy courses: D. Pharma, B. Pharma and M.Pharma.

== Constituent Colleges ==
- RUHS College of Pharmaceutical Sciences, Jaipur – Established in the 2024–25 academic year, this constituent college is the only government pharmacy college in Rajasthan affiliated with RUHS. It offers a Bachelor of Pharmacy (B.Pharm) with an annual intake of 60 seats and a Master of Pharmacy (M.Pharm) in Pharmaceutics with 6 seats. Official Website

== Affiliated colleges ==
The following are affiliated to the university: 8 Medical colleges, 10 UG Dental colleges (BDS), 4 Postgraduate dental colleges (MDS), 43 B.Sc. Nursing Colleges, 2 M.Sc. Nursing Colleges, 6 Post Basic B.Sc. Nursing Colleges, 41 Pharmacy colleges (B. Pharmacy), 27 Pharmacy (D. Pharma), 30 Bachelor of Physiotherapy Colleges (BPT) and 4 M.Pharma colleges, with Bachelor of Occupational Therapy College (BOT), B.SC. Radiation Technology College, Post Basic Diploma In Oncology Nursing College, B.SC. (HONS.), Ophthalmic Technology College. Notable colleges include:

Government medical colleges

- Sawai Man Singh Medical College
- Sardar Patel Medical College, Bikaner
- Rabindranath Tagore Medical College
- Dr. Sampurnanand Medical College
- Jawaharlal Nehru Medical College, Ajmer
- Government Medical College, Kota
- RUHS College of Medical Sciences, Jaipur

Society Medical Colleges

- Government Medical College, Barmer
- Shree Jagannath Pahadia Medical College, Bharatpur
- Government Medical College, Dungarpur
- Jhalawar Medical College
- Rajmata Vijaya Raje Scindia Medical College, Bhilwara
- Pandit Deendayal Upadhyaya Medical College, Churu
- Government Medical College, Pali
- Shri Kalyan Government Medical College, Sikar

Government Pharmacy Colleges

- RUHS College of Pharmaceutical Sciences, Jaipur

Private Pharmacy Colleges

- Regional College of Pharmacy, Jaipur

Attached Hospitals

- RUHS Hospital of Medical Sciences, Jaipur
- RDBP Jaipuria Hospital, Jaipur

== See also ==
- Education in Rajasthan
