= Rabindranath Tagore Medical College =

Government medical college in Udaipur, Rajasthan, India

- Type: Public
- Established: 1961; 65 years ago
- Affiliations: Rajasthan University of Health Sciences
- Principal: Dr. Rahul Jain
- Students: 250 Per year
- Location: Udaipur, Rajasthan, India; 24.5762237°N 73.6911636°E
- Campus: Urban
- Website: education.rajasthan.gov.in/rntmcudaipur

Rabindranath Tagore Medical College, also known as RNT Medical College, is a government medical college situated in the city of Udaipur in the Indian state of Rajasthan. The principal and controller of the college is Dr. Rahul Jain.

== History ==
The college was established in 1961, in a building donated by the former Maharana of Udaipur. The college is spread over a campus of approximately 57 acres situated in the heart of the city.

Dr. B.N. Sharma, then Director of Medical and Health Services of Rajasthan, served as the college's first Principal and Controller, and was instrumental in building up the institution, including the establishment of its library in 1963.

The administrative block is housed in another historical palace donated by Salumber Rao. The college received recognition from the Medical Council of India in 1966, and is currently recognised by the National Medical Commission (NMC), which succeeded the MCI in 2020.

The college is named after the Indian Nobel laureate Rabindranath Tagore, a poet, writer, composer and painter.

== Academics ==
The admission to the Bachelor of Medicine, Bachelor of Surgery (MBBS) is highly competitive. Students who have graduated from high school with Physics, Chemistry and Biology as core subjects can appear for the NEET-UG examination. The medical college offers 250 seats in M.B.B.S. course, 92 in post-graduate degree courses, 12 in post-graduate diploma courses, and two seats each in DM Cardiology, MCh Neurosurgery, and MCh Cardiothoracic and Vascular Surgery (CTVS), totalling six super speciality seats across three disciplines.

15% of total M.B.B.S. seats are filled through the All India counselling conducted by the Medical Counselling Committee (MCC) and 4% seats are reserved for the Government of India nominees from the North-Eastern states. The remaining seats are filled through state level counselling conducted by the Office of the Chairman, NEET UG Medical and Dental Admission/Counselling Board and Principal & Controller, SMS Medical College and Hospital, Jaipur. Starting in 2013, undergraduate admissions is through the National Eligibility cum Entrance Test (NEET-UG).

50% of seats in each post-graduate speciality are filled through the All India Post Graduate Medical Entrance Examination and the remaining through Rajasthan Pre-PG Examination. The institute offers post-graduate degree courses in Preventive and Social Medicine, Pathology, Ophthalmology, ENT, General Medicine, General surgery, Obstetrics and Gynaecology, Pediatrics, Anesthesiology, Orthopedics, Radiodiagnosis/Radiology, Radiotherapy, Psychiatry, Tuberculosis and Respiratory Diseases, and Dermatology. Post-graduate diploma courses are offered in Anesthesiology, Pediatrics, and Obstetrics and Gynecology.

DM Cardiology seats are filled through the Super Specialty Entrance Examination conducted by the Rajasthan University of Health Sciences, Jaipur.

The following hospitals are attached to the college:

- Maharana Bhupal Government Hospital (1,306 beds)
- Pannadhay Zanana Hospital (440 beds)
- TB and Chest Hospital, Badi (260 beds)
- Baal Chikitsalaya Unit
- Hindustan Zinc Ltd. Cardiology Unit
- RSMML Cardiothoracic Unit
- Trauma Unit (97 beds)
- Shri Khemraj Katara Satellite Hospital, Hiran Magri (100 beds)
- Shri Sunder Singh Bhandari District Hospital, Chandpole (100 beds)
