= Sardar Patel Medical College =

Medical college in Bikaner, Rajasthan, India

Sarder Patel Medical College
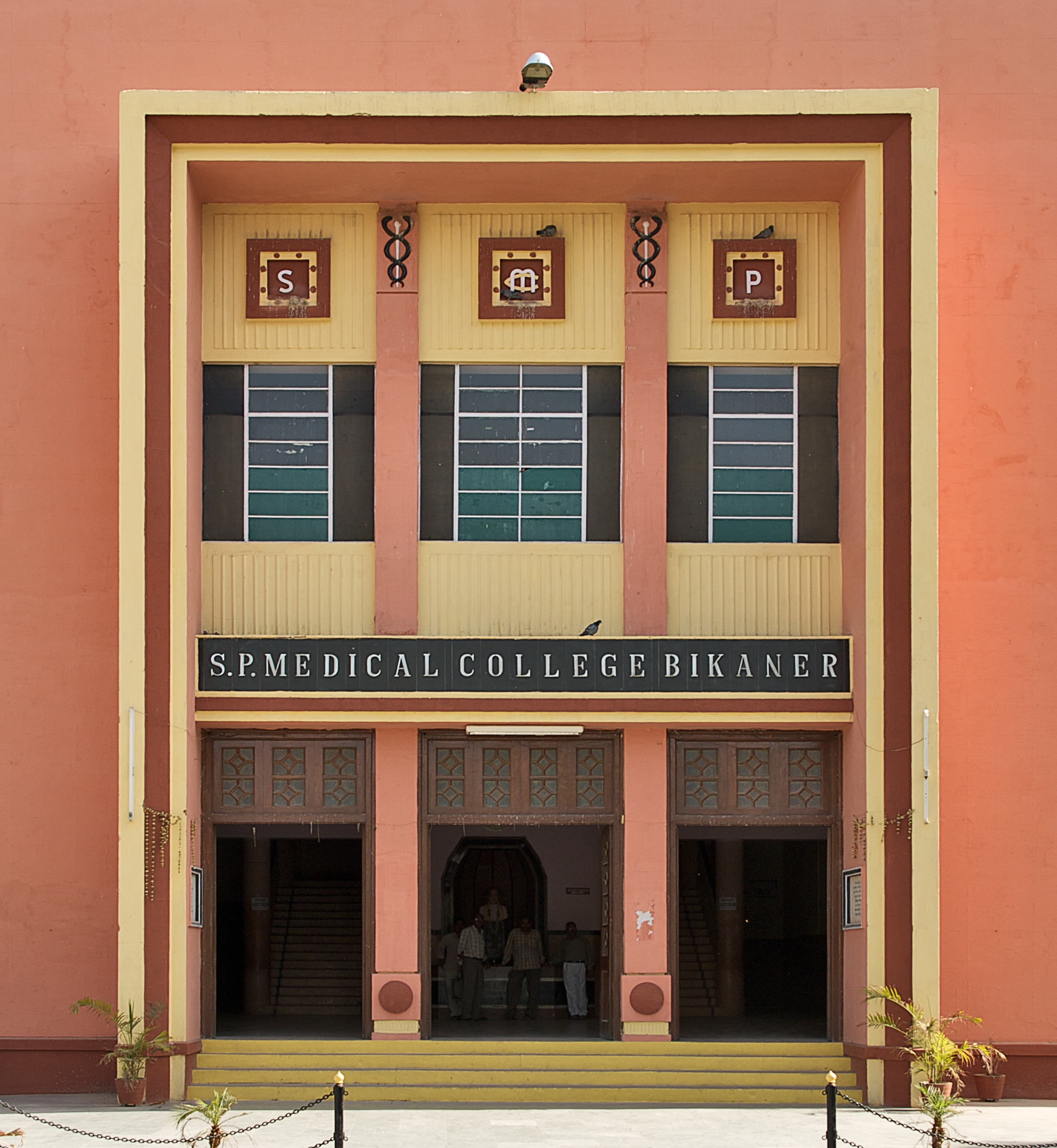
- Type: Public (Government medical college)
- Established: 1959; 67 years ago
- Affiliations: Rajasthan University of Health Sciences
- Principal: Dr. Surendra Kumar Verma
- Location: SP Medical College Rd, PBM Hospital, Bikaner, Rajasthan 334001, Bikaner, Rajasthan, 334001, India; 28°00′23″N 73°19′49″E
- Campus: Urban
- Recognition: National Medical Commission
- Undergraduates: 250 per year
- Nickname: SPMC
- Website: Official Website

Sarder Patel Medical College is a government medical college located in Bikaner (Rajasthan), India. Established in 1959, it is one of six government-run medical colleges in the western state of Rajasthan, and the second to be established in the state. It is affiliated with RUHS and provides education leading to the Bachelor of Medicine, Bachelor of Surgery (MBBS) degree (recognized by NMC) and MS/MD/DM degrees.

== History ==
The college was established in 1959 and was Rajasthan's second medical college. It was inaugurated by the former Prime Minister of India Pandit Jawaharlal Nehru and approved by MCI.

== Academics ==
There are 250 seats approved by the Medical Council of India for MBBS degree. The MBBS degree takes four and a half years to complete, followed by a year of a Compulsory Rotating Medical Internship. Postgraduate studies are offered in various fields.

== Notable alumni ==
- Karan Singh Yadav, former member of the Lok Sabha
- Kirodi Lal Meena, Indian politician
- Tirath Das Dogra, Indian forensic pathologist and former director of AIIMS, New Delhi

== Overview ==
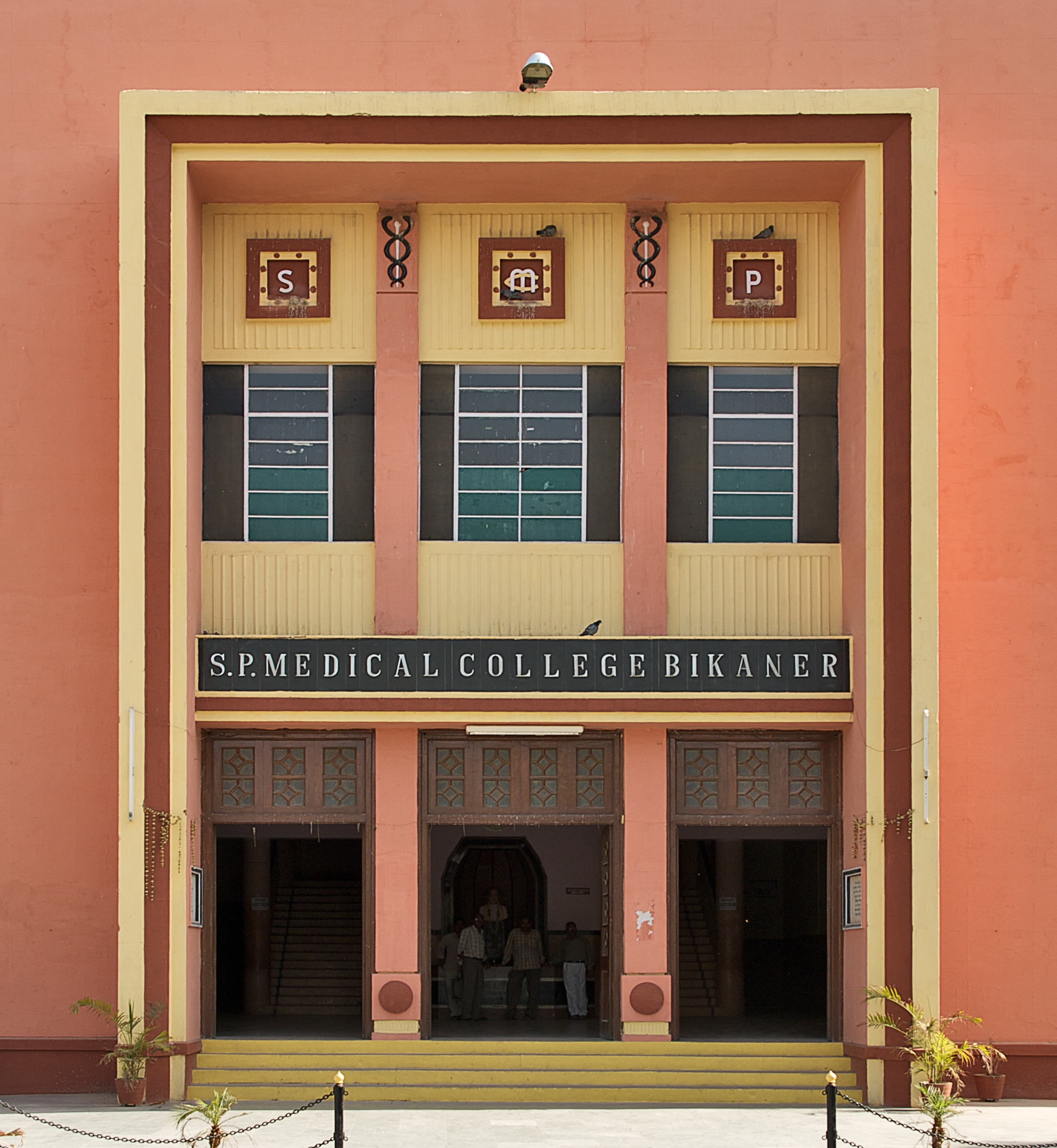

The college is fully funded by the government of Rajasthan. The college has 250 seats for MBBS and 63 for the post grad students. and 18 in diploma, two seats in DM cardiology and two seats in MCh Urology.

The following hospitals are attached to Sarder Patel Medical College:

- PBM Hospital
- G.G.J. TB Hospital
- Eye Department
- Pediatrics Department
- Haldiram Moolchand Govt. Center for Cardiovascular Research
- Acharya Tulsi Regional Cancer Institute and Research Centre
- Trauma Centre
- Geriatric Research Centre
- Diabetic Research Centre

== Accommodation ==
There are separate hostels for students, four for undergraduate boys, one for girls, one for interns and two for postgraduate students.
