= Chandrabhan Singh =

Indian politician

Chandrabhaan Singh

Member of the Rajasthan Legislative Assembly
- In office 1990 - 1993, 1998 – 2003

President of Rajasthan Pradesh Congress Committee
- In office 2009–2014
- Preceded by: C. P. Joshi
- Succeeded by: Sachin Pilot

Minister Government of Rajasthan
- In office 14 March 1990 – 26 October 1990
- In office 5 December 1998 – 4 December 2003

Personal details
- Born: 6 May 1952 (age 74) Jhunjhunu, Rajasthan
- Party: Indian National Congress
- Other political affiliations: Janata Dal (before 1998)
- Education: Sawai Man Singh Medical College
- Occupation: Politician
- Profession: Doctor

Chandrabhan Singh (born 6 May 1952) is an Indian politician and doctor. He is former president of the Rajasthan Pradesh Congress Committee. He was elected to the Rajasthan Legislative Assembly for two terms and served as minister in both terms. He hails from Jaisinghpura in Jhunjhunu district of Rajasthan. He obtained his Bachelor of Medicine, Bachelor of Surgery degree from SMS Medical College, Jaipur.

== Career ==
Singh political career began with the Janata Dal. He was elected to the Rajasthan Legislative Assembly from Mandawa, Jhunjhunu for the first time in 1990 and served as the minister of Transport and Technical Education in Bhairon Singh government.

He then joined the Indian National Congress and won from Todar Raisingh, Tonk (now Malpura) for the second term in Rajasthan Legislative Assembly and became minister in Energy and Industry department in Ashok Gehlot government.

He served as the president of Rajasthan Pradesh Congress Committee from 2009 to 2014.
