= Dr. Sampurnanand Medical College =

Government medical college in Jodhpur, Rajasthan, India

Coordinates: 26.2694184°N 73.0052125°E

- Type: Public (Government medical college)
- Established: 1965; 61 years ago
- Principal: Dr. B. S. Jodha
- Address: Residency Road, Sector-D, Shastri Nagar, Jodhpur, Rajasthan-342003, Jodhpur, Rajasthan, India
- Campus: Urban
- Affiliations: Rajasthan University of Health Sciences, Jaipur
- Website: medicaleducation.rajasthan.gov.in/jodhpur/

Dr. Sampurnanand Medical College (SNMC) is a government medical college situated in the city Jodhpur of Indian state Rajasthan which was established in 1965. It celebrated the completion of its Golden Jubilee in 2015.

== History ==
It was established in 1965. In 1974–75 postgraduate course were also started. Presently post graduation is available in 19 different fields. It serves the population of western Rajasthan. Every year about 250 students enter MBBS course via NEET UG. Entrance to post graduate courses are via Rajasthan PrePG and All India Pre PG Exam.

It serves as a trauma center and tertiary care center in the western Rajasthan. The following hospitals are attached to it :

- Mahatma Gandhi hospital (MGH): General hospital
- Ummed Mahila and Shishu chikitsalaya: Children's & Women's Hospital
- K. N. Chest Hospital: Specialized TB & Chest hospital
- Mathura Das Mathur hospital (MDM) (also called as New Teaching hospital): General Hospital

== Alumni ==
- Digamber Singh - politician, former minister in the Government of Rajasthan

== Controversy ==
In June 2025, Dr. Rakesh Bishnoi, a postgraduate medical student at SN Medical College in Jodhpur, Rajasthan, died after consuming poison. He died during treatment at SMS Hospital in Jaipur. Following his death, his family and fellow doctors gathered outside the hospital’s mortuary, alleging that Dr. Bishnoi had faced mental distress due to delays in thesis approval by his department head.

Rashtriya Loktantrik Party (RLP) leader and Nagaur MP Hanuman Beniwal urged the government to register a case against the department head and address the family’s demands promptly. Beniwal also contacted the Director general of police and Jodhpur police commissioner to discuss the matter.
