= All India Institute of Medical Sciences, Jodhpur =

Medical college & research institute in Rajasthan, India

- Official seal of AIIMS Jodhpur
- Motto: Sarve Santu Nirāmayāḥ (Sanskrit)
- Motto in English: May All be Healthy
- Type: Public Medical University
- Established: 17 September 2012; 14 years ago
- President: Dr. Tejas Madhusudan Patel
- Director: Dr. Sanjeev Sinha (additional charge)
- Academic staff: 213 (2022)
- Students: 1,219 (2022)
- Undergraduates: 717 (2022)
- Postgraduates: 483 (2022)
- Doctoral students: 19 (2022)
- Location: Jodhpur, Rajasthan, 342005, India; 26°14′20.26″N 73°0′18.79″E
- Campus: Suburban, 180 acres (73 ha)
- Website: aiimsjodhpur.edu.in

All India Institute of Medical Sciences, Jodhpur (AIIMS Jodhpur; IAST: Akhil Bharatiya Aayurvigyan Sansthan Jodhpur) is a medical institute and medical research public university located in Jodhpur, India. It is considered an Institute of National Importance, and is one of twenty All India Institutes of Medical Sciences (AIIMS). It was established in 2012 and operates autonomously under the Ministry of Health and Family Welfare.

The institute is mandated in medical education, research, patient care and the establishment of models for an affordable and quality healthcare through innovations. AIIMS Jodhpur is governed under AIIMS Act, 1956.

== Establishment ==
The All-India Institute of Medical Sciences (Amendment) Bill, 2012, was introduced in the Lok Sabha on 27 August 2012. This bill replaced an Ordinance which allowed the six AIIMS institutes to become operational from September 2012. Lok Sabha passed the AIIMS (Amendment) Bill, 2012 on 30 August 2012. Prior to that, the six new AIIMS were registered under the Indian Societies Registration Act and the Bill allowed them to become autonomous bodies corporated on the lines of the existing AIIMS Delhi in Delhi. AIIMS (Amendment) Bill, 2012 was introduced in Rajya Sabha on 3 September 2012. Rajya Sabha passed the AIIMS (Amendment) Bill, 2012 on 4 September 2012, and the six AIIMS started operating in September 2012. All AIIMS are public teaching hospitals and are mandated with training in various courses (MBBS, MD/MS, DM/MCH, BSc Honours in Nursing, MSc, MPH, PhD). AIIMS Jodhpur is also delivering Joint Program in MedTech in collaboration with Indian Institute of Technology (IIT) Jodhpur.

== Location ==
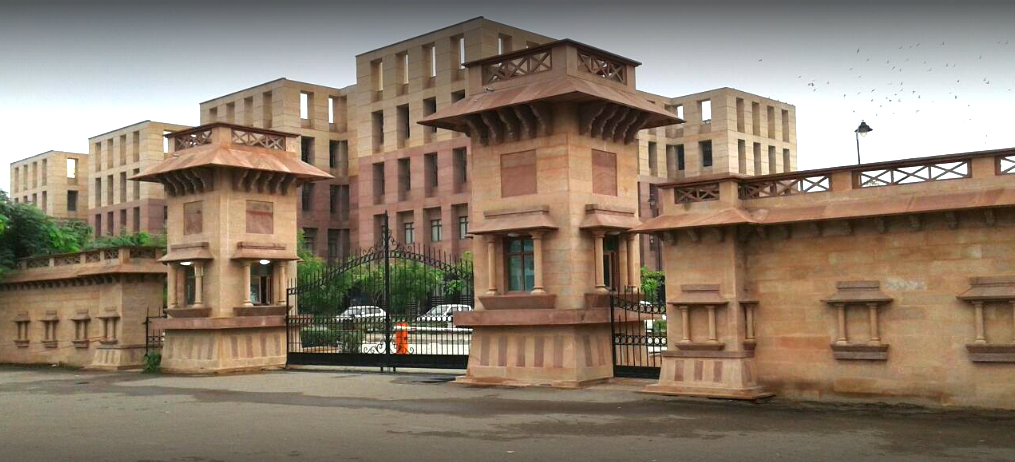
A picture of All India Institute of Medical Sciences, Jodhpur

AIIMS Jodhpur(Rajasthan) is situated at outskirts of city of Industrial Area Basni, Jodhpur. On 31 January 2004, then Finance Minister Jaswant Singh (Jasol) had laid the foundation stone of AIIMS Jodhpur. Sushma Swaraj, then Health Minister, and Rajnath Singh, then Agriculture Minister, were also present on the occasion. Jodhpur is located in the geographical center of Rajasthan and is also the entry point for Thar Desert in Western India.

== Academics ==
From 2013 onwards AIIMS started admitting 100 MBBS and 60 BSc Nursing(Hons.) students. Outdoor patient(OPD) services began at the AIIMS Jodhpur from 27 July 2013. AIIMS has started MD courses in Anatomy, Biochemistry, Physiology and Community Medicine and Family Medicine departments from 2016. AIIMS Jodhpur started Postgraduate courses in 20 departments from 2017 with 56 seats. Admissions to the post graduate courses is done through a common entrance exam known as Institute of National Importance-Common Entrance Test (INI-CET) along with PGI, Chandigarh, JIPMER Puduchery, NIMHANS Bangalore and SCTIMS, Trivandrum. AIIMS Jodhpur admits 194 PG students every year. The institute also admits students in superspeciality (DM/MCH) program through INI-SS Exams conducted by AIIMS Delhi. AIIMS Jodhpur uses innovations in Medical Education and patient care. AIIMS Jodhpur Model of Medical Education utilizes Unconventional Learning Experiences (UNCLE) for delivering Competency Based Medical Education in its special sessions on Saturdays. The President of India, Shri Ram Nath Kovind graced and addressed the students during the 2nd Convocation of the institute on 7 December 2019 and lauded the efforts of AIIMS Jodhpur in collaborating with IIT Jodhpur for medical innovation course.

== AIIMS Jodhpur Model of Medical Education ==
AIIMS Jodhpur has established a unique model for medical education. The model introduced since beginning of the Institute in 2012, centered around involving both faculty facilitators as well as students. One day in a week (Saturdays) is devoted for implementing innovative ideas or pedagogical methods with students as primary stakeholders. Department are joined by mutidisciplines for theme based integrated teaching sessions. This makes the learning of a subject engaging and contextual to patient care right from beginning. The model also incorporates sessions with UNCoventional Learning Experiences (UNCLE) where innovative methods like Flipped Classroom, teaching professionalism, using Clickers (Audience Response System) for involving even the quiet students, using 'Reverse Telelmedicine' for taking patients from hospital or ICUs to classroom or hostel.

== National Ranking ==
=== 1. National Institutional Ranking Framework (NIRF) ===
University rankings

Medical – India
- NIRF (2024): 16
- India Today (2024): 14

All India Institute of Medical Sciences, Jodhpur (IR-D-U-0689) ranked 13th and 16th in National Institutional Ranking Framework (NIRF) of Ministry of Education for Medical category in years 2023 and 2024 respectively.

=== 2. India Today Ranking, 2024 ===
AIIMS Jodhpur ranked 14 by the India Today magazine for year 2024.

== Research and Publication ==
Institute mandate is to build evidences through clinical, laboratory, community and translational research. Medical students are encouraged to get involved in research under guidance of faculty members. Faculty engagement in research is visible through Scopus. The Scopus affiliation ID for AIIMS Jodhpur: 60108918

== AIIMS Hospital ==
=== Overview ===
AIIMS Jodhpur hospital has five floor Out-patient department (OPD) Block housing all broad and super-speciality except Physical Medicine & Rehabilitation (PMR) department which is housed separately on ground-floor accessible to all patients with disability. OPD is disabled friendly with 6 elevators (Lifts) and ramp. Emergency & Trauma block is accessible through Gate 3 with ambulance bay. The block has ground, first and second floors while emergency triage is located at ground-floor. Emergency OT's are located at ground-floor and 2nd floor. Trauma Intensive Care is located on 2nd floor. The emergency block also houses a Dialysis Unit on the first floor with 11 machines. The diagnostic block is located backside of the Emergency block on ground and 1st floor. Advanced equipments are available in Radiology department which includes two CT scanners, two MR scanners (3T), Digital Subtraction Angiography (DSA) suite for all interventional procedures along with fluoroscopy, Mammography, sonography and digital X-rays. The Nuclear Medicine department is having a PET-CT scan. Pathology department is having facilities for Immunohistochemistry (IHC) and Molecular pathology supported by Department of Health Research -"DHR-ICMR Advance Medical Oncology Diagnostic Services (DIAMONDS)" The institute has 30 modular Operation Theaters, 30 bedded Intensive Care Unit (ICU), 16 bedded Pediatric Intensive Care Unit (PICU) and 18 bedded Neonatal Intensive Care Unit (NICU). Robotic surgeries are being carried out for difficult to reach areas like Urology, gynecology, Pediatric and cancer surgeries. More than 500 robotic surgeries have been performed by December 2021. Overall, the institute is able to provide high class care for difficult, high risk and cases with dilemma.

== Centers of Excellence ==
=== 1. Center of Excellence for Tribal Health, AIIMS Jodhpur ===
Ministry of Tribal Affairs (MoTA) Government of India has chosen AIIMS Jodhpur as one of their Center of Excellence (CoE) for Tribal Health. The objectives were to study the practices of Tribal healers, piloting of Telemedicine and understanding common diseases for which awareness can be created.

=== 2. Center of Excellence in Oncology under India-Sweden Innovation Center ===
As part of India-Sweden Innovation center, a tripartite agreement between AIIMS Jodhpur, AIIMS Delhi and Business Sweden, a Live CoE, the first project on Comprehensive Cancer Patient Support Service was established in AIIMS Jodhpur campus to deliver treatment to cancer patients. The center was launched along with felicitation of 10 start-ups selected for the 2nd edition of India-Sweden innovation challenge at Dubai Expo 2020 on 31 January 2022.

== Projects ==
GenomeIndia: Cataloguing the Genetic Variation in Indians

AIIMS Jodhpur is part of a project under Department of Biotechnology (DBT), Government of India in a flagship project, a pan-India initiative focused on Whole Genome Sequencing of representative populations across India. The goal of the initiative is to carry out whole genome sequencing and subsequent data analysis of 10,000 individuals representing the country's diverse population. Institute is assigned to engage various community through its Community Engagement and Involvement initiative, obtain consent, create awareness, obtain clinical and biochemical phenotype and request their samples for high level whole exome sequencing and biobanking.

== Annual Reports of the Institute ==
=== Annual Report 2016-17 ===
The annual report highlighted work done by the faculty, residents, students and staff of the institute during 2016–17. Notable among them was that the institute was awarded the "Certificate of Commendation" and a sum of Rupees Fifty Lacs by the Ministry of Health & Family Welfare, Government of India (GoI) under its "Kayakalp Program". The program recognize the efforts made towards cleanliness and hygiene and creating awareness to encourage the same among public for better health. The institute also continued with its paperless system, aligned with the Government "Digital India" initiative.

=== Annual Report 2015-16 ===
The year witnessed progress in multiple fronts. The notable event was visiting by Hon'ble Health Minister Shri J P Nadda on 6 June 2015.

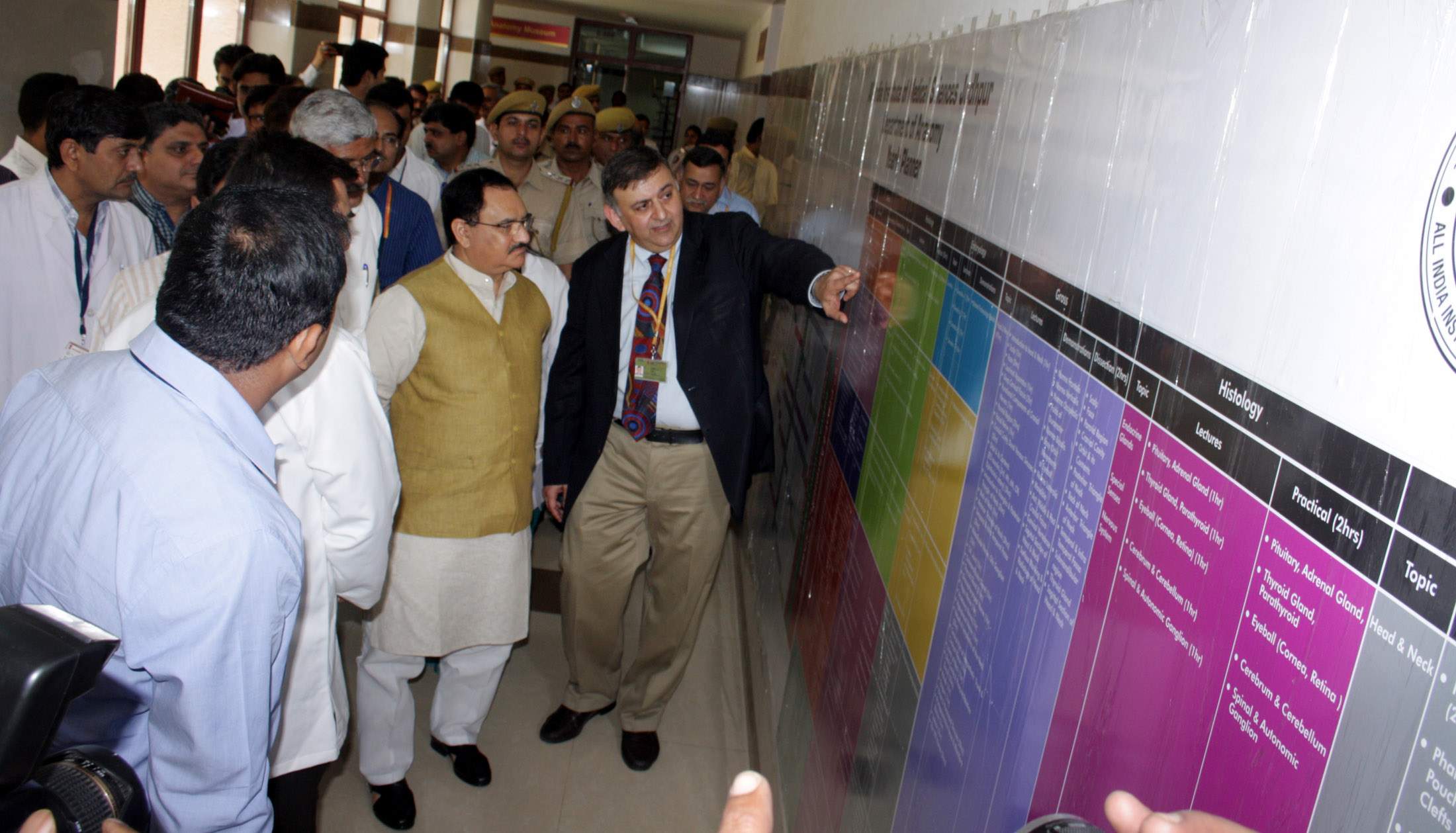
J.P. Nadda visiting after inaugurating the four new facilities including Physical Medicine and Rehabilitation Block, Blood Bank and Central Lab Block, at AIIMS, in Jodhpur on 6 June 2015

The Health Minister, who was also President of the Institute Body, inaugurated Laboratory Complex, Blood Bank, Physical Medicine & Rehabilitation Block and Computerized Patient Management System. He also visited other facilities.

=== Annual Report 2014-15 ===
The OPD and IPD services at AIIMs, Jodhpur grew during the year 2014–15. The Institute began its OT complex where all types of surgeries have been performed. More than 86,000 patients visited the OPD and nearly 2500 patients were admitted in the IPD during the year.

== See also ==
- All India Institute of Medical Sciences
- Education in India
- List of medical colleges in India
