= Sawai Man Singh Hospital =

- associated with Sawai Man Singh Medical College
- Location within Jaipur Location within Rajasthan Location within India

Geography
- Location: Jaipur, India
- Coordinates: 26.905641°N 75.815549°E

Organisation
- Affiliated university: Rajasthan University of Health Sciences

Services
- Beds: >6,000

History
- Constructed: 3 March 1934
- Opened: March 11, 1936; 90 years ago

Links
- Lists: Hospitals in India

Sawai Man Singh Hospital (also known as SMS Hospital) is a tertiary care public hospital located in Jaipur, Rajasthan, India. Founded by Sawai Man Singh II, the erstwhile ruler of Jaipur, its foundation stone was laid on 3 March 1934 and it was inaugurated on 11 March 1936. It is associated with Sawai Man Singh Medical College and provides healthcare across all specialties and super-specialties, while also serving as a major centre for medical education and research. In 2018, the hospital recorded more than 2.9 million outpatient visits and over 200,000 inpatient admissions. The hospital have more than 6,000 beds, making it the largest public hospital in Rajasthan.

== History ==
SMS hospital was established by H.H. Sawai Man Singh II, the then ruler of Amber. The foundation stone was laid on 3 March 1934, and the hospital was formally inaugurated on 11 March 1936. Initially designed in an L-shaped structure with a capacity of 300 beds, the institution began with teaching in five core MBBS subjects. Over time, it expanded to include all major specialties and super-specialties, with new disciplines such as blood transfusion medicine, sports medicine, and critical care medicine being introduced. By 2018, the hospital had recorded 2,937,249 outpatient visits and 213,271 inpatient admissions.

== Campus ==
SMS hospital campus in located in central Jaipur (Jawaharlal Nehru Marg / Ashok Nagar area) and comprises multiple blocks including outpatient departments (OPD), inpatient wards, specialty blocks, operation theatres, intensive care units and diagnostic facilities. The complex includes facilities such as imaging (X-ray, CT, MRI), clinical laboratories, blood bank, trauma and emergency services, and a dedicated cancer centre among its units. As of 2025, SMS hospital have more than 6,000 beds, making it the largest public hospital complexes in the state of Rajasthan.

=== Departments ===
SMS Hospital provides comprehensive care across medical and surgical specialties.

- General Medicine, General Surgery
- Cardiology and Cardiothoracic care
- Neurosurgery and Neurology
- Orthopaedics and Traumatology
- Obstetrics & Gynaecology and Paediatrics
- Oncology (Birla Cancer Centre and associated services)
- Nephrology, Urology and Transplant services
- Emergency medicine and a large trauma centre
- Diagnostic services (pathology, microbiology, imaging)

=== Education and research ===
It is the clinical training site for Sawai Man Singh Medical College (SMS Medical College) and supports undergraduate (MBBS), postgraduate and super-specialty medical education programmes. SMS Medical College is affiliated with the Rajasthan University of Health Sciences (RUHS).

== 2025 fire ==
On 5 October 2025, a fire broke out at the neurosurgery trauma intensive care unit around 11:20 pm. The fire broke out late at night in a storeroom adjoining the ICU, reportedly due to a short circuit. Later the trauma ward filled with smoke. In this incident, as per the initial media reports at least six to eight patients died, while several others were left in critical condition.

Many of these victims were comatose or dependent on life support. Relatives alleged that hospital staff left the ward as the smoke spread, leaving attendants with patients.

Multiple political leaders expressed their grief, including Prime Minister Narendra Modi and Chief Minister Bhajan Lal Sharma. Former Chief Minister Ashok Gehlot and RLP leader Hanuman Beniwal demanded a probe. Later, the Government of Rajasthan constituted a six-member committee for investigation.

== See also ==
- Sawai Man Singh Medical College
