= Sawai Man Singh Medical College =

Medical college in Rajasthan, India

- Type: Government
- Established: 1947; 79 years ago
- Affiliations: Rajasthan University of Health Sciences, NMC
- Principal: Dr. Deepak Maheshwari
- Location: Jaipur, Rajasthan, India; 26°54′20.83″N 75°49′8.92″E
- Website: medicaleducation.rajasthan.gov.in/smsjaipur/

Sawai Man Singh Medical College, also known as SMS Medical College, is a government medical college in Jaipur, Rajasthan state, India. It was established in 1947 and was the 15th centre for medical education in India.

== History ==
SMS Medical College marks its start with the establishment of a maternity hospital, a dispensary and a medical school in Jaipur in 1855, officially inaugurated in 1861. However, this medical school was closed in 1864. It was only in 1945 that Mirza Ismail, the Diwan (Prime Minister) of the Jaipur State, started working on the project of establishing a medical college in the state, which was to be the 15th centre for medical education in India. The foundation stone was laid down by Lord Wavell, the Governor-General and Viceroy of India, on 13 March 1946 and Sawai Man Singh Medical College was officially opened in 1947.

The first principal of the college was G.N. Sen who was replaced shortly afterwards by S.C. Mehta. In 1951, S.K. Menon took over as principal. In 1952 the college was recognized by the National Medical Commission and postgraduate courses started in 1952.

== Attached hospitals ==
A list of hospitals attached to the SMS Medical College. This list does not include the satellite hospitals in Jaipur.

- Sawai Man Singh Hospital.
- Super Speciality Hospital.
- Mahila Chikitsalaya.
- Institute of Respiratory Diseases, Shastri Nagar. (For Tuberculosis, Lung cancer, Chronic obstructive pulmonary disease etc.)
- Psychiatric Center.
- JK Lon Hospital (SPMCHI – Sir Padampad Mother and Child Health Center).
- Zanana Hospital – specialised in gynaecology.
- Isolation Hospital (for highly Infectious Diseases).
- HB Kanwatia Hospital.
- State Cancer Institute.
- Pandit Deen Dayal Upadhyay Government Hospital/Gangori Hospital.
- S. R. Goyal Government Hospital.
- Satellite Hospital, Banipark.

== Notable alumni ==
- Mahendra Bhandari, Padma Shri
- Farooq Abdullah, former Chief Minister of Jammu and Kashmir
- Ashok Panagariya
- Maya Tandon, Padma Shri
- Samin Sharma
- Shiv Kumar Sarin
- Chandrabhan Singh
- S. P. Sudrania
- Jyoti Mirdha
- Veer Singh Mehta
- Anita Bhandari

== Rankings ==
University rankings

General – India
- NIRF (Overall) (2024): 151-200

Medical – India
- NIRF (2024): 43

In 2024, SMS medical college was ranked 43rd among medical college in India by National Institutional Ranking Framework (NIRF). It was also ranked in 151-200 band overall in 2024.
