= List of institutions of higher education in Andhra Pradesh =

In Andhra Pradesh there are 3 central universities, 19 central autonomous Institutions, 28 state universities, 7 deemed universities and 13 state private universities

== Central universities ==
#	Universities	Location	Established	Specialization	Section	
#	Universities	Location	Established	Specialization	2(f)	12(B)
1	Central University of Andhra Pradesh	Anantapur	2018	General	Yes	Yes
2	Central Tribal University of Andhra Pradesh	Vizianagaram	2019	General	Yes	Yes
3	National Sanskrit University	Tirupati	1956 (2020^{†})	Sanskrit	Yes	Yes

^{†} granted deemed university status in 1989 and later central university status in 2020

== Central institutions (autonomous institutions) ==
#	Universities	Location	Established	Specialization
1	All India Institute of Medical Sciences	Mangalagiri - Tadepalli	2018	Health care
2	Indian Institute of Management	Visakhapatnam	2015	Management
3	IIT Tirupati	Tirupati	2015	Technology
4	Indian Institute of Information Technology, Design and Manufacturing	Kurnool	2015	Technology
5	Indian Institute of Information Technology	Sri City	2013	Technology
6	Indian Institute of Petroleum and Energy	Visakhapatnam	2016	R&D in the Hydro Carbon
7	Indian Institute of Science Education and Research	Tirupati	2015	Science
8	Indian Maritime University – Visakhapatnam Campus	Visakhapatnam	2008	Naval Architecture
9	National Institute of Technology, Andhra Pradesh	Tadepalligudem	2015	Technology
10	National Institute of Oceanography	Visakhapatnam	2015	General
11	School of Planning and Architecture, Vijayawada	Vijayawada	2008	Planning, Architecture
12	National Institute of Design	Amaravati	2015	Design
13	Indian Culinary Institute, Tirupati	Tirupati	2016	BBA–Culinary
14	Indian Institute of Packaging (not started)	Visakhapatnam (not started)	2018	Packaging
15	Indian Institute of Foreign Trade	Kakinada	2018	MBA–IB
16	Indian Institute of Tourism and Travel Management	Nellore	2016	Tourism Management
17	National Institute of Ocean Technology (not started)	Nellore (not started)	2015	Ocean Technology
18	National Institute for Research on Commercial Agriculture	Rajamahendravaram	1947	Tobacco Research
19	National Academy of Customs Indirect Taxes and Narcotics	Hindupur	2015	Customs & Narcotics

== State universities ==
There are 29 state public universities in the state.

#	University	Location	Section		Established	Specialization
#	University	Location	2(f)	12 (B)	Established	Specialization
1	Acharya N. G. Ranga Agricultural University	Guntur	Yes	No	1964	Agricultural
2	Acharya Nagarjuna University	Guntur	Yes	Yes	1976	General
3	Adikavi Nannaya University	Rajamahendravaram	Yes	Yes	2006	General
4	Andhra Kesari University	Ongole	Yes	No	2022	General
5	Andhra Pradesh Fisheries University	Vijayawada	Yes	No	2020	Ichthyology
6	Andhra University	Visakhapatnam	Yes	Yes	1926	General
7	Cluster University	Kurnool	Yes	No	2019	General
8	Damodaram Sanjivayya National Law University	Visakhapatnam	Yes	Yes	2008	Legal
9	Dr. Y. S. R. Architecture and Fine Arts University	Kadapa	Yes	No	2020	Architecture and Fine Arts
10	Dr. Abdul Haq Urdu University	Kurnool	Yes	No	2016	General and Urdu
11	Dr. B. R. Ambedkar University	Srikakulam	Yes	Yes	2008	General
12	Dr. B. R. Ambedkar Open University	Eluru (Note: The temporary campus is located in Vijayawada until the permanent campus is built in Eluru)	Yes	No	2026 (Note: Established in 1982 as "Andhra Pradesh Open University" and later renamed as "Dr. B. R. Ambedkar Open University" during the combined Andhra Pradesh. In 2025, the university was established by a act for the bifurcated Andhra Pradesh. The UGC recognized the university in 2026.)	Distance education
13	Dr. NTR University of Health Sciences	Vijayawada	Yes	No	1986	Healthcare
14	Dr. Y. S .R. Horticultural University	Tadepalligudem	Yes	No	2011 (Note: Established in 2007 as "Andhra Pradesh Horticultural University". The UGC lists 2011, the year of the act that renamed it.)	Horticulture
15	Dravidian University	Kuppam	Yes	Yes	1997	Dravidian languages
16	Jawaharlal Nehru Technological University, Anantapur	Anantapur	Yes	Yes	1946	Technology
17	Jawaharlal Nehru Technological University, Kakinada	Kakinada	Yes	Yes	1946	Technology
18	Jawaharlal Nehru Technological University, Gurajada, Vizianagaram	Vizianagaram	Yes	No	2022	Technology
19	Krishna University	Machilipatnam	Yes	Yes	2008	General
20	Rajiv Gandhi University of Knowledge Technologies	Nuzvid	Yes	Yes	2008	Technology
21	Rayalaseema University	Kurnool	Yes	Yes	2008	General
22	Sri Krishnadevaraya University	Anantapur	Yes	Yes	1981	General
23	Sri Padmavati Mahila Visvavidyalayam	Tirupati	Yes	Yes	1983	Women's only
24	Sri Venkateswara Institute of Medical Sciences	Tirupati	Yes	Yes	1993	Medical
25	Sri Venkateswara University	Tirupati	Yes	Yes	1954	General
26	Sri Venkateswara Vedic University	Tirupati	Yes	No	2006	Vedic studies
27	Sri Venkateswara Veterinary University	Tirupati	Yes	No	2005	Veterinary school
28	Vikrama Simhapuri University	Nellore	Yes	Yes	2008	General
29	Yogi Vemana University	Kadapa	Yes	Yes	2006	General

== State private universities ==
There are 18 state private universities in the state.

#	University	Location	Recognised
1	Aditya University	Surampalem	2024
2	Annamacharya University	Rajampet	2024
3	B.E.S.T Innovation University	Gongivaripalli	2019
4	Centurion University of Technology and Management	Vizianagaram	2017
5	Chalapathi University	Guntur	2026
6	Godavari Global University	Rajamahendravaram	2024
7	Krea University	Sri City	2017
8	Mohan Babu University	Tirupati	2022
9	Pragati University	Surampalem	2026
10	RVS University	Chittoor	2026
11	Saveetha Amaravati University	Amaravati	2018
12	Sricity International University	Sri City	2026
13	SRM University	Amaravati	2017
14	The Apollo University	Chittoor	2021
15	Vasireddy Venkatadri International Technological University	Amaravati	2025
16	Veltech University	Tirupati	2025
17	Vishnu Women's University	Bhimavaram	2026
18	VIT-AP University	Amaravati	2017

== Deemed universities ==
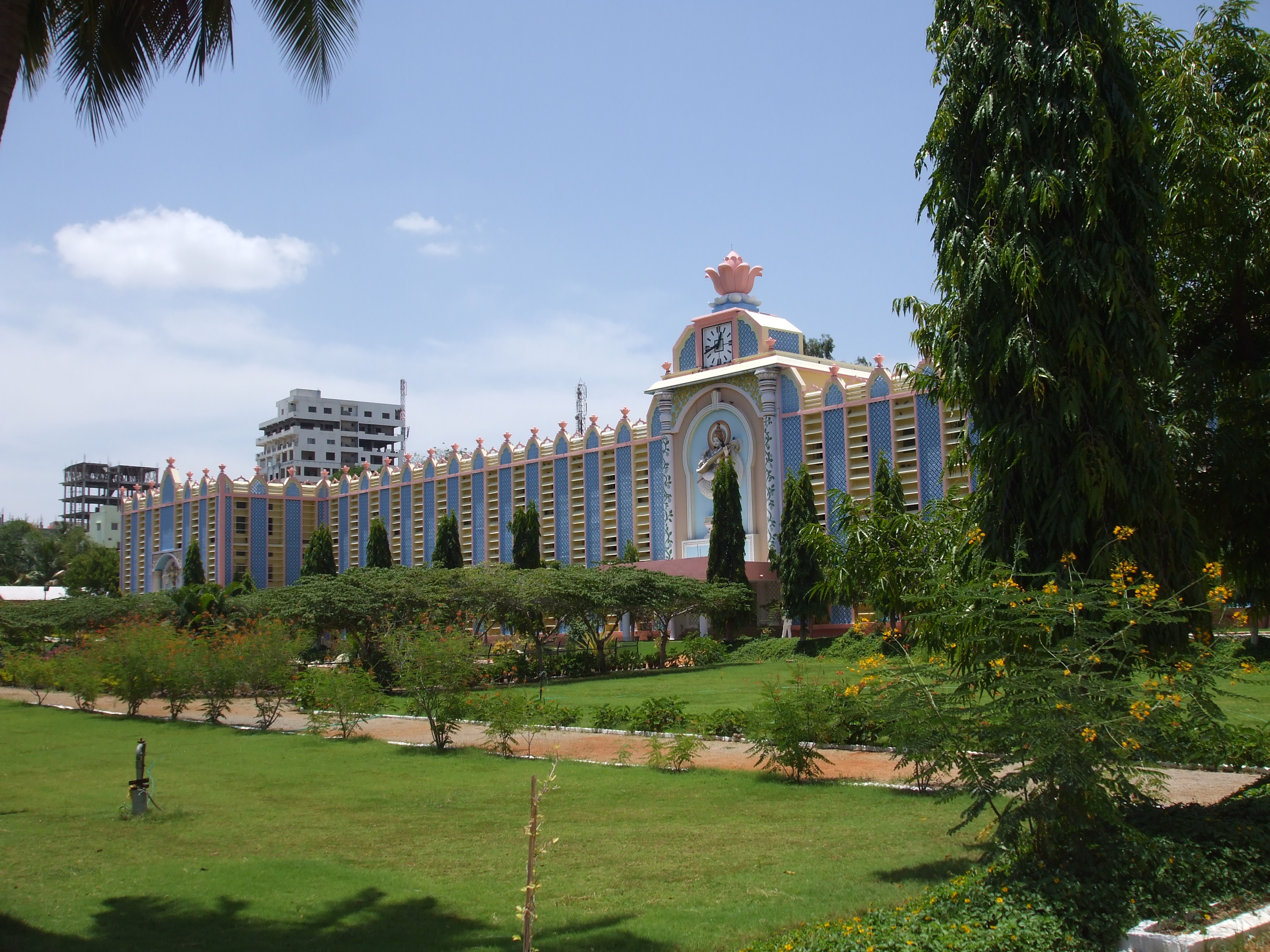
Sri Sathya Sai University

#	University	Location	Established	Specialization	Section	
#	University	Location	Established	Specialization	III	12 (B)
1	Audisankara Deemed to be University	Gudur	2001 (2025^{†})	Multidisciplinary	Yes	No
2	Dr. RVR NRI Institute of Technology	Vijayawada	2008 (2026^{†})	General	Yes	No
3	Gandhi Institute of Technology and Management	Visakhapatnam	1980 (2007^{†})	General	Yes	Yes
4	GMR Institute of Technology	Rajam	1997 (2026^{†})	Technology	Yes	No
5	KL University	Guntur	1980 (2009^{†})	Technology	Yes	Yes
6	Madanapalle Institute of Technology and Science	Madanapalle	1998 (2025^{†})	Technology	Yes	No
7	Siddhartha Academy of Higher Education	Vijayawada	1977 (2024^{†})	General	Yes	Yes
8	Sri Sathya Sai Institute of Higher Learning	Puttaparthi	1981 (1981^{†})	General	Yes	Yes
9	Vignan's Foundation for Science, Technology & Research	Guntur	1997 (2009^{†})	Technology	Yes	Yes

^{†} granted deemed university status

== Colleges ==
=== Engineering colleges ===
There are 33 engineering colleges in the state.

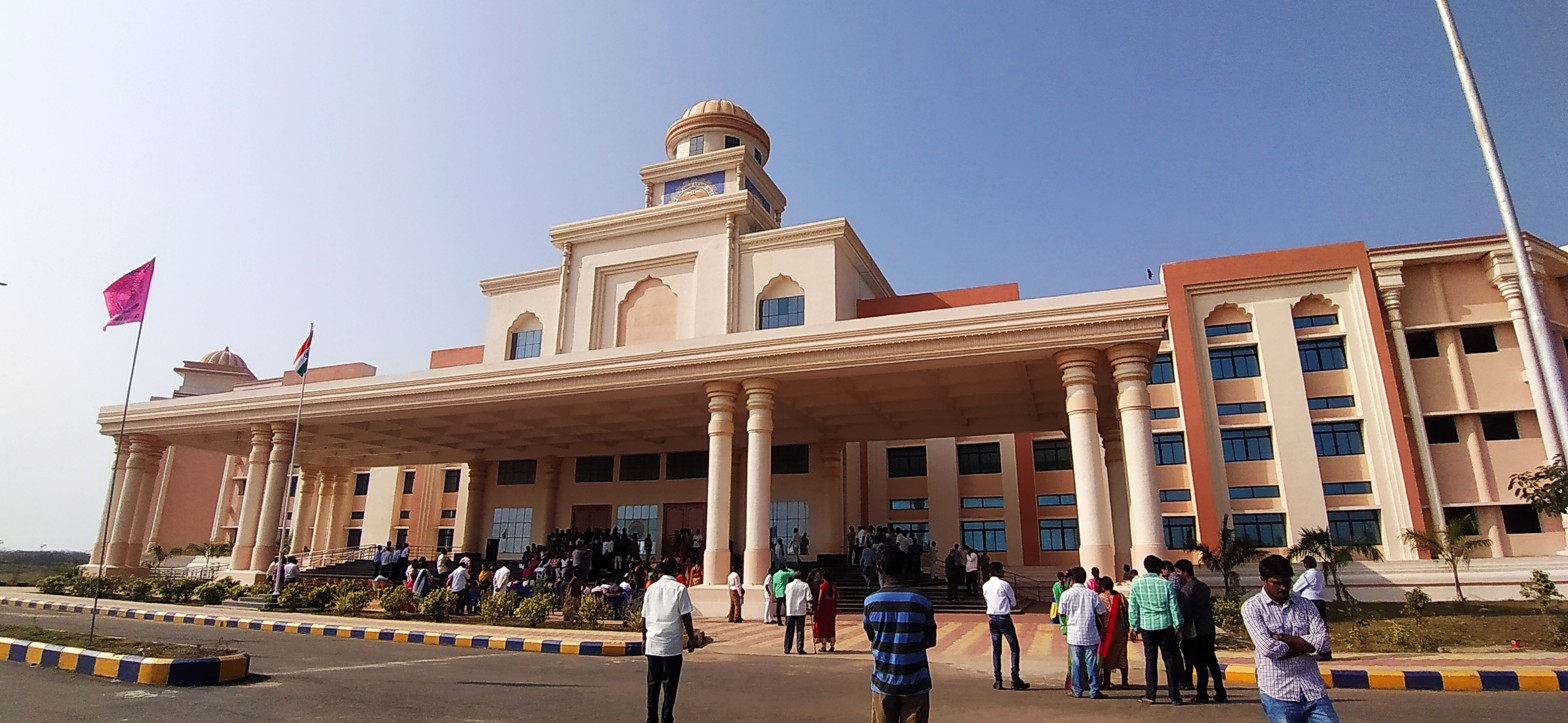
Krishna University College of Engineering and Technology

S No.	College	Location
1	Aditya Institute of Technology and Management	Tekkali
2	Anil Neerukonda Institute of Technology and Sciences	Visakhapatnam
4	Bapatla Engineering College	Bapatla
5	Bonam Venkata Chalamayya Engineering College	Odalarevu
6	Dhanekula Institute of Engineering and Technology	Vijayawada
7	DVR & Dr. HS MIC College of Technology	Vijayawada
8	Adoni Arts and Science College	Adoni
9	Gayatri Vidya Parishad College of Engineering	Visakhapatnam
10	G Pulla Reddy College of Engineering & Technology	Kurnool
11	Gudlavalleru Engineering College	Gudlavalleru
12	KSRM College of Engineering	Kadapa
13	Lakkireddy Bali Reddy College of Engineering	Vijayawada
14	MVGR College of Engineering	Vizianagaram
15	Narasaraopeta Engineering College	Narasaraopet
16	NBKR Institute of Science & Technology	Vidyanagar, Nellore
17	QIS College of Engineering and Technology	Ongole
18	Quba College of Engineering and Technology Nellore	Venkatachalam
19	Raghu Engineering College	Visakhapatnam
20	Rajeev Gandhi Memorial College of Engineering & Technology	Nandyala
21	RVR & JC College of Engineering	Guntur
22	Sagi Rama Krishnam Raju Engineering College	Chinamiram
23	Seshadri Rao Gudlavalleru Engineering College	Gudlavalleru
24	Shree Institute of Technical Education	Tirupati
25	Sree Vidyanikethan Engineering College	Tirupati
26	Sri Sivani College of Engineering	Chilakapalem
27	Sri Vasavi Engineering College	Tadepalligudem
28	Sri Venkatesa Perumal College of Engineering & Technology	Tirupati
29	St. Ann's College of Engineering & Technology	Chirala
30	Siddharth Institute of Engineering & Technology	Puttur
31	Tenali Engineering College	Tenali
32	Vignan's Institute of Information Technology	Visakhapatnam
33	Vishnu Institute of Technology	Bhimavaram

=== Law colleges ===
1. Dr. B. R. Ambedkar College of Law, Visakhapatnam
2. Acharya Nagarjuna University, Guntur
3. Damodaram Sanjivayya National Law University, Visakhapatnam
4. Sri Venkateswara College of Law, Tirupati
5. GITAM School of Law, Visakhapatnam
6. Klu law college, Vijayawada
7. NVP Law College, Visakhapatnam
8. JC College of Law, Guntur
9. PS Raju Law College, Kakinada
10. Daita Sriramulu Hindu College of Law, Machilipatnam
11. Sri R.K.M. Law College, Chittoor
12. Sri Eshwar Reddy College of Law, Tirupati
13. Visakha Law College, Visakhapatnam
14. Indira Priyadarshini Law College, Ongole
15. Veeravalli College of Law, Rajamahendravaram
16. KKC College of Law, Chittoor
17. Anantha College of Law, Tirupati
18. Smt Velagapudi Durgamba Siddhartha Law College, Vijayawada
19. Dr Ambedkar Global Law Institute, Tirupati
20. Sri Vijayanagar College of Law, Anantapur
21. V.R. Law College, Nellore
22. NS Law College, Markapuram
23. D.N.R.College of Law, Bhimavaram,

=== Medical colleges ===
1. All India Institute of Medical Sciences, Mangalagiri
2. Andhra Medical College, Visakhapatnam
3. Rangaraya Medical College, Kakinada
4. Guntur Medical College, Guntur
5. Kurnool Medical College, Kurnool
6. Sri Venkateswara Medical College, Tirupati
7. Sri Padmavathi Medical College for Women, Tirupati
8. Sri Venkateswara Institute of Medical Sciences, Tirupati
9. Siddhartha Medical College, Vijayawada
10. A. C. Subba Reddy Government Medical College, Nellore
11. Government Medical College, Srikakulam
12. Government Medical College, Kadapa
13. Government Medical College, Ongole
14. Government Medical College, Anantapur
15. Government Medical College, Vizianagaram
16. Government Medical College, Paderu
17. Government Medical College, Rajamahendravaram
18. Government Medical College, Eluru
19. Government Medical College, Machilipatnam
20. Government Medical college, Piduguralla
21. Government Medical College, Markapuram
22. Government Medical College, Adoni
23. Government Medical College, Pulivendula
24. Government Medical College, Madanapalle
25. Government Medical College, Nandyal
26. Great Eastern Medical School and Hospital,Srikakulam
27. Maharajah Institute of Medical Sciences, Vizianagaram
28. Gayathri Vidya Parishad Institute of Health Care and Medical Technology, Visakhapatnam
29. GITAM Institute of Medical Sciences and Research, Visakhapatnam
30. NRI Institute of Medical Sciences, Visakhapatnam
31. GSL Medical College, Rajamahendravaram
32. konaseema institute of medical sciences, Amalapuram
33. Alluri Sitaram Raju Academy of Medical Sciences, Eluru
34. Dr Pinnameni Siddhartha Institute of Medical Sciences, Vijayawada
35. Nimra Institute of medical Sciences, Vijayawada
36. NRI Academy of Medical Sciences, Mangalagiri - Tadepalli
37. Katuri Medical College, Guntur
38. Narayana Medical College,Nellore
39. P.E.S. Institute of Medical Sciences and Research, Kuppam
40. Viswabharathi Medica College, Kurnool
41. Fatima institute of medical sciences, Kadapa
42. Apollo institute of medical sciences, Chittoor
43. Sri satya Sai institute of Higher Medical Sciences, Puttaparthi
44. Santhiram Medical College, Nandyal

=== Others ===
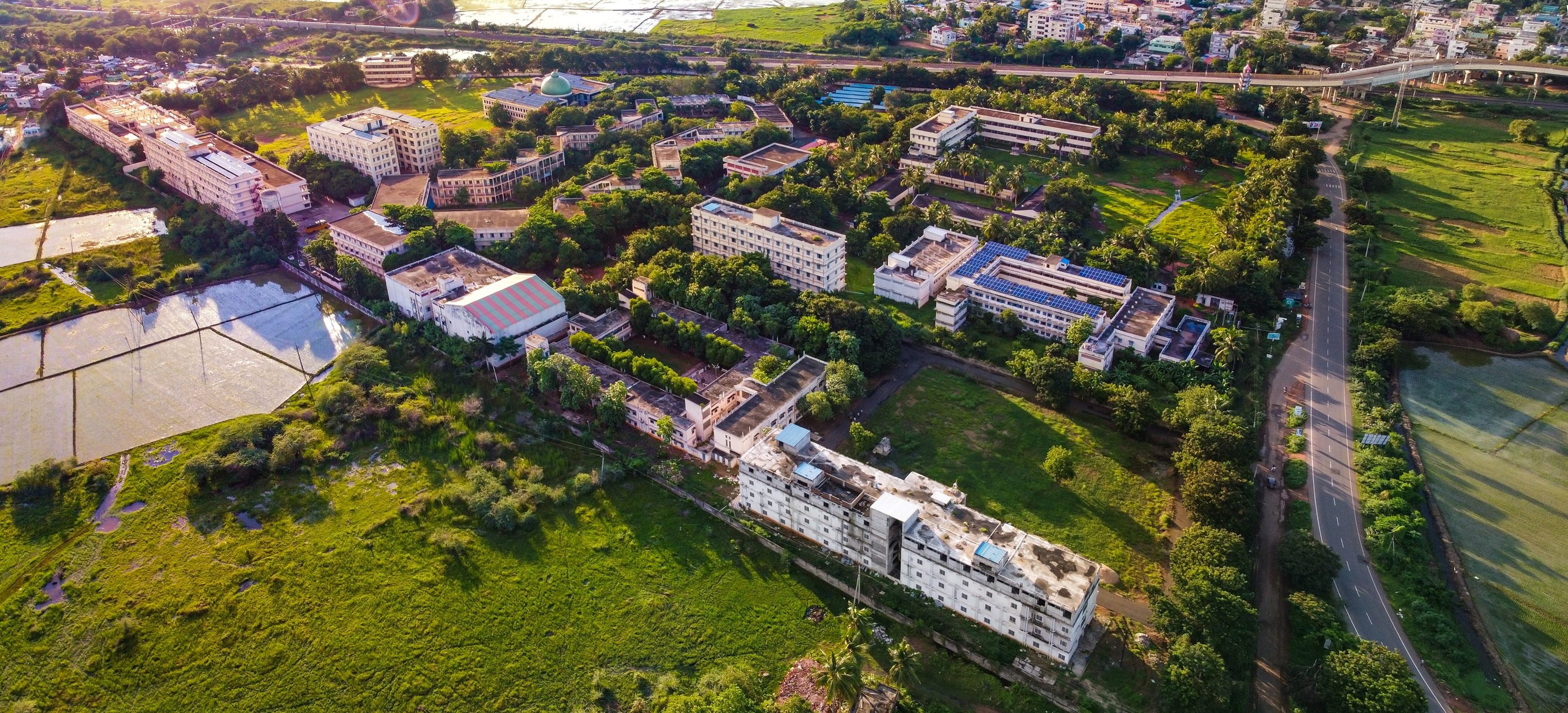
C.R.Reddy Educational Institutions, Eluru

- Andhra Loyola College
- Andhra Pradesh Residential Degree College
- Aditya Degree college
- Kakaraparti Bhavanarayana College
- Mrs. A. V. N. College (Est 1860) Visakapatnam
- Sir C.R. Reddy Educational Institutions
- SMVM Polytechnic, Tanuku
- Sree Vidyanikethan Educational Trust (SVET)
- S.T.S.N. Government Degree College, Kadiri
