= Lingam (surname) =

Lingam (Telugu: లింగం) is a Telugu surname. Notable people with the surname include:

- Lingam Suryanarayana (born 1923), Indian surgeon
- Lingam Venkata Prabhakar, Indian businessman
