= VIIT (disambiguation) =

VIIT may refer to:

- Vignan's Institute of Information Technology, an engineering institution run by the Vignan group of Guntur, situated in Duvvada, a suburban region of Visakhapatnam, India
- Villa Institute of Information Technology, an institute of Villa College, in the Maldives
- Vishwakarma Institute of Information Technology, a private autonomous engineering college in Kondhwa Budruk, Pune, Maharashtra, affiliated with Savitribai Phule Pune University (SPPU), India
- Военный институт (инженерно-технический), Voennyy institut inzhenerno-tekhnicheskiy (VIIT), the former name of the Military Engineering-Technical University (Voennyy inzhenerno-tekhnicheskiy universitet, VITU), in Saint Petersburg, Russia
