= Nalanda Educational Institutions =

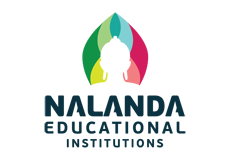

Information
- Type: For-profit
- Motto: Excellence By Virtue
- Established: 1988
- Founders: Late I. V. Kameswara Rao, Late Sri A. V. Subba Rao, Late Sri K. Basava Purnaiah, Late Sri K. Rambabu
- Chairman: Sri Atluri Vijaya Babu
- Faculty: 1,200
- Grades: Pre-school to post-graduation
- Enrollment: Over 14,000
- Campuses: Day school with residential facilities
- Houses: Mythri, Sahana, Tejus, Deeksha
- Affiliation: Schools are affiliated to CBSE and IB. Colleges are affiliated to Krishna University.
- Website: www.nalanda.edu.in

Nalanda Educational Institutions (NEI) is a private educational society based in Vijayawada, Andhra Pradesh, India. Founded in August 1988, the organization operates an integrated network of preschools, primary and secondary schools, junior intermediate colleges, and higher education graduation centers across Andhra Pradesh and Telangana. The institution manages a collective student enrollment exceeding 14,000 pupils, guided by a faculty of 1,200 educators.

== Mission ==
The stated mission of the society is to inspire the academic, emotional, societal, physical, creative, and spiritual potential of every individual to help them achieve their aspirations, while promoting self-learning methodologies and creativity outside the traditional classroom environment.

== Campuses ==
The educational group structures its active academic delivery across distinct tiers of primary, secondary, and higher education.

=== Degree Colleges ===
The tertiary education division offers undergraduate and post-graduate pathways affiliated with Krishna University. These include:

- Nalanda Degree & PG College, Vijayawada: M.G. Road, Labbipet
- Nalanda Degree College, Vijayawada: Bhavanipuram
- Nalanda Degree College, Machilipatnam: Pavitra College premises, Ramanaidupeta

=== Playschools ===
Early childhood education is administered under regional micro-campuses:

- Nalanda Toddlers, Vijayawada: Benz Circle
- Nalanda Toddlers, Vijayawada: Satyanarayana Puram
- Nalanda Toddlers, Vijayawada: Edupugallu
- Nalanda Toddlers, Vijayawada: Machavaram
- Nalanda Toddlers, Vijayawada: 1 Town
- Bloomingdale international school (Village campus) Pre-Primary, Vijayawada: Benz Circle

=== CBSE School Campuses ===
Co-educational primary and secondary schooling operations are anchored by branches following the Central Board of Secondary Education (CBSE) curriculum framework under School Code 57039:

- Nalanda Vidyaniketan, Vijayawada: Benz Circle (Primary and Secondary Campuses)
- Nalanda Vidyaniketan, Penamaluru: Edupugallu (Vasantha Campus)

=== IB School Campuses ===
Premium international-tier curricula are managed under the International Baccalaureate (IB) framework under School Code 060155:

- Bloomingdale International School, Vijayawada
- Bloomingdale International School, Penamaluru: Galileo Campus

== Campus Life and Athletics ==
Primary and secondary student cohorts are organized into a standardized four-tiered house structure—Mythri, Sahana, Tejus, and Deeksha—to govern internal athletic, artistic, and academic competitions. The society provides specialized training setups for sports, with the institutional cricket squad frequently qualifying for the final rounds of the KDCA Cricket School League.

The group regularly hosts regional university tournaments, including the Krishna University Intercollegiate Women Kabaddi championship, regional badminton selections, and youth cultural fests. The Penamaluru campus also hosts regional chess Opens, with institutional infrastructure drawing visits from notable sports figures like Grandmaster Koneru Humpy.

== Civic Engagement and CSR ==
The institution coordinates regular corporate social responsibility (CSR) initiatives. Every year prior to the festival of Ganesh Chaturthi, students organize environmental conservation campaigns, running public workshops to mold and distribute eco-friendly clay Ganesha idols. Additional community tracks include fundraising drives for regional orphanages, student contributions for state capital structural planning, and Swachh Bharat cleanliness campaigns managed by the NCC teams.

During emergency scenarios, such as the municipal floods, the tertiary campuses served as active public relief and supply distribution centers. The institutions also partner with local public services to run traffic safety awareness rallies, Red Cross blood donation drives, International Yoga Day events, public science fairs, and local ecological green campaigns.

== Notable alumni ==
- Jyothi Surekha Vennam – International compound archer, Asian Games triple-gold medalist, and Arjuna Award recipient, who completed her primary and secondary education at Nalanda Vidyaniketan.

== Awards and Recognition ==
- National Achievers' Award: Awarded the "National Achievers' Award for Educational Excellence" during academic conventions in New Delhi.
- Times Business Awards: The Nalanda Vidyaniketan division was awarded the regional "Best CBSE School" title for three consecutive years.
- Education World Citations: Nationally ranked and recognized within the "Best Technology Integrated School" category for institutional digital infrastructure implementation.
