= Gogulampadu =

- Village
- Interactive map of Gogulampadu
- Country: India
- State: Eluru

Gogulampadu is a village near Nuzvid in Eluru district, Andhra Pradesh, India. It is about 10 kilometres from Nuzvid.
