= Guna Muppuri =

Indian-Jamaican physician

- Occupation: Physician
- Known for: Founder of Indies Pharma Jamaica and Bioprist Group
- Awards: Order of Distinction (Officer Class), Pravasi Bharatiya Samman, Anthony N. Sabga Caribbean Award for Excellence

Guna Sekhar Muppuri is an Indian-born Jamaican physician. His work has been associated with the generic pharmaceutical industry and medical education in the Caribbean.

In 2019, he received the Pravasi Bharatiya Samman, the highest honor conferred by the President of India on non-resident Indians. In 2021, he was appointed an Officer of the Order of Distinction by the Government of Jamaica for contributions to medicine and philanthropy. He has also been named a laureate of the Anthony N. Sabga Caribbean Awards for Excellence.

== Early life and education ==
Originally from India, Muppuri graduated from Sri Venkateswara University Medical College in Tirupati before migrating to Jamaica in 1992. He initially worked as a medical officer and family physician in both the public and private sectors for over 20 years.

== Career ==
In 2003, Muppuri founded Indies Pharma Jamaica Limited, which developed into a distributor of generic pharmaceuticals in Jamaica. The company has worked with the National Health Fund to support the supply of medications.

Muppuri is also the founder and CEO of the Bioprist Group, a conglomerate with holdings in real estate, investment, and medical education. The group includes its subsidiary, Indies Pharma Jamaica Limited. Through the group, he developed the Bioprist Knowledge Park in Lucea, Hanover, a Special Economic Zone (SEZ) to host international educational partnerships. In Montego Bay, he established the Bioprist Institute of Medical Sciences. He was also involved in the development of the MJS Industrial Park, an SEZ and industrial hub in Spanish Town, St. Catherine.
