= Dr. NTR University of Health Sciences =

Public University in Andhra Pradesh, India

Coordinates: 16°30′58.95″N 80°40′9.34″E

- Motto: Vaidyo nārāyaṇo hariḥ
- Motto in English: "The physician is a manifestation of Lord Narayana."
- Type: Public
- Established: 1 November 1986; 39 years ago
- Affiliations: UGC
- Chancellor: Governor of Andhra Pradesh
- Vice-Chancellor: Pulala Chandrasekhar
- Location: Vijayawada, Andhra Pradesh, India
- Campus: Urban
- Website: drntr.uhsap.in

Dr. NTR University of Health Sciences (NTRUHS) is a public university in the city of Vijayawada, Andhra Pradesh.

== History ==
The university was established as "University of Health Sciences" by the Government of Andhra Pradesh and was inaugurated on 9 April 1986 by N. T. Rama Rao, the then-Chief Minister of the state. It started functioning on 1 November 1986 with Rama Rao as the university's first chancellor. Following the death of Rama Rao, a directive was issued by the Government of Andhra Pradesh to rename the university "NTR University of Health Sciences", and the renaming was carried out on 2 February 1998. Later, in 2006, the Government of Andhra Pradesh to rename the university to 'Dr. NTR University of Health Sciences'" The university celebrated its silver jubilee from 1–3 November 2011.

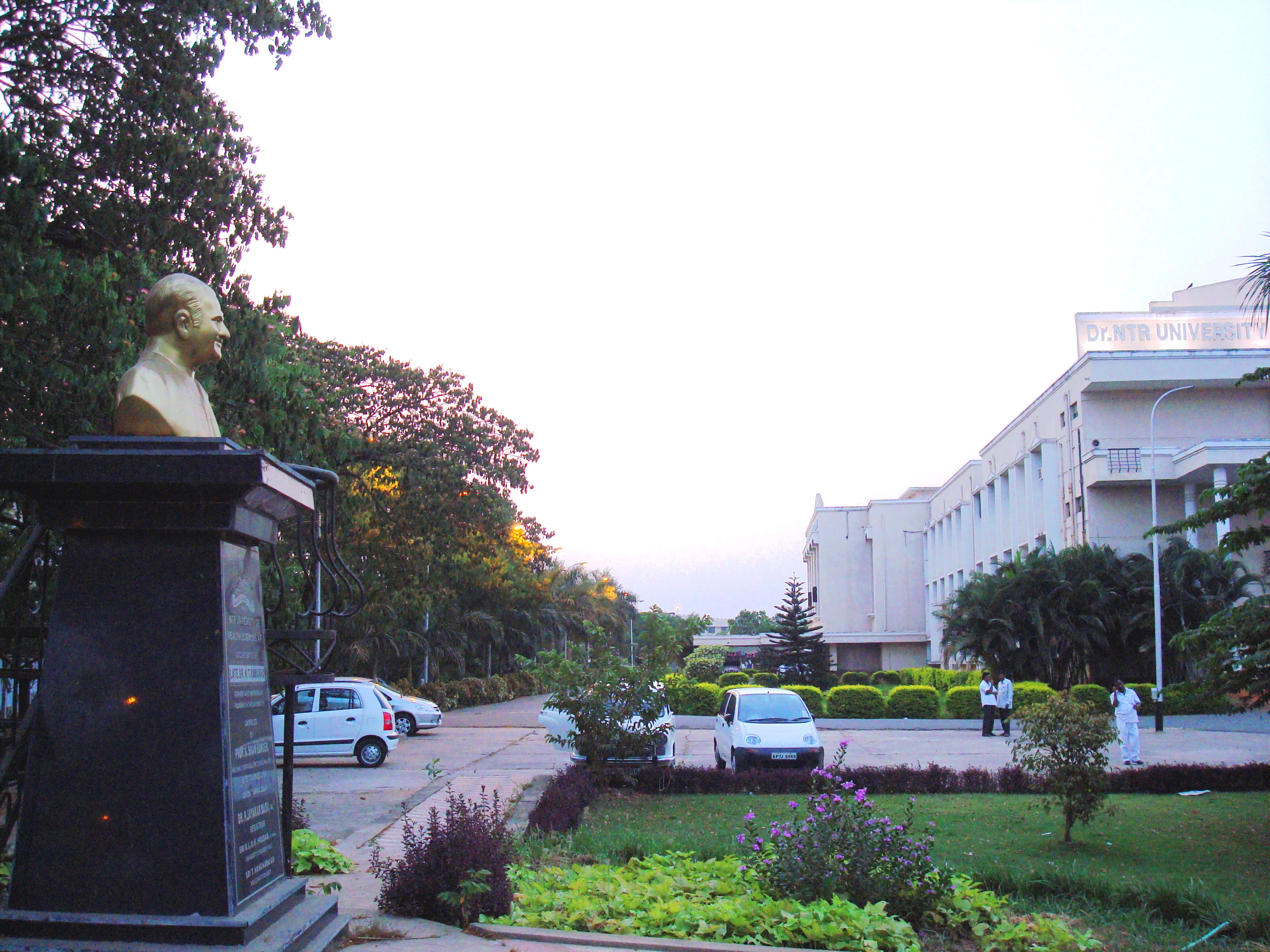
A statue in Dr. N.T.R. University of Health Sciences

In 2022, the then CM of Andhra Pradesh Y. S. Jagan Mohan Reddy has changed the university name to "Dr. YSR University of Health Sciences" after the former chief minister of Andhra Pradesh Dr. Y. S. Rajasekhara Reddy. Several protests were held by TDP leaders, NTR supporters, and activists against this change. The university's name was changed back to 'Dr. NTR University of Health Sciences' in July 2024.

== Facilities ==
There is a library and computer center where the library network is operated from. A guest house is available with different categories of accommodation. The examinations section is housed in a separate area where special security electronically controls access, which can only be gained by authorised staff and security officers. A biometric-based electronic attendance system has also been institutionally implemented.

== Admission and courses ==
Admission under the convener quota are based on applicants EAMCET rank for other allied paramedical courses and pharmaceutical courses and NEET (National Eligibility Entrance Test) rank for admission into MBBS and BDS Courses.

The university offers graduate, postgraduate, diploma, and super-specialty courses in modern medicine; dental surgery, nursing, Ayurveda, homoeopathy, and Unani; graduate degree courses in naturopathy, physiotherapy. Additionally, it offers a postgraduate (M.Sc.) course in applied nutrition.

The number of colleges affiliated with the university since its establishment has risen from 27 to 184. The degrees awarded by the university are recognised by professional statutory bodies, including the Medical Council of India, the Dental Council of India, the Central Council of Indian Medicine, the Central Council of Homoeopathy, and the Indian Nursing Council.

== Affiliated colleges and Institutes ==
=== Government colleges ===
- Andhra Medical College, Visakhapatnam
- Sri Venkateswara Medical College, Tirupati
- Government Medical College, Srikakulam
- Government Medical College, Anantapur
- Guntur Medical College, Guntur
- Kurnool Medical College, Kurnool
- Government Medical College, Ongole
- Government Medical College, Kadapa
- Rangaraya Medical College, Kakinada
- Siddhartha Medical College, Vijayawada
- A. C. Subba Reddy Government Medical College, Nellore
- SVIMS - Sri Padmavathi Medical College for Women, Tirupati
- Sri Venkateswara Institute of Medical Sciences, Tirupati
- Government Medical College, Vizianagaram
- Government Medical College, Rajamahendravaram
- Government Medical College, Eluru
- Government Medical College, Machilipatnam
- Government Medical College, Nandyala
- Government Medical College, Paderu

=== Private colleges ===
- Alluri Sitarama Raju Academy of Medical Sciences, Eluru
- Apollo Institute of Medical sciences and Research, Murukambattu, Chittoor
- Fatima Institute of Medical Sciences, Kadapa
- Gayatri Vidya Parishad Institute of Health Care and Medical Technology, Visakhapatnam
- GITAM Institute of Medical Sciences and Research (GIMSR), Visakhapatnam
- G.S.L. Medical College, Rajamahendravaram
- Great Eastern Medical School and Hospital, Srikakulam
- Katuri Medical College and Hospital, Guntur
- Konaseema Institute of Medical Sciences and Research Foundation, Amalapuram
- Maharaja Institute of Medical Sciences, Vizianagaram
- Narayana College of Nursing, Nellore
- Narayana Medical College, Nellore
- Nimra Institute of Medical Sciences, Ibrahimpatnam, Krishna district
- NRI Institute of Medical Sciences, Visakhapatnam
- NRI Medical College, Guntur
- P. B. Siddhartha College of Arts and Science, Vijayawada
- P.E.S. Institute of Medical Sciences and Research, Kuppam
- Dr. Pinnamaneni Siddhartha Institute of Medical Sciences and Research Foundation, Vijayawada
- Santhiram Medical College, Nandyal
- Viswabharathi Medical College, Kurnool
- Sri Balaji Medical College, Renigunta

=== Government Dental Colleges ===
- Government Dental College, Vijayawada
- Government Dental College and Hospital, Kadapa

=== Private Dental Colleges ===
- Vishnu Dental College, Bhimavaram, WG Dist.
- Anil Neerukonda Institute Of Dental Sciences, Visakhapatnam
- Sibar Institute of Dental Sciences, Takkellapadu, Guntur
- GITAM Dental College, Rushikonda, Visakhapatnam
- St.Joseph Dental College, Duggirala, Eluru, W.G.Dist
- Sree Sai Dental College Research Institute, Chapuram, Srikakulam.
- Drs.Sudha and Nageswara Rao Institute of Dental Sciences, Chinoutpalli, Krishna (Dist.)
- Lenora Institute of Dental Sciences, Rajamahendravaram(Non-Minority)
- GSL Dental College Hospital, NH-16, Lakshmipuram, Rajamahendravaram.
- Konaseema Institute of Dental Sciences, Amalapuram
- Care Dental College, Guntur, Pottur, NH5, Guntur
- CKS Teja Institute of Dental Sciences Research, Renigunta Road, Tirupathi
- Narayana Dental College, Chinthareddypalem, Nellore
- G. Pulla Reddy Dental College Hospital, Kurnool

== Publications ==
The university publishes the quarterly multi-disciplinary Journal of Dr. NTR University of Health Sciences, available both as a free, open-access journal online as well as in print. The first issue was published on 21 March 2012.

== Vice-chancellors ==
1. K. N. Rao (1986–1988)
2. L. Suryanarayana (1988–1994)
3. C. S. Bhaskaran (1994–1997)
4. G. Shamsunder (1997–2004)
5. R. Sambasiva Rao (2004–2007)
6. P. V. Ramesh (2007–2007)
7. A. V. Krishnam Raju (2007–2010)
8. I. V. Rao (2010–2014)
9. T. Ravi Raju (2014–2017)
10. C. V. Rao (2017–2019)
11. Pigilam Syama Prasad (2020–2023)
12. Korukonda Babji (2023–2024)
13. D. S. V. L. Narasimham (FAC) (2024–2025)
14. Pulala Chandrasekhar (2025–Incumbent)
