= Narasaraopeta Engineering College =

Engineering college for higher education in India

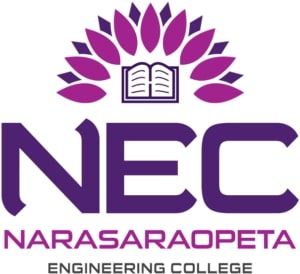
- Type: Private Autonomous Engineering College
- Established: 1998
- Principal: Dr. S. Venkateswarlu
- Location: Narasaraopet, Palnadu, Andhra Pradesh, India
- Campus: 48 Acres
- Website: www.nrtec.in

Narasaraopeta Engineering College is an engineering college for higher education in India, located in Narasaraopeta, Palnadu District, Andhra Pradesh, India. Established in 1998, NEC is an Autonomous Institution with permanent affiliation to JNTUK, Kakinada and is promoted and backed by Gayatri Educational Development Society (GEDS).

The institution is approved by the All India Council for Technical Education, New Delhi, and has been accredited by the National Board of Accreditation and National Assessment and Accreditation Council with ‘A+’ Grade. The college is certified with ISO 9001:2008 and got featured in NIRF top 300 Ranking in 2024.

== History ==
Narasaraopeta Engineering College known as NEC was established in 1998 by Gayatri Educational Development Society (GEDS) by Mr. Mittapalli Venkata Koteswara Rao, who is an influential philanthropist and industrialist in Palnadu District. NEC was the first technical education institution in the Palnadu Region of Palnadu district, Andhra Pradesh. In the last two decades, the institute has produced prominent engineers, bureaucrats, and leaders in the region. It has been the centre for innovation, research, and entrepreneurship.

At present, the college is run by a group of educationalists, technologists and industrialists. Mr. M.V.Koteswara Rao acts as the chairman of the college managing committee. Mr. Chakravarthi Mittapalli is the Vice Chairman and Director of NEC Group of Institutions, who looks after the transformations in engineering, technical and professional education. Mr. Chakravarthi has been acting as the key person behind the industry-institute collaboration. It is under his leadership that NEC has been selected for setting up Indo-European Skilling centres for Mechatronics and Industrial Robotics - in collaboration with APSSDC & Applied Robot Control, Germany.

== Campus ==
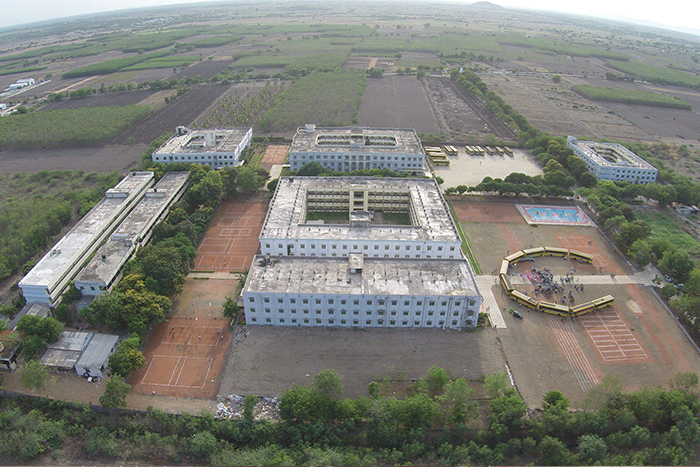
Campus, Narasaraopeta Engineering College

Narasaraopeta Engineering College campus spreads across 48 acres of land. It is 100 km away from Gannavaram airport. The campus consists of a central library, Hi-tech classrooms with digital projectors enabled to facilitate the students with E-learning, wifi-enabled computer labs, workshops-mechanical, civil, electrical.

Hostels are available for students (A.C & Non-A.C) and faculties along with a guest house, canteen, medical centre, indoor stadiums. The campus has a good cricket pitch of the central strip of the cricket field between the wickets. It is 22 yd (20.12 m) long (1 chain) and 10 ft (3.05 m) wide. The surface is flat and normally covered with extremely short grass. The campus also contains a good playground for athletics and various sports.

== Departments ==
NEC has 13 independent departments- Mechanical Engineering, Civil, Engineering, Computer Science and Engineering, Electronics

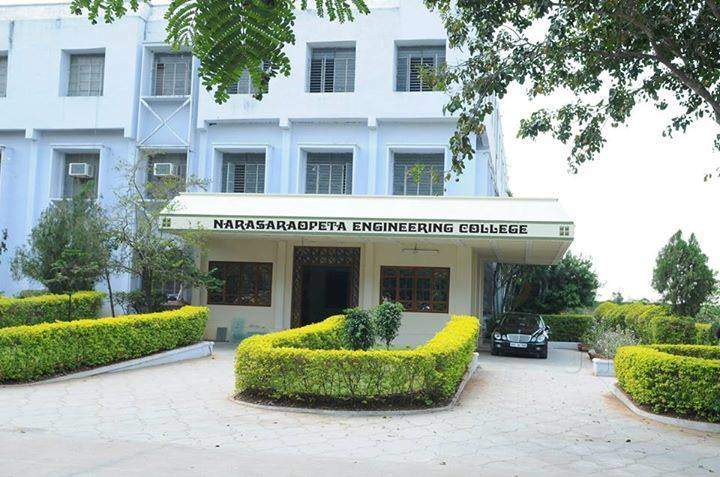
Main Building, Narasaraopeta Engineering College

and Communication Engineering, CSE in AI, CSE in AI & ML, CSE in Cyber Security, CSE in Data Science, Electrical and Electronics Engineering, Information Technology, Master of Business Administration, Master of Computer Applications, and Basic Sciences & Humanities. Each department has their individual blocks, Head of Departments and facilities.

== Student life ==
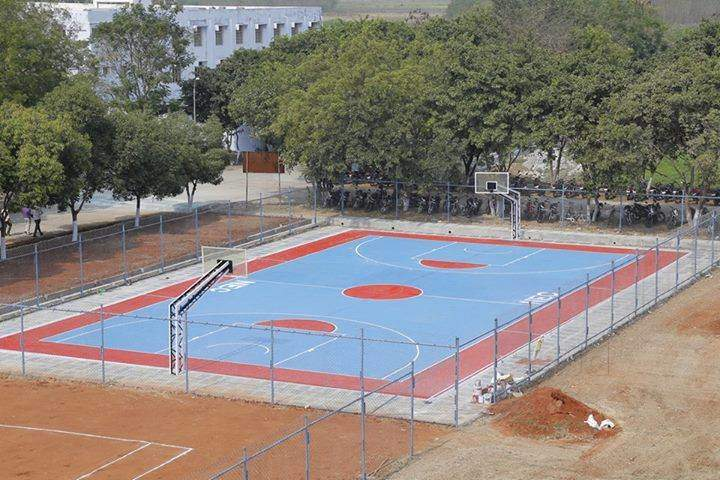
Basketball Court, Narasaraopeta Engineering College

NEC organises technical and cultural fest every year. The college consists of various student clubs like Photography, Shortfilms, Sports, and Cultural.

Sports events (indoor & outdoors) and cultural activities such as dancing, singing and drama takes place in the college from time to time Freshers and farewell parties are conducted for both students and faculty separately.

Students run a college radio station where interested students and teachers can participate.

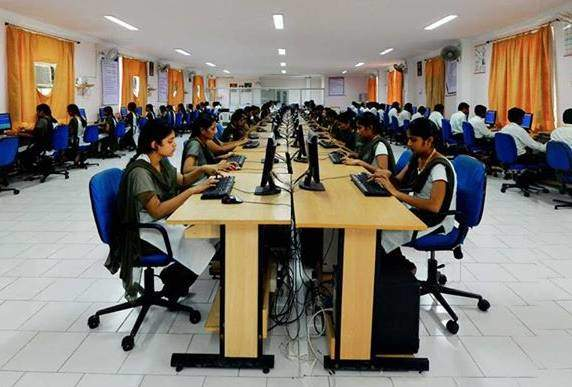
Computer Lab, Narasaraopeta Engineering College

== Rankings ==
University rankings

Engineering – India
- NIRF (2024): 201-300

The National Institutional Ranking Framework (NIRF) ranked the university between 201-300 in the engineering rankings in 2024.
