= Raghu Engineering College =

Engineering college in Andhra Pradesh, India

- Type: Autonomous
- Established: 2001
- Parent institution: Raghu Educational Institutions, Visakhapatnam
- Affiliations: JNTU-GV
- Chairman: Raghu Kalidindi
- Principal: Dr.Ch Srinivasu
- Faculty: 200
- Students: 3000+
- Location: Bheemunipatnam, Visakhapatnam, Andhra Pradesh, 531162, India
- Campus: 50 acres, suburb
- Language: English
- Nickname: REC
- Website: https://www.raghuenggcollege.com/

Raghu Engineering College (Autonomous) is an engineering college located in the outskirts of the city of Visakhapatnam, Andhra Pradesh, India. Established in 2001, it is situated on NH-43, 37 km away from Visakhapatnam and 15 km away from Vizianagaram. It is an AICTE, New Delhi approved engineering institution and is affiliated to Jawaharlal Nehru Technological University - Gurajada, Vizianagaram. The chairman is Kalidindi Raghu an academic.

The college is located in the suburbs of Dakamarri Village of Bheemunipatnam mandal in Visakhapatnam District. The 40-acre (160,000 m^{2}) campus of Raghu Engineering College is home to the infrastructure, faculty and support facilities. While providing an on-campus residence for students, the college has its own transport facility from Visakhapatnam, Vizianagaram and Bheemunipatnam for the day scholars.

Facilities include a library, computer labs for various purposes, separate CAM and CAD labs program guided machine operations and sports complex.

Raghu Engineering College Raghu institution of technology and Raghu college of pharmacy are situated in a same area and popularly called Raghu Educational institutions. The all over students are more than 7000+. Raghu Engineering College offers in streams like undergraduates in B.TECH and graduate in M.TECH.The intake of students in undergraduates as follows:
