= Kakaraparti Bhavanarayana College =

Autonomous higher education institution in Vijayawada, India

Coordinates: 16.5238°N 80.6124°E

Kakaraparti Bhavanarayana College (KBN or locally " KBN College”) is an autonomous, government-aided higher education institution located in Kothapeta, Vijayawada, Andhra Pradesh, India. Established in 1965, the college is affiliated with Krishna University and is managed by the Sri Kakaraparti Bhavanarayana and Hindu High Schools Committee, one of the oldest educational trusts in the region.

== History ==
KBN College was founded by philanthropist Kakaraparti Bhavanarayana. The foundation stone was laid on Nov. 6, 1964, by Sri Kasu Brahmananda Reddy, then-Chief Minister of Andhra Pradesh. The college commenced academic operations in June 1965

In May 2022, a blood donation camp at KBN College saw participation from over 500 students from Krishna, Guntur, and NTR districts. It was organized by the Youth Welfare Department with support from SRM University AP and other institutions.

== Education system ==
KBN College follows a semester-based academic calendar and implements the Choice-Based Credit System (CBCS) for its undergraduate and postgraduate programs. Teaching methods include classroom instruction, seminars, and digital learning. The college is affiliated with Krishna University, and admissions to postgraduate courses are based on entrance exams such as ICET and KRU-CET.

== Campus ==
The college campus spans 9.6 acres in an urban setting. The infrastructure has modern classrooms, science and computer laboratories, a seminar hall, administrative blocks, a digital learning center and department-specific facilities. Residential facilities include a girls' hostel with ward supervision, and the canteen provides food and refreshments for students and staff. The college provides student development through NCC, NSS and sports programs. It features a sports ground for kabaddi, kho-kho and athletics, and houses a gymnasium for fitness activities.

In 2015, KBN College, Vijayawada, secured the overall championship at Krishna Tarang by earning medals in 14 events, including creative categories.

== Library ==
The central library of KBN College provides academic resources to meet the curriculum and research needs of students and faculty. The digital library, part of the institution’s infrastructure, offers e-resources including e-journals, e-books and academic repositories. The UG & PG library has a shelving capacity of more than 56,900 books.

== Accreditation ==
KBN College was granted autonomous status by the University Grants Commission (UGC) in 2010. The college received an 'A' grade during the National Assessment and Accreditation Council (NAAC) accreditation cycle in 2013 and was re-accredited with an 'A++' grade in 2024. In 2016, it was recognized by the UGC as a College with Potential for Excellence (CPE). The institution was ranked 92nd among degree colleges in India by the National Institutional Ranking Framework (NIRF) in 2017. The college has introduced academic programs including a Bachelor of Science in Artificial Intelligence.

== Research ==
The college facilitates academic research through the Research and Publication Monitoring (RPM) Cell. The cell coordinates interdisciplinary research and faculty development activities, supported by funding from UGC and DST. Faculty are involved in both minor and major research projects. Dr. G. Krishnaveni, IQAC coordinator, also serves as Director of the RPM Cell and oversees research-related initiatives.

== Undergraduate Programmes ==
KBN College offers a diverse set of undergraduate (UG) programmes across science, commerce, and management disciplines:

=== Bachelor of Science (B.Sc.) ===
- B.Sc. Quantum Technology — First of its Kind Under Krishna University
- B.Sc. Data Science
- B.Sc. Computer Science
- B.Sc. Electronics
- B.Sc. Chemistry
- B.Sc. Artificial Intelligence & Machine Learning
- B.Sc. Mathematics
- B.Sc. Statistics
- B.Sc. Biotechnology

=== Bachelor of Business Administration (BBA) ===
- BBA (General)
- BBA (Business Analytics)

=== Bachelor of Commerce (B.Com.) ===
- B.Com. (Tax Procedures)
- B.Com. (Computer Applications)
- B.Com. (Logistics)

=== Bachelor of Computer Applications (BCA) ===
- BCA (Computer Applications)

== Postgraduate Programmes ==
KBN College offers a diverse set of postgraduate (PG) programmes across science and management disciplines:

=== Master of Computer Applications (MCA) ===
- MCA

=== Master of Business Administration (MBA) ===
- MBA

=== Master of Science (M.Sc.) ===
- M.Sc. Organic Chemistry
- M.Sc. Analytical Chemistry
- M.Sc. Data Science

== Placements and Student Support ==
In the academic year 2025–2026, the college recorded 745 placements, demonstrating strong placement performance. The achievement reflects structured training, recruitment initiatives, and industry engagement. Students also benefit from career guidance, skill development programmes, and merit-based scholarships.

== Notable alumni ==
- Suhas Pagolu is an Indian actor who works in Telugu films.
- Boyi Satya is a handball player from Andhra Pradesh. She plays for the Andhra Pradesh state team

== Awards ==
In January 2025, Vijayawada MP Kesineni Sivanath distributed sports kits to 67 schools during a program held at KBN College.

== Events ==
KBN College conducts academic and extracurricular events annually. Events such as Foundation Day, Independence Day, Republic Day, NSS Day, and National Science Day. The college also conducts a cultural event titled "Samskruti," which includes intercollegiate competitions in music, dance, literary activities, and drama.
