= Surampalem, Rajavommangi Mandal =

Village in Andhra Pradesh, India

Surampalem
- village
- Interactive map of Surampalem
- Location in Andhra Pradesh, India Surampalem (India)
- Coordinates: 17°34′22″N 82°13′48″E
- Country: India
- State: Andhra Pradesh
- District: Polavaram

Area
  - Total: 2 km^{2} (0.77 sq mi)

Population (2011)
  - Total: 528
  - Density: 233/km^{2} (600/sq mi)

Languages
  - Official: Telugu
- Time zone: UTC+5:30 (IST)
- Postal code: 533 446

Surampalem is a village in Rajavommangi Mandal, Polavaram district in the state of Andhra Pradesh in India.

== Geography ==
Surampalem is located at 17.3284°N 81.9046°E.

== Demographics ==
As of 2011 India census, Surampalem had a population of 528, out of which 250 were male and 278 were female. The population of children below 6 years of age was 12%. The literacy rate of the village was 42%.
