= Jawaharlal Nehru Technological University - Gurajada, Vizianagaram =

University in Andhra Pradesh

Coordinates: 18°08′59″N 83°22′33″E

Jawaharlal Nehru Technical University-Gurajada
- Type: Public
- Established: 12 January 2022
- Affiliations: UGC, NAAC
- Chancellor: Governor of Andhra Pradesh
- Vice-Chancellor: Vissakodeti Venkata Subba Rao
- Principal: R . Rajeshwara rao
- Faculty: 87
- Location: Dwarapudi, Vizianagaram, Andhra Pradesh, India
- Campus: Urban
- Nickname: JNTUGV
- Website: jntugv.edu.in

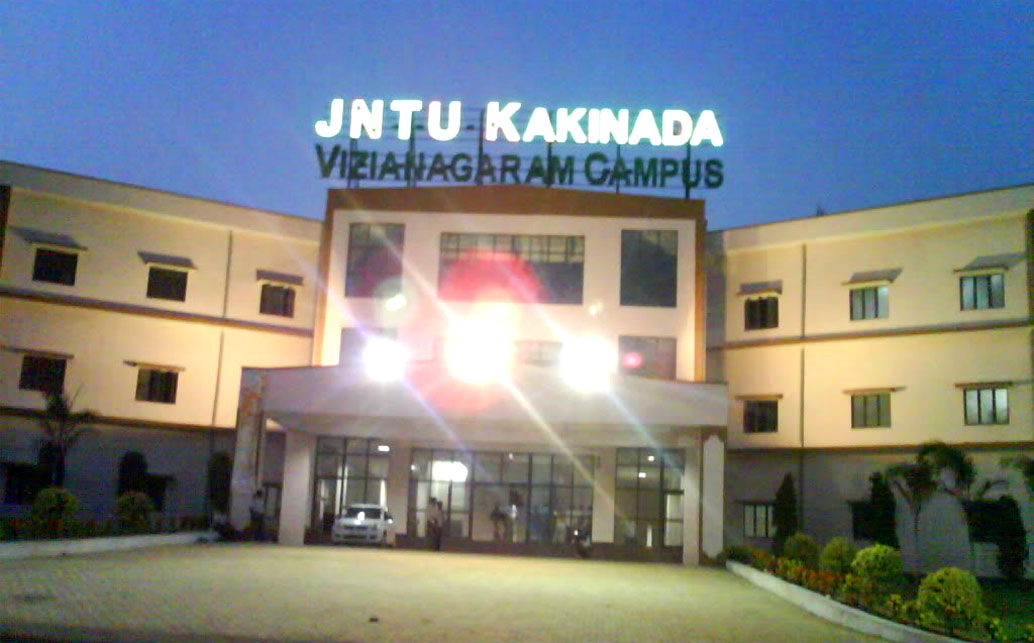
JNTU Vizianagaram in 2012

The Jawaharlal Nehru Technological University-Gurajada, Vizianagaram (JNTU-GV) is a public university located in Vizianagaram, Andhra Pradesh. It was established on 12 January 2022. The university was named after Gurajada Apparao, a noted Indian playwright, dramatist, poet, and writer known for his works in Telugu theatre. The university mainly focuses on engineering.

== History ==
The University College of Engineering Vizianagaram was established as a constituent college of Jawaharlal Nehru Technological University, Hyderabad in 2007. After the trifurcation of JNTU Hyderabad into three universities, the college has become the constituent college of Jawaharlal Nehru Technological University, Kakinada in 2008. On November 24, 2021 Government of Andhra Pradesh introduced a bill in the Andhra Pradesh Legislative Assembly to upgrade the college into an autonomous university. On 12 January 2022, the university was officially established, through the Jawaharlal Nehru Technological Universities (Amendment) Act, 2021.

=== Campus ===
The University is spread across an area of 80 acres (32 hectares) in Dwarapudi panchayat of Vizianagaram district. The territorial jurisdiction of the university comprises three erstwhile north coastal districts of Andhra Pradesh: Visakhapatnam, Vizianagaram and Srikakulam.

== Academics ==
The University consists of 7 engineering departments, offering 7 undergraduate engineering full-time programs and 8 postgraduate engineering programs.

=== Engineering departments ===
- Computer Science and Engineering
- Civil Engineering
- Electrical and Electronics Engineering
- Electronics and Communications Engineering
- Information Technology
- Mechanical Engineering
- Metallurgical Engineering

== Admission ==
Students are admitted into the undergraduate programs based on their score in the Engineering Agricultural and Pharmacy Common Entrance Test (AP EAPCET) conducted by the Government of Andhra Pradesh.

Students are admitted into postgraduate programs based on their Graduate Aptitude Test in Engineering (GATE) scores and rankings or their ranking in the Post Graduate Engineering Common Entrance Test (PGECET) conducted by the Government of Andhra Pradesh.
