= Lingam Venkata Prabhakar =

Indian banker and businessman

- Education: Institute of Banking & Finance
- Occupation: Banker
- Title: MD and CEO, Canara Bank
- Term: January 2020 – 31st December 2022
- Predecessor: R A Shankara Narayanan
- Successor: K. Satyanarayana Raju

Lingam Venkata Prabhakar is an Indian businessman. He was the Managing Director and CEO of Canara Bank. He was the former executive director of Punjab National Bank.

== Early life ==
Prabhakar did a master’s degree in agriculture. He is a Certified Associate of Indian Institute of Bankers (CAIIB). He did his graduation from Indian Institute of Banking and Finance.

== Career ==
Prabhakar started his career as Chief Risk Officer and GM-Integrated Risk management at Allahabad Bank. He joined Punjab National Bank on 1 March 2018 as the executive director. He became the Managing Director and CEO of Canara Bank from 1 February 2020 and continued to hold his position till 31 December 2022.
