= A. C. Subba Reddy Government Medical College =

Medical college in Andhra Pradesh, India

- Type: Public (Government medical college)
- Established: 2014; 12 years ago
- Academic affiliations: Dr. NTR University of Health Sciences
- Principal: Dr.G Rajeswari
- Undergraduates: 175 MBBS seats per year
- Postgraduates: 55
- Location: ACSR Government Medical College, Government Medical Hospital, Nellore, Andhra Pradesh 524004, Nellore, Andhra Pradesh, 524004, India; 14.427°N 79.963°E
- Campus: 67.5 acres (27.3 ha); Urban
- Recognition: National Medical Commission
- Website: https://acsrgmcnlr.com/
- Location within Andhra Pradesh Location within India

The A. C. Subba Reddy Government Medical College is located in Nellore district of Andhra Pradesh. It was established in 2014 with an intake capacity of 150 (MBBS seats) and later enhanced to 175 in 2019.It is affiliated to Dr. NTR University of Health Sciences. The college was named after Anam Chenchu Subba Reddy, a veteran leader and former Municipal Chairman of Nellore district.

== History ==
The DSR District Headquarters Hospital, Nellore was built during 1963 - 1968. Foundation Stone was laid by then Chief Minister of Andhra Pradesh Sri Neelam Sanjeeva Reddy. It was inaugurated on 18 December 1968 by then Chief Minister of Karnataka Sri Veerendra Patil and presided by then Chief Minister of Andhra Pradesh Sri Kasu Brahmananda Reddy.

== Campus ==
The campus is spread across 67.5 acres (27.3 ha). It consists of OP Block, IP Block, Maternity & Child Block and the Medical College. The MBBS Admissions started in this college since 2014. Since 2022, the college started taking up Post Graduate admissions.
