= Rajiv Gandhi University of Knowledge Technologies, Nuzvid =

University campus in Andhra Pradesh, India

Coordinates: 16.791°N 80.823°E

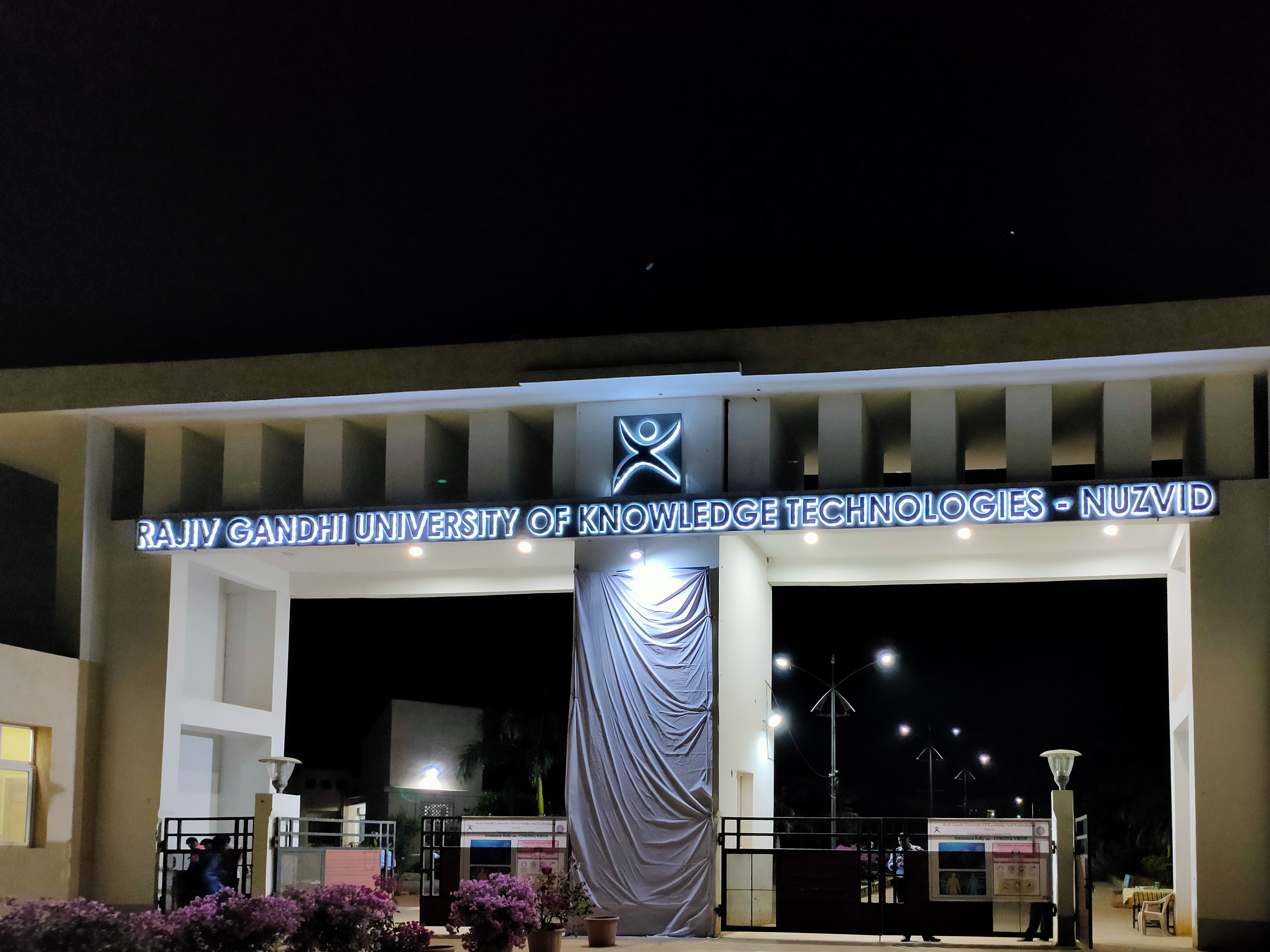
- Established: 2008
- Affiliations: UGC, AICTE
- Chancellor: Dr. Kotha Madhu Murthy
- Vice-Chancellor: Maddali Lakshmi Narayana Rao
- Location: Nuzvid, Andhra Pradesh, India
- Website: www.rgukt.in

Rajiv Gandhi University of Knowledge Technologies, Nuzvid (RGUKT-N) was founded as a Nuzvid, Krishna district campus of RGUKT, a state university by an act of the legislature by Andhra Pradesh government in 2008. Following the creation of Telangana, RGUKT is split and the Andhra Pradesh campuses are brought under RGUKT - Andhra Pradesh.

The primary objective is to provide high quality educational opportunities for the rural youth.

== Academics ==
The institute offers six-year Bachelor of Technology after 10th class examinations which includes two years pre-university course equivalent to intermediate degree followed by four year degree course in engineering course. It also offers postgraduate Master of Technology courses.

== Affiliation ==
The institute is affiliated to RGUKT Andhra Pradesh. RGUKT Nuzvid is approved by AICTE and the institution follows the norms and regulations of Government of India, University Grants Commission.

== Departments ==
- Biology
- Computer Science and Engineering
- Electronics and Communication Engineering
- Electrical Engineering
- Mechanical Engineering
- Civil Engineering
- Chemical Engineering
- Metallurgical and Materials Engineering
- Mathematics
- Physics
- Chemistry
- Telugu
- IT

== Culture and activities ==
The institute conducts various extra academic activities such as arts, vocal music, Kuchipudi dance, mridangam and yoga.
