= Lingam Suryanarayana =

Indian surgeon (born 1923)

Lingam Suryanarayana MBBS, MS, FACS (Telugu: లింగం సూర్యనారాయణ; born 16 May 1923) is an Indian surgeon from Andhra Pradesh. He has been the principal of Andhra and Guntur Medical Colleges and vice chancellor of Dr. NTR University of Health Sciences.

Suryanarayana received his M.B.B.S. degree in 1946 and an M.S. degree in general surgery in 1949 from Andhra Medical College, Visakhapatnam.

He worked as an assistant professor of surgery until 1964 and subsequently pursued further medical training in the United States, for one year. He then worked at Guntur Medical College as professor and head of the department of surgery. He was hospital superintendent there from 1968 to 1974 and became principal of the college in 1974. He then transferred to Visakhapatnam in 1974, becoming principal and head of the department of surgery of Andhra Medical College. In 1975, he was promoted to the position of additional director of medical education in Hyderabad, where he stayed until 1978.

His administrative capabilities took him to the post of pro vice chancellor of Andhra Pradesh University of Health Sciences in 1987, and he was vice chancellor from 22 February 1988 until 18 April 1994. As vice chancellor, he visited Japan, the US, Canada, Geneva, and Bangkok as a WHO participant.

He has been chairman of a number of workshops on medical education and health legislation and published numerous papers.

He is a lifetime member of the Indian Medical Association, the Association of Surgeons of India, and the Indian Association for Advancement of Medical Education. He is the founder of the Andhra Pradesh Chapter of the Association of Surgeons of India, a Fellow of the American College of Surgeons and the International College of Surgeons, and an Honorary Fellow of the International Medical Sciences Academy.

Suryanarayana actively contributes his services through various organizations. He has been secretary, president, and Zonal Chairman of Lions Club of Visakhapatnam and Guntur.

== Awards ==
- He is recipient of Vijaya Shri Award, Distinguished Scientist of India Award and Surgeon of Eminence Award.
- He was awarded Honorary doctorate (Doctor of Science) by the Dr. NTR University of Health Sciences on its seventh convocation in 2003.

== Publications ==
- L. Suryanarayana, K. Vembu, R. Rajalakshmi and C. Satyanarayana:Performance of National Tuberculosis Programme, 1993:an appraisal, Indian Journal of Tuberculosis., 1995, 42, 121.
- Suryanarayan, L. and Jagannatha, P.S. (2001) Scoring method for diagnosis of tuberculosis in children: an evaluation. Indian Journal of Tuberculosis, 48. pp. 101–103.
