= Government Medical College, Srikakulam =

Medical college in Andhra Pradesh, India

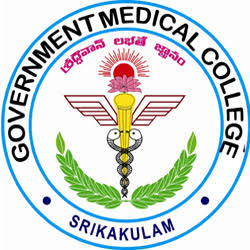
- Type: Government Institution
- Established: 2008; 18 years ago
- Affiliations: Dr. NTR University of Health Sciences, NMC
- Principal: Dr. S. Appala Naidu (MD, FIPHA)
- Dean: Dr. Shivraj Pandian
- Undergraduates: 200 per year
- Location: Srikakulam, Andhra Pradesh, India; 18.31433°N 83.88860°E
- Campus: Urban
- Website: Official website

The Government Medical College, Srikakulam (formerly known as Rajiv Gandhi Institute of Medical Sciences) is a medical college located in Srikakulam, Andhra Pradesh, India. It is affiliated to Dr. NTR University of Health Sciences. It is one of the two government medical colleges in Uttarandhra region.

== History ==
The institute was inaugurated by then Chief Minister Dr. Y. S. Rajasekhar Reddy. The name Rajiv Gandhi Institute of Medical Sciences, Srikakulam has been converted to Government Medical College, Srikakulam. Hence the post of 'Director' has been changed to 'Principal'.

== Departments ==
The Government Medical College, Srikakulam hosts a diverse range of departments as per NMC requirements, categorized into Pre-Clinical, Para-Clinical, and Clinical disciplines. These departments are designed to deliver medical education, training, and patient care.

Departments at GMC Srikakulam
| Category | Departments |
|---|---|
| Pre-Clinical | Anatomy; Physiology; Biochemistry |
| Para-Clinical | Pharmacology; Pathology; Microbiology; Forensic Medicine and Toxicology; Community Medicine |
| Clinical | General Medicine; General Surgery; Pediatrics; Obstetrics and Gynecology; Orthopedics; Ophthalmology; Otorhinolaryngology (ENT); Dermatology, Venereology, and Leprosy; Psychiatry; Anesthesiology; Radiology |
| Super-Specialty | Cardiology; Neurology; Nephrology |

== Campus ==
Campus Overview of Government Medical College, Srikakulam
| Feature | Description |
|---|---|
| Location | Located in Srikakulam, Andhra Pradesh, with good connectivity to nearby areas. |
| Academic Facilities | Academic block with lecture halls, seminar rooms, and advanced laboratories. |
| Teaching Hospital | Multi-specialty hospital providing healthcare services and clinical training for students. |
| Library | Well-stocked library with books, journals, and digital resources for research. |
| Hostels | Separate hostels for male and female students with dining and recreational facilities. |
| Sports & Recreation | Sports grounds, indoor game areas, and a gymnasium for students. |
| Auditorium | Fully equipped auditorium for seminars, conferences, and cultural events. |
| Amenities | Cafeteria, bank, ATMs, and medical store on campus. |
| Environmental Initiatives | Eco-friendly measures like rainwater harvesting, solar energy, and waste management systems. |
| Community Services | Health camps and awareness programs for rural and underserved areas. |
| Future Plans | Expansion of research facilities, hospital capacity, and academic infrastructure. |

== Intake ==
The institute initially started with an intake capacity of 100 (MBBS seats). It was increased to 150 in year 2019 and then 200 from the academic year 2024-25. It also began planning to start PG courses with an intake of 11 from the academic year 2019-20.

These are the batch names of the college from 2008 onwards.

| Academic Year | Name of the Batch | No. Of students |
|---|---|---|
| 2008 | Serene Stalwarts | 100 |
| 2009 | Celestial Annexers | 100 |
| 2010 | Xeneaver Staunches | 100 |
| 2011 | Relagicans Genegens | 100 |
| 2012 | Elixir Excelsiors | 100 |
| 2013 | Ryzentronz Veronicans | 100 |
| 2014 | Zenolant Xantronz | 100 |
| 2015 | Adroit Zenforians | 100 |
| 2016 | Troezianz Dravencores | 100 |
| 2017 | Xorticanz Thersanders | 100 |
| 2018 | Sanatores Krenoviantz | 100 |
| 2019 | Invictus Zeustallions | 150 |
| 2020 | Zentaurianz Curanderos | 150 |
| 2021 | Spartan Rovenzers | 150 |
| 2022 | Alessandros winxiderz | 150 |
| 2023 | Zavian Salvatores | 150 |
| 2024 | Exorian Dravergonz | 200 |

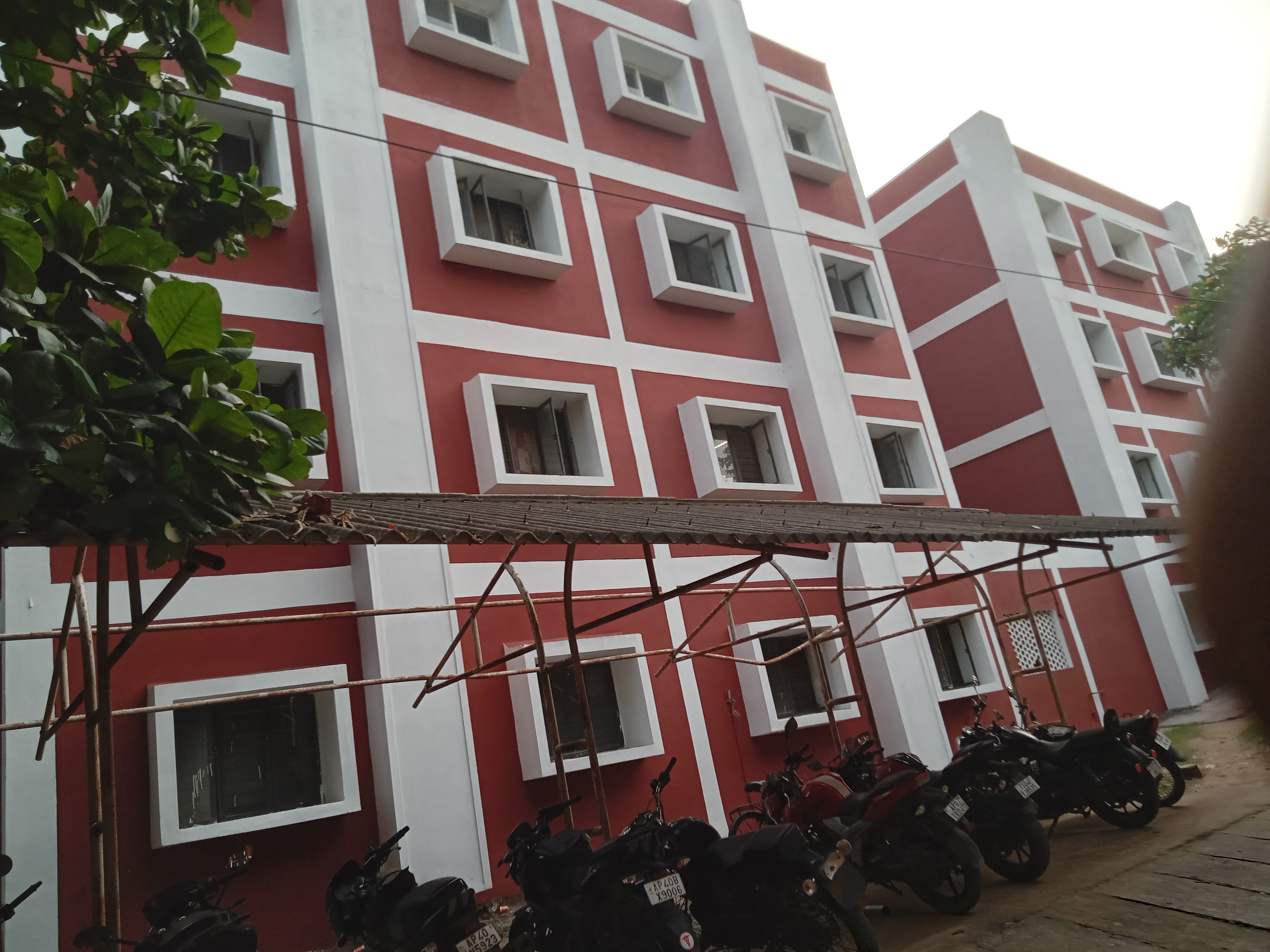
Boys hostel

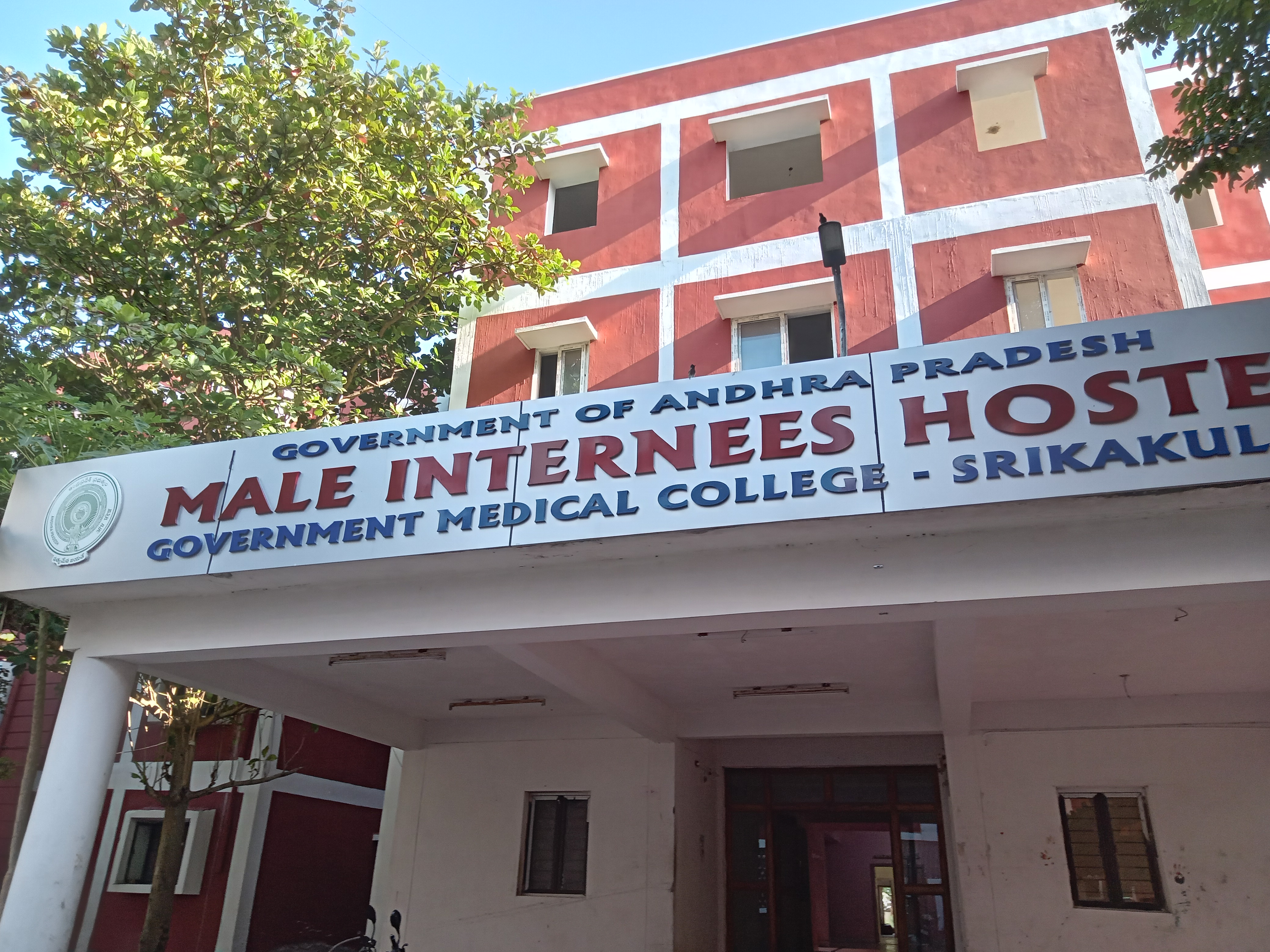
Male internees hostel

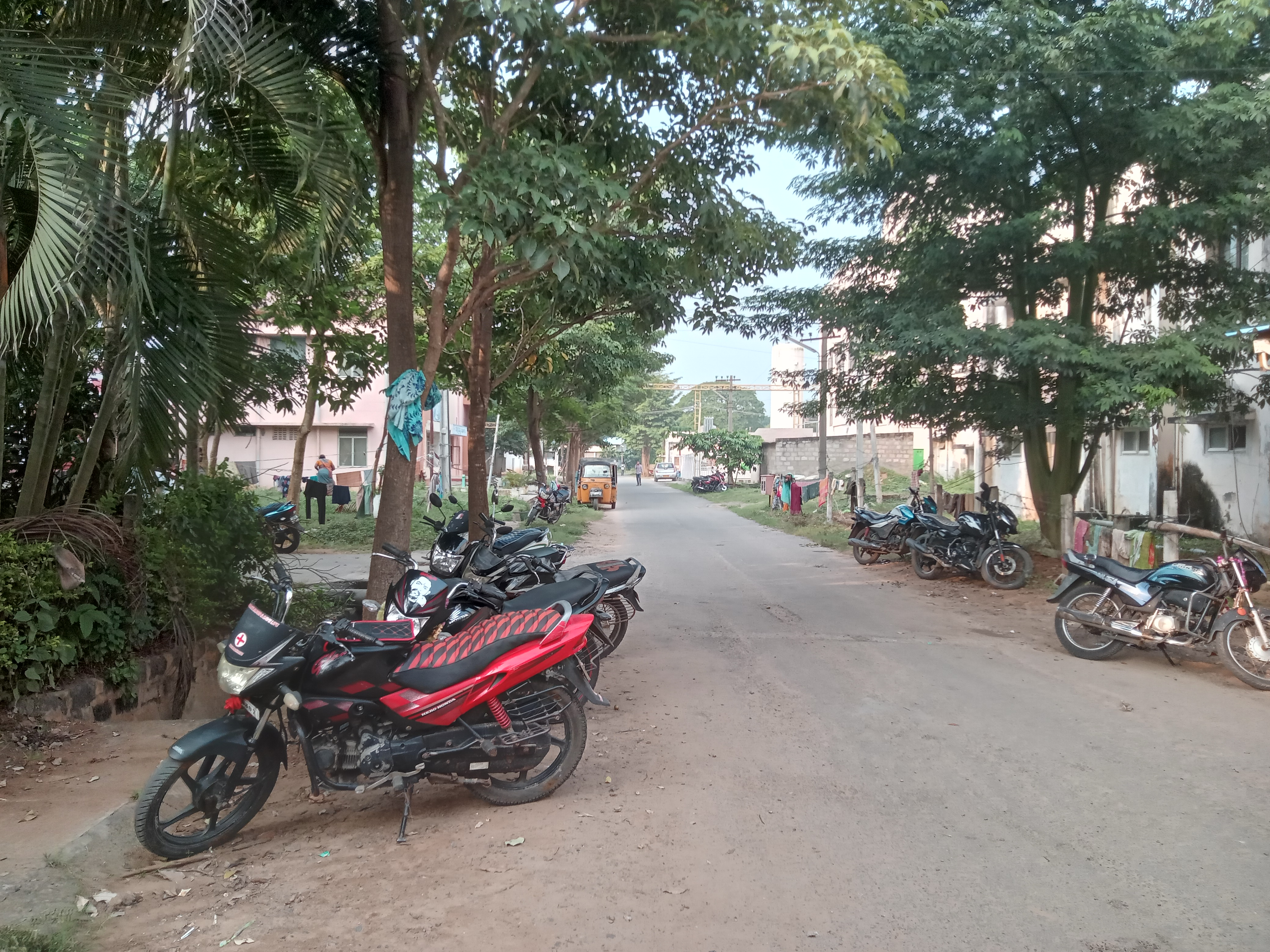
Image gallery 1

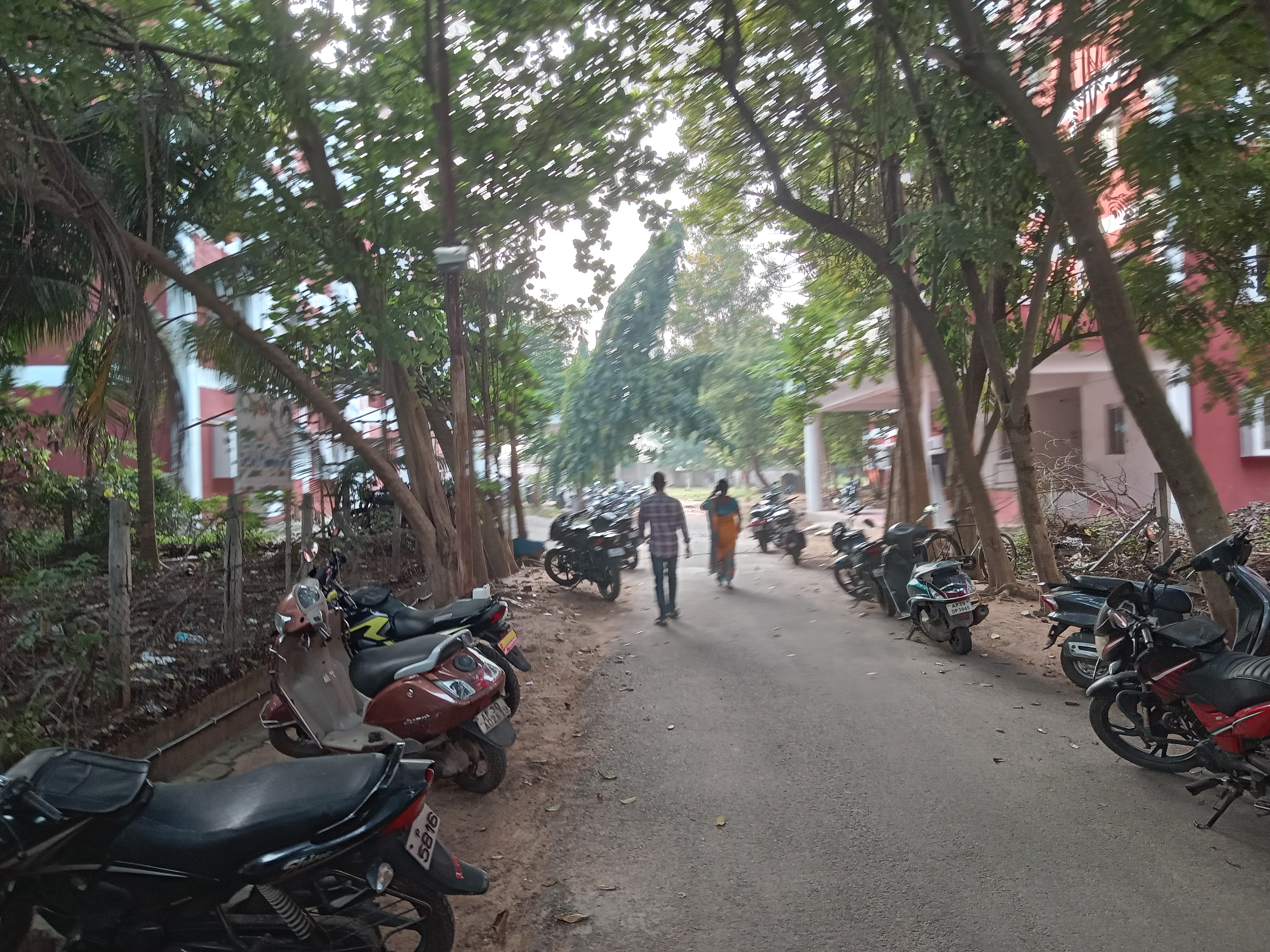
Image gallery 2
