= Government Medical College, Ongole =

Government Medical College

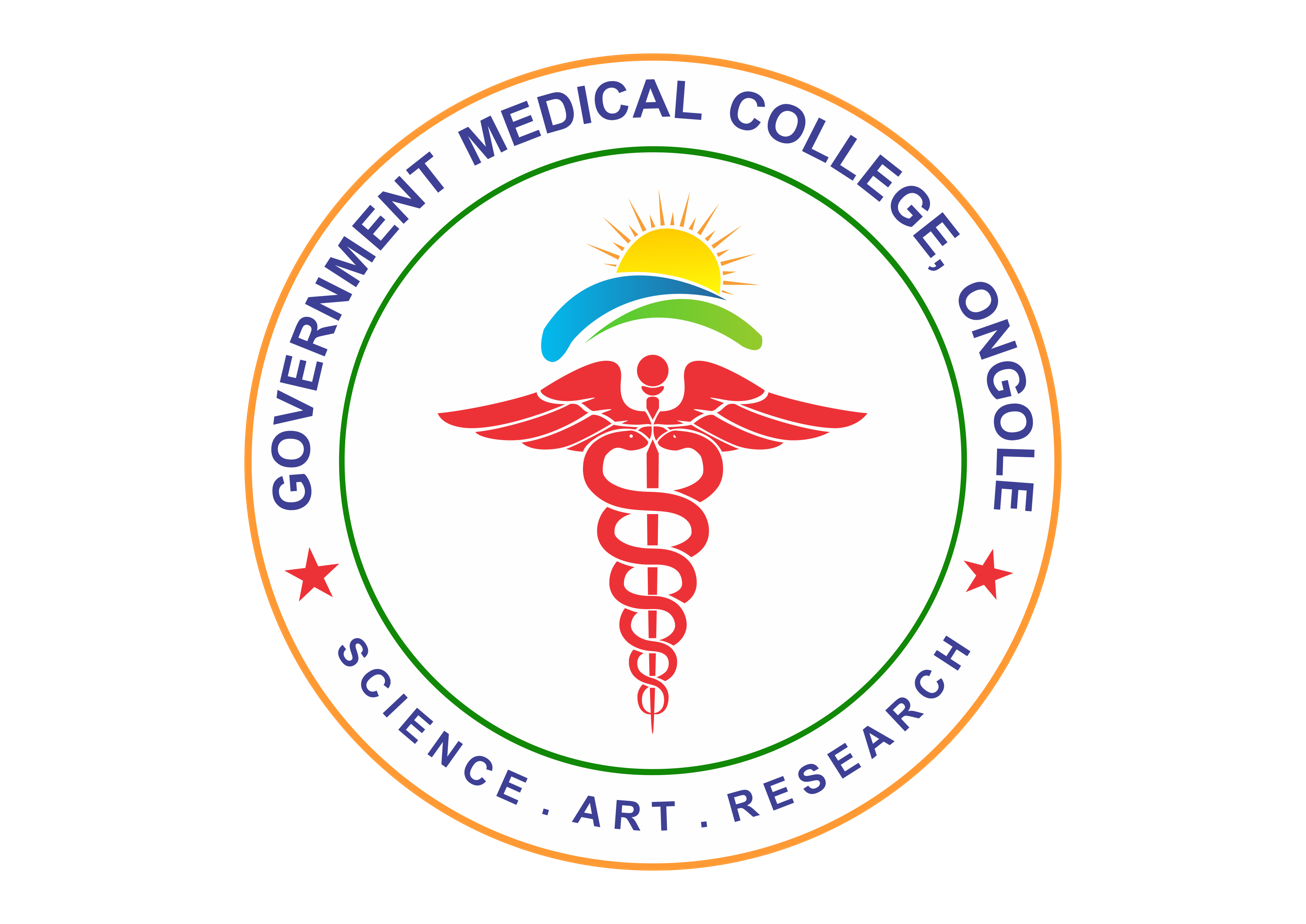
- Motto: Science, Art, Research
- Type: Medical Education and Research Institution
- Established: 2008; 18 years ago
- Affiliations: NMC; DCI
- Academic affiliations: NTR University of Health Sciences
- Principal: Dr. S. Shivani
- Location: Ongole, Andhra Pradesh, India; 15°29′11″N 80°02′46″E
- Campus: Urban
- Website: www.gmcongole.org

Government Medical College (formerly known as Rajiv Gandhi Institute of Medical Sciences) is a medical institute located in Ongole, Andhra Pradesh. It is affiliated to Dr. NTR University of Health Sciences.

== Intake ==
The present intake is 150 M.B.B.S seats

The college offers postgraduation courses in 19 departments with annual intake of 99 postgraduates. MD Physiology 4 MD BioChemistry 2 MD Pathology 9 MD Microbiology 4 MD Pharmacology 4 MD Community Medicine 7 MD Forensic Medicine 2 MS ENT 5 MS Ophthalmology 5 MD General Medicine 6 MD DVL 2 MD Psychiatry 2 MS General Surgery 11 MD Anesthesiology 7 MS Orthopaedics 7 MD Radio-Diagnosis 5 MD Respiratory Medicine 1

MD Paediatrics 7

MS Obstetrics & Gynecology 9
