= Aditya Institute of Technology and Management =

College in Andhra Pradesh, India

Aditya Institute of Technology and Management Engineering College
- Motto in English: "Integrated Approach in Technology and Management Education"
- Type: Private Engineering College
- Established: 2001
- President: K. Someswara Rao, MD, DCH
- Principal: A.S. Srinivasa Rao
- Director: V.V. Nageswara Rao
- Academic staff: 213
- Administrative staff: 247
- Students: 3,756
- Undergraduates: 2,825
- Postgraduates: 151
- Location: K. Kotturu, Tekkali, Srikakulam(Dist), Andhra Pradesh-532201, India; 18°33′58″N 84°11′47″E^{a} Autonomous College. Note: This is Autonomous College.
- Campus: Urban (Main campus) 45 acres (18 ha)
- Colours: Red and black
- Nickname: AITAM College
- Website: www.adityatekkali.edu.in

Aditya Institute of Technology and Management (AITAM College) is an Engineering and Management college located in Tekkali, Srikakulam District of Andhra Pradesh State. The college was established in 2001.

AITAM offers six undergraduate and post graduate programs in varied disciplines like IT, CSE, Mechanical, Civil, Electronics, and Electrical Engineering.

== Departments ==
=== Undergraduate courses ===
- CSD
- Civil Engineering
- Computer Science and Engineering
- Electronics and Communication Engineering
- Electrical Engineering
- Information Technology
- Mechanical Engineering
- Computer Science and Business Systems
- CSM
- BBA(Bachelor of Business Administration)
- BCA(Bachelor of Computer Applications)

=== M.Tech courses ===
- Computer Science & Engineering(CSE)
- Power Systems (Electrical Engineering)
- Structural engineering (Civil Engineering)
- Machine Design(Mechanical Engineering)
- Communication Engineering & Signal Processing(ECE)
- Computer Science & Technology (CST)
- MCA (Master of Computer Applications)
- MBA (Master of Business Administration)

== History ==
This engineering and management institute dates back to 2001.

== Rankings ==
University rankings

Engineering – India
- NIRF (2024): 201-300

The National Institutional Ranking Framework (NIRF) ranked the college between 201-300 in the engineering rankings in 2024.

== Infrastructure ==
The campus is on 50 acres of land.

Table 1: Descriptive Statistics (2020)
Item	Value
TOTAL BUILT UP AREA	25,349 Sq.m
NO.OF CLASSROOMS	49
NO.OF SEMINAR HALLS	3
NO.OF LABORATORIES	74
