= Chilakapalem =

- Village
- Interactive map of Chilakapalem
- Location in Andhra Pradesh, India Chilakapalem (India)
- Coordinates: 18.271°N 83.804°E
- Country: India
- State: Andhra Pradesh
- District: Srikakulam district

Population (2011)
  - Total: 6,162

Languages
  - Official: Telugu
- Time zone: UTC+5:30 (IST)
- Vehicle Registration: AP30 (Former); AP39 (from 30 January 2019)

Chilakapalem is a village in Etcherla mandal, located in Srikakulam district of the Indian state of Andhra Pradesh.
