= Boyi Satya =

Handball player from India

Boyi Satya (born 2 August 2007) is a handball player from Andhra Pradesh. She plays for the Andhra Pradesh state team.

== Early life and education ==
Satya is from a village near Vijayawada, Krishna district, Andhra Pradesh. She is born to Boyi Kanaka Raju and Boyi Adilakshmi. Her father Raju has supported her despite his family and friends advising him not to send a girl outstation. She younger sister, Roshni Teja, is studying intermediate. She is studying second year BCom specialising in Taxation and Procedures at Kakaraparti Bhavanarayana College (KBN), Vijayawada. She joined the sports hostel run by the Sports Authority of Andhra Pradesh in Mylavaram in her fifth class.

== Career ==
She represented Andhra Pradesh in eight National Handball Championships organised under the aegis of Handball Federation of India and Handball Association of India. She started playing handball in Class 7. At KBN college, she trains under Physical Education director Hemachandra Rao.

In 2019, Satya represented the state for the first time and was part of the team that played in the Sub-Junior Nationals held in Uttarakhand. In 2021, she played for Andhra Pradesh in the Junior Nationals at Uttar Pradesh and was also in the team that played the Khelo India Nationals at Haryana in the same year. In 2023 and 2024, she played the under-19 Nationals in Delhi and Haryana respectively.

She represented the Acharya Nagarjuna University in the South Zone Inter-University tournament held at Tamil Nadu in 2025 before playing the 47th Junior Nationals in Uttar Pradesh. In 2025, she was also part of the senior Andhra Pradesh team and played in the 53rd Senior Nationals at Agra.

=== Awards ===
Satya received the 'Best Female Sportsperson award' from chief minister Chandrababu Naidu for 2025 on the occasion of Women's Day.
