= QIS College of Engineering and Technology =

College in Andhra Pradesh

QIS College of Engineering and Technology is located in Vengamukkapalem, Ongole, Andhra Pradesh. It was established in 1998 by The Nidamanuri Educational Society. The college is affiliated with JNTU, Kakinada. "This Is The First Engineering Autonomous College in Prakasam district".

The college offers undergraduate Courses like Bachelor of Technology programmes for mechanical engineering(ME), electrical and electronics engineering(EEE), electronics and communications engineering(ECE), Computer Science and Engineering (CSE), Civil Engineering (CE) and Information Technology(IT).

Also offered are programmes for Master of Technology, Master of Business Administration, and Master in Computer Applications.
