= Andhra Pradesh Residential Degree College =

Location
- Nagarjuna Sagar, Vigayapuri South, Guntur (Dist), Andhra Pradesh, India; 16.561226°N 79.310891°E

Information
- Type: Mens College, Commerce, arts & science college
- Established: 1 September 1982
- Enrollment: 152 (in 2014)
- Affiliations: Acharya Nagarjuna University

The Andhra Pradesh Residential Degree College (APRDC) is a college in Vijayapuri South, Nagarjunasagar. It was established as an initiative taken by the Chief Minister Sri Bhavanam Venkatarami Reddy in 1982 by the government of Andhra Pradesh. This was under the management of the Andhra Pradesh Residential Educational Society, in Hyderabad.

It provides free boarding and hostel facilities and free education with the aid of Government. of Andhra Pradesh. This college is affiliated with Acharya Nagarjuna University.

The college also offers library and laboratory facilities. A unique feature of the college is the loco-parent system, in which batches of 20 students are allotted to a lecturer, called a loco-parent. The loco parent will supervise the overall welfare of his ward, including academic and health, career guidance, and counseling, with the help of alums.

Course & Specialization

BCom-Bachelor of Commerce, B.Sc.-Bachelor of Science, BA-Bachelor of Arts
