= S.T.S.N. Government Degree College, Kadiri =

Public college in Kadiri, India

- ఎస్.టి.ఎస్.ఎన్. ప్రభుత్వ డిగ్రీ కళాశాల, కదిరి
- Type: Public, Co-educational
- Established: 1975
- Affiliations: Sri Krishnadevaraya University, Anantapur
- Principal: Salim Basha
- Location: Kadiri, Sri Sathya Sai district, Andhra Pradesh, India; 14.1274°N 78.1538°E
- Campus: Urban (26.92 acres)
- Website: www.stsngdckadiri.ac.in

S.T.S.N. Government Degree College (Sri Thayi Suryanarayana Government Degree College) is a government higher education institution located in the historical town of Kadiri in Sri Sathya Sai district, Andhra Pradesh, India. The college was established in 1975. It is affiliated to Sri Krishnadevaraya University (SKU), Anantapur.

== History ==
The college was started in 1975 with the aim of providing higher education to the rural and backward students of Kadiri and its surrounding areas. The college was named S.T.S.N. (STSN) Government Degree College in memory of the donor, Sri Thayi Suryanarayana. Currently, the college has a sprawling campus of 26.92 acres located in the Saidapuram area, near the Kadiri RTC Bus Stand. The college has been accredited with a 'B' grade by the National Assessment and Accreditation Council (NAAC).

== Academic courses ==
The college offers the following courses at the Undergraduate (UG) and Postgraduate (PG) levels:

=== Bachelor of Arts (B.A.) ===
- History, Economics, Political Science (HEP)
- History, Political Science, Advanced Telugu
- History, Political Science, Urdu

=== Bachelor of Commerce (B.Com) ===
- B.Com (General)
- B.Com (Computer Applications)

=== Bachelor of Science (B.Sc) ===
- Mathematics, Physics, Computer Science (MPCs)
- Chemistry, Zoology, Sericulture
- Botany, Zoology, Chemistry (BZC)
- Chemistry, Zoology, Statistics

=== Postgraduate courses (P.G.) ===
- M.Sc (Sericulture)
- M.Com (Master of Commerce)

== Facilities and special features ==
- Jawahar Knowledge Centre (JKC): Prepares students for campus placements by providing training in employability skills, soft skills, and computer skills.
- Digital Classrooms: Smart classrooms equipped with modern technology and computer labs are available here.
- Library: A well-equipped library with books and journals related to various subjects.
- Sports: A spacious playground, gymnasium, and indoor sports facilities are available for the physical fitness of the students.
- This is the only college in the state of Andhra Pradesh that offers a Sericulture course.

== Admissions ==
First-year degree admissions in this college are based on merit in Intermediate marks through the OAMDC (Online Admissions Module for Degree Colleges) online counseling process conducted by the Andhra Pradesh State Council of Higher Education (APSCHE). Admissions to PG courses are conducted through AP PGCET.
