= Government Medical College, Anantapur =

Medical institute in India

Government Medical College, Anantapuramu
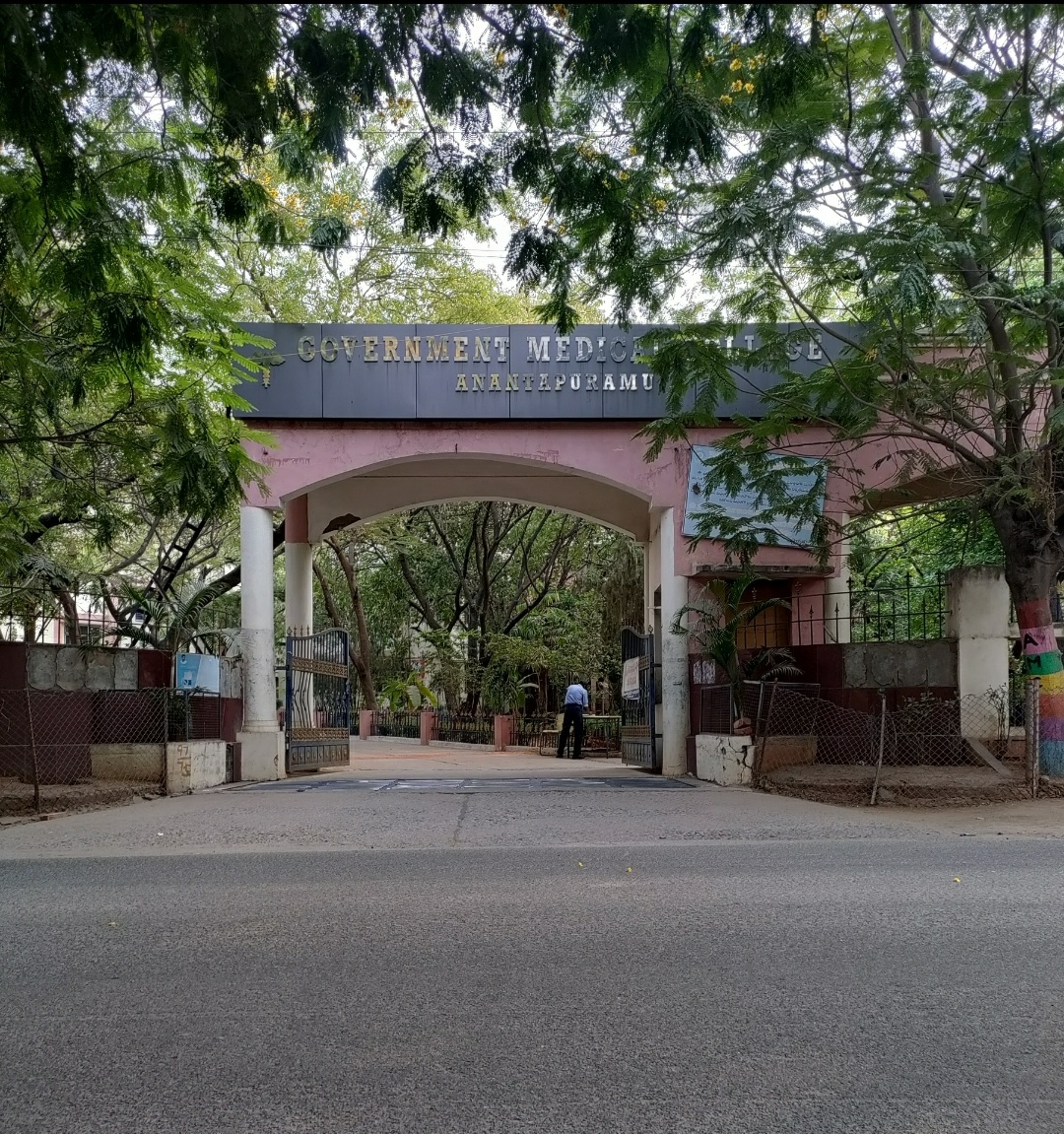
- GMC ATP Front Gate
- Other name: GMC ATP
- Former names: Rajiv Gandhi Institute of Medical Science, Anantapuramu
- Type: Medical Education
- Established: April 4, 2000; 26 years ago
- Academic affiliations: Dr. NTR University of Health Sciences, NMC
- Principal: Dr.M.Vijayasree
- Undergraduates: 200 MBBS seats
- Postgraduates: 13 PG Courses
- Location: Anantapuramu, Andhra Pradesh, India
- Campus: Urban
- Website: https://www.gmc-atp.in

Government Medical College, Anantapur is a public medical college in Anantapuramu, Andhra Pradesh, India. It is affiliated to Dr. NTR University of Health Sciences. A government general hospital is attached to the medical college. The college and hospital are approved and recognised by the National Medical Commission. The first batch of 100 medical undergraduate students started on 4 April 2001.
