= Nuzvid =

- Town
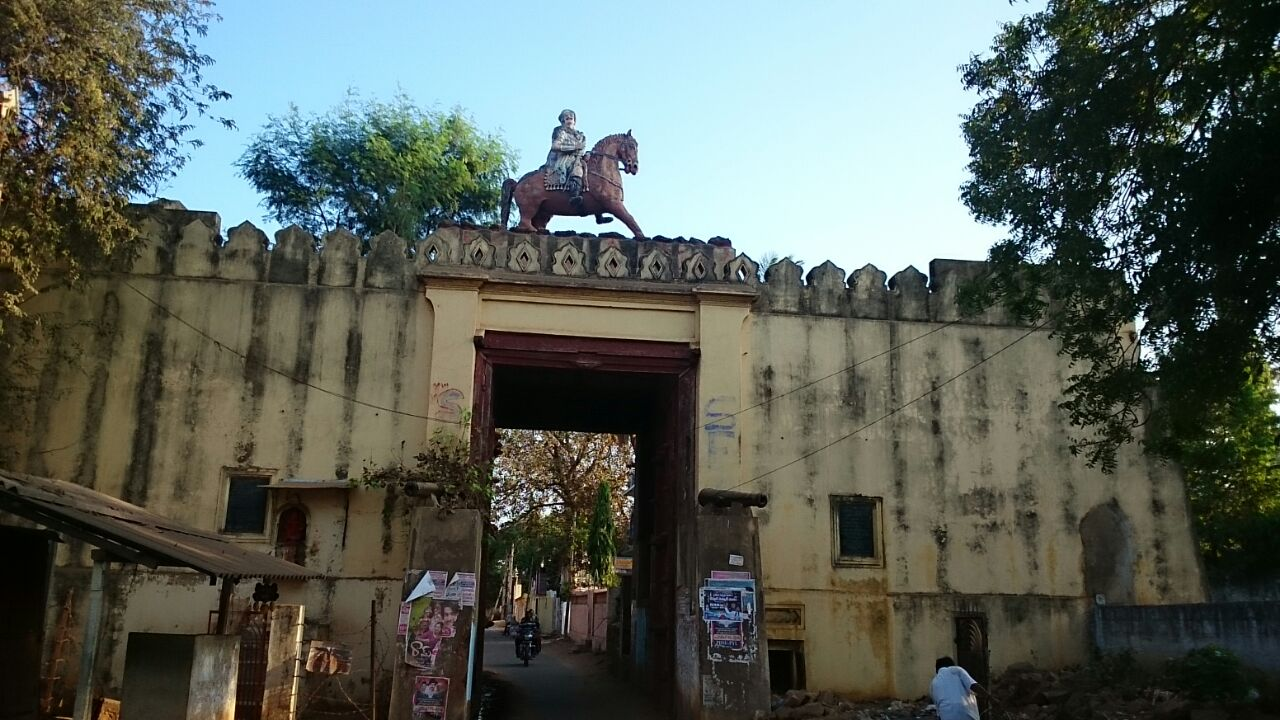
- Nuzvid Fort Gate

- Location in Andhra Pradesh, India
- Coordinates: 16.7881°N 80.8465°E
- Country: India
- State: Andhra Pradesh
- District: Eluru
- Mandal: Nuzvid

Government
  - Type: Municipality
  - Body: Nuziveedu Municipality
  - MLA: Kolusu Partha Sarathi // TDP

Area
  - Total: 8.69 km^{2} (3.36 sq mi)
- Elevation: 81 m (266 ft)

Population (2014)
  - Total: 148,590
  - Density: 17,100/km^{2} (44,300/sq mi)

Languages = Telugu
- Time zone: UTC+5:30 (IST)
- Vehicle registration: AP 39
- Lok Sabha constituency: Eluru
- Assembly constituency: Nuzvid
- Website: www.nuzvidthemangocity.com

Nuzvid, natively spelled Nuzividu or Nuziveedu is a town in the Eluru district of the Indian state of Andhra Pradesh. It serves as the administrative headquarters for Nuzvid mandal and Nuzvid revenue division.

== Geography ==
Nuzvid is located at 16.7881°N 80.8465°E. It has an average elevation of 81 m (266 ft).

== Demographics ==
As of 2014 Census of India, the town had a population of 132,590. There were 66,117 males and 66,473 females — a sex ratio of 1012 females per 1000 males, higher than the national average of 940 per 1000. 5,213 children are in the age group of 0–6 years, of which 2,606 are boys and 2,607 are girls—a ratio of 1000 per 1000. The average literacy rate stands at 82.37%, significantly higher than the national average of 73.00%.

== Governance ==
Civic administration

Nuzvid municipality is the civic body of the town. It is a I–Grade Municipality, which was constituted in the year 1983. It is spread over an area of 28.69 km^{2} (11.08 mi^{2}) and has 32 election wards.

== Economy ==
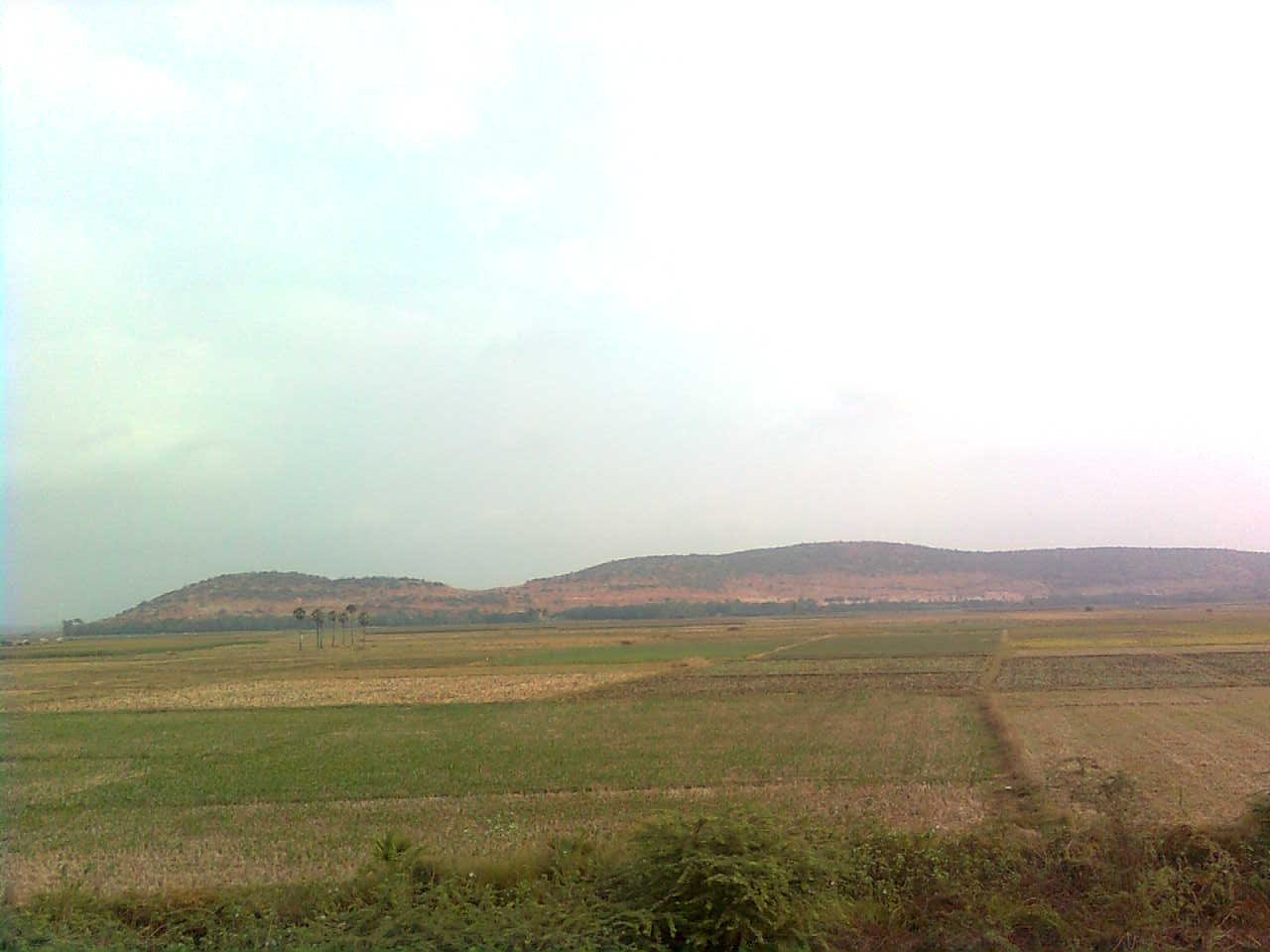
Fields near Nuzvid

The Mango orchards are in abundance with Chinna rasalu, Banginapalli, Totapuri varieties, those are even exported to foreign countries. It even generates revenue for Vijayawada railway division of South Central Railway zone, in terms of freight loading. In the year, 2009–10, 34,314 tonnes of mangoes were loaded to generate an income of ₹5.12 crore (US$530,000).

== Transport ==
The town has a total road length of 153.60 km (95.44 mi). The Tiruvuru road connects it with NH 221 in the north-west and the Hanuman Junction road connects it to NH 5 in the south-east. The Andhra Pradesh State Road Transport Corporation operates bus services from Nuzvid bus station. Nuzvid railway station is under the jurisdiction of Vijayawada railway division of South Central Railway zone. It is situated on the Howrah-Chennai main line.

== Bus Transport ==
- Nuzvid have Bus Depot and bus stand operated by APSRTC.
- Mainly buses are operated to different routes like Vijayawada, Hyderabad, Bangalore, Visakhapatnam, Kadapa, Bhadrachalam, Tirupathi and Yerra Gondapalam, Satthupally, Machilipatnam.
- Every 20 mins we have NON-Stop Buses to Vijayawada.

== Railway Station ==
- Nuzvid station is far away from Nuzvid town (20 km away) at Hanuman Junction, it is located between in Chennai and Howarh railway route.
- From Nuzvid station nearly 15+ trains will halt at Nuzvid Station and 50+ trains will cross the station on daily basis.

== Education ==
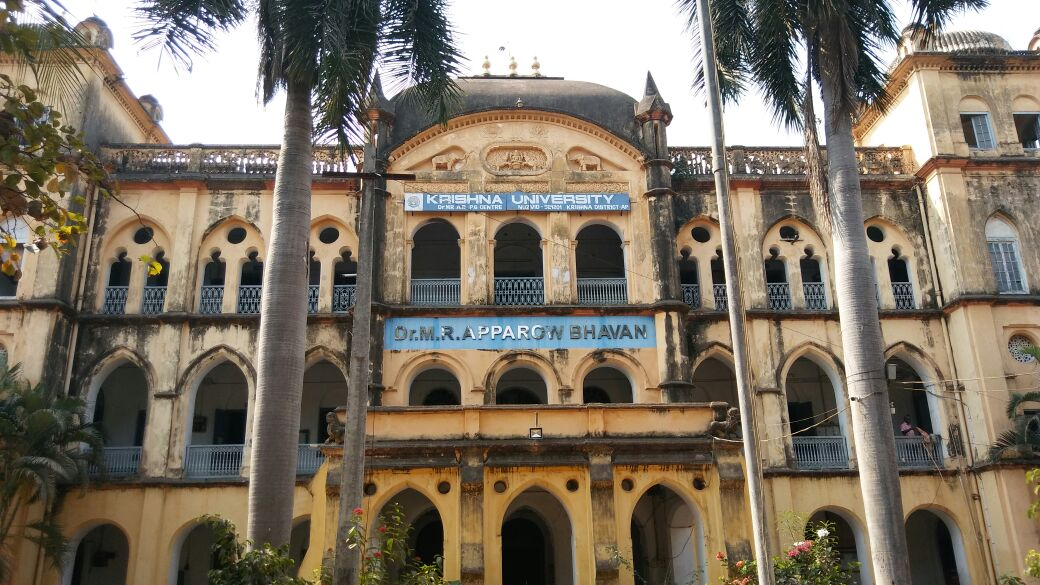

The primary and secondary school education is imparted by government, aided and private schools, under the School Education Department of the state. The medium of instruction followed by different schools are English and Telugu.

Nuzvid is an educational centre for the surrounding areas with colleges including Rajiv Gandhi University of Knowledge Technologies, Nuzvid, Krishna University, Sarathi Inst. of Technology, Nuzvid Polytechnic.

== See also ==
- Villages in Nuzvid mandal
