= Sri Venkateswara Medical College =

College in Tirupati, Andhra Pradesh, India

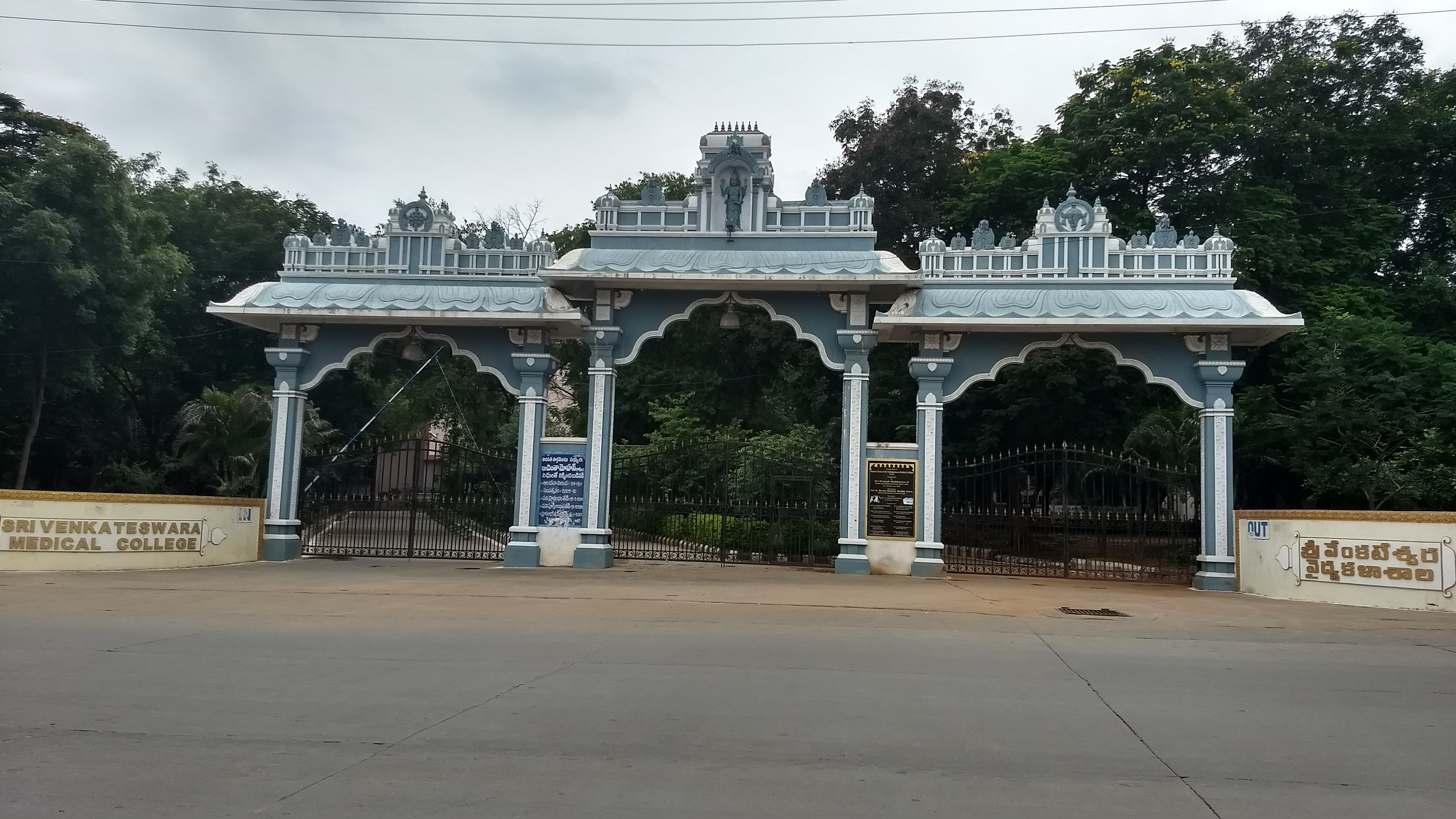
- Type: Medical College
- Established: 1960; 66 years ago
- Affiliations: Dr. NTR University of Health Sciences
- Principal: Dr. Gottumukkala Ravi Prabhu
- Undergraduates: 240 per year
- Postgraduates: 146 per year
- Location: Tirupati, Andhra Pradesh, India
- Campus: Urban
- Nickname: S. V. Medical College
- Website: https://svmctpt.edu.in/

Sri Venkateswara Medical College is a medical college in Tirupati, Andhra Pradesh, India, established in 1960. It has 240 undergraduate and 146 postgraduate seats. The college is recognised by National Medical Commission.

== Teaching hospitals ==
- SRi Venkateswara Ramnarain Ruia Government General Hospital (SVRRGGH)

Govt Maternity Hospital & Institute of Pregnant Women

== See also ==
- Sri Padmavathi Medical College
