= Engineering Agricultural and Pharmacy Common Entrance Test =

Entrance examination in India

- Acronym: EAPCET
- Type: Computer-based standardised test
- Administrator: JNTU, Kakinada (AP EAPCET); JNTU, Hyderabad (TG EAPCET)
- Purpose: Admission to undergraduate engineering, agriculture and pharmacy (including veterinary) courses in various colleges across the states of Andhra Pradesh and Telangana
- Year started: 1986 (40 years ago)
- Duration: 180 minutes
- Score range: 0 to 160
- Regions: India
- Languages: English, Telugu

Engineering Agricultural and Pharmacy Common Entrance Test (EAPCET) is an entrance examination held separately in the Indian states of Andhra Pradesh (AP EAPCET) and Telangana (TG EAPCET) for admission into various undergraduate colleges across both the states in the streams of Engineering, Agriculture and Pharmacy (including Veterinary).

AP EAPCET is being held since 1986. After the bifurcation of Andhra Pradesh, TG EAPCET is being held separately in Telangana, since 2015.

== History ==
The exam was started in 1986 by the Government of Andhra Pradesh as "Engineering Medical Common Entrance Test (EMCET)". It is a yearly examination taken by a large number of engineering and medical aspirants for the entrance into undergraduate colleges across Andhra Pradesh. It was later renamed as "Engineering Agricultural and Medical Common Entrance Test (EAMCET)", where the exam for Agriculture courses were also included. This is the entrance exam for engineering ('E' category), agriculture ('A' category) and pharmacy ('P' category) for admission to BE/BArch/BTech/BPharm, etc.

After the bifurcation of Andhra Pradesh in 2014, the exam was renamed as AP EAMCET and TS EAMCET, for Andhra Pradesh and Telangana states respectively. The exam was conducted on 22 May 2014. There has been controversy regarding the EAMCET counselling after the state was split into Telangana and Andhra Pradesh. The APSCHE (Andhra Pradesh State Council for Higher Education) has issued the notification for counselling starting 1 August of the academic year and all seats should be positively filled by 15 August 2014. The Telangana government has filed a suit in Supreme court to delay the counselling. The Supreme Court on 1 August 2014 reserved verdict on Telangana State's application seeking extension of the time schedule for counselling for admissions to engineering and medicine for 2014-15 till 31 October. The Supreme court has made it clear that it could extend the counselling for one month and not beyond 31 August 2014. The bench also said there could be no question of preference being given to 'locals' in admission to colleges within Telangana.

AP EAMCET 2016 exam was held on 29 April 2016. This was conducted by JNTU on behalf of APSCHE. TS EAMCET 2016 exam was held on 15 May 2016. TS Eamcet 3 exam was held on 11 September 2016. Both AP EAMCET and TS EAMCET extended the application form deadline due to COVID-19 in 2020. TS EAMCET 2020 Exam Dates has been revised. The examination will be conducted from 9 to 14 September 2020 (for Engineering) and 9 & 11 September 2020 (for Agriculture). APEAMCET-2020 test will be conducted on 17th to 25th, September 2020.

Since the inception of EAMCET, it used to be the entrance exam for medical colleges in Andhra Pradesh (later Telangana also), but after the introduction of NEET (UG) and NEET (PG) in 2013, it the latter two have become the mandatory entrance exams for medical colleges across the nation. So, the government decided to remove the letter M in EAMCET which stands for medicine, and instead add P which stands for pharmacy. The name AP EAMCET was renamed to AP EAPCET in 2021. Similarly, TS EAMCET was also renamed to TG EAPCET in 2024. Prior to the exam, the Government of Telangana has made it official to use nomenclature of TG instead of TS. Thus, the exam in Telangana was abbreviated as TG EAPCET. In 2024, the AP EAPCET examination was conducted from 16 May 2024 to 22 May 2024.

== Eligibility ==
Candidates should have passed or appeared for the final year of intermediate examination (10+2) with Mathematics, Physics and Chemistry as optional or related vocational courses in the fields of Engineering and Technology held by the Board of Intermediate Education or Diploma Examination in Engineering/Architecture conducted by the State Board of Technical Education & Training or equivalent. Candidates must have Indian nationality.

== Organizing body ==
Andhra Pradesh State Council of Higher Education and Telangana State Council of Higher Education conduct the exams AP EAPCET and TG EAPCET respectively.

=== Organizing institutes ===
The below list shows the institute that conducts the exam.

Andhra Pradesh
Year	Exam	Administrator
1986–2014	EAMCET	Jawaharlal Nehru Technological University, Hyderabad
2015–2020	AP EAMCET	Jawaharlal Nehru Technological University, Kakinada
2021–present	AP EAPCET	Jawaharlal Nehru Technological University, Kakinada

Telangana
Year	Exam	Administrator
2015–2023	TS EAMCET	Jawaharlal Nehru Technological University, Hyderabad
2024–present	TG EAPCET	Jawaharlal Nehru Technological University, Hyderabad
