= Vignan's Institute of Information Technology =

Engineering college in Andrha Pradesh, India

Vignan's Institute Of Information Technology
- Motto: "Excellence through Dedication"
- Type: Engineering College
- Established: 2002
- Chairman: Dr.L Rathaiah
- Rector: Dr.V.Madhusudhan Rao
- Principal: Dr.Sudhakar Jyothula
- Location: Duvvada, Visakhapatnam, Andhra Pradesh, India
- Website: vignaniit.edu.in

Vignan's Institute Of Information Technology is one of the engineering institutions run by the Vignan group of Guntur. It was established in 2002 to offer undergraduate (B. Tech) (college code:L3) courses in engineering and technology. It is situated in Duvvada, a suburban region of Visakhapatnam, India.

== Rankings ==
University rankings

Engineering – India
- NIRF (2024): 201-300

The National Institutional Ranking Framework (NIRF) ranked the university between 201-300 in the engineering rankings in 2024.

== Library facility ==
This college has a library named vignan dhara it has all volumes related to all departments

== Location ==
Vignan Vizag, Duvvada, Visakhapatnam, Andhra Pradesh.
