= Jawaharlal Nehru Technological University, Kakinada =

University in Andhra Pradesh, India

Jawaharlal Nehru Technological University Kakinada
- Other name: JNTUK
- Type: Public
- Established: 2008; 18 years ago
- Academic affiliations: UGC, NAAC A+, AIU
- Chancellor: Governor of Andhra Pradesh
- Vice-Chancellor: C. S. R. K. Prasad
- Students: 5,109
- Undergraduates: 3,539
- Postgraduates: 1570
- Location: Kakinada, Andhra Pradesh, India; 16.9786°N 82.2406°E
- Campus: Urban, 110 acres (45 ha)
- Website: www.jntuk.edu.in

Jawaharlal Nehru Technological University Kakinada (JNTU Kakinada) is a collegiate public state university located in Kakinada, Andhra Pradesh, India. JNTUK was established in the year 2008 vide ACT NO. 30 OF 2008 by the State of Andhra Pradesh. The University grew out of the College of Engineering Vizagapatam founded by the Government of the composite Madras State in the year 1946.

JNTUK has been accredited by the National Assessment and Accreditation Council (NAAC) of the University Grants Commission (UGC) with an "A+" grade. It is a non-profit university which is funded and managed by the Government of Andhra Pradesh. Admissions into the Bachelors, Masters and Doctoral programs in main campus is on a merit basis, evaluated by national entrance examinations such as AP-EAPCET, AP-CPGET, AP-LAWCET, and GATE for each of the programs offered.

== History ==
It was founded as Government Engineering College, Kakinada in 1946 and was affilaited to Andhra University. Later, it became a constituent college of Jawaharlal Nehru Technological University, Hyderabad, on October 2, 1972. In 2008, the institution was separated from JNTU Hyderabad and made university, now known as JNTU Kakinada by the Andhra Pradesh state legislature.

== Academics ==
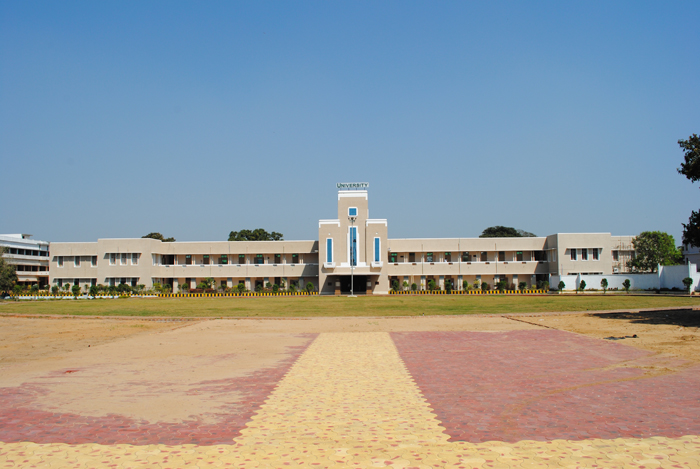
Administration Building

The college offers BTech undergraduate and postgraduate degrees in various fields. JNTU Kakinada has established the following schools:

- School of Management Studies
- School of Spatial Information Technology
- School of Health Sciences and Research
- School of Pharmaceutical Sciences & Technologies
- School of Renewable Energy & Environment
- School of Food Technology
- School of Biotechnology
- School of Avionics
- School of Soft Skills & Public Relations

== Admissions ==
Admission into BTech is based on EAMCET or ECET ranks; admission into MTech is based on Graduate Aptitude Test in Engineering or PGECET scores; and admission into MCA and MBA is based on ICET rank. Students in the state with the highest grades in the above entrance examinations get admission to the college.

Admission into its undergraduate engineering courses is extremely competitive with less than 1% of the students from the Open Category getting selected to study at the University College of Engineering Kakinada, JNTUK through EAMCET entrance examination every year.

== Constituent colleges ==
JNTU Kakinada has two constituent colleges: University College of Engineering, Kakinada and University College of Engineering, Narasaraopet. On 12 January 2022, the Government of Andhra Pradesh granted university status to JNTUK Vizianagaram and renamed it as Jawaharlal Nehru Technological University - Gurajada, Vizianagaram.

=== Rankings ===
University rankings

Engineering – India
- NIRF (2023): 101-150

University College of Engineering, Kakinada was ranked in the 101-150 band among engineering colleges by the NIRF in 2023.

== Notable alumni ==
Notable alumni include:

- Satya N. Atluri, Mechanical Engineering (1959-1963); Padma Bhushan in science and engineering, 2013
- E. Sreedharan, Padma Vibhushan
- B. V. R. Mohan Reddy, CEO Cyient
