= Sri Venkateswara Institute of Medical Sciences =

Medical University in Tirupati, Andhra Pradesh

- Motto: Śrīnivāsō vijayatē (Victory To Lord Venkateshwara)
- Type: State university
- Established: 2 February 1993; 33 years ago
- Affiliations: UGC, NMC
- Director: Dr. G. Jagadesh
- Location: Tirupati, Andhra Pradesh, India
- Nickname: SVIMS
- Website: http://svimstpt.ap.nic.in/

Sri Venkateswara Institute of Medical Sciences (SVIMS) is a medical state university and a specialty hospital in Tirupati, Andhra Pradesh, India. SVIMS was conceived along the lines of the AIIMS Delhi, and was established by an act of the Andhra Pradesh State Legislature. The foundation stone was laid on 18 April 1986 by N. T. Rama Rao, the then Chief Minister of Andhra Pradesh. The hospital began functioning on 2 February 1993 and later became a Medical State university in 1995. The current Director-cum-Vice Chancellor is Dr. G. Jagadesh.

== Rankings ==
The National Institutional Ranking Framework (NIRF) ranked Sri Venkateswara Institute of Medical Sciences 72 overall in India in 2019, 77 among universities and 29th in the medical ranking.

== Academics ==
The college offers the 4 1/2-year M.B.B.S. course with a one-year compulsory rotating internship. There are 175 seats which are filled through NEET UG exam.

=== Postgraduate and doctoral courses ===
Sri Venkateswara Institute of Medical Sciences offers postgraduate courses in almost all disciplines. Similarly, it offers a variety of doctoral courses including MCh Neurosurgery, Cardiac Surgery among others and DM in Cardiology, Neurology There are more than 28 post graduate and post doctoral courses.
