= Krishna University =

State university in Andhra Pradesh, India

- Motto in English: Education through competition
- Type: Public
- Established: 2008
- Affiliations: UGC, AICTE, AIU
- Chancellor: Governor of Andhra Pradesh
- Vice-Chancellor: Koona Ramji
- Location: Machilipatnam, Andhra Pradesh, India
- Campus: 100 acres (40 ha); Rural
- Website: www.kru.ac.in

Krishna University (KrU) is a state university located in Rudravaram, Machilipatnam, Andhra Pradesh, India. The university was established in 2008 by the Government of Andhra Pradesh.

It provides degree courses like Bachelor of Science, Bachelor of Commerce, Bachelor of Arts and professional courses like Bachelor of Engineering in Computer Science & Electronics and Communication engineering.

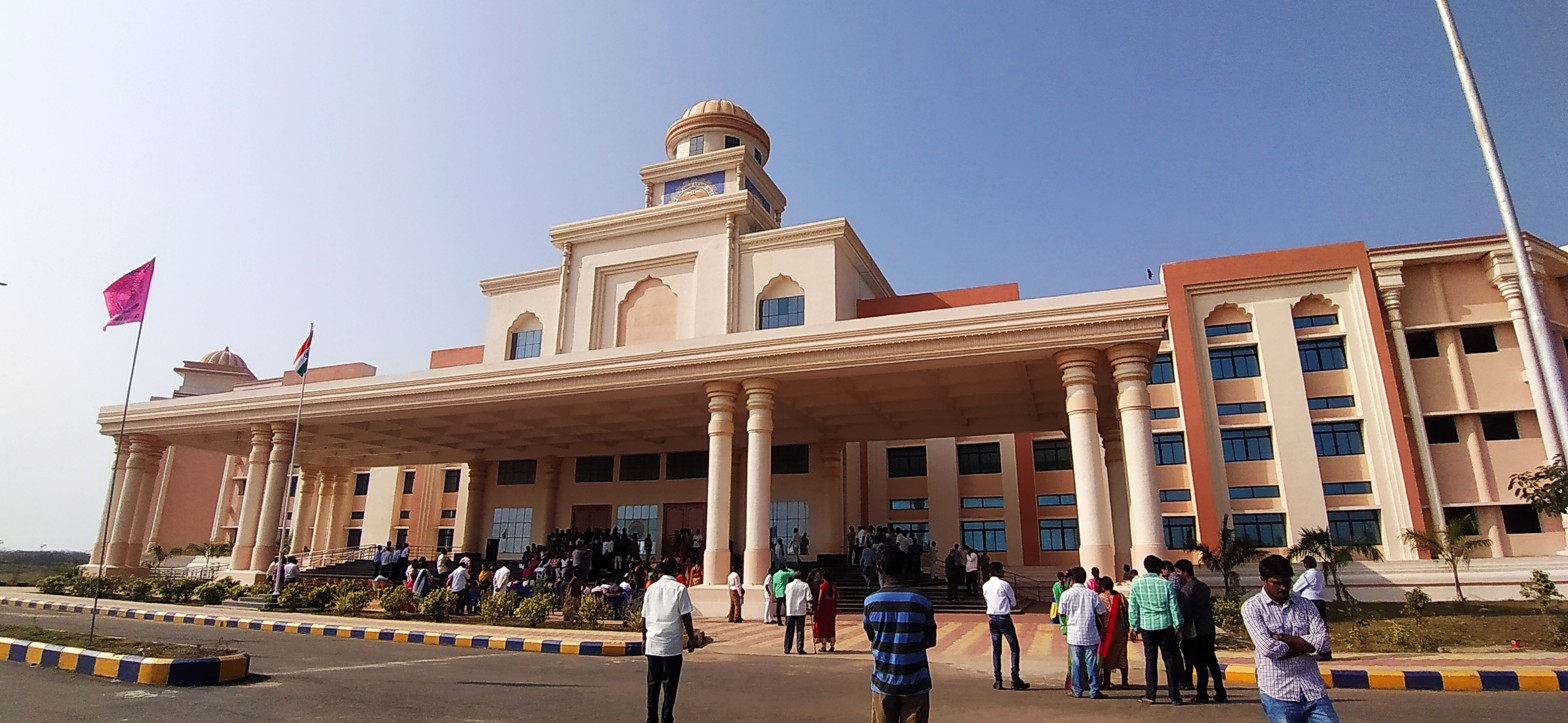
Krishna University Administrative block and University College of Engineering

The university offers Pharmacy courses like B.pharmacy and M.pharmacy, It also consists of Master courses like Master of Technology, Master of Arts, Master of Science courses.

== Colleges ==
It has the following constituent colleges:

- KrU College of Arts and Science
- KrU Dr. MRAR College of Post Graduation Studies
- KrU College of Engineering and Technology
- KrU College of Pharmaceutical Sciences and Research

== Notable affiliated colleges ==
- Kakaraparti Bhavanarayana College
- Aditya Degree College
- Annapurna Memorial Modern Degree College
- Bishop Azaraiah Degree College
- Gowtham Degree College

== See also ==
- List of universities in India
- Education in India
