= King George Hospital, Visakhapatnam =

Coordinates: 17.708696°N 83.306116°E

King George Hospital

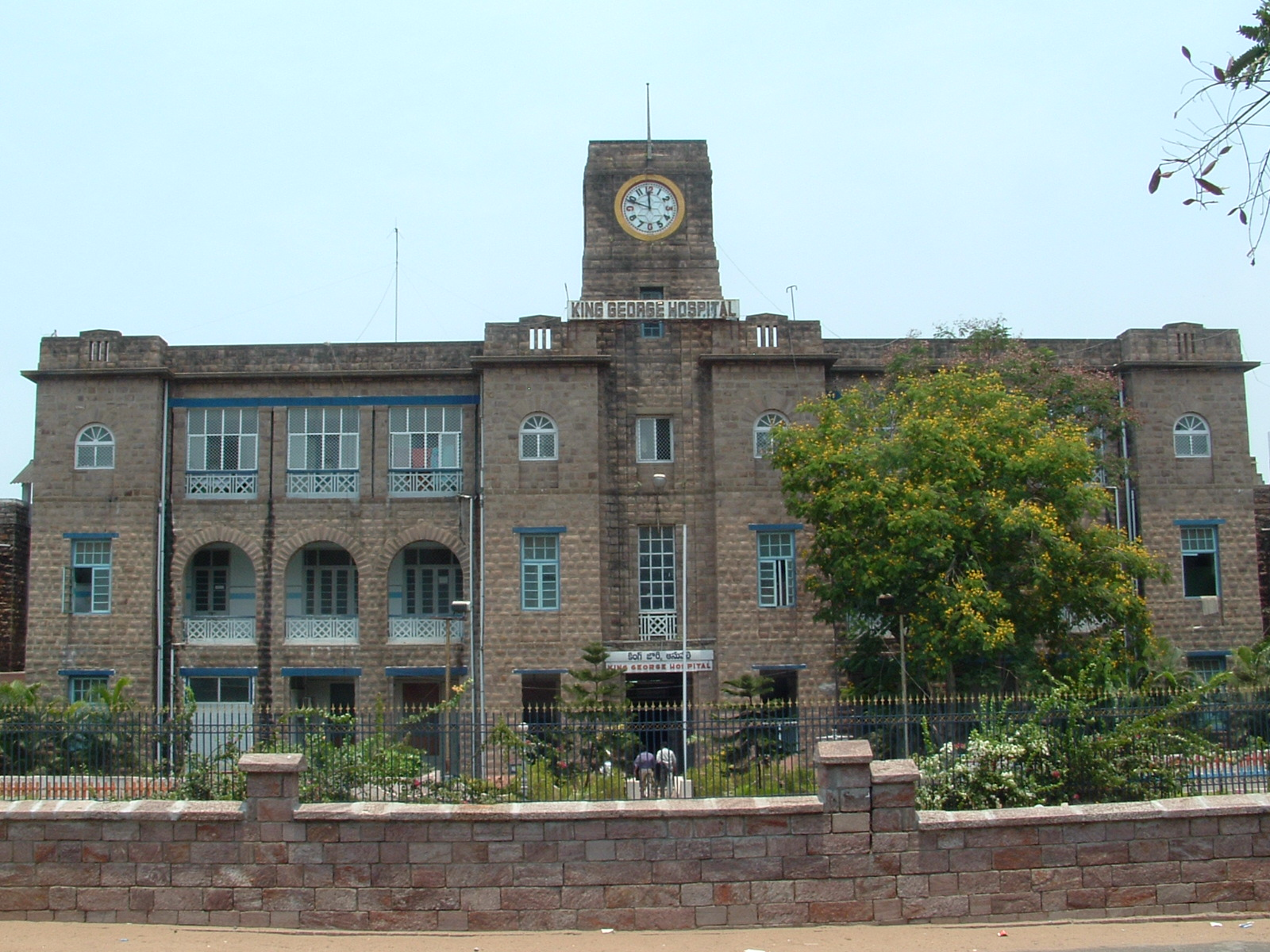

Geography
- Location: Maharanipeta, Visakhapatnam, Andhra Pradesh, India

Organisation
- Care system: University Health Sciences
- Type: General
- Affiliated university: Andhra Medical College

Services
- Emergency department: Yes
- Beds: 1237

History
- Founded: 1845

Links
- Website: Official website

King George Hospital (commonly known as KGH) is a public hospital located in Visakhapatnam, Andhra Pradesh, India. It is the largest and busiest government hospital in Andhra Pradesh. King George Hospital is affiliated with the Andhra Medical College.

The hospital served the needs of north coastal Andhra Pradesh and adjacent Odisha for more than 150 years. The hospital handles over 1,000 out-patient department (O.P.D.) cases daily, including patients from Odisha and Chhattisgarh.

== History ==
It was started as a civil dispensary in 1845 and upgraded to a 30-bed hospital in 1857. The hospital's new building was inaugurated by Hon'ble Raja of Panagal, Chief Minister of Madras, on 19 July 1923.

The hospital sees over 1250 outpatients every day in various departments. Laboratory tests can be done inside the hospital. Turnaround time for laboratory test results is about three to four days. Average wait time to see a doctor is between one and two hours on a weekday.

In the year 2020, Dr P V Sudhakar, Principal, AMC College(AMC), unveiled a ₹380 crores modernisation plan for the college.

Entrance to King George Hospital & Andhra Medical College.

== Affiliated hospitals ==
1. Rani Chandramani Devi Government Hospital
2. Government Victoria Hospital for Women and Children
3. Government Hospital For Mental Care
4. Government Hospital for Chest & Communicable diseases
5. Government ENT Hospital, Visakhapatnam
6. Government Regional Eye Hospital
7. Dr. Rednam Surya Prasada Rao Regional Eye Hospital
8. Regional Health Center at Simhachalam
9. Community Health Center Aganampudi
10. Community Health Center, Chintapalli
11. Community Health Center, Chodavaram
12. Community Health Center Kotavaratla
13. Community Health Center Nakkapalli
14. Community Health Center, Bheemunipatnam
15. Community Health Center, Paderu
16. Community Hospital, APVVP-Araku Valley
17. Community Health Center, V. Madugula
18. Community Health Center, Yelamanchili

== See also ==
- Visakha Institute of Medical Sciences
