= Procedural sedation and analgesia =

- MeSH: D016292
- MedlinePlus: 007409

Procedural sedation and analgesia (PSA) is a technique in which a sedating/dissociative medication is given, usually along with an analgesic medication, in order to perform non-surgical procedures on a patient. The overall goal is to induce a decreased level of consciousness while maintaining the patient's ability to breathe on their own. PSA is commonly used in the emergency department, in addition to the operating room. While PSA is considered safe and has low rates of complication, it is important to conduct a pre-procedural assessment, determine any contraindications to PSA, choose the most appropriate sedative agent, and monitor the patient for potential complications both during and after the procedure.

== Medical uses ==
This technique is often used in the emergency department for the performance of painful or uncomfortable procedures. Common purposes include:

- laceration repair
- setting fractures
- draining abscesses
- reducing dislocations
- performing endoscopy
- for cardioversion
- during various dental procedures
- during transesophageal echocardiogram
- and certain imaging or minor procedures where the patient is unable (or unwilling) to keep still—especially children

== Contraindications ==
There are no absolute reasons that immediately disqualify a patient from receiving PSA. However, a patient's age, medical comorbidities, or evidence of a difficult airway are important considerations.

=== Age ===
Although there is no age limit for PSA, the elderly have a greater chance of complications such as longer than intended sedation time, increased sensitivity to medications, adverse effects of medications, and higher than expected drug levels due to difficulty clearing the drugs. To help reduce risk of complications, consider a less aggressive approach to PSA, including starting with a smaller dose than given for non-elderly patients, giving the medication slowly, giving repeat doses of the medications less often.

=== Comorbidities ===
Patients with serious medical conditions are at greater chance for negative side effects after receiving PSA. Examples of comorbidities include heart failure, COPD, neuromuscular disease. Use the ASA Classification to predict a patient's risk for serious complications from PSA, such as hypotension or respiratory depression. Generally, patients with ASA Class III or greater are more likely to develop such complications. Similar to previously described, consider starting with a smaller dose, giving the medication slowly, and giving repeat doses of the medications less often to decrease risk of complications associated with comorbidities.

=== Difficult airway ===
An airway is assessed by the patient's ability or the physician's ability to oxygenate (provide oxygen) or ventilate (exhale carbon dioxide). Examples of a difficult airway include a thick neck/obese patient, head and neck structural abnormalities, and lung disease. The problem is not that the patient will not respond appropriately to medications, as is the case with older patients or those with medical comorbidities, but that if there is a complication, it will be more difficult for the physician to protect the patient's airway and save them from complications. It is generally advised to consider alternatives to PSA if the patient is assessed to have a difficult airway. Measures such as reducing starting dose, giving drugs slowly, and redosing less frequently will not change risk of PSA complications in a patient with a difficult airway.

== Spectrum of Sedation ==
While procedural sedation is often used to avoid airway intervention, sedation is a continuum and a patient can easily slip into a deeper state. For this reason, a physician who is performing PSA should be prepared to care for a patient at least one level of sedation greater than that intended. In order to do this, a practitioner must be able to recognize the level of sedation and understand the increasing cardiopulmonary risk that is associated with deeper sedation.

The American Society of Anesthesiologists defines the continuum of sedation as follows:

	Minimal Sedation	Moderate Sedation	Deep Sedation	General Anesthesia
Responsiveness	Normal to verbal stimulus	Purposeful response to verbal or tactile stimulus	Purposeful to repeated or painful stimulus	Unarousable, even to painful stimulus
Airway	Unaffected	No intervention required	Intervention may be required	Intervention often required
Ventilation	Unaffected	Adequate	May be inadequate	Frequently inadequate
Cardiovascular Function	Unaffected	Usually maintained	Usually maintained	May be impaired

There is another type of sedation known as dissociative sedation. It causes profound amnesia but allows spontaneous respiration, cardiopulmonary stability, and airway reflexes are still intact. Ketamine is a commonly used drug that can cause this type of sedation.

== Sedative agents ==
=== Propofol ===
Propofol is a non-barbiturate derivative that is thought to act by stimulating inhibitory GABA receptors and blocking excitatory NMDA receptors. It takes 40 seconds for the effects of propofol to kick in, and effects last six minutes. Propofol has both sedative and amnestic effects, but provides no analgesia. Adverse effects to look out for include hypotension (low blood pressure) and respiratory depression, manifested as mild drops in oxygen saturation levels. Propofol is also painful when administered intravenously, therefore, lidocaine is commonly used as a pretreatment to help decrease the pain associated with administering propofol. Additionally, it has antiemetic properties that are also useful in these types of procedures.

=== Etomidate ===
Etomidate is an imidazole derivative, commonly used for the induction of general anesthesia. Effects kick in almost immediately, within 5–15 seconds, and last 5–15 minutes. Etomidate carries sedative effects only; it does not provide pain relief. Side effects of etomidate include myoclonus (involuntary muscle jerking) and respiratory depression. One of the major benefits of etomidate is that it does not cause cardiovascular or respiratory instability. This makes it a potentially more preferable choice for those with already lower blood pressure.

=== Midazolam ===
Midazolam is a benzodiazepine that acts by stimulating inhibitory GABA receptors. Effects are seen within 2–5 minutes, and last 30–60 minutes. Its main effect is anxiolysis, helping to reduce feelings of anxiety, and amnestic effects, helping the patient to forget memories associated with the procedure. It provides no analgesia, so it was commonly used with fentanyl for effective PSA prior to propofol and etomidate. Midazolam collects in the body's fatty tissues, so a possible complication includes prolonged sedation. As a result, the elderly, the obese, and those with kidney or liver disease are more vulnerable to prolonged sedation with midazolam. Respiratory depression is also associated with midazolam when given in high doses.

=== Ketamine ===
Ketamine is a dissociative sedative, meaning it takes the patient into a dream-like level of consciousness. Effects occur within 30 seconds, and last 5–20 minutes. Ketamine has sedative, analgesic, and amnestic properties, but most of its uses today are focused on analgesia. Some of the benefits of ketamine is that it does not compromise the patient's airway protective reflexes, keeps the upper airway muscle tone, and allows for spontaneous breathing. A common side effect of ketamine is emergence reactions. The patient may become disoriented, entranced, or experience hallucinations. Although usually benign, these reactions may also be frightening for the patient. Other reported complications include fast heart rate, elevated blood pressure, nausea, vomiting, and laryngospasm, but usually in the context of oropharyngeal manipulation.

=== Dexmedetomidine ===
Dexmedetomidine is a more recent agent used in this process. It is an alpha-2 adrenergic agonist that causes sedation and does have some analgesic properties. It has minimal effect on respiratory function. It will affect cardiac function as the dose increases.

== Analgesic agents ==
=== Opioids ===
Opioids are used to suppress pain by acting primarily on μ-opioid receptors (MOR) in addition to various other opioid receptors located within the central nervous system. They will cause some dose dependent cardiopulmonary suppression. They have addictive properties and have led to the opioid epidemic. When used for procedural sedation these are started at low dose then titrated to reach the desired effect.

Fentanyl is a synthetic opioid, 75-125 times stronger than morphine, that acts by activating opioid receptors in the nervous system. Its effects begin in 2–3 minutes, and last 30–60 minutes. Fentanyl provides analgesia and sedative properties; it does not have any amnestic effects. It was commonly used with midazolam for effective PSA prior to propofol and etomidate. The major complication of fentanyl is respiratory depression, which can be made worse when given with other sedative agents.

Ketamine, as stated above, has both analgesic and sedative properties and can be useful as an alternative analgesic agent; small doses of ketamine have been found to be safer than fentanyl when used in combination with propofol.

== Assessment ==
Mallampati scores I - IV

Any patient undergoing anaesthesia must be pre-assessed for risk using a classification system, such as the one devised by the American Society of Anesthesiologists (ASA). In addition to pre-assessment, the patients medical history should be taken with special attention to history of anaesthesia. These things contribute to the ASA physical status classification system. This system starts at ASA 1 which is a healthy individual and escalates to ASA 6 which is a brain dead individual. It is safe to perform sedation in the emergency room on patients who are ASA 1 or 2. If the patient is ASA 3 or 4 additional resources might be needed, such as a person with more training in procedural sedation, an anesthesiologist. Furthermore, before a qualified anesthesia professional performs PSA, an Informed consent should be completed.

Airway assessment is one of the most important parts of the physical exam when done as part of the pre-procedure work-up. There is always a risk that a patient is sedated more heavily than intended and consequently require some sort of airway intervention. Therefore, the anesthetist should perform an airway exam that includes a Mallampati score, mouth opening assessment, and Thyromental distance. If the patient is deemed to have a difficult airway, there should be adequate resources in case airway intervention is required. These include things like a Glidescope, fiberscope optic, and an intubating Laryngeal mask airway.

== Safety and Monitoring ==
It is important to keep track of the patient's vital signs, especially oxygen saturation and blood pressure when giving PSA to ensure adequate cardiopulmonary function. Monitors are also useful for PSA safety. These include cardiac monitoring such as electrocardiogram, pulse oximetry, blood pressure cuff, and an end tidal carbon dioxide monitor. Deep sedation resulting in respiratory depression can cause some quantitative changes to these monitors, hence why it is important to monitor them. One of the first things that can be seen is a rise in end tidal carbon dioxide. This happens well before a drop in oxygen saturation. Depending on the how substantial the respiratory depression, the physician can use supplemental oxygen or other airway interventions to stabilize the patient. Visual assessment is also an important part of PSA. To quantify the level of consciousness, the physician uses different levels of stimulation and observes the patient's response.

=== Aspiration risk ===
There is a theoretical concern that performing PSA on a patient with food in their stomach can increase the risk of aspiration. Currently, there is no evidence to suggest clinically significant risk of aspiration of stomach contents if performing PSA on a patient with recent food intake. In fact, there is evidence to suggest that fasting is not required to prevent aspiration in most cases. However, when possible, fasting is still preferred. For most agents, the patient should have had nothing to eat for at least six hours. Clear fluids can be allowed up to two hours before the procedure. One can consider using ketamine if there is a high risk of aspiration, given ketamine does not compromise protective airway reflexes. However, in the emergency department setting, PSA is usually administered without waiting the full six hours, unless there is clear evidence that the patient may not be able to maintain his/her airway on their own.

== Discharge criteria ==
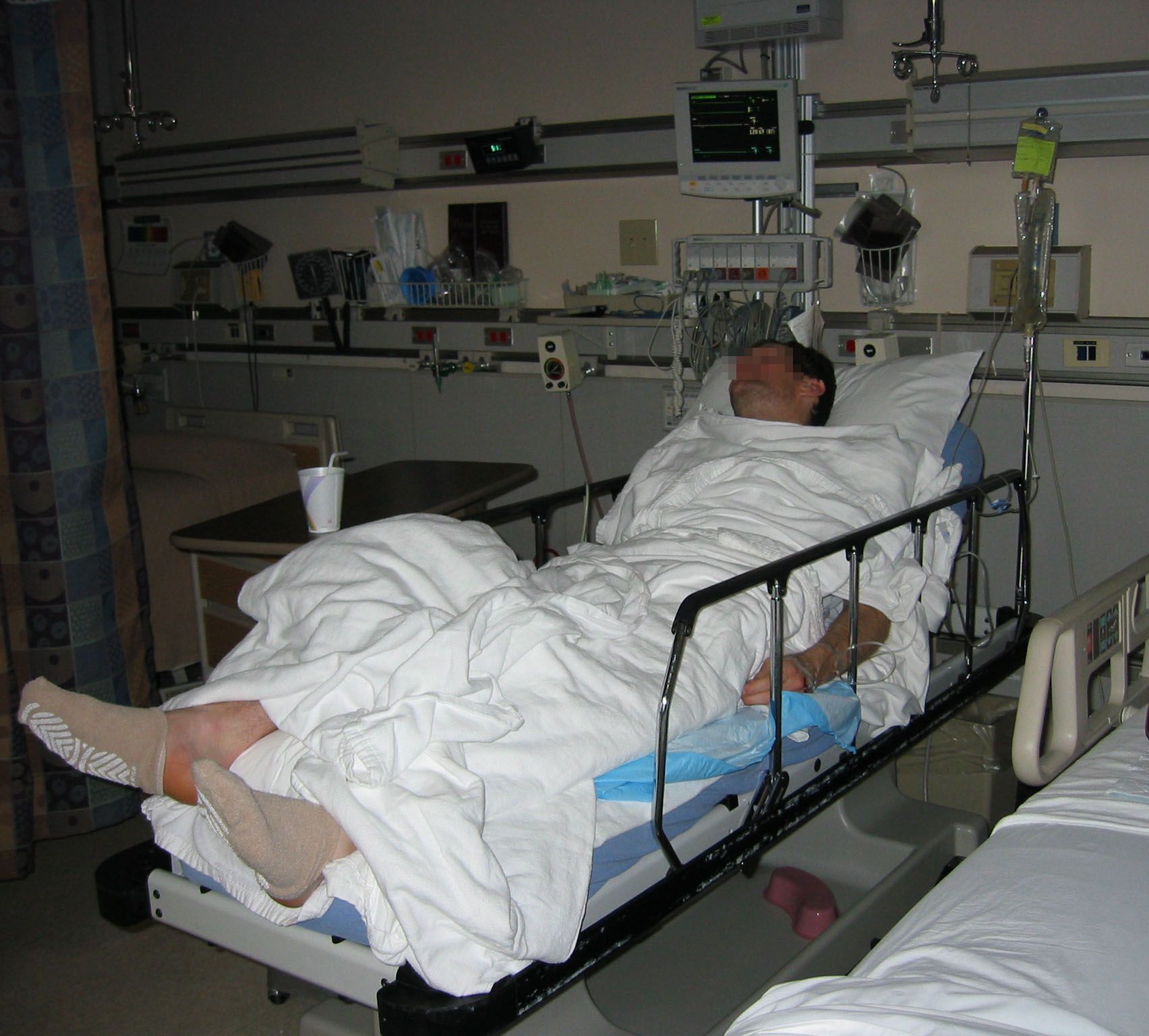
Patient being monitored following anesthesia

There are a few criteria for discharging a patient who has undergone procedural sedation. The recovery time for a patient to be ready for discharge varies but is typically 60–120 minutes. The criteria are as follows:

1. Patient must be stable from a cardiovascular standpoint and have an open airway.
2. The patient should be easy to arouse and have intact reflexes such as a gag and cough reflex.
3. They should be approaching their baseline in terms of talking and sitting up.
4. The patient should be properly hydrated.
5. In a special population patient, such as a very young or mentally disabled patient, they should be about as responsive as they were pre-sedation.

== Complications ==
PSA can cause several complications. These include allergic reactions, over-sedation, respiratory depression, hemodynamic effects and post-operative cognitive dysfunction. These typically depend on the sedative agent used. Some agents are more likely to cause complications than others, but all sedative agents can cause complications if not used properly. Titration, or dosage manipulation, is a common technique used to reduce these complications. Additionally, some agents have antagonists, reversal agents, that can be used to reverse the effects or reduce the amount of sedation. Additionally, a person is assigned to monitor the status of the patient and should be able to recognize the complications of PSA. Their ability to alert others and respond accordingly reduces complications. Unique complications of the most commonly used sedatives are listed below.

- Propofol - Pain with injection, Dose-dependent hypotension (most common), bradycardia & myocardial depression, Hypertriglyceridemia (less common), Pancreatitis (less common), Myoclonus & seizure-like activity, and propofol-related infusion syndrome (rare)
- Etomidate - Pain with injection, Adrenal suppression, Post-operative Nausea and Vomiting (high incidence when compared to other agents), Myoclonus and seizure-like activity
- Midazolam - Amnesia, Delirium, Prolonged sedation, Paradoxical reaction (agitation, aggression, restlessness instead of sedation), Drug interactions (Effects prolonged by medications that inhibit the CYP3A4 enzyme such as erythromycin, antifungals and grapefruit juice)
- Ketamine - Hypertension & Tachycardia, Elevation in intracranial and intraocular pressures, Post-Operative Nausea and Vomiting, Emergence Reactions (hallucinations, agitation, vivid dreams, delirium)
- Dexmedetomidine - Bradycardia & transient hypertension followed by hypotension, Prolonged sedation
- Opioids - Respiratory depression, Hypotension & Bradycardia, CNS effects (cognitive impairment, euphoria, addiction, hyperalgesia (increased pain), delirium), Nausea & vomiting, Constipation, Urinary retention, Endocrine & Immune effects (hypogonadism (decrease sex hormones), adrenal suppression, immunosuppression)

== Controversies ==
Some resistance to sedation techniques used outside the operating room by non-anesthetists has been voiced.
