= Cormack–Lehane classification system =

Classification system

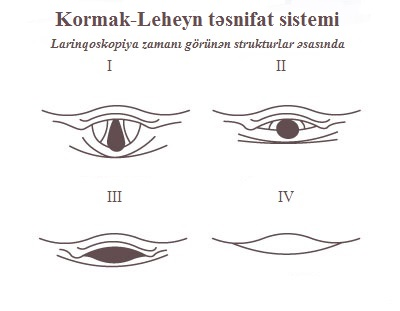
Original Cormack-Lehane Classification System (1984)

The Cormack–Lehane classification system is a method used in anesthesiology to categorize the view obtained during direct laryngoscopy, primarily assessing the visibility of the glottis and surrounding laryngeal structures. Introduced in 1984 by British anesthetists R.S. Cormack and J. Lehane, this system aids in predicting the difficulty of tracheal intubation. In 1998, a modified version subdivided Grade 2 to enhance its predictive accuracy.

== Original classification ==
The original system, described in 1984, comprised four grades:

Grade	Description
1	Full view of the glottis.
2	Partial view of the glottis.
3	Only the epiglottis is visible; the glottis is not seen.
4	Neither the glottis nor the epiglottis is visible.

== Modification ==
To enhance the system's predictive value, Yentis and Lee proposed a modification in 1998, subdividing Grade II into:

Grade IIa: Partial view of the glottis.

Grade IIb: Only the posterior extremity of the glottis or only the arytenoid cartilages are visible.

This modification provides a more nuanced assessment of intubation difficulty and the classification correlates with the likelihood of difficult intubation.

Grade	Description	Approximate frequency	Likelihood of difficult intubation
1	Full view of glottis	68–74%	<1%
2a	Partial view of glottis	21–24%	4.3–13.4%
2b	Only posterior extremity of glottis seen or only arytenoid cartilages	3.3–6.5%	65–67.4%
3	Only epiglottis seen, none of glottis seen	1.2–1.6%	80–87.5%
4	Neither glottis nor epiglottis seen	very rare	very likely

=== Reliability and knowledge among practitioners ===
Despite its widespread use, studies have shown variability in anesthesiologists' familiarity with the Cormack–Lehane classification and its inter- and intra-observer reliability. A study revealed that while 89% of participants claimed to know a classification system for laryngeal view, only 25% could accurately define all four grades of the Cormack–Lehane system. Additionally, inter-observer reliability was fair (κ coefficient of 0.35), and intra-observer reliability was poor (κ of 0.15).

=== Alternative and complementary Systems ===
Other systems, such as the Mallampati score, are used alongside the Cormack–Lehane classification to predict difficult intubation. However, no single bedside test has proven entirely accurate in predicting Cormack–Lehane grades.

== See also ==
- Mallampati score
- Simplified Airway Risk Index
- Thyromental distance
