= King George Hospital =

King George Hospital may refer to:

- King George Hospital, London, London Borough of Redbridge, England
- King George's Hospital, Lucknow, Lucknow, Uttar Pradesh, India
- King George V Memorial Hospital, Sydney, New South Wales, Australia
- King George Hospital, Visakhapatnam, Visakhapatnam, Andhra Pradesh, India
