= I. Bhooshana Rao =

Indian scientist (1914–1976)

Idupuganti Bhooshana Rao
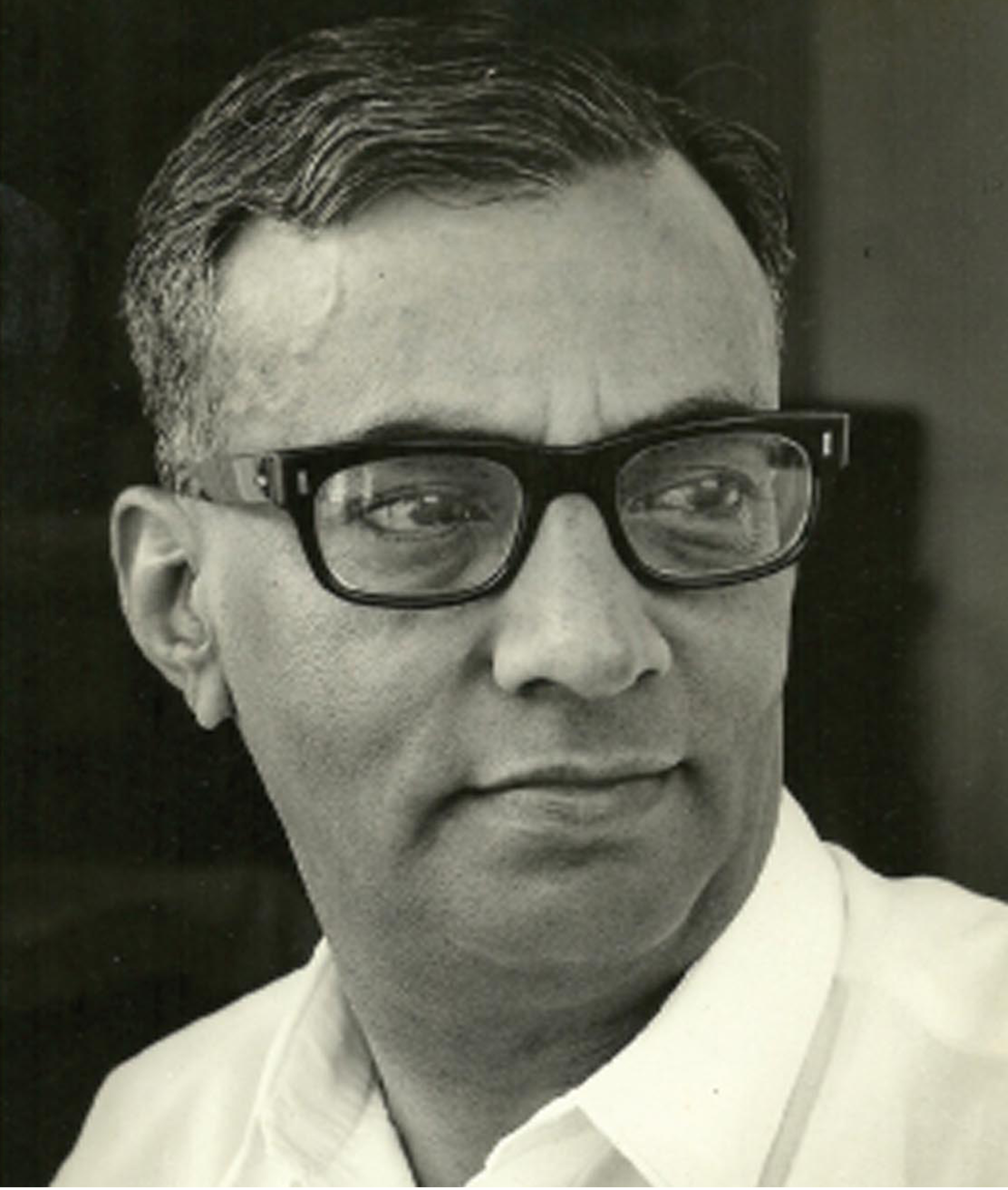
- Born: 6 January 1914; Dornakal, Telangana, India
- Died: 3 May 1976 (aged 62)
- Known for: Expert opinion of Deendayal Upadhyaya case
- Medical career
- Profession: Doctor, educationist and author
- Sub-specialties: Forensic Pathologist

Idupuganti Bhooshana Rao (6 January 1914 – 3 May 1976) was a leading figure in forensic medicine in India. He was the Founding-President of the Indian Academy of Forensic Medicine established in 1972. He was born in Dornakal, Andhra Pradesh (now Telangana), India.

== Education ==
He obtained his M.B.B.S degree in 1940; he also obtained an M.D (Pathology) in 1945 from the Andhra Medical College, Visakhapatnam. Later, he underwent postgraduate training in the United Kingdom with a Colombo Plan Fellowship in 1956.

== Career ==
- He served as Professor and Head of Forensic Medicine at Madras Medical College and Stanley Medical College and City Police Surgeon, Osmania Medical College, Superintendent of Police Hospital and City Police Surgeon.
- He also served as Post-graduate Professor of the upgraded Department of Forensic Medicine, Osmania Medical College, Hyderabad
- After retirement from Government service, he served as Professor and Head, Department of Forensic Medicine, Jawaharlal Nehru Medical College, Belgaum (Karnataka) from 15 July 1974 till he died on 3 May 1976 at Hyderabad, while he was on a visit to conduct a post-graduate examination.

== Offices held ==
- Member of the Technical Committee and Deputy Commissioner of Department of Family Planning, Ministry of Health.
- Member Central Advisory Committee of Forensic Sciences, Ministry of Home Affairs and Member of the Central Medico-legal Advisory Committee of Forensic Sciences, Ministry of Health.
- Chief Editor, Journal of the Indian Academy of Forensic Sciences (1962–66).
- Founder-President of the Indian Academy of Forensic Medicine, bringing together for the first time doctors, scientists, lawyers, criminologists and judges in a professional forum (1972–1976).
- The Deccan Club instituted an annual bridge tournament for the Dr. I. Bhooshana Rao Memorial Trophy to commemorate his memory.

== Famous murder cases ==
Among his notable cases were the Deendayal Upadhyaya case, Indraprastha Estate case, Lajpatnagar Police Station case, Meena Tandon case and the Tank Bund Double Murder Case. He was also asked by the Government of India to investigate the untimely demise of Lal Bahadur Shastri, then Prime Minister of India.

== Publications ==
- Medico-legal Problems, revised chapter on Sexual Offences in J.P. Modi's Medical Jurisprudence(1959).
- Survey Report on medico-legal practices in India (co-author, published by Directorate of Health Services, Government of India, 1964).
- Fire arms and fire arm injuries (with M. Jauhari and M.N. Supanekar, published by Government of India, 1965).
- T. Bhaskara Menon. Born 4 May 1898. Died 12 September 1948 by I. Bhooshana Rao. Journal of Pathology. 61(3):478-483, July 1949.
