= Mangalore (disambiguation) =

Mangaluru is the chief port city of the Indian state of Karnataka.

Mangaluru or Mangalore also refer to:

== Places ==
- related to the city of Mangalore:
  - Mangaluru taluk
  - Mangalore Central railway station
  - Mangalore Junction railway station
  - Mangalore University
- Mangalore, Bagalkot, a village in Badami taluka, Karnataka, India
- Mangalur block, revenue block in Cuddalore district, Tamil Nadu, India
- Mangalore, Victoria, a town in Australia
- Mangalore, Tasmania, a rural locality in Australia

== Constituencies ==
- Mangalore Lok Sabha constituency
- Mangalore Assembly constituency
- Mangalore, Tamil Nadu Assembly constituency

== Other uses ==
- Mangalores, a fictional alien race in The Fifth Element
- Mangalore Anantha Pai (1931–2023), power engineer and academic
- Mangalore Gopal Kini (died 1952), orthopedic surgeon
- Mangalore (1811 ship), a country ship
- Mangalore tiles, Indian roofing tiles

== See also ==
- Kudla (disambiguation), name for Mangalore in the local Tulu language
- Kodial (disambiguation), name for Mangalore in the local Konkani language
- Mangalorean, something of, from or related to Mangalore or the region of South Canara
  - Mangaloreans
  - Mangalorean Catholics
- Manglaur, town in Uttarakhand, India
