= Sonti =

- Current region: Andhra Pradesh
- Origin: India

Sonti is a Telugu Brahmin surname found predominantly in India.

Notable bearers of the Sonti name include:

- Geetha Madhuri, Artist, Singer
- Ramesh Venkata Sonti, Chief Scientist of CCMB (government biotechnology research establishment)
- Sonti Dakshinamurthy, Director of Health of the Government of Andhra Pradesh, World Health Organization malaria advisor, health deputy director of Singapore, professor of Social and Preventive Medicine
- Sonti Kamesam, inventor, entrepreneur
- Sir S. V. Ramamurthy KCIE Governor of Bombay Presidency

== See also ==
- Xhosa people
- Telugu language
