= Transactions of the Royal Society (disambiguation) =

Transactions of the Royal Society refers to the Philosophical Transactions of the Royal Society. It may also refer to:

- Transactions of the Royal Society of Edinburgh
- Transactions and Proceedings of the Royal Society of New Zealand
- Transactions of the Royal Society of Tropical Medicine and Hygiene
