= Kudla =

Kudla may refer to:

- Kudla (surname)
- Kudla, South Australia, outer northern suburb of Adelaide
  - Kudla railway station
- Mangalore, city in India, known as Kudla in the Tulu language

== See also ==
- Mangalore (disambiguation)
- Kudla Cafe, a 2016 Indian film
