= IAFM =

IAFM may refer to:

- Indian Academy of Forensic Medicine
- Intake Air-Fuel Module, from Proton CamPro engine
- International Academy of Film and Media, see Cinema of Bangladesh
- Israeli Air Force Museum
- Italian Air Force Museum
- Indian Air Force Museum, Palam
- IAFM, call sign for Italian destroyer Francesco Mimbelli (D 561)
- Inter-allied Fellowship of Medicine, former name for Fellowship of Postgraduate Medicine founded by Sir William Osler
