= T. Bhaskara Menon =

Indian pathologist

- Born: 4 May 1898
- Died: 12 September 1948 (aged 50)
- Citizenship: India
- Awards: Straits Settlements Gold Medal
- Scientific career
- Fields: Pathology
- Institutions: Andhra Medical College

Professor Thotakat Bhaskara Menon shortly T. Bhaskara Menon M.D., D.Sc., M.R.C.P. (born 4 May 1898 – died 12 September 1948) was Professor of Pathology and Principal of Andhra Medical College.

He has done M.D. from Madras. He was Principal of Andhra Medical College from 1945 to 1948. He was the second Indian to hold this position after Dr. T. S. Tirumurti in 1930.

In memory of his professional services, the Extension block of Pathology department in Andhra Medical College was renamed as Dr. Bhaskara Menon's of School of Pathology in 1948. Dr. Bhaskara Menon Memorial prize is awarded annually to meritorious students selected on the basis of a competitive examination.

The Senatus Academicus of the University of Edinburgh awarded the Straits Settlements Gold Medal to Thottakat Bhaskara Menon, for the excellence of his thesis on "Pathological Studies on Splenomegaly" on 11 February 1938.

He wrote a book entitled "An Introduction to Tropical Pathology" (Calcutta, 1931) intended for undergraduate and postgraduate students of Tropical Medicine.

== Bibliography ==
- A haemangeioblastoma of the adrenal gland. T. Bhaskara Menon, D. R. Annamalai, Journal of Pathology and Bacteriology, Volume 39, Issue 3, pages 591–594, November 1934.
- The nature of the donovan body of granuloma inguinale. T. Bhaskara Menon, T.K. Krishnaswami, Transactions of the Royal Society of Tropical Medicine and Hygiene, 29 June 1935, Volume 29, Issue 1, Pages 65–72.
- Venous splenomegaly: A study in experimental portal congestion. T. Bhaskara Menon, Journal of Pathology and Bacteriology, Volume 46, Issue 2, 357–365, January 1938.
- The splenic reaction in kala-azar. T. Bhaskara Menon, Transactions of the Royal Society of Tropical Medicine and Hygiene. 29 June 1939, Volume 33, Issue 1, Pages 75–86.
- Tissue reactions to Cysticercus cellulosae in man. T. Bhaskara Menon, and G.D Veliath, Transactions of the Royal Society of Tropical Medicine and Hygiene. 20 March 1940. Volume 33, Issue 5, Pages 537–544.
- Lizard filariasis. An experimental study. T. Bhaskara Menon, B. Ramamurti, D. Sundarasiva Rao, Transactions of the Royal Society of Tropical Medicine and Hygiene. May 1944, Volume 37, Issue 6, Pages 373–386.
- Tuberculosis of Myocardium causing Complete Heart Block. T. Bhaskara Menon and C. K. Prasada Rao, American Journal of Pathology, November 1945, pp: 1193.
