= P. Kutumbaiah =

Professor of medicine in India

P. Kutumbaiah, born as Pudipeddy Kutumbaiah M.D., F.R.C.P. was professor of Medicine in India.

Dr P. Kutumbiah was born in India in 1892. He served in the Indian Medical Service and worked as a lecturer in chemistry and Surgery for the Madras Medical Service. He received M.D. from Madras Medical College in 1931. In 1930 he obtained membership to the Royal College of Physicians in London. He became professor of Medicine at Andhra Medical College (1938-45) and later became professor of Medicine in Madras.

Besides the practice of medicine he was always interested in the history of medicine, particularly ancient Indian medicine. In 1947, along with some friends interested in this subject, he founded a society for the study of the history of medicine. In 1953, this society was converted into The Indian Association of the History of Medicine, and he was elected as its first President.

He was professor of Medicine at Andhra Medical College. In his memory, the college instituted a Gold Medal awarded annually to the best student in Clinical Medicine.

He wrote a book on Indian Medical History titled "Ancient Indian Medicine" published by Orient Longmans, Bombay in 1962. Foreword is written by Dr. S. Radhakrishnan. He dedicated this book to his brother P. Chenchaiah. It was revised and published in 1969 and subsequently reprinted in 1974 and 1999.
