= Seshagiri Mallampati =

Indian anesthesiologist (1941–2026)

Seshagiri Rao Mallampati
- Born: 1941; Patchalatadiparru, Guntur district, Madras Province, British India
- Died: 9 February 2026 (aged 85); U.S.
- Education: Andhra Medical College (MBBS)
- Occupation: Anesthesiologist
- Known for: Mallampati score
- Title: Doctor

Seshagiri Rao Mallampati (Telugu: మల్లంపాటి శేషగిరిరావు, ISO: Mallampāṭi Śēṣagirirāvu, Telugu: [malːampaːʈi çeːʂagiɾiɾaːʋu]; 1941 – 9 February 2026) was an Indian anesthesiologist. He was best known for proposing the eponymous Mallampati score in 1985, a non-invasive method to assess the ease of endotracheal intubation.

== Life and career ==
Mallampati was born in Madras Province, British India in 1941. In 1968, he studied medicine at Andhra Medical College, the oldest medical school in the state. In 1971, he emigrated to the United States and began his training in anesthesiology at the Lahey Clinic in Boston, Massachusetts.

In 1983, Mallampati published a letter describing a difficult intubation in a female patient whose mouth could open widely but whose tongue obstructed view of the faucial pillars and uvula. He hypothesised that the size of the tongue was a significant factor in predicting difficult laryngoscope usage since a large tongue would likely occlude the oropharynx. In 1985, alongside his colleagues, he published a paper in the Journal of the Canadian Anesthesia Society that involved 210 patients and studied the correlation between decreased visualisation of the soft palate, faucial pillars and uvula, and its association with the difficulty of intubation. The study showed an inverse correlation and Mallampati proposed an eponymous classification to determine the ease of intubation.

He later worked at the Brigham and Women’s Hospital for the remainder of his career. In 2017, he retired from medical practice.

Mallampati died on 9 February 2026, at the age of 85.

== Notable publications ==
- Mallampati, SR (1983). "Clinical sign to predict difficult tracheal intubation (hypothesis)". Can Anaesth Soc J. 30: 316–7. doi:10.1007/bf03013818. PMID 6336553.
- Mallampati, SR; Gatt, SP; Gugino, LD; et al. (July 1985). "A clinical sign to predict difficult tracheal intubation: a prospective study". Can Anaesth Soc J. 32: 429–34. doi:10.1007/bf03011357. PMID 4027773.
