= P. Brahmayya Sastry =

Professor of physiology in India

Professor Podili Brahmayya Sastry (Telugu: పొదిలి బ్రహ్మయ్య శాస్త్రి) M.B.B.S., M.Sc., Ph.D., M.A.M.S. was an eminent professor of Physiology in India.

He was the principal of Andhra Medical College between 1964 and 1966.

Brahmayya Sastry did frontline research during his long tenure of 45 years in Andhra Medical College and worked for more than 16 years even after retirement. His main focus was on Neurophysiology. He published over 80 research papers. His work on acetylcholine synthesis, storage and release is recognized internationally. He was elected Fellow of the Indian Academy of Sciences in 1978. He was instrumental in getting funds for the development of the College.

Andhra Medical College Old Student's Association (AMCOSA) was formed by the hearty efforts of Sastry and Dr. C. Vyaghreswarudu and the first AMCOSA day was celebrated in 1967.

Professor P. Brahmayya Sastry Memorial Oration was instituted by Andhra Medical College in Visakhapatnam. Many distinguished scientists and Noble laureates were invited to lecture and presented the Oration medal annually.

== Publications ==
A partial list:

1. Birks RI, Macintosh FC, Sastry PB. Pharmacological inhibition of acetylcholine synthesis. Nature. 1956 Nov 24;178(4543):1181.

2. Grafstein B, Sastry PB. Some preliminary electrophysiological studies on chronic neuronally isolated cerebral cortex. Electroencephalogr Clin Neurophysiol. 1957 Nov;9(4):723-5.

3. Macintosh FC, Birks RI, Sastry PB. Mode of action of an inhibitor of acetylcholine synthesis. Neurology. 1958 Apr;8(Suppl 1):90-1.

4. Nirmala G, Brahmayya Sastry P. Neuro-muscular depressant action of pindolol in comparison with propranolol and procaine. Arch Int Pharmacodyn Ther. 1979 Apr;238(2):196-205.

5. Raghavan KS, Sastry PB. Effects of temperature on acetylcholine synthesis and release in perfused human placenta. Indian J Med Res. 1970 Dec;58(12):1718-23.

6. Raghavan KS, Sastry PB. Acetylcholine synthesis and release by incubated human placental mince. Indian J Med Res. 1970 Dec;58(12):1712-7.

7. Ratnam AV, Sastry PB, Satyanarayana BV. Ascorbic acid and melanogenesis. Br J Dermatol. 1977 Aug;97(2):201-4.

8. Reddi YV, Sastry PB, Ramadas G. The effects of excess calcium on the acetylcholine turnover from the minced and incubated rat's brain. Indian J Physiol Pharmacol. 1978 Jul-Sep;22(3):285-92.

9. Sastry PB, Krishnamurty A. Acetylcholine synthesis and release in isolated and perfused single cotyledon of human placenta. Indian J Med Res. 1978 Nov;68:867-79.

10. Satyanarayanamurthi GV, Sastry PB. A preliminary scientific investigation into some of the unusual physiological manifestations acquired as a result of yogic practices in India. Wien Z Nervenheilkd Grenzgeb. 1958;15(1-4):239-49.

11. Vyaghreswarudu C, Sastry PB. PLACENTAL IMPLANTS IN POLIOMYELITIS. Indian Pract. 1965 Jul;18:537-9.
