= Government Hospital For Mental Care =

Coordinates: 17.728367°N 83.333501°E

- Government of Andhra Pradesh

Geography
- Location: Chinna Waltair, Visakhapatnam, India

Organisation
- Care system: Public
- Type: Speciality
- Affiliated university: N.T.R. Health University

Services
- Emergency department: yes
- Beds: 300

History
- Opened: 1871

Government Hospital For Mental Care is run by Government of Andhra Pradesh located at Chinna Waltair, Visakhapatnam, India.

== About ==
The Government Hospital for Mental Care was one of the earliest mental care hospitals. It was established in the year of 1871 with 94 patients. In the present day (2019) it has 300 beds, which will be enhanced to 450.
