= Kakarla Subba Rao =

Indian doctor (1925–2021)

- Born: 25 January 1925; Krishna district, Madras Presidency, British India
- Died: 16 April 2021 (aged 96); Hyderabad, Telangana, India
- Education: Andhra Medical College (MBBS); New York University (MS)
- Occupations: Radiologist; hospital administrator
- Medical career
- Awards: Padma Shri (2000)

Kakarla Subba Rao (25 January 1925 – 16 April 2021) was an Indian radiologist who served as the first director of Nizam's Institute of Medical Sciences, Hyderabad. For his contributions to the field of medicine, Rao was conferred Padma Shri in 2000, the fourth highest civilian award by the Government of India. He was also the founder and president of the Telugu Association of North America.

== Early life and education ==
Rao was born on 25 January 1925 to a middle class Telugu-speaking Kamma family in Pedamuttevi, a small village in Krishna District of present day Andhra Pradesh, India. He completed his schooling at S. R. High School in Challapalli, followed by studies at The Hindu College, in Machilipatnam between 1937 and 1944. He completed his MBBS from Andhra Medical College of the Andhra University in 1950. After obtaining his medical degree he interned at the K. G. Hospital in Vizag (now Visakhapatnam) in 1951. He then went to the United States for higher studies on a scholarship, where he did his residency at the Bronx Hospital and completed his MS in radiology from New York University. During this time, he also worked as a night technician at the Bronx Hospital to pay his tuition. Between 1954 and 1956, he was a special fellow of radiology at hospitals in New York and Baltimore. He cleared the American Board exam in Radiology in 1955.

== Career ==
After his residency in the United States, Rao returned to India and worked as a radiologist at Osmania Medical College and again went back to the United States to complete his fellowship. His decision to move back to the United States was prompted by an incident in 1969 where his house was burnt during the Telangana Agitation. He joined Montefiore Medical Center where he completed his fellowship, and went on to become an assistant professor, and later a professor. He went on to serve as a professor of radiology at the Albert Einstein College of Medicine, a private medical school in the Bronx, New York. During this time, he was also a member of the International Skeletal Society and served as a member of the society's editorial board. Rao was the founder and first president of the Telugu Association of North America, an umbrella organization for Telugu speakers in the United States.

On the call of late Andhra Pradesh Chief Minister Nandamuri Taraka Rama Rao, Subba Rao returned to India in 1986 and joined Nizam Orthopaedic Hospital. He did much to improve it, making it into a premier medical institution modeled on the All India Institutes of Medical Sciences. It is now called the Nizam Institute of Medical Sciences. In the initial years, he did not draw any salary for his work, while he established changes in the institution. Recalling his experience later, he would note that the hospital had poor equipment and infrastructure and no CAT scanner or pathology labs. From 1985 and 1990, Rao served as its first director, and again between 1997 and 2004, before retiring. His efforts established the hospital as a prestigious medical institute across patient service, education, training and research while focusing on affordability and access. He was also the Chairman at Padmavathi Medical College for Women and had also served as the chairman of KIMS Medical Research Foundation, International Educational Academy, and the Kakarla Subba Rao Radiological Educational Services in Hyderabad. He had also served as the personal doctor of the former chief minister of Andhra Pradesh, N. T. Rama Rao.

The Government of India honoured Rao with the Padma Shri on 26 January 2000, in recognition of his valuable contributions to the field of medicine.

== Death ==
Rao died on 16 April 2021 in Secunderabad at the Krishna Institute of Medical Sciences due to age-related ailments. He had been admitted to the hospital a month earlier and was undergoing treatment. He was aged 96.

== Books ==
- Subba Rao, Dr Karkala (2013). A Doctors Story of Life & Death. Prabhat Prakashan. ISBN 978-8184301809.
- Subba Rao, Dr Karkala (2003). Diagnostic radiology and imaging. New Delhi: Jaypee Bros. Medical Publishers. ISBN 81-8061-069-1. OCLC 601059826.
- Subba Rao, Dr Kakarla (2019). An Atlas of Hand Radiographs in Pediatrics: Kalajyothi Publishers.
