= Vulimiri Ramalingaswami =

Indian pathologist

V. Ramalingaswami
- Born: 8 August 1921; Srikakulam, Madras Presidency, British India
- Died: 28 May 2001 (aged 79)
- Citizenship: India
- Education: Andhra Medical College
- Scientific career
- Fields: Pathology
- Workplaces: All India Institute of Medical Sciences, Indian Council of Medical Research, Indian National Science Academy

Vulimiri Ramalingaswami (8 August 1921 – 28 May 2001) was an Indian medical scientist, pathologist and medical writer. His pioneering research on nutrition got him elected to the National Academy of Sciences, Russian Academy of Medical Sciences and the Royal Society of London.

He was also the director of All India Institute of Medical Sciences and later on director general of Indian Council of Medical Research and President of the Indian National Science Academy. He was regarded as a teacher of international repute in the areas of nutritional deficiency. He was honoured with the Shanti Swarup Bhatnagar Award by the Council of Scientific and Industrial Research in 1967 and Padma Shri in 1969, Padma Bhushan and Padma Vibhushan by Government of India, KK Birla National Award, and Basanti Devi Amirchand Prize (ICMR) in 1966. The Leon Bernard Foundation Award was presented to him by Sir Harold Walter, president of the 1976 World Health Assembly.

== Early life ==
He was born in a Telugu speaking family in Srikakulam, Andhra Pradesh to V. Gumpaswami and V. Sundaramma. His father was a government servant. He received his medical education from Andhra Medical College, Visakhapatnam, and then went on a scholarship to Oxford.

He became the Director of the All India Institute of Medical Sciences (AIIMS) and served the premier institute for 10 years 1969–1979). He became the Director General of Indian Council of Medical Research, New Delhi. In remembrance of his great service, the Indian Government decided to name the Indian Council of Medical Research building after him (Ramalingaswami Bhavan). He was also the President of the Indian National Science Academy. He was Special Advisor to the World Health Organization and President of the National Institute of Immunology.

He served as Chair of the International Task Force on Health Research for Development in Geneva (1990–93). He was Secretary-General of the International Conference on Nutrition in Rome in December 1992. He was appointed to the Board of Governors of the International Development Research Centre (IDRC), Canada, in 1999.

== Fellowships ==
- Indian Academy of Sciences.
- Indian National Science Academy.
- National Academy of Medical Sciences.
- National Academy of Sciences, USA^{7}.
- Royal College of Pathologists (London), UK.
- Royal College of Physicians, UK.
- Russian Academy of Medical Sciences
- Royal Society of London, March 1986

== Selected publications ==
1. Ramalingaswami, V.; Menon, P. S.; Venkatachalam, P. S. (1948). "Infantile pellagra; report on five cases". The Indian Physician. 7 (9): 229–237. PMID 18099153.
2. Ramalingaswami, V.; Sinclair, H. M. (1953). "The relation of deficiencies of vitamin a and of essential fatty acids to follicular hyperkeratosis in the rat". The British Journal of Dermatology. 65 (1): 1–22. doi:10.1111/j.1365-2133.1953.tb13159.x. PMID 13018993. S2CID 26835831.
3. Ramalingaswami, V., Sriramachari, S., and Patwardhan, V. N., Ind. J. Med. Sci., 8, 433 (1954).
4. Ramalingaswami, V.; Leach, E. H.; Sriramachari, S. (1955). "Ocular structure in vitamin a deficiency in the monkey". Quarterly Journal of Experimental Physiology and Cognate Medical Sciences. 40 (4): 337–347. doi:10.1113/expphysiol.1955.sp001134. PMID 13280814.
5. Ramalingaswami, V.; Subramanian, T. A.; Deo, M. G. (1961). "The aetiology of Himalayan endemic goitre". Lancet. 1 (7181): 791–794. doi:10.1016/S0140-6736(61)90118-0. PMID 13739307.
6. Ramalingaswami, V. (1964). "Perspectives in Protein Malnutrition". Nature. 201 (4919): 546–551. Bibcode:1964Natur.201..546R. doi:10.1038/201546a0. PMID 14160638. S2CID 5893960.
7. Ramalingaswami, V. (1969). "Interface of protein nutrition and medicine in the tropics". Lancet. 2 (7623): 733–736. doi:10.1016/s0140-6736(69)90440-1. PMID 4186178.
8. Ramalingaswami, V.; Nayak, N. C. (1970). "Liver disease in India". Progress in Liver Diseases. 3: 222–235. PMID 4910369.
9. Ramalingaswami, V. (1973). "Endemic goiter in Southeast Asia. New clothes on an old body". Annals of Internal Medicine. 78 (2): 277–283. doi:10.7326/0003-4819-78-2-277. PMID 4265088.
10. Ramalingaswami, V. (1977). "Knowledge and action in the control of vitamin a deficiency". Annals of the New York Academy of Sciences. 300 (1): 210–220. Bibcode:1977NYASA.300..210R. doi:10.1111/j.1749-6632.1977.tb19319.x. PMID 279269. S2CID 44343761.
11. Ramalingaswami, V.; Purcell, R. (1988). "Waterborne Non-A, Non-B Hepatitis". The Lancet. 331 (8585): 571–573. doi:10.1016/S0140-6736(88)91362-1. PMID 2894501. S2CID 28664017.
12. V. Ramalingaswami, Prevention of Micronutrient Deficiencies: Tools for Policymakers and Public Health Workers, The National Academies Press (1998).
13. V. Ramalingaswami, The Public health imperative of permanent elimination of iodine deficiency, 2000.
