= A. Ranganadha Rao =

Indian urologist (1930–2014)

- Born: 11 April 1930; Pithapuram, Andhra Pradesh, India
- Died: 18 December 2014 (aged 84)
- Education: Andhra Medical College; Christian Medical College
- Scientific career
- Fields: Urology
- Workplaces: Andhra Medical College; Osmania Medical College

A. Ranganadha Rao (born 11 April 1930) was an Indian urologist. He is the first urologist from Andhra Pradesh and the first person to perform a kidney transplantation in Andhra Pradesh.

== Career ==
He was born in Pithapuram, East Godavari district. After primary education there, he joined P. R. College, Kakinada for Intermediate course.

He graduated from Andhra Medical College of the Andhra University, Visakhapatnam in 1952. He won the Anderson Gold Medal in anatomy and the Dr. Bhaskar Menon Prize in Pathology during his medical career. He joined Andhra Pradesh Government Health Services in 1956. He did post-graduation (M.S.) in surgery from the same college in 1962. He continued in government service. He earned a master's degree in urology from Christian Medical College, Vellore in 1969. He is one of the first Urologists of the country and the first to specialize in Urology from the state of Andhra Pradesh.

He worked as Assistant Professor of Surgery at Andhra Medical College between 1962 and 1970. He was Professor of Urology at Osmania Medical College between 1970 and 1983, and an Honorary Consultant in Urology at Nizam's Institute of Medical Sciences. He established the Urology department at Osmania Medical College in 1970 and started Post-graduation Courses in Urology in 1980. His team performed a kidney transplantation at Osmania General Hospital in 1982, the first in Andhra Pradesh.

He had more than 25 years of experience in undergraduate and postgraduate teaching. He was an examiner to post-graduate students in Urology at many Indian Universities. He presented about 35 oral presentations in National Urology conferences. He published about 12 scientific papers in Indian Journal of Urology. He chaired several scientific sessions in national conferences of Urological Society of India.

He held the positions of honorary secretary, vice-president, president-elect and president of the Urological Society of India from 1982 to 1989.

He founded Hyderabad Institute of Urology in 1994 along with some other urologists in Hyderabad.

He was awarded the Doctor of Science (Honoris Cause) by Dr. NTR University of Health Sciences at 13th Annual Convocation on 13 March 2009.

He died in 2014.

== Orations ==
- He delivered the "Dr. H. S. Bhat Oration" and spoke on Endourology in 1996.
- Dr. Yella Prasad Memorial Oration in 1985.
- Dr. Hemadri Sarcar Memorial Oration in Urology in 1990
- Dr. Bhaskar Reddy Endowment Oration in 1996.
