= Chinna Waltair =

- Neighbourhood
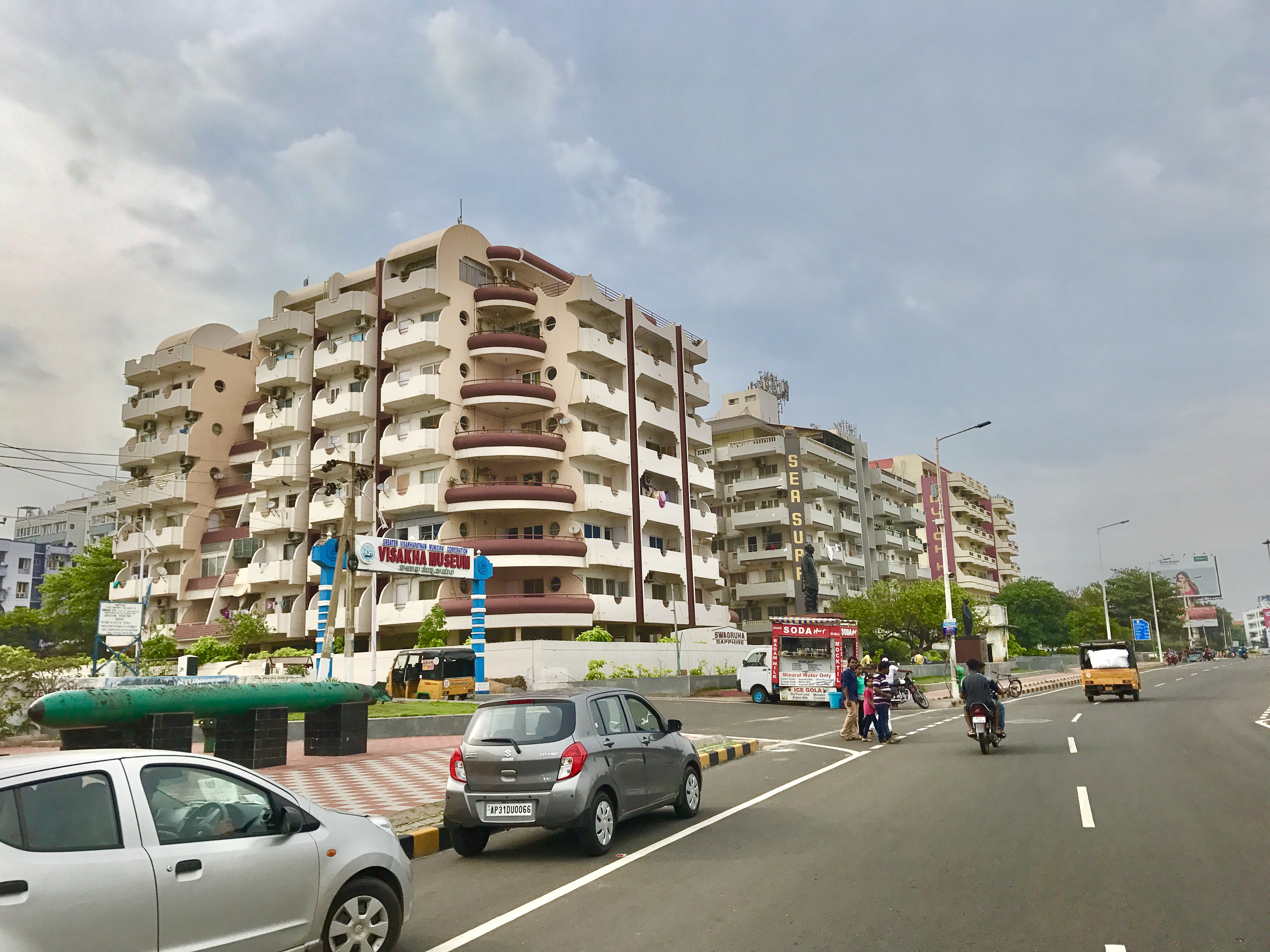
- Visakha Museum entry near Chinna Waltair

- Location Visakhapatnam
- Coordinates: 17.725102°N 83.333265°E
- Country: India
- State: Andhra Pradesh
- District: Visakhapatnam

Government
  - Body: Greater Visakhapatnam Municipal Corporation

Languages
  - Official: Telugu
- Time zone: UTC+5:30 (IST)
- PIN: 530017
- Vehicle registration: AP-31

Chinna Waltair is a coastal neighborhood in Visakhapatnam in the Indian state of Andhra Pradesh, 5km away from the city's central neighborhood, Dwaraka Nagar. The area is governed by the Greater Visakhapatnam Municipal Corporation. The neighborhood offers tourist attractions along the Beach Road highway, including the Visakha Museum of historical artifacts from the Uttarandhra region and the Victory at Sea Memorial dedicated to the Indian Navy.

== Transport ==
APSRTC routes

Route number	Start	End	Via
14	Venkojipalem	Old Head Post Office	Appughar, Chinnawaltair, Siripuram, Jagadamba Centre, Town Kotharoad
210	Ravindra Nagar	Gantyada HB Colony	Hanumanthuwaka, Appughar, MVP Colony, Pedawaltair, Siripuram, RK Beach, Jagadamba Centre, Town Kotharoad, Convent, Scindia, Malkapuram, New Gajuwaka, Pedagantyada
