= Kodial =

Kodial may refer to:

- Mangalore, city in Karnataka, India, known as Kodial in Konkani language
  - Microhyla kodial, the Mangaluru narrow-mouthed frog

== See also ==
- Mangalore (disambiguation)
