= Dr. Rednam Surya Prasadrao Government Regional Eye Hospital =

Coordinates: 17.730252°N 83.311694°E

- Government of Andhra Pradesh

Geography
- Location: Rama Talkies Road, Visakhapatnam, India

Organisation
- Care system: Public
- Type: Ophthalmology
- Affiliated university: N.T.R. Health University

Services
- Emergency department: yes
- Beds: 200

History
- Founded: 1981

Government Regional Eye Hospital, also known as Dr. Rednam Surya Prasadrao Government Regional Eye Hospital, is located in Rama Talkies Road, Visakhapatnam. It is the only government eye hospital serving Andhra Pradesh. This hospital is named for famous eye surgeon Rednam Surya Prasad.
