= Andhra Medical College =

Government medical college in Visakhapatnam, India

Coordinates: 17.70422°N 83.29976°E

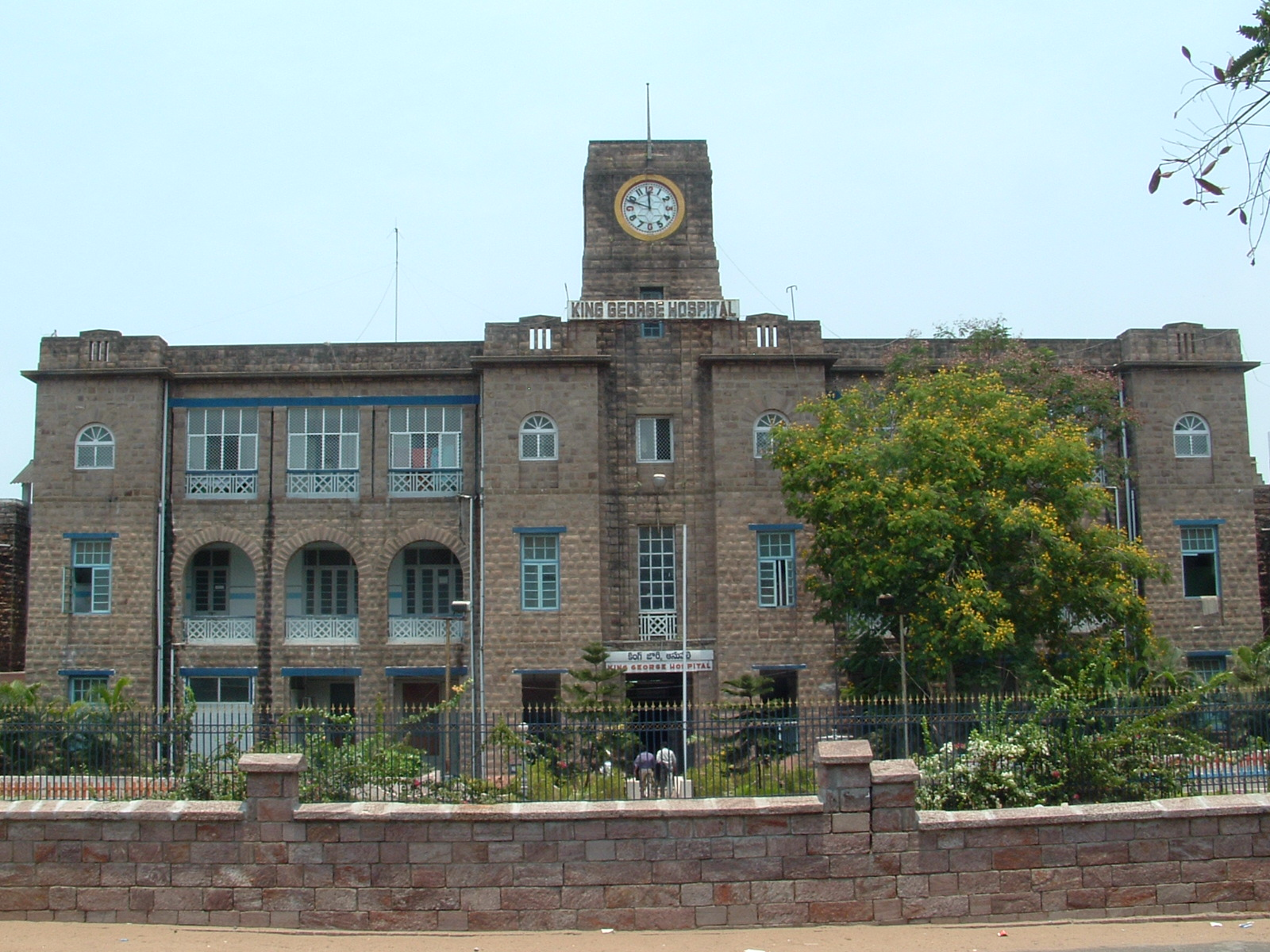
- Motto: Ne Quid Nimis (Let there be nothing in Excess)
- Type: Public medical school
- Established: 19 July 1923; 103 years ago
- Affiliations: Dr. NTR University of Health Sciences, NMC
- Principal: K. V. S. M. Sandhya Devi
- Undergraduates: 250 per year (MBBS)
- Postgraduates: 212 per year + Super Specialty seats 23 per year
- Location: Maharanipeta, Visakhapatnam, Andhra Pradesh, 530002, India., Visakhapatnam
- Campus: Urban
- Website: amc.edu.in

Andhra Medical College is a public medical college in Visakhapatnam, Andhra Pradesh, India. It is affiliated to Dr. NTR University of Health Sciences. It is the oldest medical college in Andhra Pradesh and the sixth oldest medical college in India. It is recognised by the National Medical Commission.

== About ==
Andhra Medical College emblem was designed by F. J. Anderson, the first principal.

In the year 2020, Sudhakar, the then principal of AMC, had disclosed the modernisation plan for the hospital. A plan is being designed to have vertical buildings which will accommodate all the departments of the college. A sum of ₹120 crores had been earmarked for this purpose. It is proposed to demolish the Panagal building in the campus and a seven-storey building is planned to be constructed in its place. The building is proposed to accommodate all departments from anatomy to community medicine and even pre-clinical and para-clinical departments.

== Departments ==
Department of Nephrology, established by T. Ravi Raju, who has been instrumental in developing the Kidney transplantation facility in the hospital. and department of Neurosurgery was started in 1956. It is the first neurosurgical unit of the united Andhra Pradesh.

== Hostels ==
The Andhra Medical College provides separate hostels for men, women, house-surgeons and postgraduates.

== Notable people ==
- T. Prabhakar — first vice-Chancellor of Uttar Pradesh University of Medical Sciences
- Hilda Mary Lazarus — principal of AMC and superintendent of KGH
- M. G. Kini — professor of orthopaedics
- B. V. Satyanarayana (1927–2005) — professor of dermatology
- V. Ramalingaswami (1921–2001) — Eminent Nutritional Scientist and recipient of Padma Bhushan
- P. Brahmayya Sastry — professor of physiology
- P. Kutumbaiah — professor of medicine
- I. Bhooshana Rao — forensic pathologist and academic
- Kakarla Subba Rao — professor of radiology and director, Nizams Institute of Medical Sciences
- L. Suryanarayana — professor of surgery, principal of AMC and vice-Chancellor, NTR University of Health Sciences
- P. Siva Reddy (1920–2005) — professor of ophthalmology and director of Sarojini Devi Eye Hospital
- Ponduri Venkata Ramana Rao (1917–2005) — professor of microbiology and director of Institute of Preventive Medicine
- Sripada Pinakapani — general physician, Sangeetha Kalanidhi and recipient of Padma Bhushan
- Sonti Dakshina Murthy (1899–1975) — professor of social and preventive medicine
- A. Ranganadha Rao — the first urologist of Andhra Pradesh
- Raman Viswanathan — chest physician and Padma Bhushan awardee
- Seshagiri Mallampati — anaesthetist, best known for proposing the eponymous Mallampati score
- OA Sarma - Physician Specialising in Tuberculosis & Chest diseases; Former Superintendent of the Tuberculosis & Chest Hospital, Hyderabad & Professor at Osmania Medical College, Hyderabad. Several professional orations & lectures have been instituted in his name by medical organisations, including the Indian Chest Society and the TB Association of India.

== Gallery ==
Golden Jubilee Commemoration Pylon,Andhra Medical College.

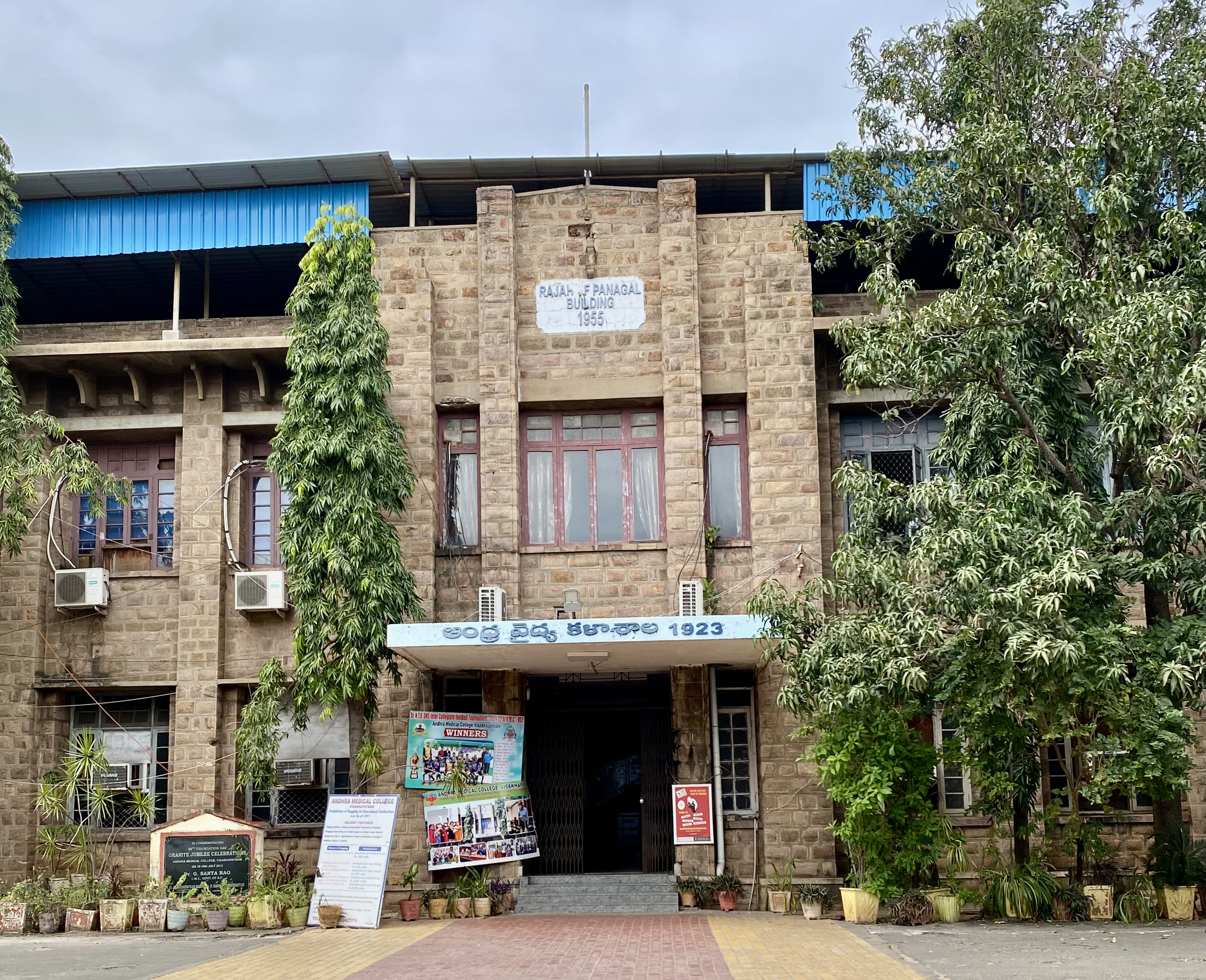
Andhra Medical College

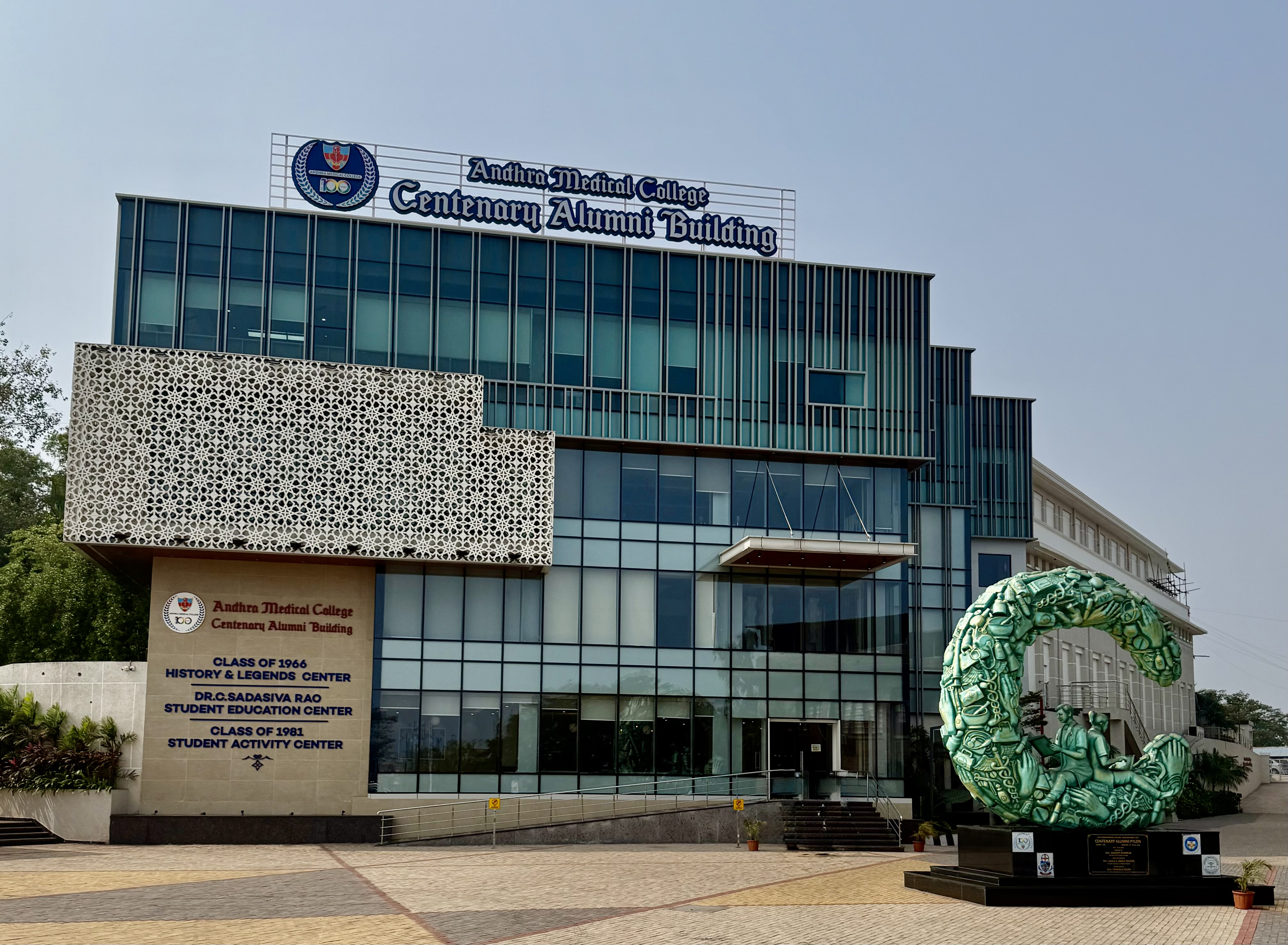
Alumni Building

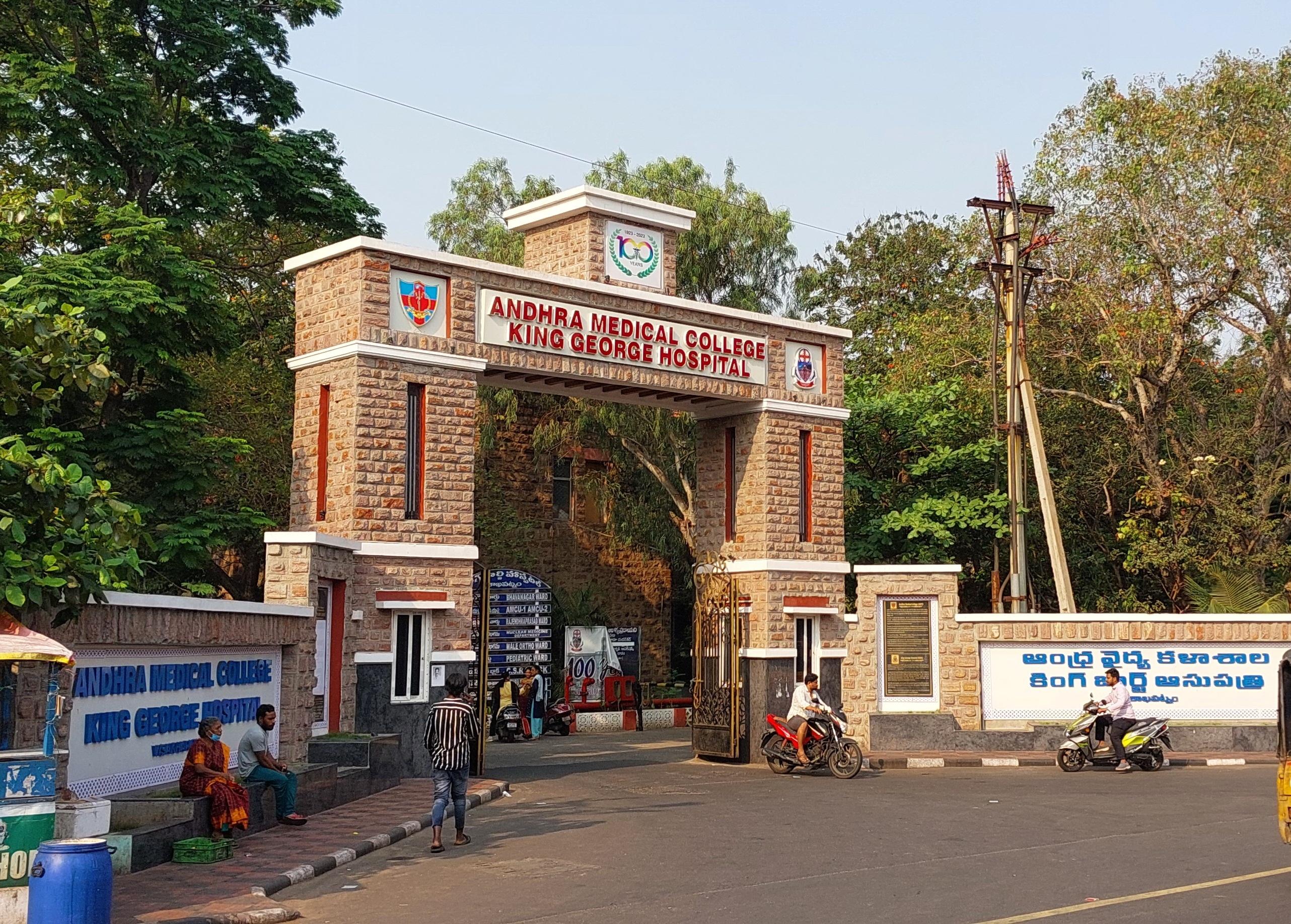
Main entrance of Andhra Medical College & Hospital

ఆంధ్ర వైద్యకళాశాల, మౌలిక వైద్యశాస్త్రముల విభాగ ప్రవేశద్వారము (AMC Basic Medical Sciences Entrance)

ఆంధ్ర వైద్యకళాశాల, మౌలిక వైద్యశాస్త్ర విద్యాలయము (AMC Institute of Basic Medical Sciences)

ఆంధ్ర వైద్యకళాశాల శరీర నిర్మాణశాస్త్ర విభాగము (AMC Department of Anatomy)

ఆంధ్ర వైద్యకళాశాల, శరీరధర్మశాస్త్ర విభాగము (AMC Department of Physiology)

ఆంధ్ర వైద్యకళాశాల, వ్యాధి నిర్ధారణ విభాగము(Department of Pathology)

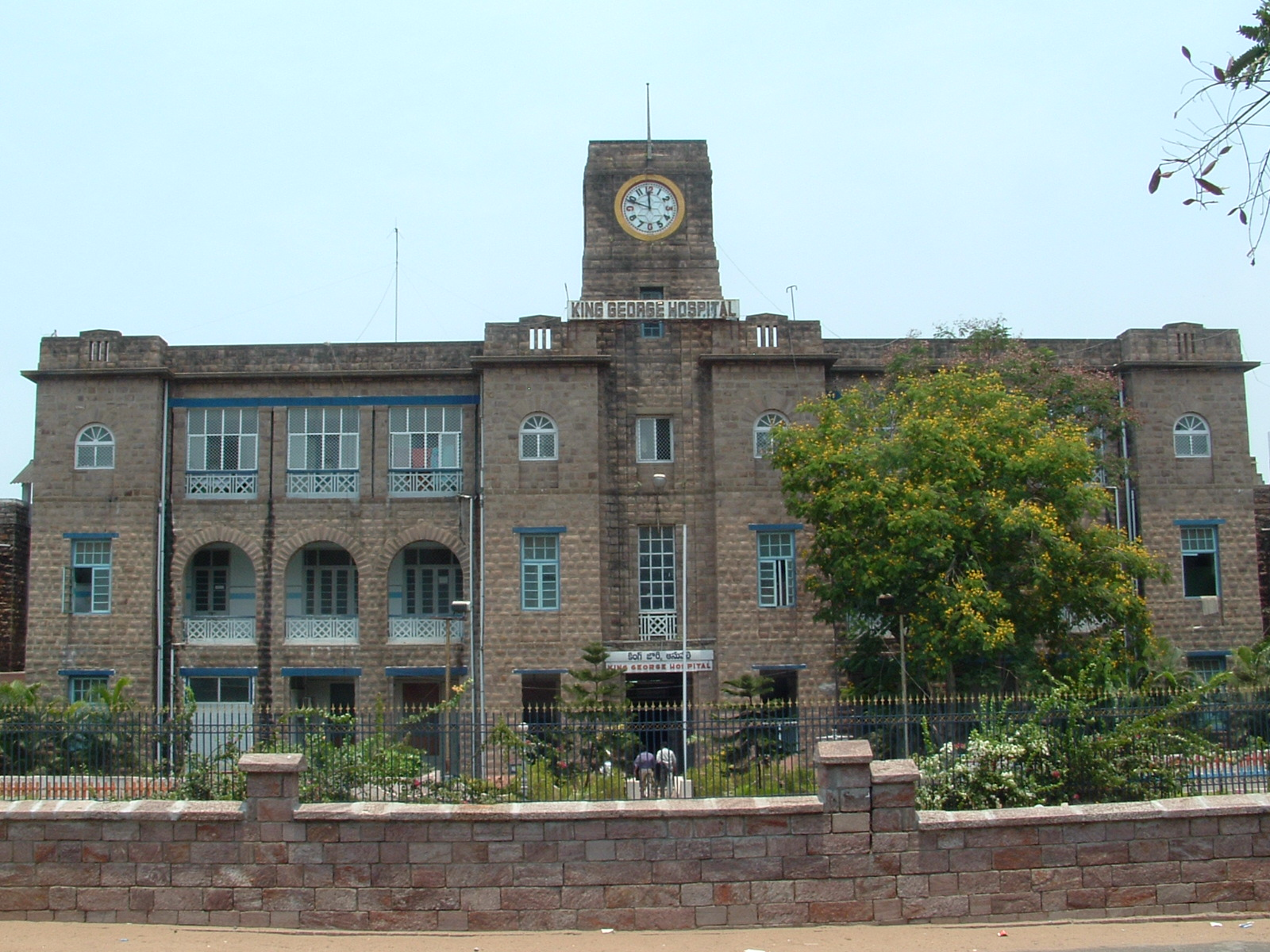
Main building of KCH

కింగ్ జార్జి ఆసుపత్రి గుండె జబ్బులు - గుండె, ఛాతి శస్త్రచికిత్సల విభాగము(Department of Cardiology and Department of Cardio Thoracic Surgery)
