= Government ENT Hospital, Visakhapatnam =

Coordinates: 17.730205°N 83.330747°E

Govt ENT Hospital
- Government of Andhra Pradesh

Geography
- Location: Pedda Waltair, Visakhapatnam, India

Organisation
- Care system: Public
- Type: Speciality
- Affiliated university: N.T.R. Health University

Services
- Emergency department: yes

Government ENT Hospital, which serves ear, nose and throat Diseases across Coastal Andhra, is located in Pedda Waltair, Visakhapatnam.

== Services ==
The hospital launched a cochlear implant surgery programme in 2015.

The hospital serves not only patients from Andhra Pradesh but also those from Odisha and Chhattisgarh. It sees 500 outpatients daily and performs 50 surgeries each week. The hospital currently employs only one audiologist, with four vacancies, a situation that has persisted since 2009.

In September 2018, the medical staff at the hospital went on strike, demanding a revision of salaries.

The hospital was founded under the leadership of Dr. M.V. Appa Rao, the first superintendent.
