= Simplified Airway Risk Index =

Mallampati score. One of seven parameters used to calculate a SARI score

The Simplified Airway Risk Index (SARI), or El-Ganzouri Risk Index (EGRI), is a multivariate risk score thought to estimate the risk of difficult tracheal intubation. The SARI score ranges from 0 to 12 points, where a higher number of points indicates a more difficult airway. A SARI score of 4 or above is thought to indicate a difficult intubation. Seven parameters are used to calculate the SARI score: Mouth opening, thyromental distance, Mallampati score, movement of the neck, the ability to create an underbite, body weight, and previous intubation history.

== Calculation ==
1. Mouth opening: A mouth opening greater than 4 centimeters between the incisors results in 0 points, whereas a distance below results in 1 point.
2. Thyromental distance:A thyromental distance greater than 6.5 centimeters results in 0 points, whereas a distance between 6-6.5 centimeters is given 1 point, and finally a distance below 6 centimeters is given 2 points.
3. Mallampati score: Class I and II of the modified Mallampati scoring results in 0 points, whereas a class III is given 1 point, and a class IV 2 points.
4. Movement of the neck: The ability to move the neck more than 90 degrees results in 0 points, whereas a movement range of 80-90 degrees results in 1 point,t and a movement range below 80 degrees results in 2 points.
5. Underbite: If the patient can protrude the jaw enough to create an underbite, a score of 0 is given if not 1 point.
6. Body weight: A weight below 90 kilograms results in 0 points. A weight between 90 and 110 kilograms is given 1 point, and a weight above 110 kilograms counts as 2 points.
7. Previous intubation history: If the patient has previously been intubated without any difficulties, a score of 0 points is given. If the patient has not previously been intubated, is unsure whether there were any difficulties,s or no records can be produced, a score of 1 point is given. If there is a positive history of difficulties intubating, 2 points are given.

	Parameter	0 points	1 point	2 points
1	Mouth opening	> 4 cm	<4 cm	
2	Thyromental Distance	>6.5 cm	6 to 6.5 cm	<6 cm
3	Mallampati	I or II	III	IV
4	Neck movement	> 90°	80 to 90°	< 80°
5	Underbite	Can protrude jaw	Cannot protrude jaw	
6	Body weight	< 90 kg	90 to 110 kg	> 110 kg
7	Previous intubation history	No difficulty	Unsure or Unknown	Known difficulty
	Score ≥ 4 - Predictor of difficult intubation			

== See also ==
- Cormack-Lehane classification system
