= Ponduri Venkata Ramana Rao =

Indian microbiologist

Ponduri Venkata Ramana Rao (3 April 1917 – 13 April 2005) was an Indian microbiologist. He was born at Rajupalem in Ongole district (now Prakasam district), Madras Presidency, British India.

He graduated with a Bachelor of Science degree from the Government Arts College, Rajamundry in 1937 and graduated with a Bachelor of Medicine, Bachelor of Surgery degree from Andhra Medical College, Visakhapatnam in 1944. He was in Army Medical Service between 1944 and 1947 and worked as Regimental Medical Officer and Field Ambulance Officer (Army) in the Second World War.

He obtained a Diploma in Public Health from the All India Institute of Hygiene and Public Health, Kolkata in 1948 and an M.D. degree in Bacteriology from Andhra Medical College.

He joined the Osmania Medical College, Hyderabad as a lecturer in Bacteriology in 1953 and was promoted to Professor in 1957. During his 14 years of service in medical college he organized the department of Microbiology and developed into a full-fledged postgraduate center with comprehensive research facilities. He travelled on an A.T.C.M. Fellowship in 1958–1959 to Syracuse, New York and Virus Labs in Albany, New York, U.S.A where he worked on Yaws, Endemic typhus and Cholera.

He served as a member of 12 National and International Scientific Associations and was elected as Fellow of American Public Health Association for his work in the field of public health. He was on several ICMR Committees and scientific advisory boards.

He took over as Director of Institute of Preventive Medicine, Hyderabad in 1967 where he worked until 1973. He was instrumental in developing 50 acres (200,000 m^{2}) of land at Nacharam into premier vaccine unit. This ambitious project was inaugurated by President of India V.V. Giri.

He visited various institutes in Yugoslavia, United Kingdom and the U.S.S.R. as W.H.O. fellow to observe the production of lyophilised smallpox vaccine.

After retirement, he taught in various medical colleges in Belgium, Davangere, Deccan and Bidar Dental College. He consulted for the Government of India and the W.H.O. on the National Smallpox Eradication Programme (N.S.E.P) in South Bihar. Smallpox was ultimately eradicated from India in 1975.
