= Peda Waltair =

Peda Waltair/Pedda Waltair
- Neighbourhood
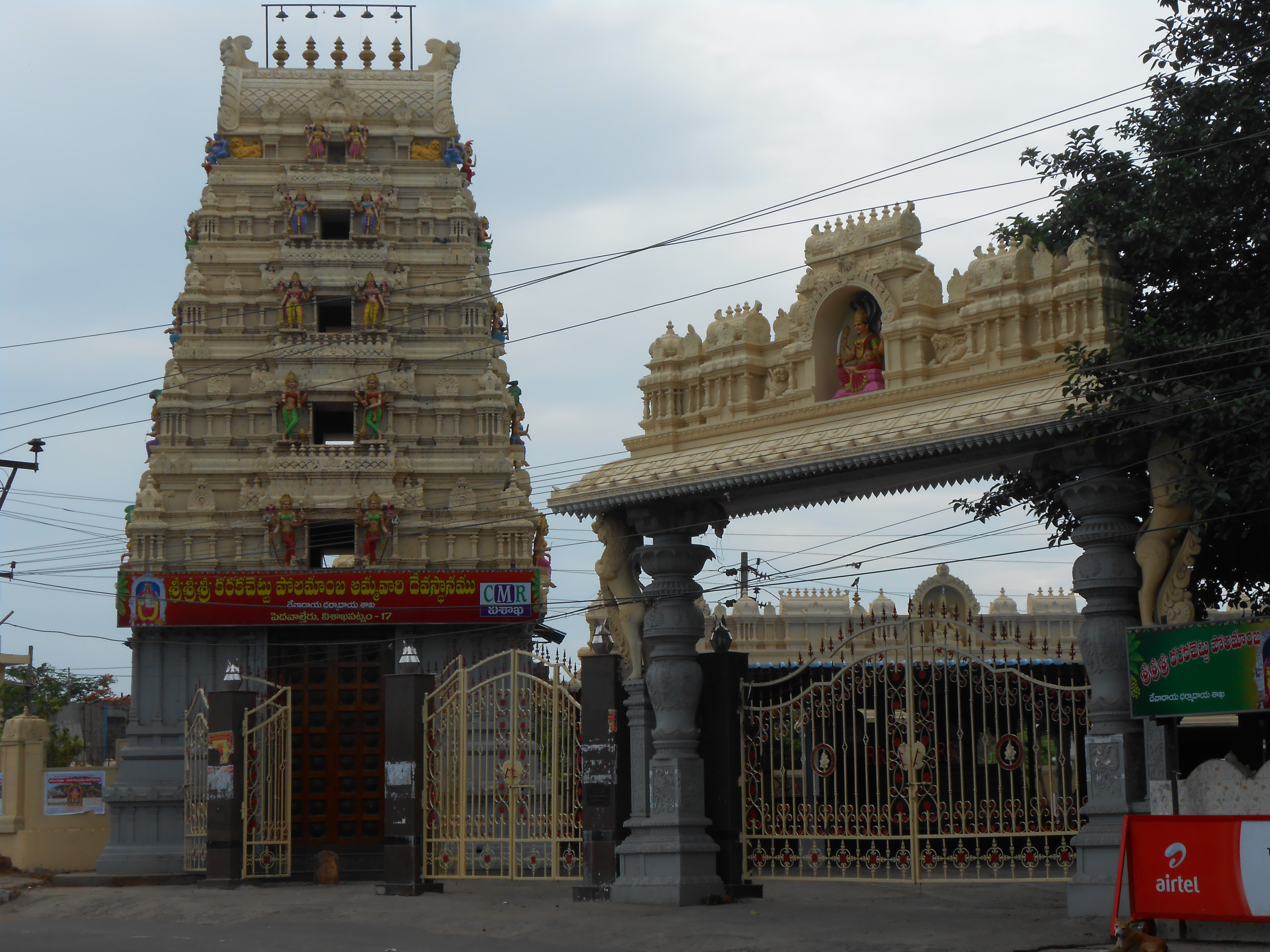
- Karaka Chettu Polamamba Temple at Peda Waltair

- Location in Visakhapatnam
- Coordinates: 17.732943°N 83.332220°E
- Country: India
- State: Andhra Pradesh
- District: Visakhapatnam

Government
  - Body: Greater Visakhapatnam Municipal Corporation

Languages
  - Official: Telugu
- Time zone: UTC+5:30 (IST)
- PIN: 530017
- Vehicle registration: AP 31, AP 32, AP 33, AP 39 & AP 40

Peda Waltair/Pedda Waltair is a residential locality situated at the eastern part of Visakhapatnam, India.

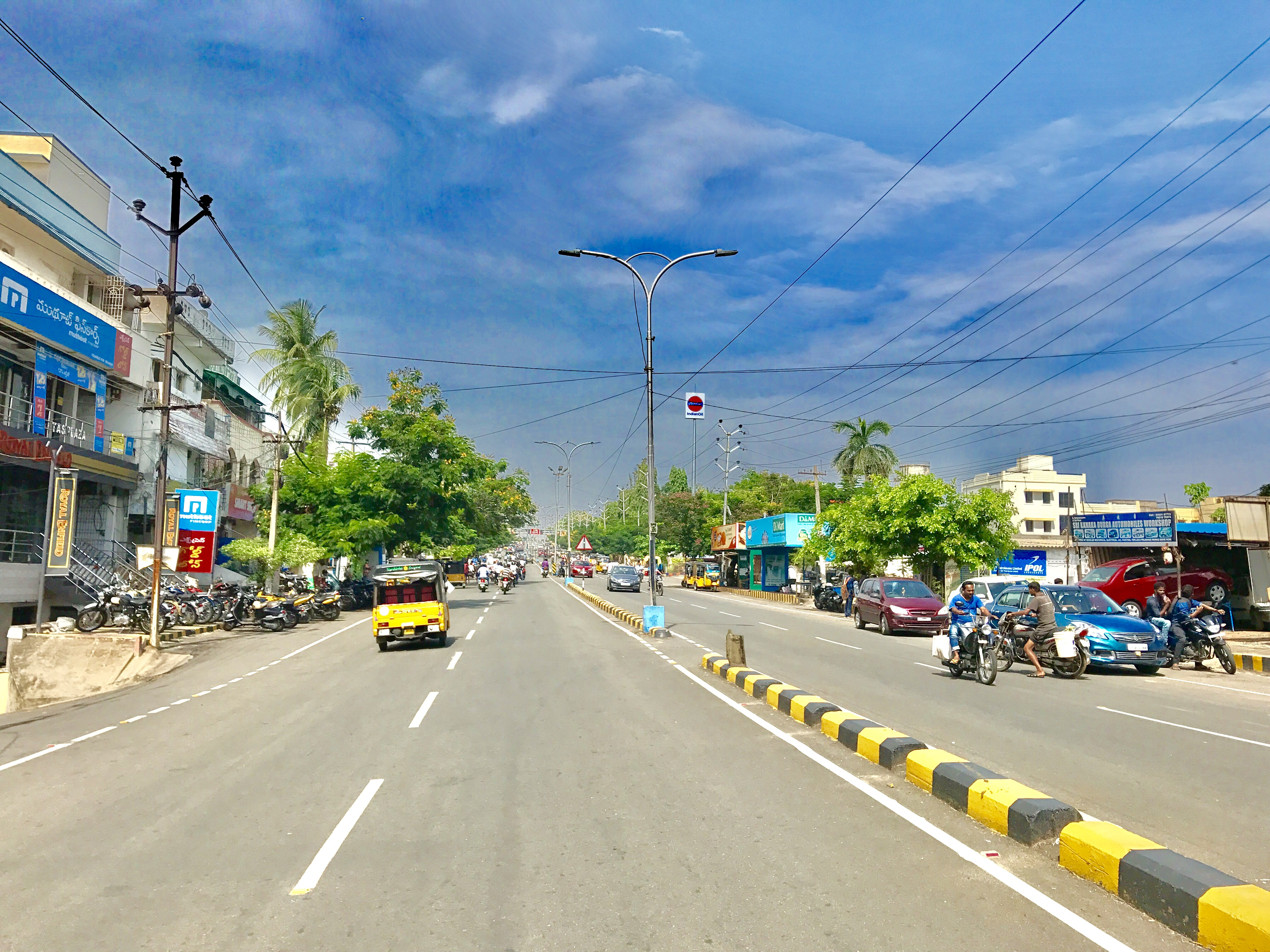
Karakachettu Road at Pedawaltair.

== Etymology ==
The name Waltair/Valteru(వాల్తేరు) is derived from two words: Valu (meaning sloping) and Yeru/Eru (meaning river). It is often incorrectly attributed to the name of a British officer who worked as a collector in Visakhapatnam (former Vizagapatam/Vizagapatum) in the 18th century. However, a look into the records of Vizagapatam since its inception as a District (1802–03) has proven that not even one English officer named 'Walter' had ever been posted here.

== History ==
The village of Valteru has often found its name used synonymously with Vizagapatam even until a few decades ago. The Visakhapatnam railway station was also called as Waltair railway station. The village of Waltair finds itself in the annals of history as an important center which attracted the interest of a lot of Europeans. Adjacent to this village sits the picturesque beaches of Lawsons Bay Colony. The name of this estate originated from the British commander of an Indiaman ship "Lord Hobart" who owned this cove up until his demise in late 1820. The villages 'Pedda Waltair' and 'Chinna Waltair' were probably just called Valteru before the Dutch and English came here and made it their home. It is believed that the part of the village on one side of the river is named as 'Pedda Waltair' due to its bigger area, while the other side was named 'Chinna Waltair'. Mentions of Waltair were also available in the Vizagapatam district Gazzeteer of 1907.

== Culture ==
The most famous place of worship here is Sri Karakachettu Polamamba Temple. This deity (grama devata, గ్రామదేవత/village deity) is considered as the protector of 14 villages (including Valteru/Waltair) around Waltair. Every year, the first Sunday after the Telugu new year (Ugadi) a proclamation (చాటింపు) is made in these 14 villages that 9 days following that Sunday i.e., Tuesday (usually in March/April) all these villages will celebrate in honour of the beloved goddess. This celebration is said have been happening from the 15th century. The presiding deity in the temple is said to be found by the fishermen from the neighbouring village 'Jalaripeta', who then handed over the deity to the local Reddys/Reddis as per the wish of the goddess who appeared in the dreams of those fishermen. Since then, the goddess was placed under a sacred sage-leaved Gall Nut tree (Karakachettu) and celebrated every year thanking her for the prosperity and safety provided by her.

== Transport ==
APSRTC routes

Route number	Start	End	Via
900 (Discontinued)	Maddilapalem	Railway Station	Railway Station, RTC Complex, Waltair, MVP Colony, Maddilapalem
900K	RTC Complex	Bhimili	Railway Station, RTC Complex, Waltair, MVP Colony, Kailasagiri, Rushikonda, GITAM, Mangamaripeta, Ins Kalinga, Bhimili

== See also ==
- Government TB and Chest Hospital, Visakhapatnam
