= Visakha Museum =

Museum in Visakhapatnam, Andhra Pradesh, India

Coordinates: 17.720707°N 83.333831°E

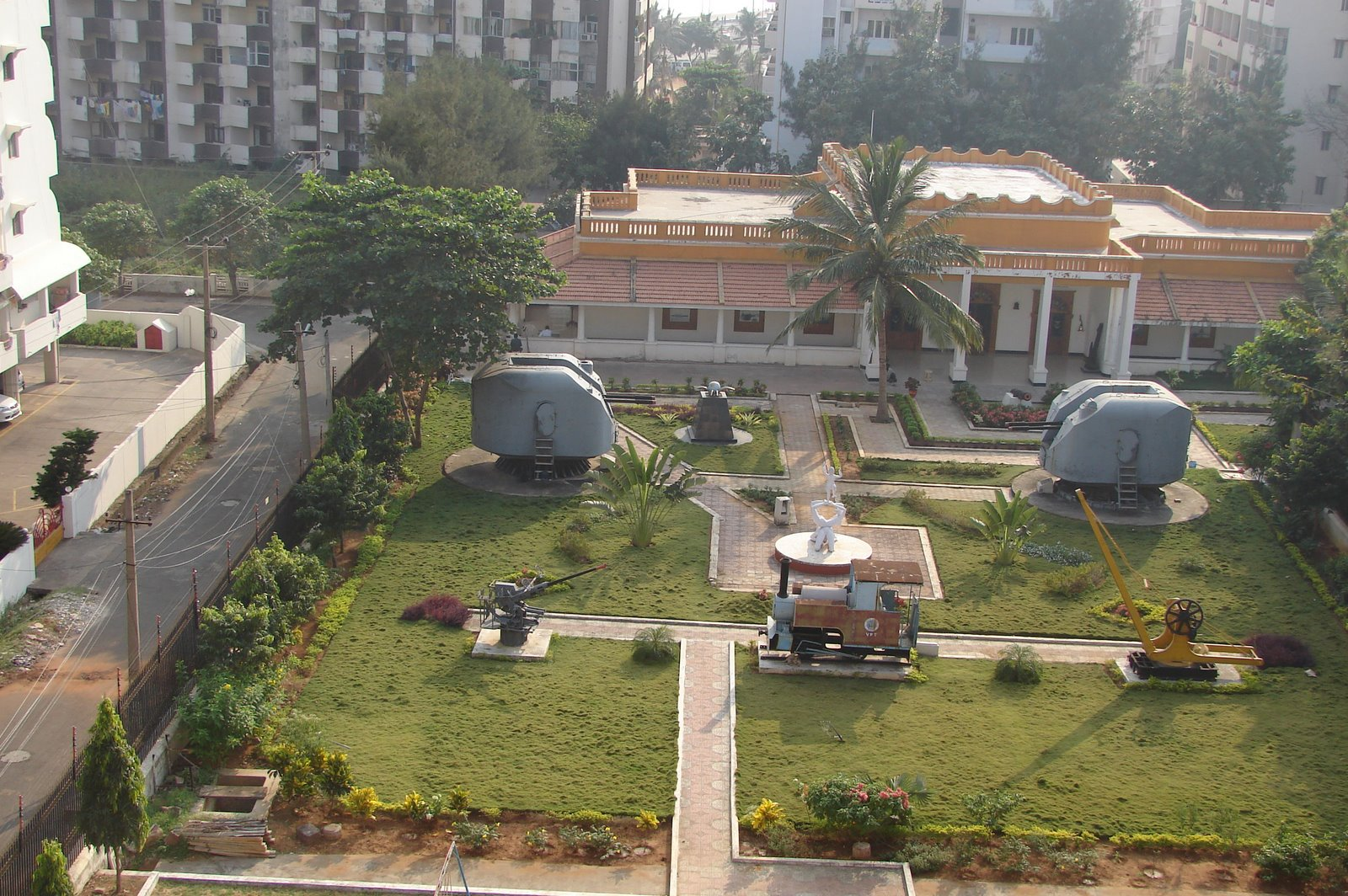
- Established: 8 October 1991
- Location: Rk Beach Road, Visakhapatnam, Andhra Pradesh, India
- Owner: Government of India

Visakha Museum (known fully as Visakhapatnam Municipal Corporation Museum) is a museum located in the port city of Visakhapatnam in Andhra Pradesh, India, which houses the historical treasures and artifacts of the Kalingandhra region. It was inaugurated by the then Chief Minister of Andhra Pradesh N. Janardhana Reddy on 8 October 1991, owned by Government of India.

== Overview ==
=== There are two sections in operation at Visakha Museum. ===
1. Maritime Museum
2. Heritage Museum.

== Maritime Museum ==
The Eastern Naval Command has handed over the Naval Artefacts to GVMC to set up a Maritime Museum in the Dutch Bungalow located in the Visakha Museum premises, Beach Road. Earlier, the original heritage artefacts belonging to this region were housed in Dutch bungalows. As it was converted into a maritime museum, the GVMC constructed two-story blocks on the rear side of the Visakha Museum premises to relocate the heritage artefacts.

After the Dutch Bungalow was acquired, then Commissioner Sri Sameer Sarma I.A.S. and the then Mayor Sri D V Subba Rao made all available efforts in acquiring antique and historic artefacts from the royal families of the region, such as Vijayanagaram Samsthanam, Kirlampudi Estate (Bobbili), Ankitham House, Jaipore family (Odisha), local institutions such as VPT, HSL, AU, Navy, and other local distinctive personalities. The museum was inaugurated by Chief Minister of Andhra Pradesh, Sri N. Janardhan Reddy, on 8 October 1991.

During the year 2003–2004, renovation of the Dutch Building was undertaken at a cost of Rs 30.00 lakhs. While the building was under renovation, the Navy requested that the MCV allow them to establish the Maritime Museum in the Dutch Building, thus the Maritime Museum was established and inaugurated on 4 December 2004. An MoU was entered between MCV and the Navy. While the Dutch Building was allotted for the Maritime Museum, MCV has constructed two floors with a plinth of about 20.000sq ft over the existing State Archeology Department block to accommodate the Corporation Museum at a cost of Rs. 35.00 lakhs. The HW Mayor inaugurated the new block on 14 March 2005. The museum's total extension area is 5.00 acres.

== Artefacts exist in the Maritime Museum. ==
Artefacts in the Maritime Museum are displayed in 10 rooms.

- Room No.I - Consists of various weapons used by the Navy.
- Room No.2 - Consists of information with regard to nautical aspects of the Navy.
- Room No. 3 - Consists of naval aviation and related aspects.
- Room No. 4 - Entrance foyer consists of a statue of Lord Varuna. flag insignia of the Navy, Coast Guard, and Merchant Navy, etc.
- Rooms 5 & 6 - Consist of maritime history and the Naval Maritime History of India.
- Room No. 7 - Consists of information on the Surface Navy.
- Room No. 8 - Consists of Navy-in-action ice models of various Naval Activities.
- Room No. 9 - Consists of history and information about submarines.
- Room No.10 - Consists of information and artefacts from wars fought by the Navy.

== Heritage Museum ==
The Heritage Museum is located in a two-story building on the rear side of the Visakha Museum and consists of artefacts and heirlooms from North - Coastal Andhra.

Ground Floor(Archaeological museum)

Archeology Museum, maintained by the Assistant Director, Archeology Department.

Brief history about district archaeological museum, visakhapatnam.

The District Archaeological Museum Visakhapatnam is located on the premises of the Visakha Museum on Beach Road in Visakhapatnam. The objects displayed in the archaeological section of Visakha Museum represent the cultural aspects of the region, including Visakhapatnam and its surroundings.

The Archaeological Section new building added to the existing Visakha Museum consists of five galleries, viz.,

=== 5. Celadon and Enamel Ware Gallery. ===
The sculptural gallery consists of stone sculptures ranging in date from the 1st century A.D. to the 16th century A.D. These include Buddhist, Jain, Saivite, Vaishnavite and Saktite images. Among the Buddhist sculptures kept on display are the Buddha Padas and Chatra pieces from Bavikonda and Thotlakonda (Visakhapatnam district), pillars and sculptural friezes of railing from Panigiri and Tirumala Giri (Nalgonda district.), Buddha images from Takkellapadu (Guntur District), and Nelakondapalli (Khammam District). Besides, a few Buddhist sculptures, including Buddha images received from central India on the exchange of art objects scheme, are also displayed here for the purpose of comparative study in art styles. The Buddha images in different postures, such as Buddha with Bhumisparsha Mudra, Buddha with Abhaya and Varada Mudras, Buddha with Dharmachakrapravarthana Mudra, and Buddha in Mahaparinurvana, which are on display.

Only two Jaina images viz.,Vardhamana Mahavira and Paraswanatha, are displayed in the sculptural gallery.

The Saivite sculptures on display include Ganesha, Subrahmanya, Heads of Shiva, Shivalinga and Bhairava. Among the Vaishnavite idols, Kaliyana Krishna, Rama, Lakshmana, Sita, and Venugopala, flanked by Rukmini, Satyabhama, and Surya, are noteworthy. The Saivato sculptures are represented by Saptamatrikas, Parvathi, and Saraswathi.

The second gallery consists of bronze objects, copper plates, coins, and other antiquities. The bronzes datable to the period between the 12th and 18th centuries A.D, were recovered from Simhachalam, Bhogapuram, and Siripuram belonging to Visakhapatnam and Vizianagaram districts by way of treasure troves. They include Bhairava, Lakhmi, and devotees (Simhachalam), Vishnu, Sridevi and Bhudevi (Bhogapuram) and Vishnu and Bhudevi (Vizianagaram), Vishnu, Sridevi, and a head of Tara (a Buddhist goddess). inscriptions displayed in the museum.

There are both stone and copper plate inscriptions displayed; the earliest stone inscription is datable to the 1st century B.C. in Brahmi characters from Kesanapalli, a Buddhist site in Guntur District. This inscription reads Bandhukasa damura, meaning the slab was donated by one Bandhuka.

Another interesting stone inscription in Tamil characters dated to 1083 A.D. refers to the change of the name of Visakhapatnam to Kulothunga Chola Pattanam by the military general of Kulothunga. The Chalukya-Chola king who ruled this area in 11th century A.D. The other stone inscription was issued by the Chalukyas of Yalamanchili and local Zamindars called Gajapathis.

There are two copper plates belonging to the Eastern Ganga. The first set called Devakavadakuru plates, of Raja Raja Devendra Varma, dated 1076 A.D. registered the gift of a few villages to their subordinates, i.e., Ayya Chiefs.

Another set known as Munjeru Copper plates dated to the 9th century A.D. were issued during the regal year of Anantavaram Chadaganga, which registered a gift of a village Munjeru situated in Devada Vishaya of Kalingadesa to Brahmin of Chirkundi.

=== First Floor ===
- The Art Gallery, donated by Sri Abburi Kalakshetram, consists of paintings by various famous artists. Art models of foreign countries. Japanese dolls. Famous paintings of Adavi Bapiraju and the old palanquin.
- The showcases on the western side consist of old musical instruments, old cameras, gramophones, etc.
- On the eastern side, there are animal hunting trophies donated by noble families of this region and replicas of ancient coins. currency notes of various foreign countries, life-like statues of fishermen folk, old wall clocks, etc.

=== Second Floor ===
- On the western side, we have life-size oil paintings of the Maharajas of Vijayanagaram, Bobbili. Jaipur, Armoury, Guns and pistols, various kinds of war swords, life-like statues of children playing traditional games.
- On the eastern side, we have old photographs of Visakhapatnam, old cutlery, life-like statues of children playing traditional games, etc.

== Present entrance ticket rates ==
=== Holiday Functioning ===
The museum is open from 11:00 am. to 7:00 p.m. every day except Saturday and Sunday.

Saturday and Sunday are open from 12:00 pm. to 8:00 p.m.

=== Note: Every Friday holiday ===
Article by Panda Sailokeswara Rao

== See also ==
- Coastal Andhra
- Visakhapatnam
