= Sonti Dakshinamurthy =

Indian physician

Sonti Dakshinamurthy M.B., B.S., B.S.Sc., D.P.H., D.T.M.H., Ph.D. (22 December 1899 - 1975) was a professor of Social and Preventive Medicine in India, medical writer and an expert on Malaria.

He was born at Anakapalle in Visakhapatnam district, Andhra Pradesh. After studying M.B., B.S. at Chennai, he went to London for higher studies. He did D.T.H and D.T.M.H. and did his Ph.D.

After returning to India, he joined Andhra Medical College, Visakhapatnam as Lecturer between 1932 and 1938. He joined and worked in different positions between 1941 and 1951. He was appointed as Director of Health between 1953 and 1955 under Government of Andhra Pradesh.

He was the adviser to World Health Organization for about 25 years on Malaria. He held the position of deputy director of Singapore office for 2 years. He visited Iraq, Alexandria and other countries as a Malaria team.

He wrote a textbook for medical students in India titled "Introduction to Preventive and Social Medicine" in 1962. It was published by Educational Enterprises, Kakinada. The foreword is written by A. L. Mudaliar.

In memory of his services, Andhra Medical College instituted a medal to be given to the meritorious students every year named "Dr. Sonti Dakshina Murthy Prize".
