= Kudla (surname) =

Kudla or Kudła is a surname. Notable people with the surname include:

- Bettina Kudla (born 1962), German politician
- Dawid Kudła (born 1992), Polish footballer
- Denis Kudla (born 1992), American tennis player
- Denis Kudla (wrestler) (born 1994), Polish-born German wrestler
- Loku Kudla (born 1988), Indian poet and lyricist
- Mateusz Kudła (born 1991), Polish film producer
- Michał Kudła (born 1991), Polish canoeist
- Patrick Kudla (born 1996), Canadian ice hockey player
- Stephen S. Kudla (born 1950), American mathematician
