= Rama Talkies Road =

Major Indian Road

Coordinates: 17.728264°N 83.312029°E

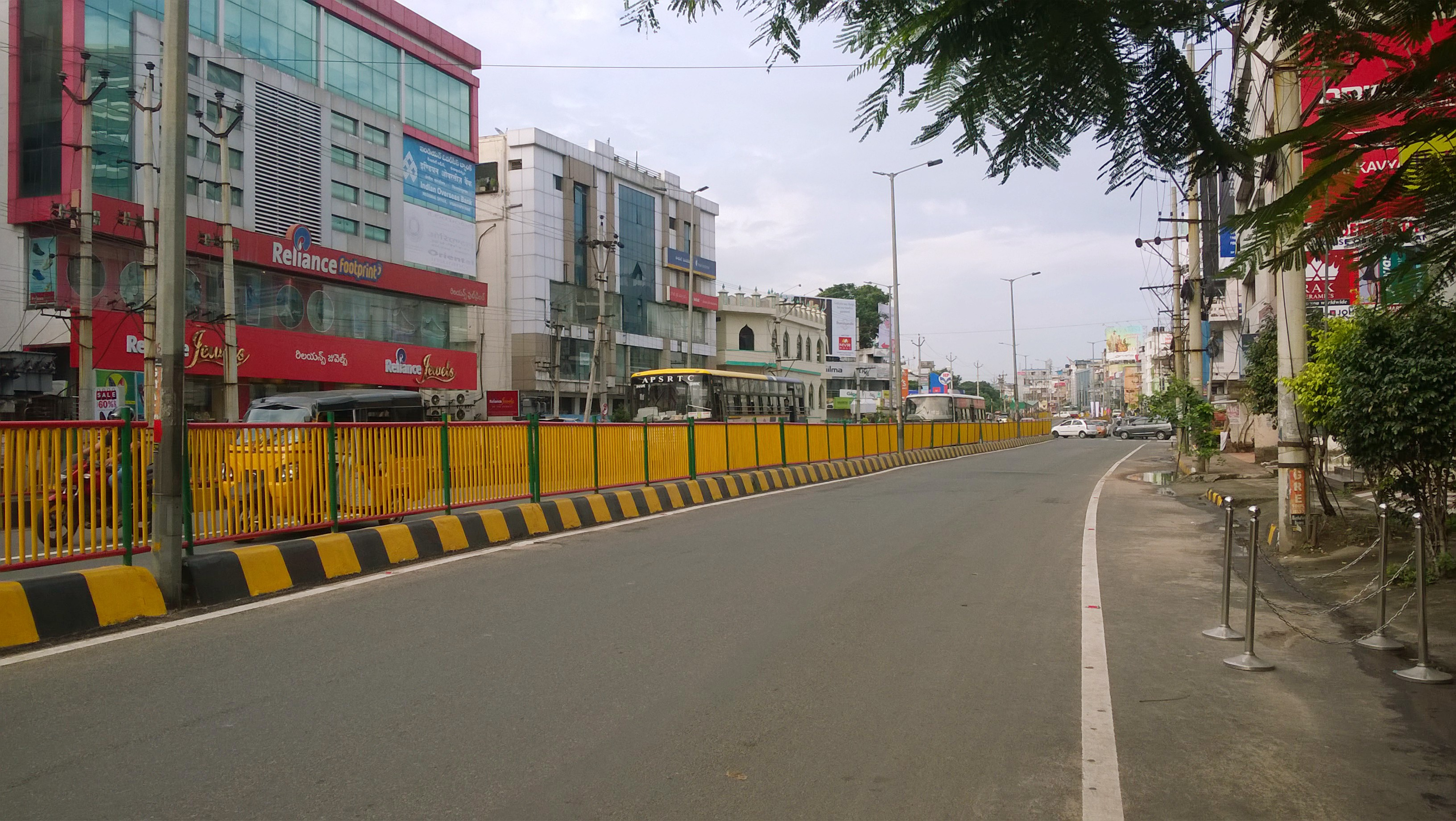
Visakhapatnam Bus Rapid Transit System at Rama Talkies Road.

Rama Talkies Road is a major road in the Indian city of Visakhapatnam. The road is named after a nearby movie theater and is one of the busiest routes connecting to Dwaraka Bus Station.
