= Indian Academy of Forensic Medicine =

- Formation: 12 May 1972
- Headquarters: Goa, India
- Leader: Dr. I. Bhooshana Rao (First president)
- Website: iafmonline.in

The Indian Academy of Forensic Medicine (IAFM) was founded and registered as Society on 12 May 1972. Dr. I. Bhooshana Rao was the first President of the academy.

The Indian Academy of Forensic Medicine is the largest association of the specialty of Forensic Pathology in India. It also publishes its quarterly Journal of Indian Academy of Forensic Medicine regularly. This association has specialist member strength of more than 1200.

== Publications ==
The Academy also publishes a quarterly-monthly research journal called Journal of Indian Academy of Forensic Medicine, an indexed journal since 1972. The scope of the journal covers all aspects of Forensic Medicine and allied fields, research and applied.
