= Government TB and Chest Hospital, Visakhapatnam =

Coordinates: 17.727259°N 83.333109°E

Government TB and Chest Hospital
- Government of Andhra Pradesh

Geography
- Location: Pedda Waltair, Visakhapatnam, India

Organisation
- Care system: Public
- Type: Tuberculosis, Contagious disease
- Affiliated university: N.T.R. Health University

Services
- Emergency department: yes
- Beds: 288

History
- Founded: 1961

Government TB and Chest Hospital is all so called as Government Hospital for Chest and Communicable Diseases is located at Pedda Waltair, Visakhapatnam. It is one of the important government hospitals in the City.

== Services ==
The Government Hospital for Chest and Communicable Diseases provides services for swine influenza, pneumonia, interstitial lung disease and TB cases. The hospital employs a significant proportion of the 460 government doctors in the city. This hospital is the only test multi-drug-resistant tuberculosis (MDR-TB) samples in the state of Andhra Pradesh before establishing the testing center of Anantapur, and this hospital is listed in Government of India National Health Mission.
