= M. G. Kini =

Indian Orthopedic Surgeon

Mangalore Gopal Kini (1893–1952), better known as M. G. Kini M.C., M.B., M.Ch., F.R.C.S., was an Indian Orthopedic Surgeon.

He was considered by the Indian Orthopedic surgical community as the forerunner of Orthopedic Surgery in India. The "Kini Memorial Oration" has been held by the Indian Orthopaedic Association (IOA) every year since 1958.

== Publications ==
- Kini, M. G. (1940). "Dislocation of the Elbow and its complications: A Simple Technique for Excision of the Elbow". Journal of Bone and Joint Surgery. 22 (1): 107–117.
- Kini, M. G. (1942). "Fracture of the lateral condyle of the lower end of the Humerus with complicationa: A Simple Technique for Closed Reduction of Capitellar Fracture". Journal of Bone and Joint Surgery. 24 (2): 270–280.
- Kini, M. G.; Rao, K. V. S. (1937). "Problem of cancer". Indian Medical Gazette. 71: 677–679.
- Kini, M. G. (1944). "Cancer of the penis in a child aged two years". Indian Medical Gazette. 79 (2): 66–68. PMC 5155798. PMID 29012033.
- Kini, M. G. (1938). "Multiple pancreatic calculi with chronic pancreatitis". British Journal of Surgery. 25 (99): 705–706. doi:10.1002/bjs.1800259926.
- Kini, M. G. (1944). "Epitheliomas of the palate caused by smoking of cigars with the lighted end inside the mouth". Indian Medical Gazette. 79 (12): 572–574. PMC 5218789. PMID 29014126.
- Kini, MG (1952). "A survey of fracture setting through ages down to present times to show the need of an organizational set to improve the existing conditions in India". Calcutta Medical Journal. 49 (1): 1–8, contd. PMID 14905275.
- Rao, VR; Kini, MG (1951). "Infections of the foot; an anatomical and experimental study of fascial spaces and tendon sheaths with clinical correlation of certain types of infections of the foot". Indian Journal of Medical Research. 37: 1–115. PMID 13117535.
- Kini, M. G. (1939). "A case of congenital ranula of the left submaxillary gland". British Journal of Surgery. 26 (104): 947–949. doi:10.1002/bjs.18002610422.
- Kini, M. G. (1942). "Primary tuberculosis appendicitis". Indian Journal of Surgery. 4: 34–47.
- Kini, M. G. (September 1940). "Benign Cyst of the Parotid Gland". British Medical Journal. 2 (4160): 415, 422–4. doi:10.1136/bmj.2.4160.415. PMC 2179491. PMID 20783314.
