= Mallampati score =

Scoring metric for airway anatomic features

Modified Mallampati score.

The Mallampati score, or Mallampati classification, named after the Indian anaesthesiologist Seshagiri Mallampati, is used to predict the ease of endotracheal intubation. S.R. Mallampati originally described this classification in 1985 in a prospective study of 210 patients undergoing elective surgery. The original Mallampati scoring consisted of three classes. Later in 1987, Samsoon and Young introduced a fourth class, in which visualization is restricted to the hard palate.

The test comprises a visual assessment of the distance from the tongue base to the roof of the mouth, and therefore the amount of space in which there is to work. It is an indirect way of assessing how difficult an intubation will be; this is more definitively scored using the Cormack–Lehane classification system, which describes what is actually seen using direct laryngoscopy during the intubation process itself. A high Mallampati score (class 3 or 4) is associated with more difficult intubation, as well as a higher incidence of obstructive sleep apnea.

== Technique ==
The score is assessed by asking the patient, in an upright sitting position, to open their mouth and to protrude the tongue as much as possible. The anatomy of the oral cavity is visualized; specifically, the assessor notes whether the base of the uvula, faucial pillars (the arches in front of and behind the tonsils) and soft palate are visible. Scoring is generally done without phonation. Depending on whether the tongue is maximally protruded and/or the patient asked to phonate, the scoring may vary. Inter-observer variability may also affect the reproducibility of Mallampati scoring between healthcare professionals.

Modified Mallampati Scoring:

- Class I: Soft palate, uvula, fauces, pillars visible.
- Class II: Soft palate, major part of uvula, fauces visible.
- Class III: Soft palate, base of uvula visible.
- Class IV: Only hard palate visible.

Original Mallampati Scoring:

- Class 1: Faucial pillars, soft palate and uvula could be visualized.
- Class 2: Faucial pillars and soft palate could be visualized, but uvula was masked by the base of the tongue.
- Class 3: Only soft palate visualized.

Posture

The assessment can be performed with the patient in both a sitting or supine position. With tongue maximally protruded, assessment in the either position has not been found to significantly change the provider's view and has been shown to change the predictive value of the Mallampati Scoring. It is, however, important to standardize the approach for airway trainees to limit any possible variation.

Phonation

Phonation during the assessment includes the patient making an "Ah" sound with mouth open and tongue maximally protruded in either sitting or supine position. This action leads elevation of the soft palate, therefore, improving the Mallampati classification grade. Phonation has been shown to improve Mallampati classes III and IV to I and II in majority of assessments. Studies found that these improvements identified falsely classified difficult airways in most cases but have also falsely masked difficult airways in minority of cases. Given the morbidity and mortality associated with difficult airways, it is important to standardize the approach for airway trainees, and larger studies are needed to conclude whether phonation improves the predictive value of Mallampati scoring.

Further research may be needed to determine the most effective and consistent approach on which to standardize Mallampati Scoring.

== Clinical significance ==
While Mallampati classes I and II are associated with relatively easy intubation, classes III and IV are associated with increased difficulty.

A systematic review of 42 studies, with 34,513 participants, found that the modified Mallampati score is a good predictor of difficult direct laryngoscopy and intubation, but poor at predicting difficult bag mask ventilation. Therefore, the study concluded that while useful in combination with other tests to predict the difficulty of an airway, it is not sufficiently accurate alone.

In a systematic review of 133 studies with 844,206 participants, the use of multiple screening tests, including Thyromental distance, Wilson score, Mallampati score, neck mobility, Upper Lip Bite Test, is recommended in clinical practice to predict a difficult airway in patient with seemingly normal anatomy, although their predictive value alone was limited and variable.

Transesophageal Echocardiogram (TEE)

Beyond endotracheal intubation, Mallampati scoring is part of the pre-procedure assessment for patient undergoing TEE. This procedure may be performed with topical analgesia of the oropharynx or in addition to sedation/monitored anesthesia care (MAC) based on the patient's tolerance, proceduralist preference, and probability of complications such as gagging. In a study of 85 unsedated patients, Mallampati scoring of III and IV was associated with a higher incidence of gagging during the procedure and longer insertion times when compared to Mallampati scores of I and II. Higher Mallampati scores were also associated to increases in heart rate, mean arterial blood pressure, and decreases in oxygen saturation during the procedure, although these results were not statistically significant. The study found that all participants were able to successfully undergo the procedure, however, the increased incidence of complications associated with higher Mallampati scoring can be taken under consideration when determining if the patient should receive oral analgesia alone or in addition to sedation.

Pregnancy & Labor

Airway assessment is also an important component in the anesthetic care of obstetric patients. Fluid retention during pregnancy leads to an increase in airway edema, which has been found to lead to an increase in Mallampati scoring. In a study of 242 pregnant patients, there was a 34% increase in the incidence of Mallampati class IV scores at 38 weeks gestation when compared to first trimester. These increases in Mallampati scoring have been found to lead to increased difficulty with laryngoscopy in obstetric patients versus general surgery, and increased difficulty in placement of a laryngeal mask airway (LMA).

However, effective mask ventilation of obstetric patients undergoing cesarean section was not observed to be different between obstetric and non-obstetric patients with similar Mallampati scoring. While pregnancy is associated with a higher incidence of failed first attempt intubation and LMA placement, more studies are necessary to determine the utility of Mallampati scoring alone in predicting difficult airways in this patient population. Similar to non-obstetric patients, the use of multiple screening tests alongside Mallampati scoring is recommended as part of the airway assessment.

== See also ==
- Cormack-Lehane classification system
- Simplified Airway Risk Index
- Thyromental distance
