= Transactions of the Royal Society of Tropical Medicine and Hygiene =

- Discipline: Tropical medicine
- Language: English

Publication details
- History: 1908-present
- Publisher: Oxford University Press
- Frequency: Monthly
- Open access: Hybrid
- Impact factor: 2.820 (2018)

Standard abbreviations
- ISO 4: Trans. R. Soc. Trop. Med. Hyg.

Indexing
- CODEN: TRSTAZ
- ISSN: 0035-9203 (print); 1878-3503 (web)
- LCCN: 25003514
- OCLC no.: 605922899

Links
- Journal homepage; Online access; Online archive

Transactions of the Royal Society of Tropical Medicine and Hygiene is a monthly peer-reviewed medical journal covering all aspects of tropical medicine. It is the official journal of the Royal Society of Tropical Medicine and Hygiene and is published by Oxford University Press. According to the Journal Citation Reports, the journal has a 2018 impact factor of 2.820.

The journal published the first report on Zika virus in 1952.
