= Thyromental distance =

Thyromental distance (TMD) measurement is a method commonly used to predict the difficulty of intubation and is measured from the thyroid notch to the tip of the jaw with the head extended. If it is less than 7.0 cm with hard scarred tissues, it indicates possible difficult intubation.

== See also ==
- Mallampati score
- Simplified Airway Risk Index
