= Bhavanam Venkatarami Reddy =

Indian politician

8th Chief Minister of Andhra Pradesh
- In office 24 February 1982 – 20 September 1982
- Governor: K. C. Abraham
- Deputy Chief Minister: C. Jagannatha Rao (1982)
- Preceded by: Tanguturi Anjaiah
- Succeeded by: Kotla Vijaya Bhaskara Reddy

Personal details
- Born: 18 July 1931 Muppalla, Guntur district, Madras Presidency, British India (now in Andhra Pradesh, India)
- Died: 7 April 2002 (aged 70)
- Party: Indian National Congress
- Spouse: Bhavanam Jayaprada
- Children: 4

Bhavanam Venkatrami Reddy (18 July 1931 – 7 April 2002) was the chief minister of the Indian state of Andhra Pradesh from February–September 1982. He was a member of the Congress party and served as cabinet minister in various AP governments.

== Early life ==
Reddy was born in Muppalla, Guntur district, Madras Presidency, British India. He married Jayaparadha and has one son and three daughters. One of his daughters, Rajyasree, is married to cardiac surgeon and the founder of KIMS Hospitals, Dr. Bhaskar Rao Bollineni. His other daughter, Bhavani, is married to orthopedic surgeon and the founder of Sunshine Hospitals, Dr. A. V. Guruva Reddy.

== Career ==
His political career started in the 1970s as a Youth Congress activist. From there he reached the position of Member of Legislative Assembly and later became education minister in Chenna Reddy's cabinet in 1978. He served in the cabinet of Tanguturi Anjaiah before becoming chief minister on 24 February 1982. He served as the chief minister until 19 September 1982, representing Congress.

== Personal life ==
He died on 7 April 2002 after brief illness, suffering respiratory issues. His wife to Bhavanam Jayaparadha is also a noted politician who served as State Minister. He was known to be a great leader who tirelessly worked for the welfare of people.
