= Attili mandal =

- Mandal
- Interactive map of Attili mandal
- Location in Andhra Pradesh, India
- Coordinates: 16.687°N 81.609°E
- Country: India
- State: Andhra Pradesh
- District: West Godavari
- Headquarters: Attili

Government
  - Body: Mandal Parishad

Area
  - Total: 85.86 km^{2} (33.15 sq mi)

Population (2011)
  - Total: 68,881
  - Density: 802.2/km^{2} (2,078/sq mi)

Languages
  - Official: Telugu
- Time zone: UTC+5:30 (IST)
- Vehicle registration: AP 37

Attili mandal is one of the 46 mandals in West Godavari district of the Indian state of Andhra Pradesh. The headquarters are located in the town Attili. The mandal is bordered by Iragavaram mandal and Penumantra mandal to the north, Palacoderu mandal to the east, Ganapavaram mandal and Tanuku mandal to the west.

== Demographics ==
According to the 2011 census, this mandal had a population of 68,881 in 19,739 households. With 34,590 males and 34,291 females, the sex ratio is 1,009 females per 1000 males. There were 6,232 children in the age group of 0–6 years, of which 3,173 were boys and 3,059 were girls, for a sex ratio of 964. The average literacy rate stands at 77.41% with 48,495 literates, of which 25,485 are males and 23,010 are females. There were 11,190 members of Scheduled Castes and 707 members of Scheduled Tribes.

=== Labor ===
According to the report published by Census India in 2011, 30,048 people were engaged in work activities, of which 21,366 were males and 8,682 were females. In the census, 23,975 workers described their work as main work, 2,475 as cultivators, 15,071 as agricultural laborers, 704 in household industry and 5,725 were involved in other works. Of these, 6,073 were marginal workers.

== Administration ==
Attili mandal is administered under the Tanuku (Assembly constituency) of the Narasapuram Lok Sabha constituency, and is one of the sixteen mandals in the kovvur revenue division.

== Towns and villages ==
According to the 2011 census, the mandal has 14 settlements, all of which are villages. Attili is the largest and Gummampadu is the smallest in terms of population.

The settlements in the mandal are:

1. Aravalli
2. Attili
3. Ballipadu
4. Eduru
5. Gummampadu
6. Kanchumarru
7. Kommara
8. Manchili
9. Pali
10. Paluru
11. Skinnerapuram
12. Tirupatipuram
13. Unikili
14. Varighedu

== Education ==
The mandal plays a major role in education for the rural students of nearby villages. The primary and secondary school education is imparted by government, aided by private schools, under the School Education Department of the state. As per the school information report for the academic year 2015–16, the mandal has more than 7,049 students enrolled in over 76 schools.

== See also ==
- List of mandals in Andhra Pradesh
- Eluru
