= Koti, Hyderabad =

Koti
- Inner City
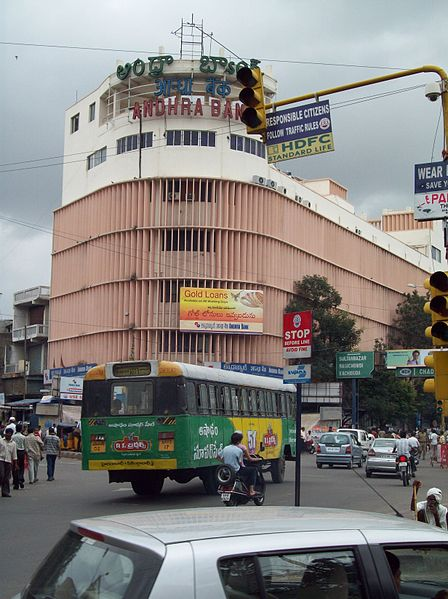
- Street in front of Andhra Bank at Koti

- Location in Hyderabad, India Koti (India)
- Coordinates: 17°23′08″N 78°29′01″E
- Country: India
- State: Telangana
- District: Hyderabad District
- Metro: Hyderabad Metropolitan Region

Government
  - Body: GHMC

Languages
  - Official: Telugu
- Time zone: UTC+5:30 (IST)
- PIN: 500 095
- Vehicle registration: TG
- Lok Sabha constituency: Hyderabad
- Vidhan Sabha constituency: Maharajgunj
- Planning agency: GHMC
- Website: telangana.gov.in

Koti (or Kothi) is a locality in the city of Hyderabad, Telangana, India. It is one of the best-known commercial old suburbs of Hyderabad. There are two areas in the vicinity: King Koti and Ram Koti.

== History ==
The area's name comes from Koti Residency, koti meaning a mansion, for the lavish mansion built in Victorian and Corinthian style once belonging the British resident James Achilles Kirkpatrick and which was, in 1949, converted into the campus of the Osmania University College for Women.

== Background ==
Originally the Devdi was owned by a nobleman Kamal Khan, and later by Mir Osman Ali Khan, the Nizam of Hyderabad and Berar. The Nizam then inhabited the palace after his ascension to the throne in 1911, unlike his father who lived in Chowmahalla Palace. Passers-by then carved "K K" on the accessible walls of the palace, which irked its royal resident. He then passed a Royal charter to name the building King Kothi or "King's Mansion".

== Commercial value ==
Koti is famous for the book business. A wide variety of bookshops are located here. Bank Street in Koti is a financial center of Hyderabad city. Important national and private banks are located here like the Central Bank of India, State Bank of India, Andhra Bank etc.

The famous Gokul chat shop, which was involved on 25 August 2007 bombings is located in Koti. Close to Koti is the Abids area, which is a similar commercial area.

Osmania Medical College campus is located in this area. It is one of the oldest medical colleges in India. Directorate of Medical Education and Directorate of Health and Telangana branch of Indian Medical Association are also located in this region.

Tech Mahindra also established an Institute named Tech Mahindra Foundation to improve skills of degree holders in order to increase the chances of employment. It is located near Women's College Bus stop.

== Transport ==
Mahatma Gandhi Bus Station located close to Koti is a major bus station, and is a road transport gateway to the city. This station is located across the Musi river. This bus station is said to be one of the largest in India and provides transport to all parts of the state and country. The Osmania medical college is the nearest metro station to Koti.

The local city bus terminus is located at women's college of Koti, opposite Andhra Bank, and government hospital. Bus stop opposite to Andhra Bank- buses go to Secunderabad, Kondapur, Lingampally whereas, bus stop near vaibhav shopping mall go to Afzalgunj, Lingampally, Lakdikapool, Secunderabad, Nampally etc. and from bus stop opposite government hospital buses go to Kushaiguda, ECIL, Secunderabad etc. Bus stop at women college, buses go to Dilsukhnagar, Malakpet, L.B.Nagar, Ibrahimpatnam, Ramoji film city, NGO's colony, Uppal etc. Buses from Bus stop beside vaibhav mall go to Rajendra Nagar, Zoo park, Airport etc.

The closest MMTS Train Station and railway station is at Kachiguda considered the best to board or arrive from out state destination trains in Hyderabad. Koti is also well connected to the Hyderabad Metro system with the Osmania Medical College (Red Line), Sultan Bazaar and MG Bus Station (Green Line) Stations.
