= Siddhartha Medical College =

Medical school in Vijayawada, India

- Motto: ఆత్మ దీపో భవ
- Motto in English: Be your own light
- Type: Education and Medicine Institution
- Established: November 1980; 45 years ago
- Affiliations: Dr. NTR University of Health Sciences, NMC
- Principal: Dr. A. Yedukondala Rao
- Location: Vijayawada, Andhra Pradesh, India; 16°31′4.13″N 80°40′16.13″E
- Campus: Urban, 57 acres (23 ha) of land
- Website: smcvja.in

Siddhartha Medical College is a medical college in Vijayawada, Andhra Pradesh. It provides undergraduate and graduate medical education in AP. It is located in Gunadala, Vijayawada, Andhra Pradesh. It is affiliated to Dr. NTR University of Health Sciences.

== History ==
Siddhartha Medical College was established by Siddhartha Academy of General and Technical Education, Vijayawada-10 in November 1980 with an annual intake of 100 students, which has more recently increased to 175 students. As this is a statewide college, admissions are conducted following six-point formula. The Hon'ble Chief Minister of Andhra Pradesh, the late Sri T. Anjaiah, inaugurated the college on 13 March 1981, and the regular session began on 16 March 1981.

A building complex for Siddhartha Medical College was completed in November 1985 with a floor space of 1,48,000 square feet in an area of 57 acres, and the college was shifted into this new premises on 7 November 1985.

The A. P. University of Health Sciences was established on 1 November 1986, in Vijayawada by the Government of Andhra Pradesh. On 21 December 1986, Siddhartha Medical College was transferred by the Siddhartha Academy of General & Technical Education to the A. P. University of Health Sciences. The Government of Andhra Pradesh disaffiliated the college from NTR University of Health Sciences on 21 December 2000, and brought this college under the administrative control of the Director of Medical Education. The Medical Council of India later re-linked the college with NTR University of Health Sciences.The college name is changed from Siddhartha Medical College to Govt. Siddhartha Medical College for administrative purpose.

== Teaching hospitals ==
Siddhartha Medical College is affiliated with the following Government Teaching Hospitals in Vijayawada. The students rotate in the departments of the teaching hospitals according to their education requirements.

- Government General Hospital(GGH), Vijayawada: It was inaugurated by the Hon'ble Minister, Rajah of Palatal, at the old city near the railway station and later relocated to its branch in Gunadala, Vijayawada. It is a 412-bed, multi-specialty public hospital operated by the Government of Andhra Pradesh. It is a teaching facility for medical students, residents, and nurses of Siddhartha Medical College and NTR University of Health Sciences. It is situated in the heart of Vijayawada metro next to NTR University and Siddhartha Medical College. It provides primary care for outpatients and inpatient services. The specialities include internal medicine, general surgery, obstetrics and gynecology, pediatrics, neonatal intensive care unit, acute medical care unit, cardiology, nephrology, gastroenterology, neurology, endocrinology and diabetic care. The hospital is managed by the Government of Andhra Pradesh under the Directorate of Medical Education. Services are provided free of charge regardless of income, insurance status, race, gender, or country of origin.
- Mangalagiri General Hospital: This 180-bed rural hospital serves the residents of Mangalagiri and the surrounding villages.
- Mangalagiri TB Sanitarium: This 30-bed hospital, located near the Mangalagiri reserve forest area and away from public housing, is dedicated exclusively to tuberculosis treatment. It was founded by the state government in 1959 and became a part of the teaching facility of Siddhartha Medical College in 1983.

== Departments ==
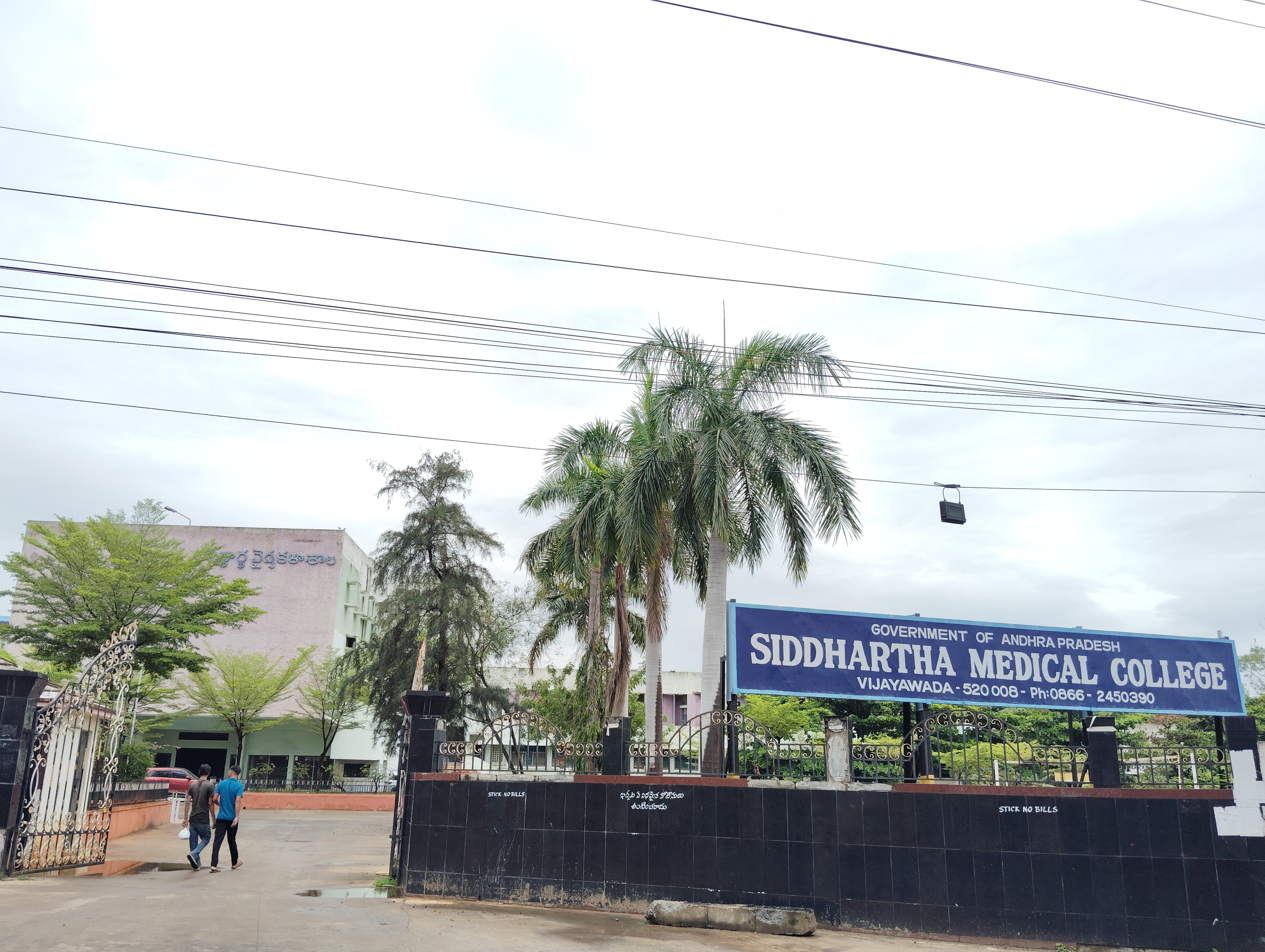
Siddhartha Medical College campus, Vijayawada

Siddhartha Medical College has many departments in both preclinical, para clinical and clinical subjects. It has extensive library and laboratories in each department.

Pre Clinical:

- Anatomy
- Physiology
- Bio chemistry

Para Clinical:

- Pharmacology
- Microbiology
- Pathology
- Forensic Medicine

Clinical:

- General Medicine
- General Surgery
- Pediatrics
- Gynecology and Obstetrics
- Orthopedics
- Pulmonary Medicine
- Social and Preventive Medicine
- ENT
- Ophthalmology
- Anesthesia
- Neurosurgery
- Plastic Surgery
- Emergency Medicine
- Dermatology and Meteorology
- Trauma Care
- Psychiatry
- Gastroenterology
- Cardiology

== Notable alumni ==
Raghu Ram Pillarisetti
