= Raghu Ram Pillarisetti =

Indian surgeon

Dr. Raghu Ram Pillarisetti OBE
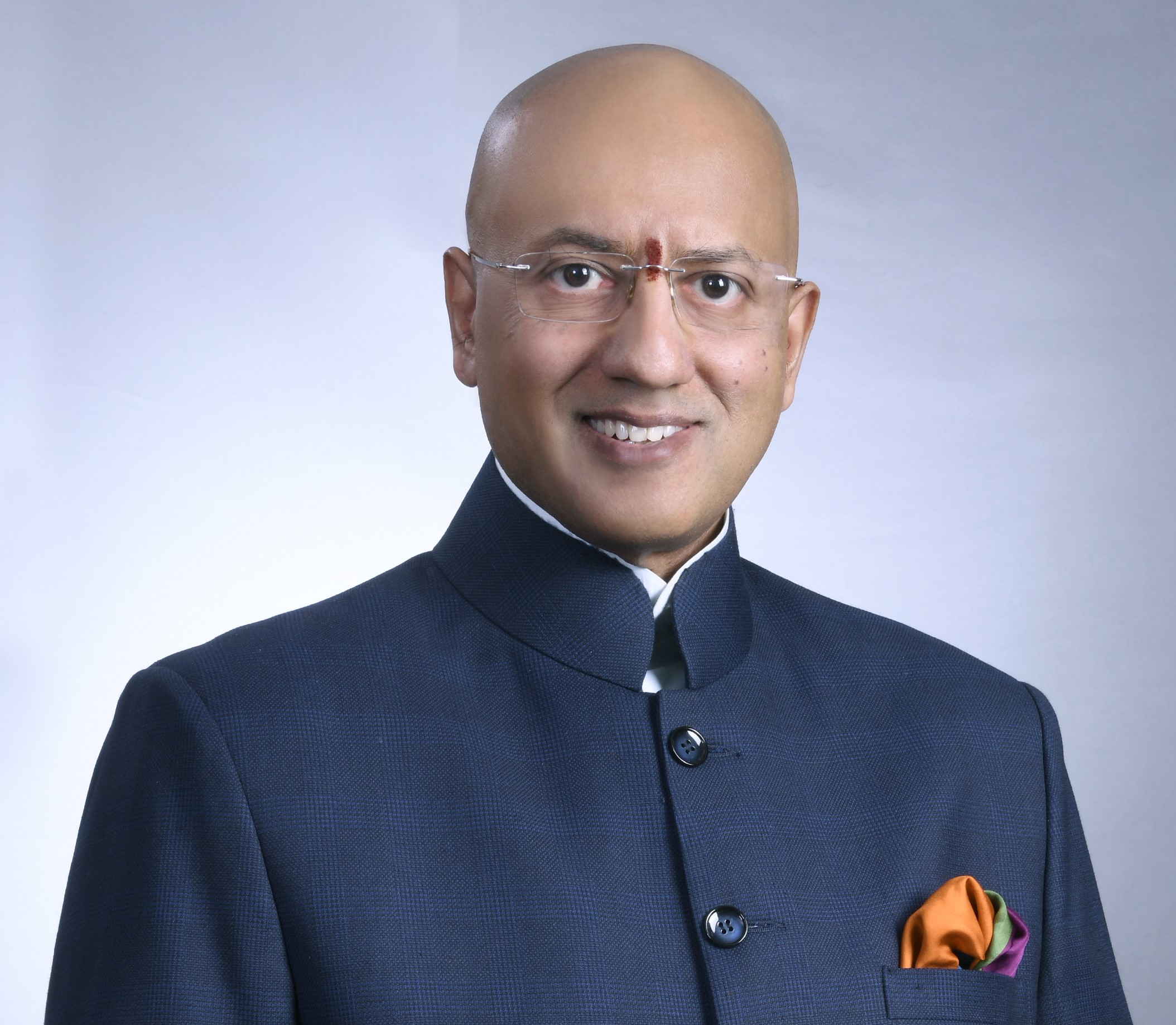
- Born: 22 September 1966 (age 60); Guntur, Andhra Pradesh, India
- Education: Siddhartha Medical College
- Occupations: Founder, Ushalakshmi Breast Cancer Foundation & Director, KIMS-Ushalakshmi Centre for Breast Diseases
- Known for: Breast Cancer Advocacy, Screening & Breast surgery
- Awards: 2026 - Guinness World Records 2025 - Honorary FRCS (Glasgow) 2025 - Guinness World Records 2024 – Honorary Fellowship, International Society of Surgery; 2024 – Honorary Fellowship, American Surgical Association; 2024 – India-UK Achievers award 2023 – ASI Lifetime Achievement award 2022 - Honorary FRCS (England): 2021 - Order of the British Empire (OBE); 2016 - Dr B C Roy award; 2015 - Padma Shri; 2015 - Edward Kennedy Memorial award; 2013 - RSCEd Overseas Gold Medal
- Website: breastcancerindia.org

Dr. Raghu Ram Pillarisetti OBE is an Indian surgeon, and the Founder and Director of KIMS-Ushalakshmi Center for Breast Diseases at KIMS Hospitals. Pillarisetti is the founder of Ushalakshmi Breast Cancer Foundation, a not-for-profit organisation, and Pink Connexion, a quarterly newsletter about breast healthcare.

He is the youngest Surgeon of Indian origin to have been conferred Honorary FRCS by the Royal College of Surgeons of England. He is also the youngest recipient of the Overseas Gold Medal of the Royal College of Surgeons of Edinburgh and In 2021, he became the first surgeon of Indian origin to be conferred the Honorary Fellowship of the Association of Surgeons of Great Britain and Ireland. He is one of the youngest Surgeons of Indian origin in over 100 years to be honoured with an OBE – Officer of the Most Excellent Order of the British Empire. He has also secured three Guinness World Records titles (2025–2026) for breast health awareness initiatives.

== Early life and education ==
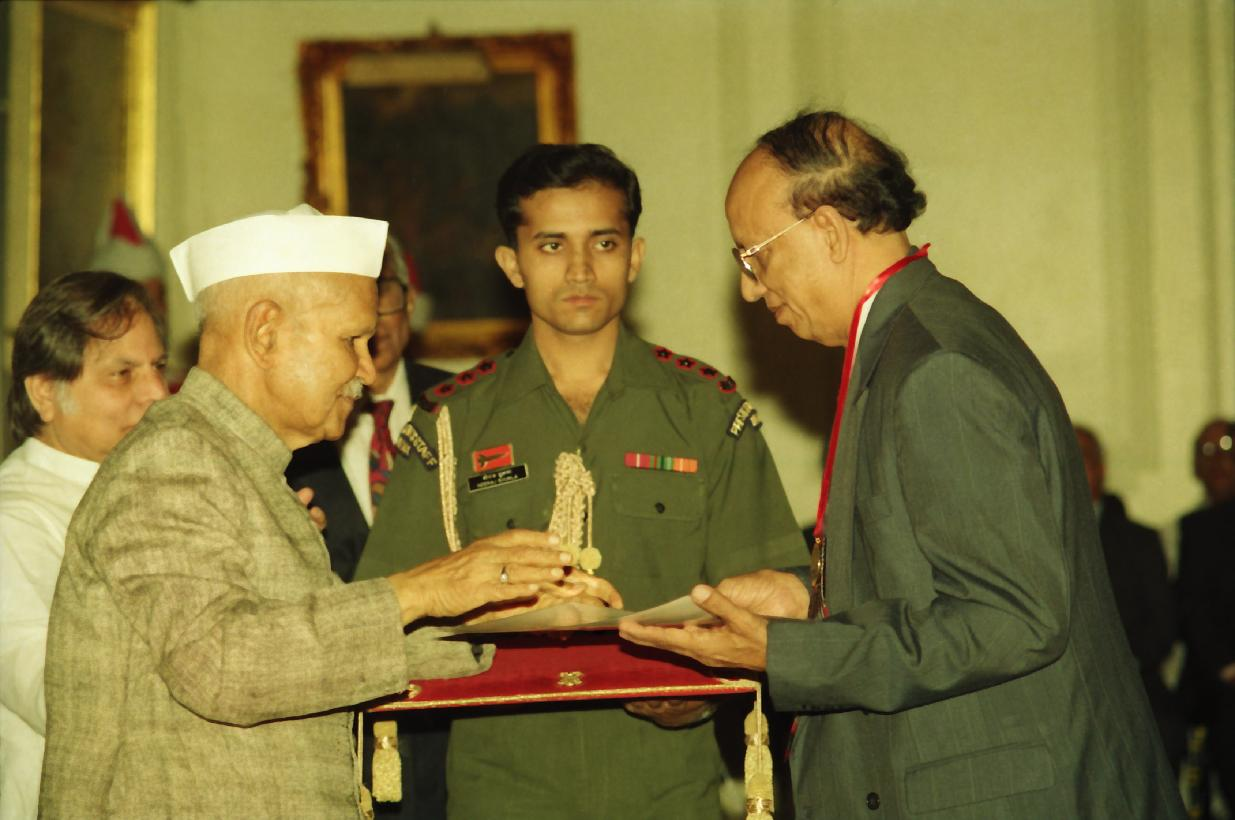
His father receiving the Dr. B. C. Roy National Award from the President of India

Pillarisetti was born on 22 September 1966, in Guntur, in the undivided state of Andhra Pradesh, in India, to medical doctor parents, Prof. P. V. Chalapathi Rao, a recipient of Dr. B.C. Roy National Award, and Ushalakshmi Kumari, a breast cancer survivor. He did his schooling from the Hyderabad Public School, where one of his classmates was Satya Nadella, the chairman and CEO of Microsoft. He graduated in medicine (MBBS) from Siddhartha Medical College, and secured a master's degree in surgery (MS), obtaining the first place, from Kasturba Medical College, in 1995. He then went to UK and obtained FRCS in 1997 from all the four Surgical Royal Colleges in the British Isles (England, Edinburgh, Glasgow, Ireland). He subsequently completed Higher Surgical Training & subspecialty training in oncoplastic breast surgery at the Royal Marsden NHS Foundation Trust in London and at the Nottingham Breast Institute. He also holds a fellowship of the American College of Surgeons.

== Career ==
In 2002, Pillarisetti's mother was diagnosed with breast cancer. He relocated to India in 2007 and established a dedicated purpose-built facility for breast health care at KIMS Hospitals in Hyderabad. The centre, KIMS-Ushalakshmi Center for Breast Diseases, bears his mother's name (Ushalakshmi).

Pillarisetti founded Ushalakshmi Breast Cancer Foundation, with Amitabh Bachchan and P. V. Sindhu as its ambassadors, for spreading awareness about the disease and, later, started publishing Pink Connexion, a quarterly newsletter. Since 2007, the annual "Pink Ribbon Campaign" was launched to raise awareness on breast cancer during the month of October (international breast cancer awareness month).

Between 2012 – 2016, he has overseen the implementation of south Asia's largest population-based breast cancer screening programme in the southern Indian states of Telangana and Andhra Pradesh. Women diagnosed with breast cancer were treated free of cost under the State Government's Arogyasree scheme.

In 2016, the Government of India invited him to be part of the Steering Committee and a high powered Technical Advisory Group (TAG) set up by the Union Ministry of Health, which has drafted guidelines to replicate the Clinical Breast Examination (CBE) based breast cancer screening programme across the nation.

He served as an International Surgical Adviser of the Royal College of Surgeons of Edinburgh from 2012 - 2020, and was appointed as International Advisor for the Royal College of Physicians & Surgeons of Glasgow from 2023 - 2026.

He is one of the youngest surgeons elected to serve as president, The Association of Surgeons of India (ASI) for the year 2020. ASI is South Asia's largest and the world's second largest surgical organization that represents the surgical fraternity in India. As President ASI, he launched five Skills Courses & the National Online Skills Enhancement Programme (NSEP) in 2020, which are aimed to enhance the knowledge base & improve the skill sets of surgical trainees.

As Convenor of International Affairs for the Association of Surgeons of India (2017 – 2018), he initiated a working partnership between the Association of Surgeons of India and the Royal College of Surgeons of England, thereby facilitating the process of selecting surgical trainees from India to obtain advanced subspecialty surgical training at selected centres of excellence in the UK through the Royal College's International Surgical Training Programme (ISTP).

He was a member of the governing council of the Association of Surgeons of India from 2013 – 2015 and served as its overseas coordinator between 2009 and 2012.

He served as the founder Honorary Secretary (2011–13), Vice President (2013–14) and as President (2015 – 2017) of the Association of Breast Surgeons of India (ABSI), the youngest in the organization's history. He also started the 'ABSI-UK Fellowship Programme', which allows surgical trainees from India selected on merit to obtain 'hands on' one year subspecialty training in breast centres of excellence in the UK

He served as a member of the board of advocates of the American Society of Breast Surgeons in 2009, the first surgeon from outside USA to sit in the board.

He has been associated with the Indian Association of Surgical Oncology as a member, as its overseas coordinator (2005–08), as the editorial secretary (2009–10), as a member of the executive committee (2011–12) and as the joint editor of its official journal, Indian Journal of Surgical Oncology (IJSO) (2010–14).

He is the author of many articles on breast healthcare and has contributed nine chapters in three text books including the text book series, Recent Advances in Surgery and Bailey & Love Revision Guide.

== Awards and recognition ==
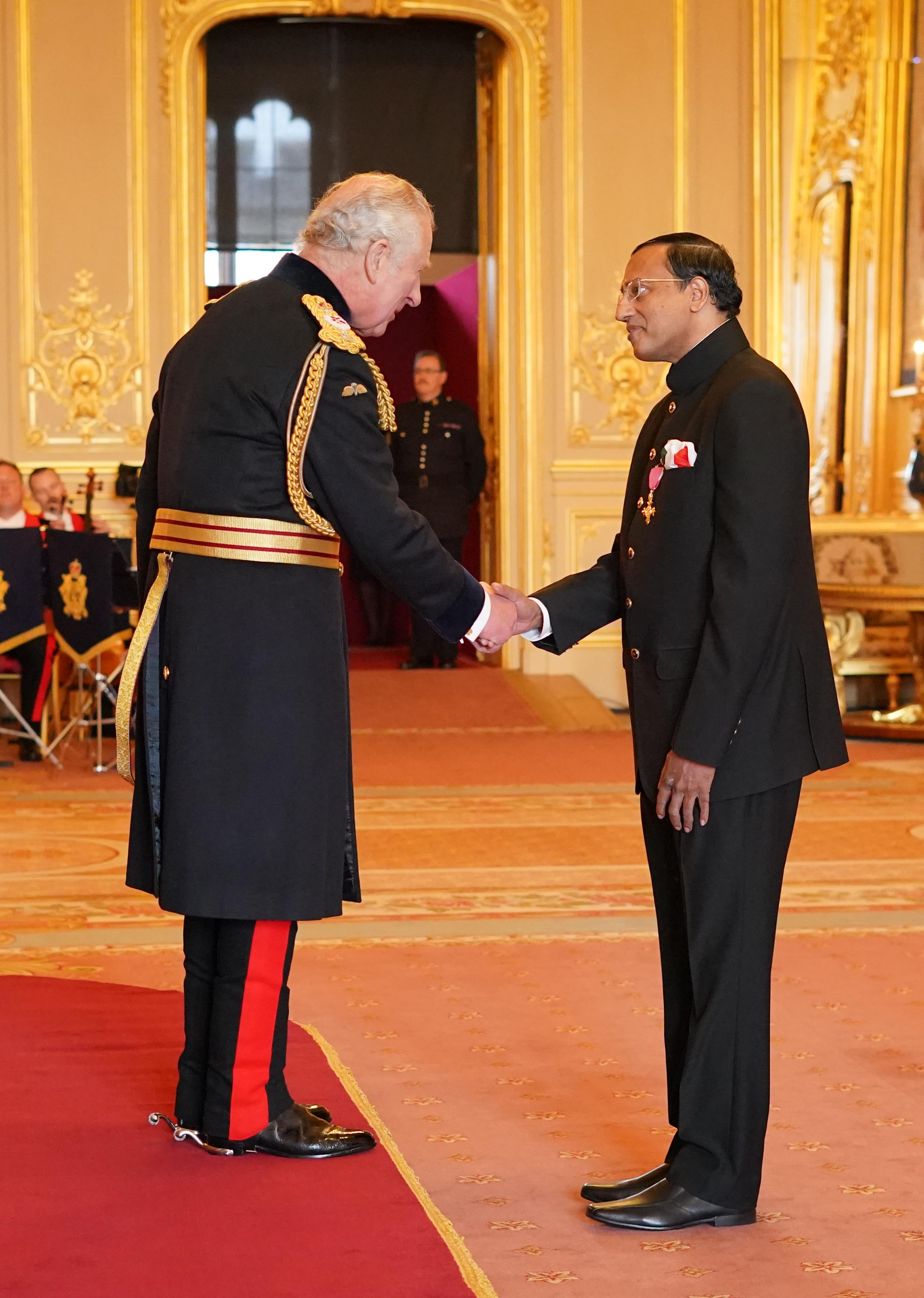
Officer of the Most Excellent Order of the British Empire

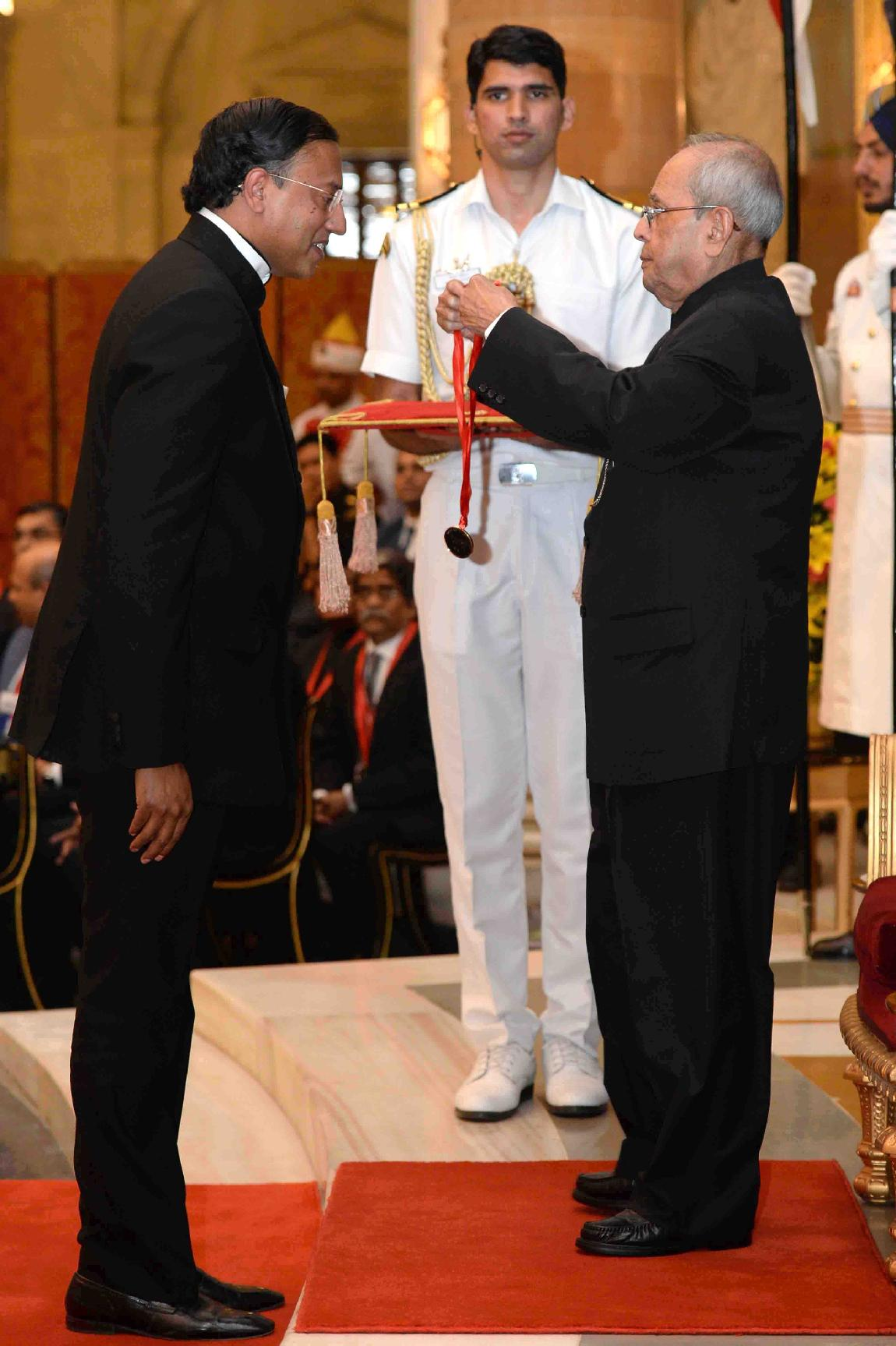
Dr. B. C. Roy National Award

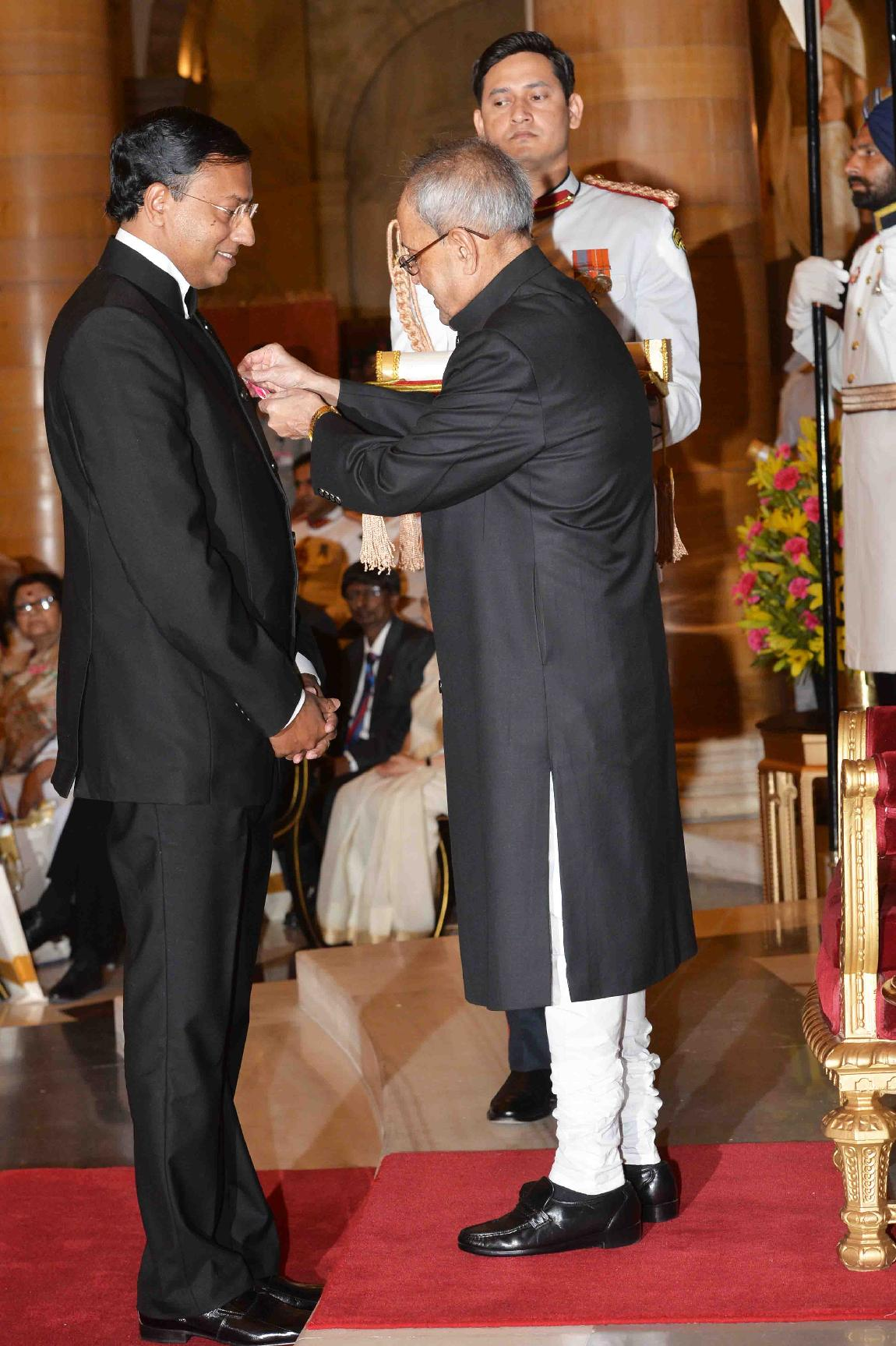
Padma Shri

Ram features in the 2021 Queen Elizabeth II New Year's honours list and is one of the youngest Surgeons of Indian origin in over 100 years to be honoured with an OBE – Officer of the Most Excellent Order of the British Empire, conferred in recognition of his services to breast cancer care and surgical education in India and to UK-India relations. He was formally conferred the OBE on 30 March 2022 at Windsor Castle by His Royal Highness Prince Charles, Prince of Wales.

The Government of India included Ram in the 2015 Republic day honours list for the fourth highest Indian civilian award of Padma Shri, making him the youngest surgeon from the southern Indian states of Telangana & Andhra Pradesh to have been conferred the award by the President of India.

In 2017, the Medical council of India selected him for the Dr B C Roy National award for 'Outstanding service in the field of Socio Medical Relief' for 2016.

In 2021, he became the first surgeon of Indian origin to be conferred the Honorary Fellowship of The Association of Surgeons of Great Britain & Ireland.

In October 2021, he delivered the "Distinguished Lecture" of the United States Chapter of International Society of Surgery on "Disrupting Breast Healthcare in India" at the 107th annual Congress of the American College of Surgeons (ACS). He was amongst the eleven doctors alongside Anthony Fauci and was the only surgeon from outside the US to have delivered the 'Named Lecture" at the world's largest Surgical Congress.

In 2022, he became the youngest Surgeon of Indian origin to have been conferred Honorary FRCS by the Royal College of Surgeons of England. He was also conferred Honorary Fellowship (Hon.FCCS) from the Chinese College of Surgeons and Honorary Fellowship (Hon.FCSSL) from the College of Surgeons of Sri Lanka in 2020 In 2019, he was conferred Honorary Fellowship (Hon.FRCS) by the Royal College of Surgeons of Thailand

In 2023, he was conferred the ASI Lifetime Achievement award by The Association of Surgeons of India, which is the highest honour bestowed by Asia Pacific’s largest & the world’s second largest surgical Organisation.

He is also one of the youngest recipients of Lifetime Achievement award bestowed by the Telugu Association of London in April 2003 and is the first person of Indian origin residing outside of the UK to be conferred with this high honour for his singular contribution towards improving breast cancer care in India.

In Feb 2024, the Commonwealth Assistant Secretary General, Prof Luis Gabriel Franceschi presented him with “INDIA-UK Achievers award” in the category “Education, Science & Innovation”. This award was instituted by National Indian Students and Alumni Union (NISAU) in partnership with the British Council and the UK Government.

In April 2024, he was conferred Honorary Fellowship of American Surgical Association (ASA), which is the highest recognition that ASA can bestow upon a surgical colleague from a foreign country. He is the third surgeon from South Asia to receive this high honour in the 144 years history of America’s oldest and most prestigious Surgical Organisation.

In August 2024, he achieved the rare distinction to become the First & only Surgeon from Indian Subcontinent in the 122 years history of International Society of Surgery to be conferred Honorary Fellowship.

In March 2025, he achieved two Guinness World Records — one for conducting the “Largest Breast Cancer Awareness Lesson” and another for securing the “Most Views for a Breast Cancer Awareness Lesson on YouTube in 24 Hours.”

In June 2026, he secured a third Guinness World Records title for the "Largest Audience at an Interactive AI-Enabled Holographic Health Awareness Lecture". The event integrated medicine, artificial intelligence and immersive holographic technology to deliver evidence-based education on benign breast conditions and breast cancer through a live educational lecture followed by a multilingual interactive question-and-answer session.

In September 2025, he was conferred the Honorary Fellowship of the Royal College of Physicians and Surgeons of Glasgow (FRCS Glasgow), the College’s highest honour.

He is reported to be the youngest surgeon from South Asia to receive this distinction. He also holds the distinction of being both a Fellow of the same College by examination and an Honorary Fellow.

He received the Overseas Gold Medal from the Royal College of Surgeons of Edinburgh in 2013, the youngest ever recipient of the award in the 515 years history of the college.

He is a recipient of Visishta Ugadi Puraskar, which is a State award conferred by the Government of undivided Andhra Pradesh and Vishal Bharat Ugadi Puraskar by the Delhi Telugu Academy.

He was made a Paul Harris Fellow by the Rotary International to recognise his contribution to the Rotary Foundation and conferred the Vocational Excellence award by the Rotary Club of Jubilee Hills for his service in Breast Oncology.

He is a recipient of the Edward Kennedy Memorial Award for 'improving the art and science of Breast Oncology in South Asia'.

He is one of the youngest surgeons and the only one from the southern Indian States of Telangana and Andhra Pradesh to have delivered Col. Pandalai Oration (2018), which is the highest academic honour that can be achieved by a surgeon practicing in India.

== COVID 19 response ==
Pillarisetti was invited to be part of a UNICEF campaign in partnership with the Government of India to create awareness about COVID-19.

In May 2021, to address the rapidly rising infections and deaths associated with COVID-19 in Rural India, under the auspices of Ushalakshmi Breast Cancer Foundation & KIMS-USHALAKSHMI Centre for Breast Diseases in Hyderabad, Pillarisetti went on the "COVID-19 Pink Ribbon Mask Campaign" in the southern Indian State of Telangana. 20,000 masks have been distributed to residents in all the ten villages in Narayanaraopet Mandal, Siddipet in the State of Telangana (Narayanaraopet, Ibrahimpur, Banajerupally, Kondandaraopally, Laxmidevipally, Malyala, Gurralagondi, Jakkapur, Gopulapur, Matindla).

In his capacity as president, The Association of Surgeons of India, he championed a major fund-raising movement from the surgical fraternity and organised the procurement/delivery of the Personal Protection Equipment for healthcare professionals across India, which was in acute shortage at that time.

== Philanthropy ==
In 2015, he adopted Ibrahimpur, the remotest village in Medak District in the State of Telangana, which has a population of 1500.
