= Bhaskar Rao Bollineni =

Indian entrepreneur

- Born: Suresh
- Education: Rangaraya Medical College; Madras Medical College
- Occupations: Cardiologist, businessman
- Organization: Krishna Institute of Medical Sciences Ltd

Bhaskar Rao Bollineni is an Indian entrepreneur and cardiothoracic surgeon who founded the chain of KIMS Hospitals in Andhra Pradesh, Telangana and Maharashtra.

== Background ==
Bhaskar Rao Bollineni completed his medical education from Rangaraya Medical College, Kakinada, and Masters from Madras Medical College, Chennai. After practicing in Medwin Hospitals & Mahavir Trust Hospital, he started the KIMS Group of hospitals with a first hospital in Nellore. Currently, the chain has 12 hospitals across Andhra Pradesh and Telangana.

As a surgeon he has performed over 30,000 surgeries. Bhaskar Rao was also an important part of the Rajiv Gandhi Aarogyasri Scheme, launched in 2007 in combined Andhra Pradesh for providing health care to the economically weaker sections.

He was shortlisted as a finalist at EY Entrepreneur of the Year Award 2019. Bhaskar Rao is married to Rajyasree, daughter of former Chief Minister of Andhra Pradesh, Bhavanam Venkatarami Reddy, and has two sons, both of them are associated with the KIMS Group of Hospitals.

== Awards ==
- 2019 Finalist, EY Entrepreneur of the Year Award
- 2017 Times Healthcare Achievers Award
- 2017 Times Healthcare Lifetime Achievers Award
- 2021 Lifetime Award by Hybiz Healthcare Awards 2021
