= Aravalli =

Aravalli may refer to:

- Aravalli Range, a mountain range in north-west India
  - Aravalli district, a district in the state of Gujarat in India
- Aravalli, West Godavari, a village in Andhra Pradesh, India
- Aravalli (film), a 1957 Indian Tamil-language fantasy-action film
