= Brahmajosyula Subrahmanyam =

Brahmajosyula Subrahmanyam (1891–1936) was an Indian social activist. He was strongly influenced Mahatma Gandhi and Gandhism.

== Early life ==
He was born in Rajahmundry in British India.

== Gautami Satyagraha Ashram ==
The Gautami Satyagraha ashram was started on 4 February 1925 by Subrahmanyam, on the banks of Godavari river. The river played a revolutionary role during India's freedom struggle. In the East Godavari district Subrahmanyam propagated the Khaddar with great enthusiasm, which was a part of the Swadeshi movement. One of the main aims of the ashram was to initiate the Khaddar programme throughout the district.

== Role ==
When Poorna swaraj was declared in 1929 by Jawaharlal Nehru and Netaji, Subrahmanyam and Bulusu Sambamurthy stood by them. While Sambamurthy served as president of the Andhra wing of the Indian Independence League, Subrahmanyam served as secretary.

== Recognition ==
When Subrahmanyam died in 1936 Mahatma Gandhi had conveyed his condolences via Telegram

CONGRESS CAMP 
24/12/1936 

" SUBRAHMANYAM'S DEATH GREAT BLOW. HIS HUMILITY, SACRIFICE AND STEADFASTNESS WERE ALL HIS OWN. MY SYMPATHY WITH HIS FAMILY MEMBERS AND HIS ASHRAM "

GANDHI

Subramanya Maidanam in Rajahmundry was known as 'Police Parade Grounds' till 15 August 1947. On Independence Day Col. D. S. Raju named it as Subrahmanya Maidanam in honour of Brahmajosyula Subrahmanyam, who was a freedom fighter from Rajahmundry.
