= Karumuri Venkata Nageswara Rao =

Indian politician (born 1964)

Minister for Civil Supplies and Consumer Affairs Government of Andhra Pradesh
- In office 11 April 2022 – 4 June 2024
- Governor: Biswabhusan Harichandan; S. Abdul Nazeer
- Chief Minister: Y. S. Jagan Mohan Reddy
- Preceded by: Kodali Nani

General Secretary of the Yuvajana Shramika Rythu Congress Party
- Incumbent
- Assumed office 2014 - Present
- President: Y. S. Jagan Mohan Reddy

Member of Legislative Assembly Andhra Pradesh
- In office 2019–2024
- Preceded by: Arimilli Radha Krishna
- Succeeded by: Arimilli Radha Krishna
- Constituency: Tanuku
- In office 2009–2014
- Preceded by: Chitturi Bapineedu
- Succeeded by: Arimilli Radha Krishna
- Constituency: Tanuku

Personal details
- Born: 2 October 1964 (age 61) Attili, West Godavari district, Andhra Pradesh, India
- Party: YSR Congress Party
- Spouse: Karumuri Lakshmi Kiran (1989- present)
- Children: 2
- Occupation: Politician, Businessman
- Website: karumurionline.com

Karumuri Venkata Nageswara Rao (born 2 October 1964) is the former minister for Civil Supplies and consumer affairs in Andhra Pradesh government. He is Member of the Legislative Assembly of the Indian state of Andhra Pradesh, representing Tanuku. He is a member of the YSR Congress party. He started his political career in Congress Party, he was General Secretary of Andhra Pradesh Congress Committee from 2009 to 2014. He also served as chairperson for West Godavari Zilla Parishad for three years before being elected as MLA for the first time in 2009. He was awarded honorary doctorate in social service by Westbrook University, US in 2007. He has been appointed General Secretary of Andhra Pradesh Congress Committee on 9 June 2013. He was elected for second term as MLA from Tanuku in 2019 elections representing YSR Congress. He is the former cabinet Minister for Civil Supplies and Consumer Affairs in Andhra Pradesh.

== Early life and family ==
Karumuri Nageswara Rao was born to Karumuri Ramakrishna and Karumuri Suryakathamma 2 October 1964, in Attili, West Godavari district. He moved to Hyderabad at the age of 18 and started his own business. He has two sisters and a brother who is a chemistry professor in Tanuku. In 1989 he was married to Lakshmi Kiran. The couple have a son and daughter.
