= Eduru =

- village
- Interactive map of Eduru
- Location of Attili mandal in Andhra Pradesh, India Eduru (India)
- Coordinates: 16.706161°N 81.592403°E
- Country: India
- State: Andhra Pradesh
- District: West Godavari
- Mandal: Attili

Population (2011)
  - Total: 4,116

Languages
  - Official: Telugu
- Time zone: UTC+5:30 (IST)
- PIN: 534 134
- Telephone code: 08812

Eduru is a village in West Godavari district in the state of Andhra Pradesh in India. The nearest railway station is at Krishnapatnam (KAPT) located at a distance of 15.83 km

== Demographics ==
As of 2011 India census, Eduru has a population of 2323 of which 1192 are males while 1131 are females. The average sex ratio of Eduru village is 949. The child population is 384, which makes up 9.99% of the total population of the village, with sex ratio 983. In 2011, the literacy rate of Eduru village was 74.61% when compared to 67.02% of Andhra Pradesh.

== See also ==
- Eluru
