= Kanchumarru =

- village
- Interactive map of Kanchumarru
- Location of Attili mandal in Andhra Pradesh, India Kanchumarru (India)
- Coordinates: 16.639029°N 81.592718°E
- Country: India
- State: Andhra Pradesh
- District: West Godavari
- Mandal: Attili

Population (2011)
  - Total: 2,087

Languages
  - Official: Telugu
- Time zone: UTC+5:30 (IST)
- PIN: 534 134
- Telephone code: 08812

Kanchumarru is a village in West Godavari district in the state of Andhra Pradesh in India. Aravalli railway Station and Manchili railway Station are the nearest train stations.

== Demographics ==
As of 2011 India census, Kanchumarru has a population of 2087 of which 1060 are males while 1027 are females. The average sex ratio of Kanchumarru village is 969. The child population is 182, which makes up 8.72% of the total population of the village, with sex ratio 896. In 2011, the literacy rate of Kanchumarru village was 63.88% when compared to 67.02% of Andhra Pradesh.

== See also ==
- Eluru
