= Datla Satyanarayana Raju =

Indian politician (1904-1973)

- In office 1957–1971 (MP)
- Constituency: Rajahmundry

Personal details
- Born: 28 August 1904 Poduru, West Godavari district, Madras Presidency, British India (present-day Andhra Pradesh, India)
- Died: 1973 (aged 68–69)
- Party: Indian National Congress
- Children: 1 son and 3 daughters
- Education: Andhra Medical College
- Occupation: Doctor, colonel, parliamentarian
- Website: 164.100.47.132/LssNew/biodata_1_12/1317.htm

Datla Satyanarayana Raju, better known as D. S. Raju M.B.B.S., L.R.C.P., M.R.C.S., M.R.C.P.(London) (born 28 August 1904, date of death unknown) was an Indian Parliamentarian. He was born to Datla Ramachandra Raju in Poduru, West Godavari District in 1904. He was educated at Andhra Medical College, Visakhapatnam, Guy's Hospital, London and Chest Clinic, Vienna. He was a Permanent Commissioned Officer as a Major in the Indian Military from 1934 to 1945. A multi faceted personality with a rare distinction of being an outstanding doctor, a freedom fighter, a union minister and a philanthropist.

He was founder and president of the Medical Education Society in Kakinada. Along with Dr. M. V. Krishna Rao, he was instrumental in establishing the Rangaraya Medical College in Kakinada in 1958. Their main objects are promoting Medical Education, Medical research and Medical relief through voluntary effort. Sri Mullapudi Harishchandra Prasad offered a donation of five lakhs for the college. The college was named at his request after his late brother-in-law Sri. Pendyala. Ranga Rao, Zamindar of Dommeru and Sri Mullapudi Venkata Rayudu Memorial Educational Trust. He was personal doctor to Netaji Subhash Chandra Bose

He was elected for the 2nd Lok Sabha, 3rd Lok Sabha and 4th Lok Sabha from Rajahmundry (Lok Sabha constituency) in 1957, 1962 and 1967 respectively as a member of Indian National Congress. He was Deputy Minister of Health, Government of India, 1962–64 and Deputy Minister of Defence, 1964–66. He has also represented India at World Health Conference held in Geneva. He was Honoured by Andhra Pradesh Government by naming Andhra Pradesh Residential School in Bhupathipalem near Gokavaram as Dr.D.S.Raju Andhra Pradesh Residential School.
