= Varighedu =

- village
- Interactive map of Varighedu
- Location of Attili mandal in Andhra Pradesh, India Varighedu (India)
- Coordinates: 16.737951°N 81.620946°E
- Country: India
- State: Andhra Pradesh
- District: West Godavari
- Mandal: Attili

Population (2011)
  - Total: 4,133

Languages
  - Official: Telugu
- Time zone: UTC+5:30 (IST)
- PIN: 534 225
- Telephone code: 08812

Varighedu is a village in West Godavari district in the state of Andhra Pradesh in India.

== Demographics ==
As of 2011 India census, Varighedu has a population of 4133 of which 2063 are males while 2070 are females. The average sex ratio of Varighedu village is 1003. The child population is 385, which makes up 9.32% of the total population of the village, with sex ratio 1139. In 2011, the literacy rate of Varighedu village was 84.56% when compared to 71.00% of Andhra Pradesh.

== See also ==
- Eluru
