= Skinnerapuram =

- village
- Interactive map of Skinnerapuram
- Location of Attili mandal in Andhra Pradesh, India Skinnerapuram (India)
- Coordinates: 16.622390°N 81.578368°E
- Country: India
- State: Andhra Pradesh
- District: West Godavari
- Mandal: Attili

Population (2011)
  - Total: 2,035

Languages
  - Official: Telugu
- Time zone: UTC+5:30 (IST)
- PIN: 534 230
- Telephone code: 08812

Skinnerapuram is a village in West Godavari district in the state of Andhra Pradesh in India.

== Demographics ==
As of 2011 India census, Skinnerapuram has a population of 2035 of which 1019 are males while 1016 are females. The average sex ratio of Skinnerapuram village is 997. The child population is 213, which makes up 10.47% of the total population of the village, with sex ratio 885. In 2011, the literacy rate of Skinnerapuram village was 78.43% when compared to 67.02% of Andhra Pradesh.

== See also ==
- Eluru
