= Arimilli Radha Krishna =

Indian politician

Arimilli Radhakrishna

Member of the Andhra Pradesh Legislative Assembly
- Incumbent
- Assumed office 2024
- Constituency: Tanuku
- Preceded by: Karumuri Venkata Nageswara Rao
- In office 2014–2019
- Preceded by: Karumuri Venkata Nageswara Rao
- Succeeded by: Karumuri Venkata Nageswara Rao
- Constituency: Tanuku

Personal details
- Born: 25 October 1973 (age 52)
- Party: Telugu Desam Party
- Occupation: Politician

Arimilli Radha Krishna is an Indian politician representing the Telugu Desam Party. He is a Member of the Legislative Assembly from the Tanuku assembly constituency, Andhra Pradesh. He has previously served as the Member of the Legislative assembly from Tanuku during the 2014-2019 period.
