= Gummampadu =

- village
- Interactive map of Gummampadu
- Location of Attili mandal in Andhra Pradesh, India Gummampadu (India)
- Coordinates: 16.718110°N 81.633081°E
- Country: India
- State: Andhra Pradesh
- District: West Godavari
- Mandal: Attili

Population (2011)
  - Total: 1,895

Languages
  - Official: Telugu
- Time zone: UTC+5:30 (IST)
- PIN: 534 134
- Telephone code: 08812

Gummampadu is a village in West Godavari district in the state of Andhra Pradesh in India. Relangi and Velpuru Rail Way Station are the nearest railway stations.

== Demographics ==
As of 2011 India census, Gummampadu has a population of 1895 of which 971 are males while 924 are females. The average sex ratio of Gummampadu village is 952. The child population is 152, which makes up 8.02% of the total population of the village, with sex ratio 854. In 2011, the literacy rate of Gummampadu village was 74.76% when compared to 67.02% of Andhra Pradesh.

== See also ==
- West Godavari district
