= Manchili =

Village in (West Godavari)Andhra Pradesh, India

- Village
- Interactive map of Manchili
- Location of Attili mandal in Andhra Pradesh, India
- Coordinates: 16.663266°N 81.611706°E
- Country: India
- State: Andhra Pradesh
- District: West Godavari
- Mandal: Attili

Population (2011)
  - Total: 5,422

Languages
  - Official: Telugu
- Time zone: UTC+5:30 (IST)
- PIN: 534 134
- Telephone code: 08819

Manchili is a village in West Godavari district in the state of Andhra Pradesh in India.

== Demographics ==
As of 2011 India census, Manchili has a population of 5422 of which 2732 are males while 2690 are females. The average sex ratio of Manchili village is 985. The child population is 490, which makes up 9.04% of the total population of the village, with sex ratio 914. In 2011, the literacy rate of Manchili village was 75.39% when compared to 67.02% of Andhra Pradesh.

Manchili is a village in West Godavari district in the state of Andhra Pradesh in India.
