= Unikili, West Godavari =

Unikili
- village
- Interactive map of Unikili
- Location of Attili mandal in Andhra Pradesh, India Unikili (India)
- Coordinates: 16.613116°N 81.601837°E
- Country: India
- State: Andhra Pradesh
- District: West Godavari
- Mandal: Attili

Population (2011)
  - Total: 5,386

Languages
  - Official: Telugu
- Time zone: UTC+5:30 (IST)
- PIN: 534 230
- Telephone code: 08819

Unikili is a village in West Godavari district in the state of Andhra Pradesh in India.

== Demographics ==
As of 2011 India census, Unikili has a population of 5386 of which 2713 are males while 2673 are females. The average sex ratio of Unikili village is 985. The child population is 461, which makes up 8.56% of the total population of the village, with a sex ratio of 1031. In 2011, the literacy rate of Unikili village was 77.02% when compared to 67.02% of Andhra Pradesh.

== See also ==
- Eluru
