= Pali, West Godavari =

Pali
- village
- Interactive map of Pali
- Location of Attili mandal in Andhra Pradesh, India Pali (India)
- Coordinates: 16.673580°N 81.633686°E
- Country: India
- State: Andhra Pradesh
- District: West Godavari
- Mandal: Attili

Population (2011)
  - Total: 2,628

Languages
  - Official: Telugu
- Time zone: UTC+5:30 (IST)
- PIN: 534 225
- Telephone code: 08812

Pali is a village in West Godavari district in the state of Andhra Pradesh in India.

== Demographics ==
As of 2011 India census, Pali has a population of 2628 of which 1305 are males while 1323 are females. The average sex ratio of Pali village is 1014. The child population is 244, which makes up 9.28% of the total population of the village, with sex ratio 1000. In 2011, the literacy rate of Pali village was 84.56% when compared to 67.02% of Andhra Pradesh.

== See also ==
- Eluru
