= Tirupatipuram =

- village
- Interactive map of Tirupatipuram
- Location of Attili mandal in Andhra Pradesh, India Tirupatipuram (India)
- Coordinates: 16.729680°N 81.602078°E
- Country: India
- State: Andhra Pradesh
- District: West Godavari
- Mandal: Attili

Population (2011)
  - Total: 3,329

Languages
  - Official: Telugu
- Time zone: UTC+5:30 (IST)
- PIN: 534 134
- Telephone code: 08812

Tirupatipuram is a village in West Godavari district in the state of Andhra Pradesh in India.

== Demographics ==
As of 2011 India census, Tirupatipuram has a population of 3329 of which 1684 are males while 1645 are females. The average sex ratio of Tirupatipuram village is 977. The child population is 248, which makes up 7.45% of the total population of the village, with sex ratio 879. In 2011, the literacy rate of Tirupatipuram village was 79.88% when compared to 67.02% of Andhra Pradesh.

== See also ==
- Eluru
