= Kommara, Attili =

Kommara
- village
- Interactive map of Kommara
- Location of Attili mandal in Andhra Pradesh, India Kommara (India)
- Coordinates: 16.665898°N 81.571147°E
- Country: India
- State: Andhra Pradesh
- District: West Godavari
- Mandal: Attili

Population (2011)
  - Total: 2,859

Languages
  - Official: Telugu
- Time zone: UTC+5:30 (IST)
- PIN: 534 134
- Telephone code: 08819

Kommara is a village in West Godavari district in the state of Andhra Pradesh in India.

== Demographics ==
As of 2011 India census, Kommara has a population of 2859 of which 1423 are males while 1436 are females. The average sex ratio of Kommara village is 1009. The child population is 228, which makes up 7.97% of the total population of the village, with sex ratio 1054. In 2011, the literacy rate of Kommara village was 77.96% when compared to 67.02% of Andhra Pradesh.

== See also ==
- Eluru
