= A. V. Gurava Reddy =

Indian orthopedic surgeon

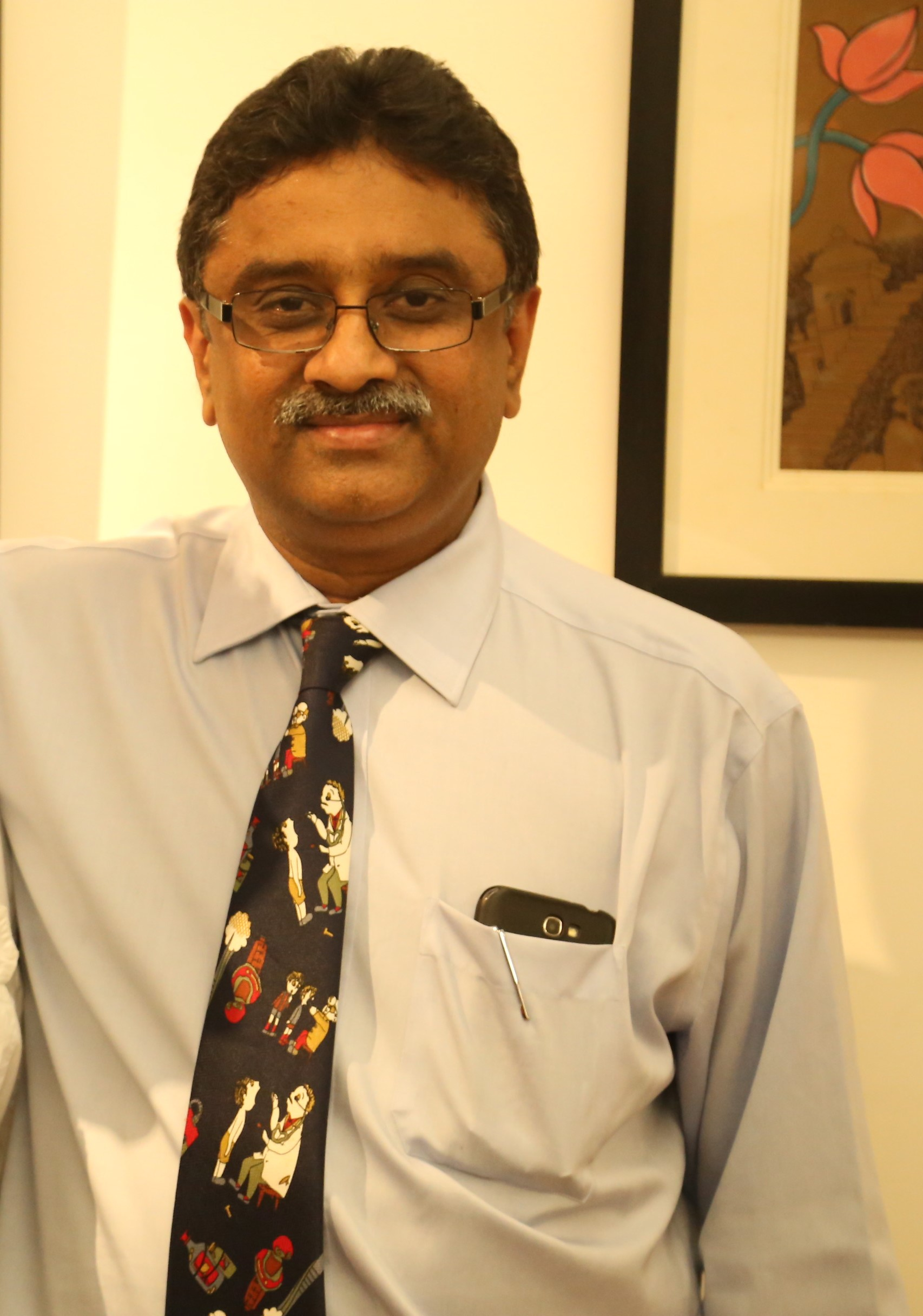
- Orthopedic Surgeon
- Born: Guntur district, Andhra Pradesh, India
- Occupations: Medical Doctor; Managing Director, Sunshine hospitals, Hyderabad, India

A. V. Gurava Reddy is an Indian orthopedic surgeon and Joint replacement expert. He is the managing director and Chief Joint Replacement Surgeon at Sunshine Bone and Joint Institute – Sunshine Hospitals, a 300-bed NABH Accredited, Multispeciality hospital in Hyderabad India. A. V. Gurava Reddy is one of the leading surgeon(s) in India and performs about 4000 joint replacements per year. He has made sustained efforts to increase the awareness and acceptance of Joint replacement surgery in India. In 2021, Sunshine Hospital's majority stake was sold to Krishna Institute of Medical Sciences (hospital group), commonly known as KIMS.

== Education ==
- M.B.B.S From Guntur Institute of Medical Sciences, Andhra Pradesh, India
- D.Ortho-DNB from Sancheti Institute of Orthopedics and Rehabilitation, Pune, India
- M.Ch. Ortho, University of Liverpool, England
- FRCS (London)
- FRCS (Glasgow)
- FRCS (Edinburgh)

== Memberships ==
- Member, Global Advisory Board, Depuy Johnson & Johnson Company
- Member, Global Advisory Committee, Stryker International
- Member, Global International Investigators Committee for CR-150

== Innovations in the field of Arthroplasty ==
- Introduced the concept of Bilateral Simultaneous total knee replacement in India: wherein the patients undergo both knee replacements in the same sitting thereby leading to a shorter period of rehabilitation, shorter stay away from home for outstation patients and reduction in the cost of 30% of cost on consumables to the patient.
- Introduced Bilateral staggered total knee replacement where the patients are not fit due to advanced age or comorbidities, where the knee replacement are done 3 days apart
- Rapid recovery protocol: concept of having selective patients being made to walk within 4 hours of surgery. This involves preemptive analgesia and special intraarticular injections at the time of surgery to give pain relief to the patients. The patients are discharged home after 48 hours and domiciliary care is provided.
- First to introduce "Computer aided navigation for Total knee Replacements" in Andhra Pradesh.

== Academics ==
- Visiting Faculty at Badr-al-Sama Hospital Muscat, Oman
- Visiting Faculty at the Goa Medical College for Revision Knee Arthroplasty
- Chairman of Sunshine Medical Academy of Research & Training
- Program Director, Arthroplasty Fellowship at Sunshine Bone & Joint Institute
- Authored a chapter in the “DELTA” compendium published by Delta group, Australia
- Co-Author, Research Made Easy
- Program Director, Diplomat at National Board (DNB)
- Tutor for FRCS & MRCS Training courses
- Examiner for FRCS/MRCS
- Conducted International & National conferences like DELTA Course, ISHKS
- Trains 10 post MS Orthopaedicians in Arthroplasty fellowships every 6 months and hosts about 40 shorter term trainings from India and abroad

== Clinical Investigator ==
- Conducting research in Collaboration with CCMB to identify Early Biomarkers to diagnose Osteo Arthritis of the Knee and Degenerative disease of the Spine
- Collaborating with the University of Christchurch University, Canterbury UK on Stem cell research for treatment of Knee Arthritis
- Established Level 1 trauma centre at Sunshine Bone and Joint Institute is recognized as an Academic Partner by the GVK EMRI to train the paramedics in Emergency Trauma care and Resuscitation
- Conducted 6th National Conference of Indian Society of Hip & Knee Surgeons (ISHKS) at Sunshine Hospitals.
- Founder Member and Organizing secretary of ISHKS
- Principal Investigator for Multi National, Multi center randomized clinical trial for Depuy knee implant (CR-150 Paper link)
- Published internationally reviewed journal articles

== Awards and honours ==
- Lifetime Achievement Award for Contribution to Healthcare (coordinated by IMA, Govt of AP, Indo-Global)
- Felicitated by Indo-German Orthopedic Foundation
- “Top Adult Reconstructive Orthopedic Surgeon in India” award from Leading physician of the World, USA
- “Outstanding citizen of Andhra Pradesh” by Indian Express Group
- Felicitated with the “Distinguished Doctor” award by British International Doctors Association in recognition of his pioneering
- Felicitated with the “Paul Harris Fellow” by Rotary International
- Excellence Award by Delhi Telugu Academy, Ugadi Puraskar 2010 for contribution in field of medicine.
- “Vocational Excellence Award” by Rotary International District.

== Popular Media ==
- Guruvayanam – A collection of his musings on life
- Member, Editorial Advisory Board for Family Health Guide, Indian Express
- Acted in a comical tele-serial named “Amrutham”
- Columnist in Andhra Jyoti's Navya
- “Dr. Gurava Reddy to kaburlu” – on Radio Tharanga, an Internet global radio as a Radio Jockey and “Life of an Entrepreneur” on Telugu One Radio
- "Dr. Gurava Reddy" - Website

== Selling the Sunshine Hospital stake to KIMS ==
In a notable healthcare deal, the ownership of Sunshine Hospital was transferred to Krishna Institute of Medical Sciences (hospital group), commonly known as KIMS, marking a significant shift in the healthcare industry. The transaction allowed KIMS to gain control over the hospital's operations and assets, potentially enhancing medical services for patients in the region.
