= Paluru =

- village
- Interactive map of Paluru
- Location of Attili mandal in Andhra Pradesh, India Paluru (India)
- Coordinates: 16.673933°N 81.584051°E
- Country: India
- State: Andhra Pradesh
- District: West Godavari
- Mandal: Attili

Population (2011)
  - Total: 2,887

Languages
  - Official: Telugu
- Time zone: UTC+5:30 (IST)
- PIN: 534 134
- Telephone code: 08819

Paluru is a village in West Godavari district in the state of Andhra Pradesh in India.

== Demographics ==
As of 2011 India census, Paluru has a population of 2887 of which 1451 are males while 1436 are females. The average sex ratio of Paluru village is 990. The child population is 288, which makes up 9.98% of the total population of the village, with sex ratio 1014. In 2011, the literacy rate of Paluru village was 72.30% when compared to 67.02% of Andhra Pradesh.

== See also ==
- Eluru
