= Ballipadu, Attili =

Ballipadu
- village
- Interactive map of Ballipadu
- Location of Attili mandal in Andhra Pradesh, India Ballipadu (India)
- Coordinates: 16.717784°N 81.611514°E
- Country: India
- State: Andhra Pradesh
- District: West Godavari
- Mandal: Attili

Population (2011)
  - Total: 4,116

Languages
  - Official: Telugu
- Time zone: UTC+5:30 (IST)
- PIN: 534 134
- Telephone code: 08819

Ballipadu is a village in Attili mandal, West Godavari district in the state of Andhra Pradesh in India.

== Demographics ==
As of 2011 India census, Ballipadu has a population of 4116 of which 2091 are males while 2025 are females. The average sex ratio of Ballipadu village is 968. The child population is 384, which makes up 9.33% of the total population of the village, with sex ratio 1010, significantly higher than state average. In 2011, the literacy rate of Ballipadu village was 73.29% when compared to 67.02% of Andhra Pradesh.

== Administration ==
As per Panchayati Raj Act, Ballipadu is governed by sarpanch or village head.

== See also ==
- West Godavari district
