= Rangaraya Medical College =

College in Kakinada, India

Coordinates: 16°58′44.92″N 82°14′14.28″E

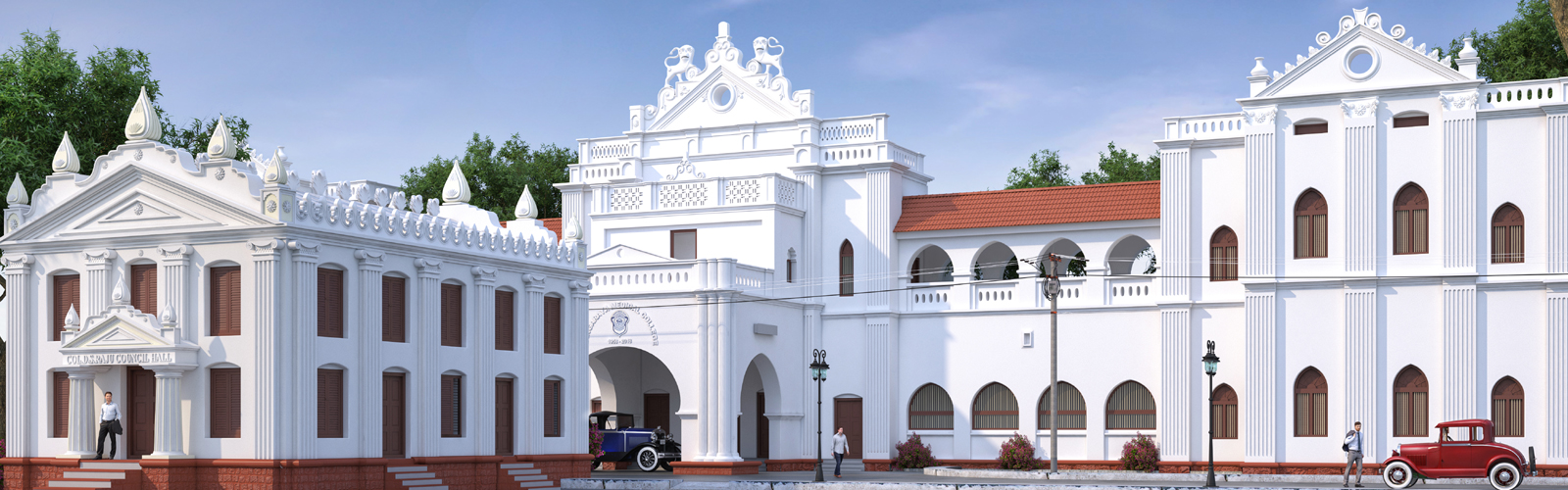
- Type: Government Institution
- Established: 1958; 68 years ago
- Affiliations: Dr. NTR University of Health Sciences, NMC
- Principal: Dr. P. Ushakiran
- Undergraduates: 250 per year
- Location: Pithapuram Road, Kakinada, Andhra Pradesh, India
- Campus: Urban
- Nickname: Royal Rangarayan

Rangaraya Medical College is a public medical college in Andhra Pradesh. It was established in 1958 and is in Kakinada, Andhra Pradesh, India. It is affiliated to Dr. NTR University of Health Sciences.

== History ==
Rangaraya Medical College was started as a private medical college in 1958. It was the result of dedicated efforts by Dr. Mallavarapu Venkata Krishna Rao, who was the then Minister of Education in the cabinet of Sri Chakravarti Rajagopalachari in the composite Madras state. He was later joined by Col. (Dr.) D. S. Raju, MRCP, who was a personal physician of Sri Netaji Subhas Chandra Bose and later Deputy Minister of Defence and Health in the cabinet of Jawaharlal Nehru. Though their efforts started in 1955 the college became a reality on 2 April 1958 in a meeting in Kakinada attended by Sri Neelam Sanjiva Reddy, the then Chief Minister of Andhra Pradesh in the house of Dr Lakkaraju Subbarao where the Maharajah of Pithapuram gave consent to start the Medical College in an orphanage building being run by him on pithapuram road Kakinada.

As a first step a Society called 'Kakinada Medical Education Society' was registered on 16 April 1958 to oversee the starting of the Medical College by july 1958 with the core aims of providing medical education, Medical research and Medical service.

Dr. Datla Satyanarayana Raju and Dr. Mallavarapu Venkata Krishna Rao founded and registered the Medical Education Society on 16 April 1958. Sri P.S.Raju garu, Zamindar of Goteru, donated huge amount of money and helped in establishing this medical college. He was one of the founders of this college in Kakinada.

Mullapudi Harishchandra Prasad of Sri Mullapudi Venkata Rayudu Memorial Educational Trust of Tanuku offered a donation of ₹5 lakh. The college was named after his late brother-in-law Sri. Pendyala Ranga Rao, zamindar of Dommeru. He became the vice president of the society. Sri Kotamarthi Venkanna offered 6.5 acres of land at a very low cost, now called Kotamarthi Park on which stands the present men's hostels. Sri Draksharama Choultry Trust gave a donation of ₹50,000 towards construction of a lecture hall.

Rao Venkata Kumara Mahipati Surya Rau, the Maharaja of Pithapuram, leased the palatial orphanage buildings (now the Main Campus) to house the Medical College. Two lecture halls and a dissection hall were constructed.

The Rangaraya Medical College was inaugurated on 17 November 1958 by Sri. Neelam Sanjeeva Reddy, then Chief Minister of Andhra Pradesh. One hundred students were admitted in the first year. Their teaching work for first MBBS was initiated on 15 August 1958 by Dr. V. S. Krishna, vice chancellor of Andhra University.

Sri Draksharama Choultry Trust represented by the Pydah family gave a donation of ₹50,000 with which a lecture hall was constructed. Many other people contributed smaller donations amounting to about ₹2.5 lakhs.

The Government General Hospital would serve as the teaching hospital. The formal inauguration of the Rangaraya Medical College was done on 17 November 1958 by Sri. N. Sanjeeva Reddy, the then chief minister of Andhra Pradesh.

In the year 1977 the Government of Andhra Pradesh took over the privately managed RMC. In 1981 Rangaraya Medical College became a full-fledged Government Medical College.

More recently the college and hospital have seen numerous changes. Two exam halls capable of accommodating almost 400 people were constructed in 2002. A new lecture gallery for the Department of physiology was constructed behind the exam halls.

The volleyball and basketball court were renovated with flood lights. New tennis courts were constructed and are being used to provide tennis coaching by the East Godavari District Tennis Association. The badminton court flooring was renovated.

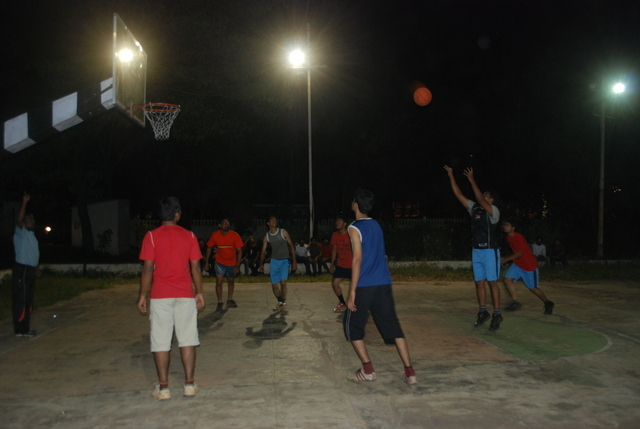
Students playing in the renovated basketball court.

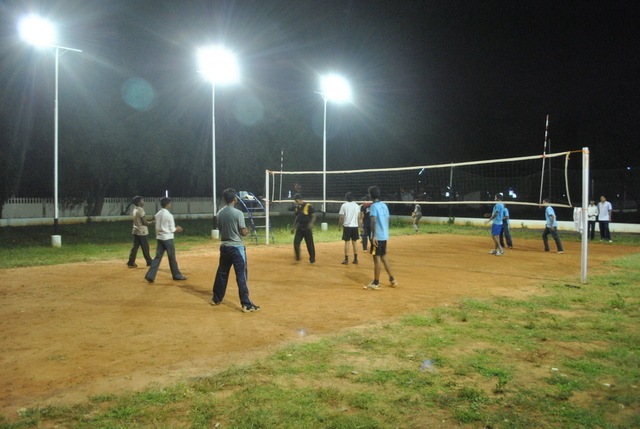
students playing in the renovated volleyball court

During the Golden Jubilee celebrations of the college the auditorium was renovated with air-conditioning and new sound system facilities — making it one-of-a-kind among the auditoriums of its sister colleges in the state. A medical exhibition was organised by students and staff after almost 25 years which attracted huge crowds from the beginning to the end of the event. During the golden jubilee celebrations the RMCANA (Rangaraya Medical College Alumni Association of North America) helped construct a new digital library with internet facilities and free access to world-renowned medical journals.

Sports and cultural festivals were conducted involving colleges around the state, the most recent one being "NEXUS" conducted in 2010.

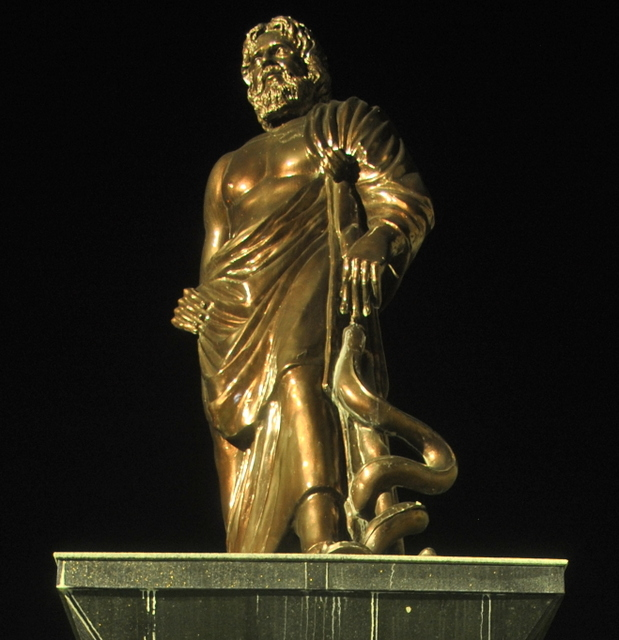
The statue of Hippocrates at the entrance of the college is symbolic of the dedication towards the art and science of medicine shown by everyone who passes through it.

A statue of Hippocrates (the father of medicine) was erected near the entrance of college which gives a new identity to the college on the map of Kakinada. More recently a clock tower was constructed in front of the auditorium.

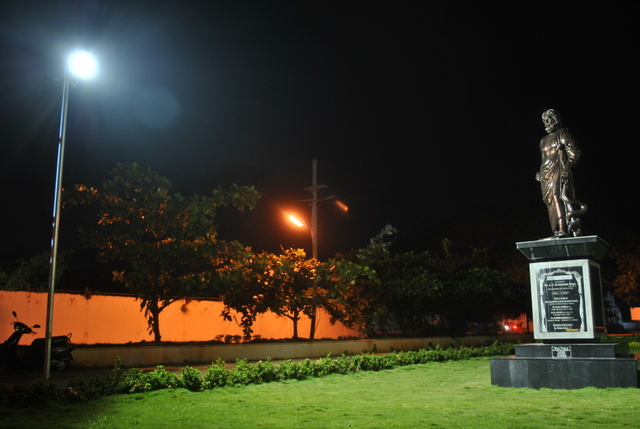
Hippocrates statue at night

The Government General Hospital that serves as the teaching hospital has seen considerable change. A new casualty block was constructed to manage the increasing flow of patients. Several superspecialty departments are being created and their offices are being constructed in the renovated 2nd floor of the main OP building.

A new hostel for internees was constructed as superspecialty departments were being housed in the old internees hostel at the OP Building. New blocks for Antenatal wards and Pre-op gynecology wards were constructed adjacent to the existing Obstetrics, Gynecology and Pediatrics departments. New buildings were constructed to house the ENT, Ophthalmology and Psychiatry departments and their respective Operation Theaters. An ART (Anti Retroviral Therapy) center which caters to the special needs of patients affected with the HIV virus was moved to a new building. It is one of the largest of its kind in India based on the patient volume served giving it a vital role in affecting the epidemiology of HIV in India.

Neonatology course was added by NMC in 2012 making it the first medical college in Andhra Pradesh and eighth in the India to provide D.M. Neonatology.

== Academics ==
The courses offered in the college are:

- M.B.B.S.
- M.D.
- M.S.
- D.M. Neonatology
- M.Ch [neuro surgery, plastic surgery]

== Departments ==
Here is the list of departments in the college and Hospital campuses combined.

- Anaesthesiology
- Anatomy
- Physiology
- Biochemistry
- Pathology
- Pharmacology
- Microbiology
- Forensic Medicine
- Oto-Rhino-Laryngology
- Ophthalmology
- Social and Preventive Medicine
- General Medicine
- Cardiology
- Neurology
- Dermatology and Venereal Diseases
- General Surgery
- Neurosurgery
- Pediatric Surgery
- Orthopedics
- Obstetrics and Gynecology
- Pediatrics
- Neonatology
- Psychiatry
- Radio-diagnosis
- Plastic Surgery
- Pulmonary medicine

== Emblem ==
The emblem of Rangaraya medical College is similar to some extent to the emblem of Andhra University. It consists of two snakes surrounding a lake with a lotus flower and two lotus buds on either sides of the flower during sunrise. This denotes the peace and calm which prevail when a physician cures a patient. Above the sunrise is an inscription in Sanskrit in Devanagari script and below is the same inscription in Telugu script: "Sarve Santu Niramaya" meaning "Freedom from Death and Illness." (This inscription is also the motto of the Indian Army Medical Corps.)
