= Attili =

- Village
- Interactive map of Attili
- Location in Andhra Pradesh, India Attili (India)
- Coordinates: 16.6883°N 81.60594°E
- Country: India
- State: Andhra Pradesh
- District: West Godavari
- Talukas: Attili
- Elevation: 11 m (36 ft)

Population (2011)
  - Total: 25,004

Languages
  - Official: Telugu
- Time zone: UTC+5:30 (IST)
- PIN: 534134
- Vehicle registration: AP

Attili is a village in West Godavari district of the Indian state of Andhra Pradesh. It falls within Tanuku Constituency in Tadepalligudem revenue division. Attili has a train station. Attili is the headquarters of Attili mandal.

== Demographics ==
As of 2011 Census of India, Attili had a population of 25,004. The total population constitutes 1250 group of 0–6 years, with a sex ratio of 928. The average literacy rate stands at 78.82%.
