= Aravalli, West Godavari =

Aravalli
- village
- Interactive map of Aravalli
- Location of Artili mandal in Andhra Pradesh, India Aravalli (India)
- Coordinates: 16.631622°N 81.605463°E
- Country: India
- State: Andhra Pradesh
- District: West Godavari
- Mandal: Attili

Population (2011)
  - Total: 4,777

Languages
  - Official: Telugu
- Time zone: UTC+5:30 (IST)
- PIN: 534 230
- Telephone code: 08819

Aravalli is a village in West Godavari district in the state of Andhra Pradesh in India.

== Demographics ==
As of 2011 India census, Aravalli has a population of 4777 of which 2377 are males while 2400 are females. The average sex ratio of Aravalli village is 1010. The child population is 410, which makes up 8.58% of the total population of the village, with sex ratio 1030, significantly higher than state average. In 2011, the literacy rate of Aravalli village was 86.76% when compared to 67.02% of Andhra Pradesh.

West Godavari district of Andhra Pradesh is home to Aravalli, a village largely driven by fish farming and agriculture. Each January, the community celebrates Vemana Jayanthi and Sankranti. These annual festivals draw village people returning from work or business abroad along with the family. Many people from other areas come and participate in activities such as cockfighting. The village is accessible by both road and rail.

== See also ==
- West Godavari district
