= Tanuku Assembly constituency =

Constituency of the Andhra Pradesh Legislative Assembly, India

Coordinates: 16.76°N 81.68°E

Tanuku
- Constituency No. 61 for the Andhra Pradesh Legislative Assembly
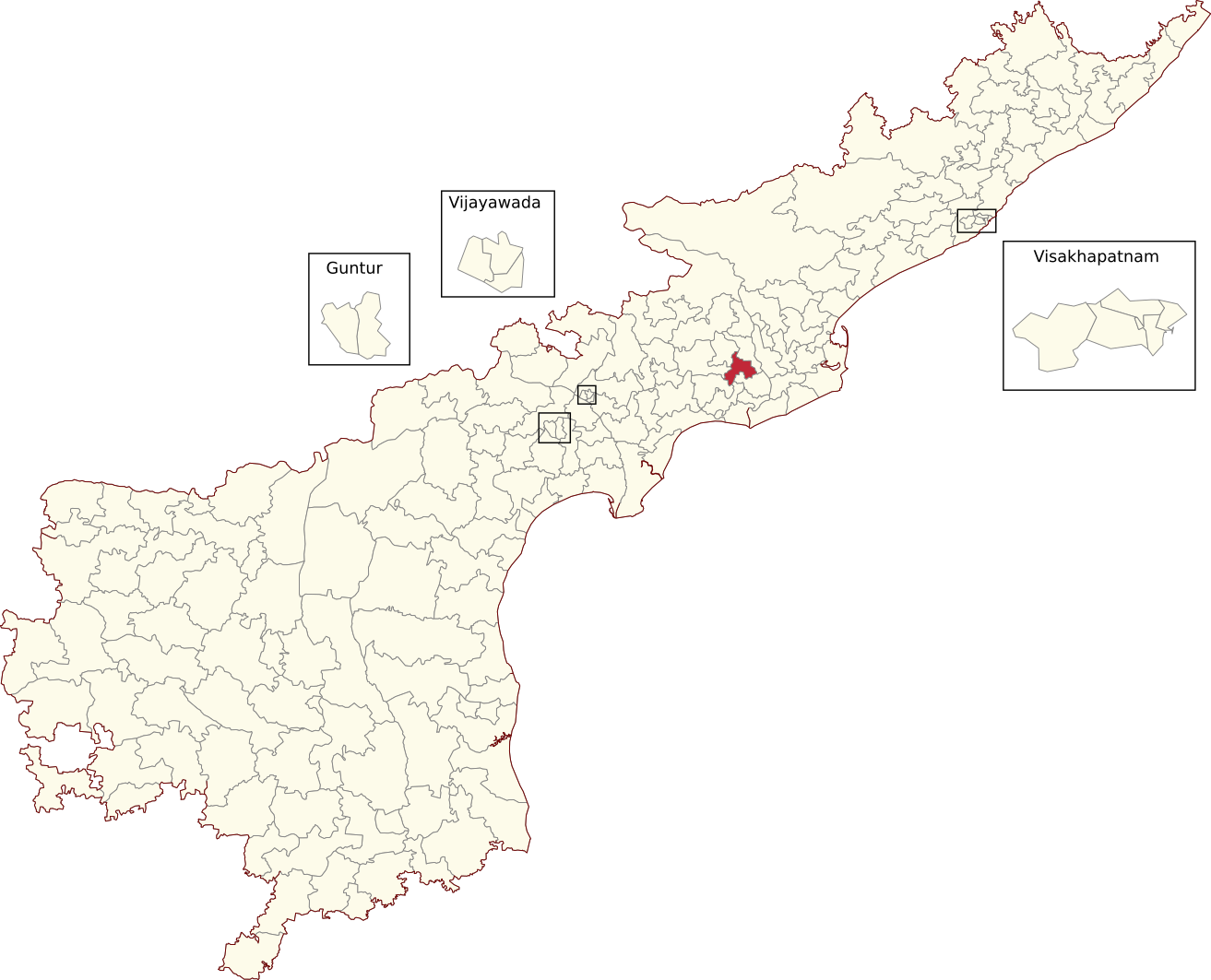
- Location of Tanuku Assembly constituency within Andhra Pradesh

Constituency details
- Country: India
- Region: South India
- State: Andhra Pradesh
- District: West Godavari
- Lok Sabha constituency: Narasapuram
- Established: 1951
- Total electors: 232,126
- Reservation: None

Member of Legislative Assembly
- 16th Andhra Pradesh Legislative Assembly
- Incumbent Arimilli Radha Krishna
- Party: TDP
- Alliance: NDA
- Elected year: 2024

Tanuku Assembly constituency is a constituency in West Godavari district of Andhra Pradesh that elects representatives to the Andhra Pradesh Legislative Assembly in India. It is one of the seven assembly segments of Narasapuram Lok Sabha constituency.

Arimilli Radha Krishna is the current MLA of the constituency, having won the 2024 Andhra Pradesh Legislative Assembly election from Telugu Desam Party. As of 2019, there are a total of 232,126 electors in the constituency. The constituency was established in 1951, as per the Delimitation Orders (1951).

== Mandals ==
Tanuku Assembly constituency consists of three mandals.

Mandal
Tanuku
Attili
Iragavaram

== Members of the Legislative Assembly ==
Year	Member	Political party
1952	Chitturi Indrayya	Kisan Mazdoor Praja Party
1955	Mullapudi Harishchandra Prasad	Indian National Congress
1962	Mullapudi Harishchandra Prasad	Indian National Congress
1967	G. Satyanarayana	Independent
1978	Kantipudi Appa Rao	Indian National Congress (I)
1983	Chitturi Venkareswara Rao	Telugu Desam Party
1985	Mullapudi venkata krishna rao	Telugu Desam Party
1989	Mullapudi venkata krishna rao	Telugu Desam Party
1994	Mullapudi venkata krishna rao	Telugu Desam Party
1999	Y. T. Raja	Telugu Desam Party
2004	Chitturi Bapineedu	Indian National Congress
2009	Karumuri Venkata Nageswara Rao	Indian National Congress
2014	Arimilli Radha Krishna	Telugu Desam Party
2019	Karumuri Venkata Nageswara Rao	YSR Congress Party
2024	Arimilli Radha Krishna	Telugu Desam Party

== Election results ==
=== 2024 ===
2024 Andhra Pradesh Legislative Assembly election: Tanuku
Party	Candidate	Votes	%	±%
TDP	Arimilli Radha Krishna	129,547	66.51	
YSRCP	Karumuri Venkata Nageswara Rao	57,426	29.48	
INC	Kadali Rama Rao	2,422	1.24	
NOTA	None Of The Above	1722	0.88	
Majority		72,121	37.02	
Turnout		1,94,768		
TDP hold		Swing		

=== 2019 ===
2019 Andhra Pradesh Legislative Assembly election: Tanuku
Party	Candidate	Votes	%	±%
YSRCP	Karumuri Venkata Nageswara Rao	75,975	40.31	+1.25
TDP	Arimilli Radha Krishna	73,780	39.14	−17.17
JSP	Pasupuleti Venkata Rama Rao	31,961	16.96	+16.96
Majority		2,195	1.16	
Turnout		188,494	81.20	−0.66
YSRCP gain from TDP		Swing		

=== 2014 ===
2014 Andhra Pradesh Legislative Assembly election: Tanuku
Party	Candidate	Votes	%	±%
TDP	Arimilli Radha Krishna	101,015	56.31	+24.5
YSRCP	Cheerla Radha Krishna	70,067	39.06	+39.06
Majority		30,948	17.25	
Turnout		179,400	81.87	−0.68
TDP gain from INC		Swing		

=== 2009 ===
2009 Andhra Pradesh Legislative Assembly election: Tanuku
Party	Candidate	Votes	%	±%
INC	Karumuri Venkata Nageswara Rao	53,211	32.34	−18.22
TDP	Y T Raja	51,760	31.81	−14.91
PRP	Akula Sreeramulu	47,798	29.37	
Majority		1,451	0.53	
Turnout		162,732	82.55	+2.88
INC hold		Swing		

=== 2004 ===
2004 Andhra Pradesh Legislative Assembly election: Tanuku
Party	Candidate	Votes	%	±%
INC	Chitturi Bapineedu	65,189	50.92	+11.71
TDP	Y T Raja	59,812	46.72	−12.50
Majority		5,377	4.20	
Turnout		128,018	79.37	+4.56
INC gain from TDP		Swing		

=== 1952 ===
1952 Madras State Legislative Assembly election: Tanuku
Party	Candidate	Votes	%	±%
KMPP	Chitturi Indrayya	20,835	42.24%	
INC	Chitturi Subba Rao	14,399	29.20%	29.20%
CPI	Kotipalli Appanna	12,428	25.20%	
Independent	Kalpatraju Kondayya	892	1.81%	
Socialist Party (India)	Y. Narasimha Rao	766	1.55%	
Margin of victory		6,436	13.05%	
Turnout		49,320	78.84%	
Registered electors		62,557		
KMPP win (new seat)				

== See also ==
- List of constituencies of the Andhra Pradesh Legislative Assembly
