= Mullapudi Harishchandra Prasad =

Indian politician and industrialist

Mullapudi Harischandra Prasad
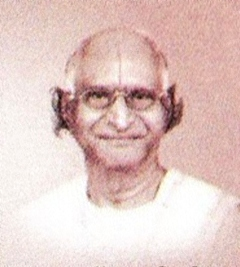

Member of Legislative Assembly Andhra Pradesh
- In office 1956 - 1967
- Preceded by: Andhra Pradesh Assembly Created
- Succeeded by: G. Satyanarayana
- Constituency: Tanuku

Member of Legislative Assembly Andhra State
- In office 1955 - 1956
- Preceded by: Chitturi Indrayya
- Succeeded by: Andhra Pradesh Assembly Created
- Constituency: Tanuku

Personal details
- Born: 28 July 1921 Tanuku, Andhra Pradesh
- Died: 3 September 2011 (aged 90) Hyderabad, Andhra Pradesh
- Party: Telugu Desam Party
- Occupation: Industrialist, politician
- Known for: Founder of Andhra Sugars

Mullapudi Harischandra Prasad (28 July 1921 – 3 September 2011) was an Indian politician and industrialist from Andhra Pradesh. He was the chairman and managing director of the Andhra Sugars Group and also the managing director of Andhra Petrochemicals and the President of the Federation of Andhra Pradesh Chambers of Commerce and Industry (FAPCCI). He started Andhra Sugars in 1947 – one of the first industries set up in Independent India and hence called "Andhra Birla". He established the first aspirin factory in India and created a rocket fuel unit that supplied to Indian Space Research Organisation.

He was originally from the town of Tanuku in Andhra Pradesh, born to Mullapudi Thimmaraju and Venkataramanamma, from a Kamma Zamindar family.

Prasad was elected twice as a member of the Andhra Pradesh Legislative Assembly representing the Indian National Congress. Later when the Telugu Desam Party was formed he is known to have played a key role in the party.

Prasad set up educational and medical trusts. He played an important role in establishing Rangaraya Medical College, Kakinada, Andhra Pradesh and SMVM Polytechnic, Tanuku, Andhra Pradesh. He also established Mullapudi Venkata Ramanamma Memorial Hospital and Research Centre in Tanuku, Andhra Pradesh.

== Professional career ==
- Chairman and managing director, Andhra Sugars Limited
- Executive Director, Andhra Petrochemicals Limited, Visakhapatnam
- managing director, Andhra Chemicals Corporation
- Director, Elecon Engineering Co. Ltd. Vallabh Vidyanagar
- Director, Andhra Foundry & Machine Tools Ltd.
- Chairman, Jayalakshmi Oil and Chemical Industries Limited (Jocil Ltd.)
- Chairman and managing director, Sree Satyanarayana Spinning Mills Ltd, Tanuku
- Jayalakshmi Fertilizers
- Chairman, Sree Akkamamba Textiles Ltd.

== Political career ==
- Secretary in the AP Congress Committee from 1946 to 1955
- Member of state Legislative Council in Common Madras in 1952
- Elected MLA from Tanuku twice in 1955 and 1961
- First chairman of the Tanuku municipality in 1981

== Awards and honours ==
- Honorary Doctorate by Nagarjuna University
- U.B. Raghavendra Rao Memorial Award
- President, Federation of Andhra Pradesh Chambers of Commerce and Industry (FAPCCI)
- Lifetime Achievement Award at Z24 hours Telugu news channel's Industrial Awards
- Telugu Thalli award from Government of Andhra Pradesh
