= Directorate of Medical Education =

State agency of Andhra Pradesh, India

Directorate of Medical Education is an administrative body of Andhra Pradesh State, India. It overlooks the medical education in Andhra Pradesh through medical colleges. It is located at Hanumanpet, Vijayawada.

It is headed by director of medical education who oversees the functioning of principals of medical and nursing colleges, superintendents of general and speciality hospitals and chief accounts officers. He is assisted by additional director, joint directors and assistant directors and chief information officer.

There are 23 medical colleges and dental colleges and paramedical centers functions under the directorate.
