= Krishna Institute of Medical Sciences (hospital group) =

Indian hospital chain

- Type: Public
- Traded as: NSE: KIMS; BSE: 543308
- Industry: Healthcare
- Founded: 2000
- Headquarters: 1-8-31/1, Minister Rd., Krishna Nagar Colony, Begumpet - 500003, Secunderabad, India
- Number of locations: 30 Hospitals (2026)
- Area served: India, South Asia
- Key people: Dr. Bhaskar Rao Bollineni (Founder, Chairman and MD); Dr. Abhinay Bollineni (Executive Director and CEO)
- Revenue: ▲₹3,067 crore (US$330 million) (2025)
- Operating income: ▲₹815 crore (US$87 million) (2025)
- Net income: ▲₹415 crore (US$44 million) (2025)
- Website: www.kimshospitals.com
- Footnotes; Financials as of 31 March 2025.

The Krishna Institute of Medical Sciences (KIMS Group of Hospitals) is an Indian multi-speciality hospital chain. It was founded by Dr. Bhaskar Rao Bollineni in 2000 in the city of Nellore. Currently, the KIMS Group of Hospitals operates 30 hospitals across the states of Telangana, Andhra Pradesh, Maharashtra, Kerala, and Karnataka. The KIMS Group of Hospitals is certified by NABH and NABL. It is listed on BSE and the NSE.

== History ==
Krishna Institute of Medical Sciences (KIMS Group of Hospitals) is an Indian multi-speciality hospital chain that operates a network of hospitals across several states in southern and western India. The hospital group was founded in 2000 by cardiothoracic surgeon Dr. Bhaskar Rao Bollineni, who opened the first hospital in Nellore, Andhra Pradesh with approximately 200 beds. The group has subsequently expanded its network to include multiple hospitals under the KIMS Hospitals brand with a combined capacity of over 8,600 beds.

In 2002, the group established another hospital in Rajahmundry, Andhra Pradesh, and in 2004, it opened its flagship facility in Secunderabad, Telangana, which has grown to a capacity of approximately 1,000 beds and serves as the headquarters of the hospital chain. The group expanded further throughout the 2000s and 2010s, adding hospitals in various cities including Srikakulam, Kondapur, Ongole, Visakhapatnam, Anantapur, and Kurnool.

KIMS Hospitals received the Association of Healthcare Providers India (AHPI) Award in the Patient-Friendly Hospital category in 2017. In 2021, Krishna Institute of Medical Sciences launched its initial public offering (IPO) and became a publicly listed company on the National Stock Exchange of India (NSE) and the Bombay Stock Exchange (BSE).

Throughout the 2020s, the group continued expanding its geographic footprint, adding new hospitals in states such as Maharashtra, Kerala, and Karnataka, including facilities in Nagpur, Nashik, Kannur, Kollam, Sangli, Thane, and Bengaluru.

== Branches ==
As of 2026, Krishna Institute of Medical Sciences operates a network of multi-specialty hospitals across five Indian states: Telangana, Andhra Pradesh, Maharashtra, Kerala and Karnataka, with a combined bed capacity exceeding 8,600 beds.

Notable hospitals in the network include:

- KIMS Hospitals, Secunderabad – Flagship hospital and corporate headquarters.
- KIMS Hospitals, Nellore – The group’s first hospital, established in 2000.
- KIMS Hospitals, Rajahmundry – One of the early expansion hospitals.
- KIMS Hospitals, Kondapur, Gachibowli, Kompally, Begumpet (KIMS-Sunshine), Paradise Circle (Asian Transcare & MIPPL), and HITECH City (KIMS-Arete) – Major urban facilities in Hyderabad, Telangana.
- KIMS-ICON Hospital & KIMS Hospitals, Visakhapatnam – Two multi-specialty units serving the north coastal Andhra region.
- KIMS Hospitals, Srikakulam, Ongole, Kurnool, Kakinada and Guntur (2 units) – Regional hospitals across Andhra Pradesh.
- KIMS-Saveera Hospital in Anantapur is the largest healthcare facility in the Rayalaseema region. The group also opened an emergency clinic in Anantapur in 2019.
- KIMS Hospitals, Nagpur, Nashik (2 units), Sangli and Thane – Facilities in Maharashtra.
- KIMS Hospitals, Kannur, Kollam, Palakkad, and Thrissur – Hospitals in Kerala.
- KIMS Hospitals, Bengaluru – two Multi-specialty hospitals marking the group’s entry into Karnataka.

The group has also announced plans for future expansion, including proposed super-specialty hospitals in other major Indian cities, as part of its long-term growth strategy.

== Services ==
Krishna Institute of Medical Sciences (KIMS Group) offers a comprehensive range of healthcare services through its network of hospitals, providing integrated, multi-disciplinary care with a focus on tertiary and quaternary healthcare delivery.

The group provides medical and surgical services across more than 25 specialties and super-specialties, including cardiac sciences, oncology, neurosciences, gastroenterology, orthopaedics, organ transplantation, renal sciences, and mother and child care.

KIMS also delivers care in other domains such as pediatric cardiac services, perioperative care for gastrointestinal and liver transplants, and general pediatrics, among others, through dedicated specialty teams at its hospitals.

Across its network, the group emphasizes the use of advanced medical technology and multidisciplinary clinical protocols to support complex procedures, critical care, emergency care and chronic disease management.

=== Organ transplantation ===
KIMS Hospital has infrastructure to support organ transplantation and has created an organ donation swap registry. In 2019, KIMS Secunderabad recorded 1,000 kidney transplant surgeries. In a first of its kind procedure in India, KIMS Hospitals Lung Transplant Doctors successfully performed a double lung transplant surgery on a COVID-19 patient.

The KIMS Heart and Lung Transplant team has performed 12 Covid Double Lung transplants and overall 50 Lung and Heart transplant procedures between September 2020 and April 2021.

This is by far the highest number of procedures performed at a single healthcare institute in Asia in the past eight months as far as COVID Double Lung Transplants are concerned.

=== Robotic surgeries ===
KIMS Group of Hospitals are one of the first few hospitals in India to focus on robotic surgeries and they set up South India's first robotic facility. In 2011, they performed the first robot-assisted colorectal surgery in India. The hospital performs robotic surgeries for oncology, gynaecology, urology and gastroenterology.

=== Programs ===
In 2017, the cardiology department held the 13th annual Cardiology Update programme. In 2019, the orthopaedic department held a course on knee replacement for orthopaedic surgeons across Andhra Pradesh and Telangana. The hospital also conducted a Lupus Awareness Ramp Walk and Deep Vein Thrombosis Awareness Walk in 2019. In 2019, they also held a conference on bone marrow transplant in paediatrics.

== Awards and accreditations ==
Award	Year	Category
NABH Accreditation	2011	Hospital Quality and Patient Safety Standards
NABL Accreditation	2015	Laboratory Quality Standards
ISO 9001:2015 Certification	2015	Quality Management Systems
Indo-Global Healthcare Summit & Expo Award	2015	Best Multi-Speciality Hospital
AHPI Award	2017	Patient-Friendly Hospital
National Quality Excellence Award	2019	Best Super-Speciality Hospital in Telangana
Times Healthcare Achievers Award	2019–20	Best Hospital in Orthopaedics and Surgical Oncology
The Week Best Hospital Survey	2021	Second Best Multi-Speciality Hospital in Hyderabad
The Week Best Hospital Survey	2022	Second Best Multi-Speciality Hospital in Hyderabad
AACI Accreditation	2023	International Healthcare Standards
The Week Best Hospital Survey	2023	Second Best Multi-Speciality Hospital in Hyderabad
AHPI Award	2023	Excellence in Nursing Practices
AHPI Award	2024	Excellence in Nursing Practices
AHPI Award	2025	Excellence in Hospital Operations (Non-Clinical)
AHPI Award	2026	Excellence in Critical Care Services
Accredited	2026	First Hospital to receive - Advanced Stroke Centre Accreditation

=== Other recognitions ===
- Ranked among the top healthcare providers in national and regional surveys for clinical quality and patient care.

=== Advanced Modern Technology Available at KIMS Hospitals ===
- 4-Arm HD da Vinci Robotic Surgical System: Facilitates complex surgeries that are virtually scarless.
- O-Arm Scanner: Multi-dimensional surgical imaging platform optimized for use in spine, orthopaedic, and trauma-related surgeries.
- Spy Glass: State of the art add on to ERCP that allows doctors to observe patients’ biliary duct system and other tiny ducts in the pancreas.
- Fibroscan: Specialized non-invasive diagnostic ultrasound-based device that measures fibrosis and steatosis caused by different liver diseases.
- Novalis Tx Linear Accelerator: Machine used in radiosurgery and radiotherapy for treating cancer patients.
- 3 Tesla MRI: Non-invasive diagnostic imaging technique performing faster scans and gives improved diagnostic sensitivity and specificity.
- Mako Robotic for Knee Replacement: Produces minimal blood loss and a smaller scar. Helps preserve healthy bone and soft tissue. Results in less post-operative pain than manual techniques.
- Cuvis Ortho Robo: The most advanced surgical equipment capable of 3D pre-planning, virtual surgery and precise cutting to provide accurate and precise surgery results.
- EBUS: Used to diagnose lung cancer, infections, and other diseases causing enlarged lymph nodes in the chest.
- STEALTH STATION S8: Provides the Neuro surgeon to use data intraoperatively for advanced visualization.
- IMPELLA: Impella, the world’s smallest heart pump, is a percutaneous catheter-based technology that provides hemodynamic support to the heart.
- EVIS X1 Endoscopy System: The most advanced Endoscopy system helps improving clinical outcomes by providing Endoscopist with innovative and proven tools.
- MRgFUS: 1st in Telangana and 2nd in India to bring this revolutionary Knifeless Brain procedure for treating essential tremors & Tremor-Dominant Parkinson's patients. Proven to reduce Tremors severity and improve quality of life for Parkinson’s & Essential Tremors Patients.
- ESWL Dornier: It offers powerful imaging, maximized energy, and enhanced efficiency. It allows for better diagnosis, better treatment, and better patient follow-up at no additional radiation risk.
- TULSA PRO: The FIRST & ONLY hospital in India to introduce this groundbreaking technology for prostate cancer and BPH treatments. A non- invasive procedure that uses real-time MRI guidance to precisely deliver thermal ablation for treating BPH (Benign Prostatic Hyperplasia) and prostate cancer, preserving surrounding healthy tissue.
- Gamma Knife Radiosurgery: South India's first hospital to introduce this non-invasive radiation therapy. A non-invasive radiosurgery procedure that uses focused beams of gamma radiation with real-time imaging to precisely treat brain tumors, vascular malformations, and functional brain disorders - without a surgical incision.
- CORI surgical system: The CORI system is generally indicated for patients suffering from degenerative joint diseases, such as osteoarthritis, who have not found relief through conservative treatments.
- MISSO Robotic Knee Replacement: Fully automated robotic arm, Sub-millimetre precision based on CT scan planning, Accurate bone cuts, implant sizing & placement, Faster recovery & reduced post-op pain.
- Mazor X Robotic Guidance System: Robotic spine surgery with the Mazor X Guidance System offers a precise and advanced approach to treating spinal conditions. This technology enables surgeons to plan and perform procedures with high accuracy, improving patient safety and outcomes.
