= Culture of Visakhapatnam =

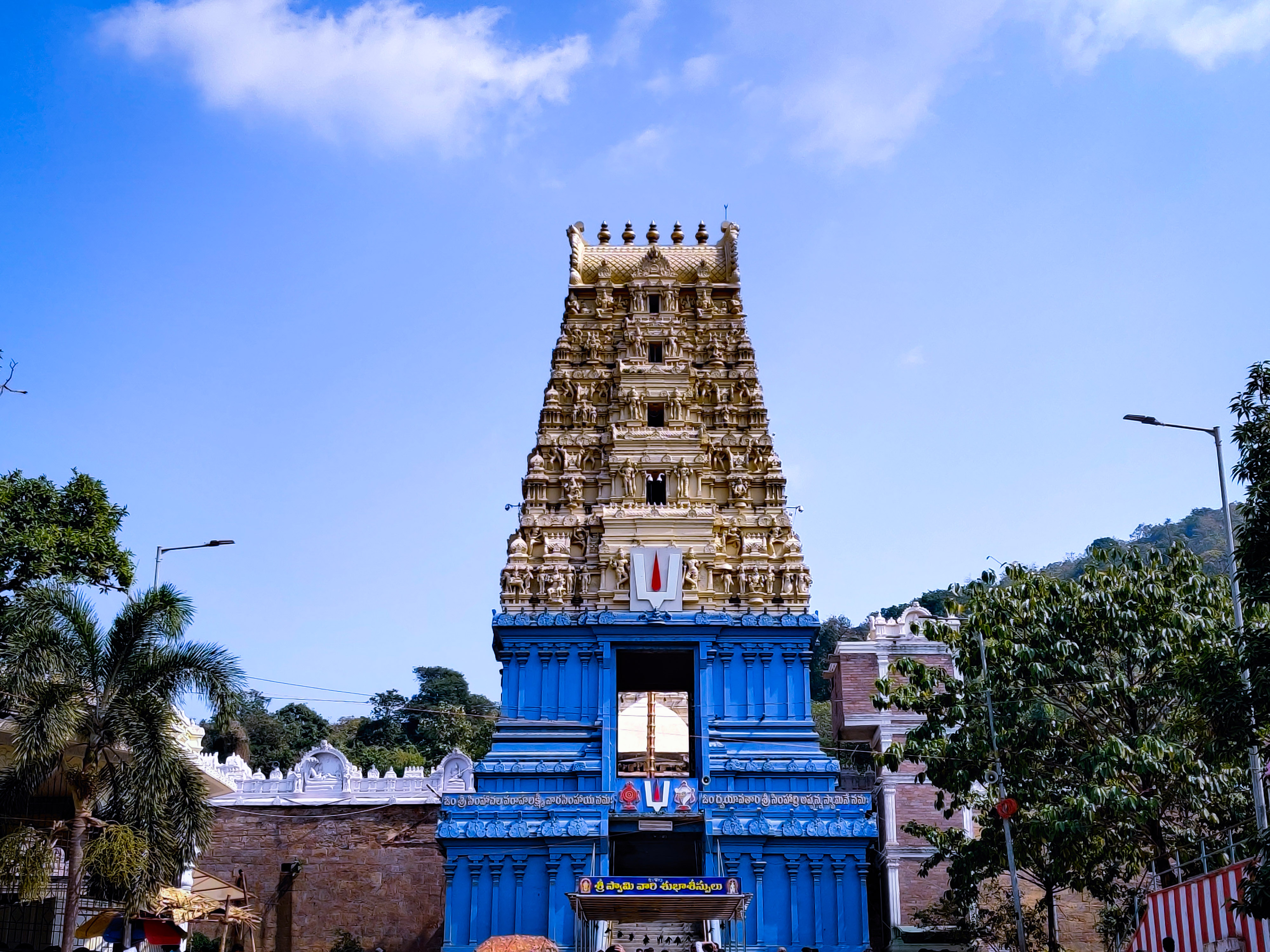
Simhachalam Devasthanam Raja Gopuram

Visakhapatnam, also known as Vizag, is a city and port in the South India state of Andhra Pradesh. Visakhapatnam has long history since 1068 AD..

== Religion ==
Hinduism is the majority religion in this city reaching 93% of residents. Other religions are Islam, Christianity and Buddhism. Religious tolerance is maintained there.

== People ==
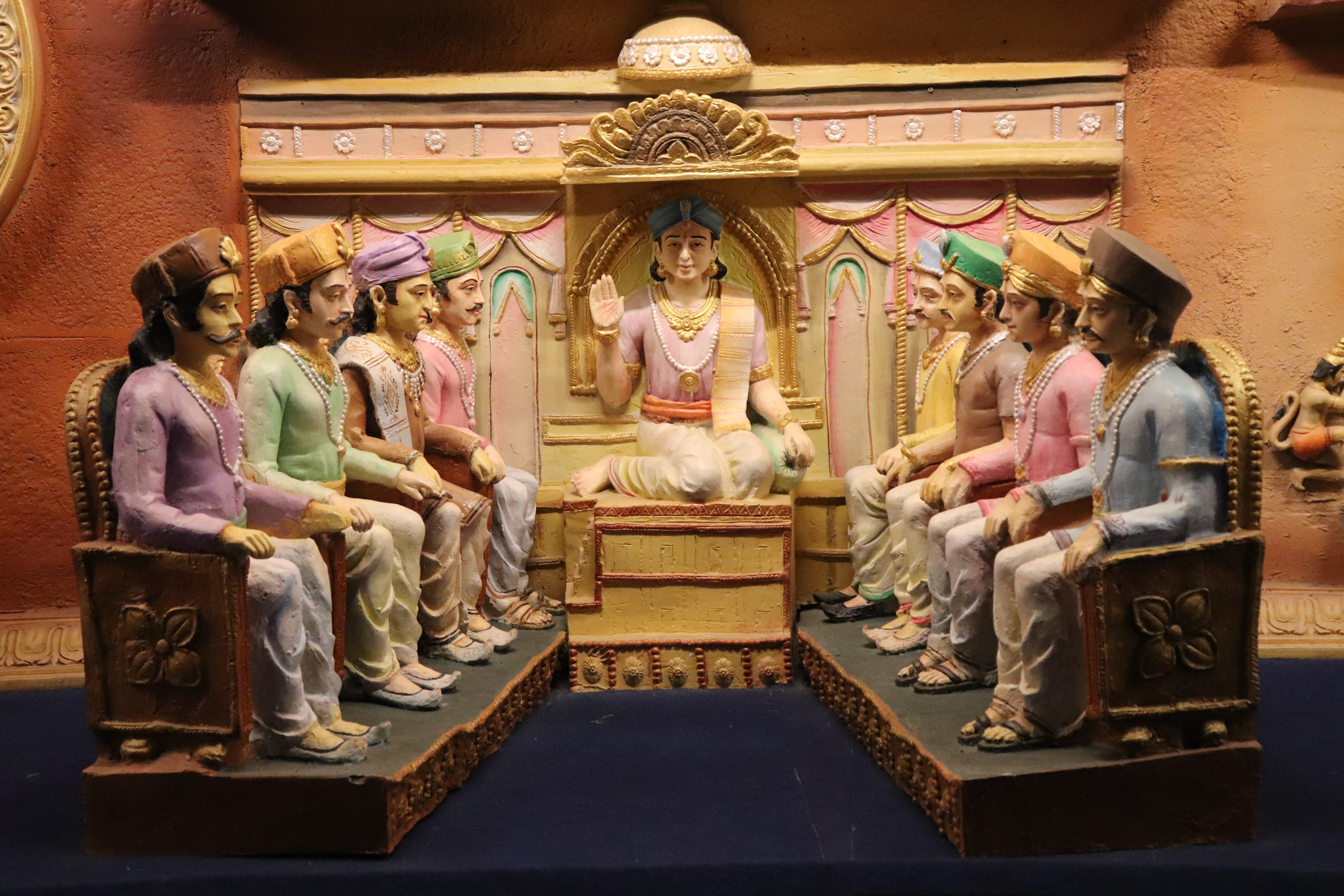
replica at Telugu Samskruthika Niketanam

The majority of people in Visakhapatnam are Telugu. Additionally Odia, Hindi, Tamil and Malayalam people are present. English is spoken widely in Vizag because many Anglo-Indian people reside there.

== Cuisine ==
Typical south Indian cuisine is widespread, especially Muri Mixture, Idly, Dosa, Pesarattu, Kodi pulao and bamboo chicken. Western food such as pizza and burgers are available.

== Festivals ==
Makar Sankranti is a festival that celebrates Ugadi, Vinayaka Chavithi, Deepavali, Dasara.

== Sports ==
Cricket is the most popular game in Vizag. Kabaddi, tennis, badminton, and field hockey are also popular. Sports facilities include Dr. Y. S. Rajasekhara Reddy ACA–VDCA Cricket Stadium, Port Trust Diamond Jubilee Stadium, and Swarna Bharathi Indoor Stadium.

== See also ==
- Telugu Samskruthika Niketanam, museum in Visakhapatnam
