= VIP Road, Visakhapatnam =

Major commercial road in India

Coordinates: 17.726555°N 83.316261°E

VIP Road is a major commercial road in the Indian city of Visakhapatnam. it connects to Siripuram to Resapuvanipalem. There are so many shopping hubs and restaurants are located in VIP Road like Pantaloons Fashion & Retail, Shoppers Stop, Paradise Biryani.
