= List of educational institutions in Visakhapatnam =

This is a list of educational and research institutions in Visakhapatnam, India prior to district restructure in June 2022. For the current list of articles, see category:Education in Visakhapatnam and its subdirectories.

== Universities and Central Institutions ==
- Andhra University
- Indian Institute of Management
- Indian Institute of Petroleum and Energy
- Damodaram Sanjivayya National Law University
- Indian Maritime University
- Kalam Institute of Health Technology
- National Institute of Oceanography, India
- GITAM University

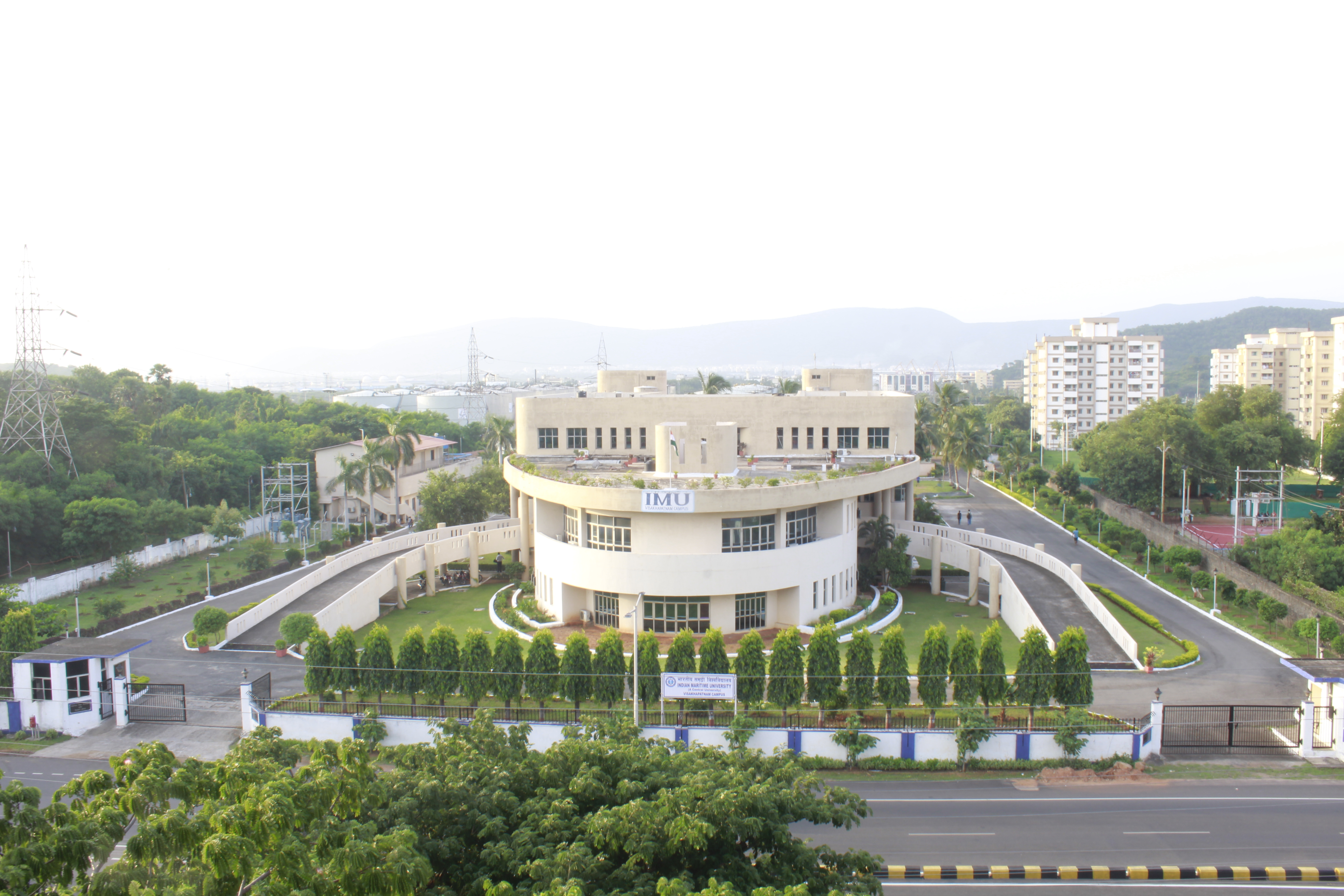
Indian Maritime University

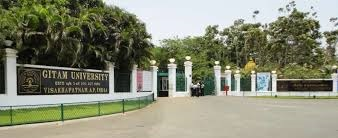
Gitam University

== Medical Colleges ==
- Andhra Medical College
- GITAM Institute of Medical Sciences and Research
- NRI Institute of Medical Sciences
- Gayatri Vidya Parishad Institute of Healthcare & Medical Technology

== Engineering Colleges ==
- Andhra University College of Engineering (Autonomous)
- Andhra University College of Engineering for Women
- Gayatri Vidya Parishad College of Engineering
- Anil Neerukonda Institute of Technology and Sciences
- Vignan's Institute of Information Technology
- Raghu Engineering College
- Visakha Institute of Engineering & Technology
- Avanthi Institute of Engineering & Technology
- Nadimpalli Satyanarayana Raju Institute Of Technology (NSRIT)
- Dr. Lankapalli Bullayya College of Engineering
- N S Raju Institute of Engineering And Technology (NSRIET)
- Sanketika Vidya Parishad Engineering College
- Chaitanya Engineering College
- VITAM Engineering College

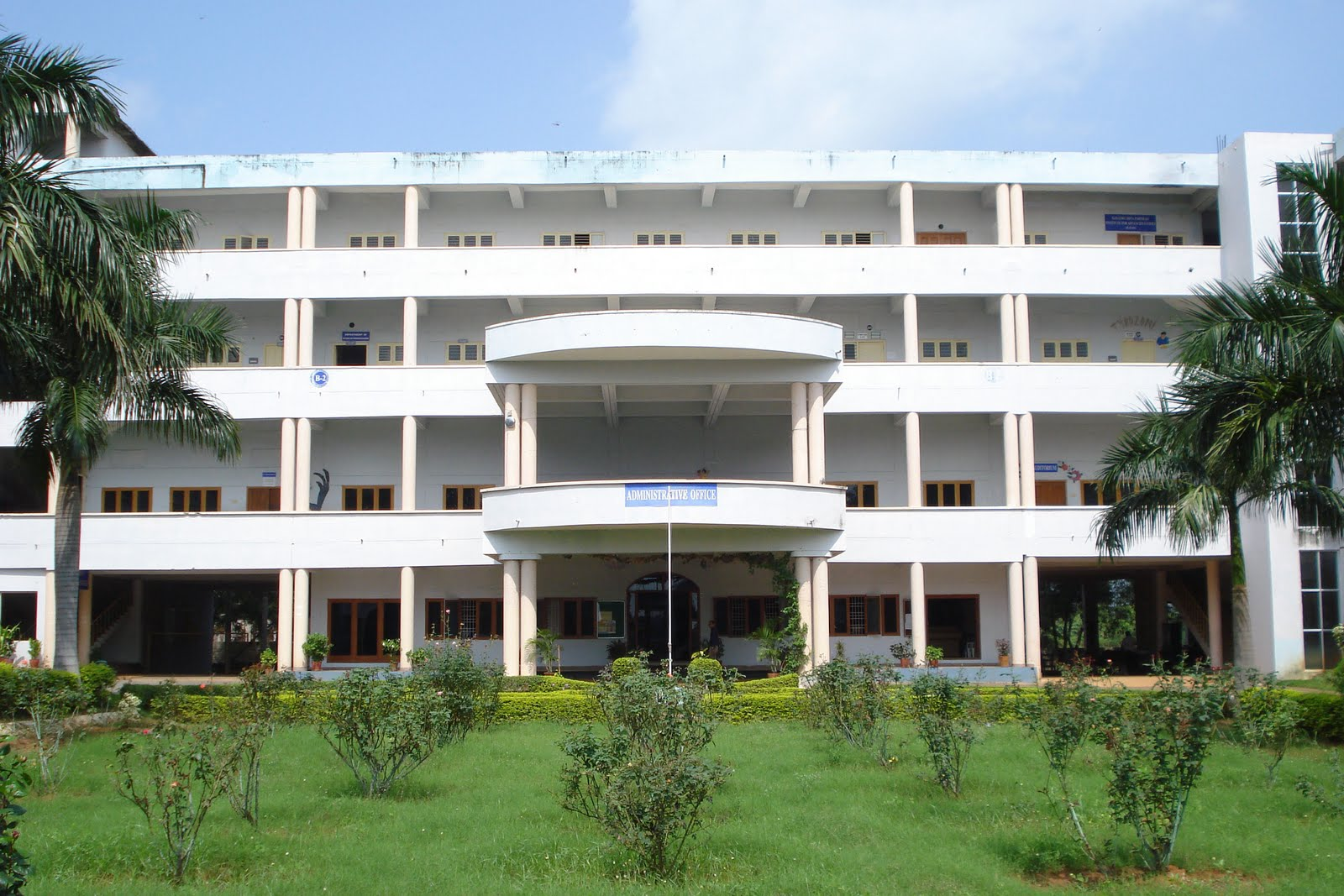
GVP College of Engineering

== Degree Colleges ==
- Mrs. A. V. N. College
- Dr. V. S. Krishna Govt. Degree & P.G College
- Dr. Lankapalli Bullayya College
- Visakha Govt. Degree College For Women
- St.Joseph's College For Women
- Gayatri Vidya Parishad College for Degree and PG Courses
- Aditya Degree College
- PRISM Degree and PG College
- M.V.R Degree College
- TSR and TBK Degree College
- Samata College
- VINEX DEGREE COLLEGE

== Polytechnic Colleges ==
- Government Polytechnic College, Visakhapatnam
- Government Institute of Chemical Engineering, Visakhapatnam
- Government Polytechnic College for Women, Bheemunipatnam
- Government Polytechnic College, Pendurthi
- Government Polytechnic College, Anakapalli
- Mrs. A.V.N Polytechnic College
- Sanketika Polytechnic College
- Sai Ganapathi Polytechnic College
- Alwardas Polytechnic College
- Avanthi Polytechnic College
- Behara Polytechnic College

== Schools ==
- Alwardas Public School
- Ameya World School
- Bethany School
- D.A.V. Public School
- Delhi Public School
- De Paul School
- Greendale International School
- Kendriya Vidyalaya
- Kotak Salesian School
- Pollocks High School
- Little Angels School
- Navy Children School
- Oakridge International School
- S.F.S. High School
- Silver Oaks International School
- Sri Prakash Vidyaniketan
- Sri Sathya Sai Vidya Vihar
- St Aloysius' Anglo-Indian High School
- St. Joseph's Secondary School
- Timpany School
