= Dr. Lankapalli Bullayya College =

College in Resapuvanipalem, Andhra Pradesh, India

- Type: Education
- Established: 1973
- Location: Resapuvanipalem, Visakhapatnam, Andhra Pradesh, India; 17.731809°N 83.312626°E
- Campus: 10 acres (4.0 ha); Urban
- Website: www.bullayyacollege.org

Dr. Lankapalli Bullayya College, also known as Dr. L. Bullayya College, Dr. L.B. College, or simply LBC, is an affiliated college of Andhra University established in 1973. It is named in honor of Dr. Lankapalli Bullayya, who server as a Vice Chancellor Of Andhra University. The college campus is located in Resapuvanipalem, Visakhapatnam, Andhra Pradesh, India. The college is awarded an ‘A’ grade by the NAAC.

== History ==
Academics, bureaucrats and businessmen of Visakhapatnam formed into a not-for-profit education society called "The Society For Collegiate Education" with K. Jayabharat Reddy as President, Prof K.V. Sivayya as Secretary, Dr. M. Gopala Krishna Reddy as Treasurer, and started this college initially as a College of Commerce offering B.Com.

A wide variety of courses were added gradually and currently the College offers both the undergraduate as well as postgraduate courses in the Faculties of Commerce, Management, Arts and Sciences. In addition to these courses, College is also granted the status of Research Centre in some departments by Andhra University allowing students to pursue their M. Phil and Doctoral programmes.

Society for Collegiate Education has also started a Junior College in 1979 and a College of Engineering for Women in 2010.

== Campus Location & Facilities ==
Campus is located in the heart of the city in Resapuvanipalem area behind Swarna Bharathi Indoor Stadium adjacent to Tech-Mahindra campus on the road Which Is Now Called As The "Bullayya College Road" in Visakhapatnam.

Campus is built on a 10-acre plot with several multi-storied buildings to accommodate class rooms, seminar halls, laboratories, offices, canteen and other amenities.

Campus Hosts Several Blocks With Each Block, Dedicated For A Department.Each Block Hosts A Minimum Of 2-3 Floors With Several Rooms In It. The Largest Block Is Block Number 9, Which Is An Undergraduate Block For Science.

Campus Has A Large And Spacious Cricket Ground With 2 More Stadiums, One Being For Basketball And The One Being For Physical Outdoor Sportings.LBC Has A Large And Fully Furnished GYM Which Can Be Used Both, By Girls And Boys At Different Timings. The Classrooms Are Large, Spacious And Open.

Campus Also Has An Indoor Sports Facility For Sports Such As Table Tennis, Etc. Students take part in games & sports at Inter-University, Intra-University, District, State, National and International levels and have consistently secured medals And Bagged Various Trophies For The Institution.

Campus Also Hosts 5 Units Of NCC And 2 Units Of NSS.

== Institutions ==
Common Campus hosts the following institutions:

- Dr. Lankapalli Bullayya Junior College
  - Affiliated to the Board of Intermediate Education, Government of Andhra Pradesh
    - Offers +2 courses (Intermediate) in Sciences and Arts groups (MPC, BiPC, CEC, MEC)
- Dr. Lankapalli Bullayya College
  - Affiliated to Andhra University
    - UG Commerce & Management division: B.Com, B.B.A
    - UG Arts & Science division: B.A., B.Sc
    - PG Arts & Science division: M.A., M.Sc, MHRM
  - Affiliated to Andhra University & approved by AICTE
    - PG Computing & Management division: M.C.A & M.B.A
- Dr. Lankapalli Bullayya College of Engineering (Both Men And Women)
  - Affiliated to Andhra University & approved by AICTE
    - Offers B.E.And BTech in Computer Science Engg, Electronics& Communication Engg, Electrical& Electronics Engg, Civil Engg, Etc
- Study Center of Indira Gandhi National Open University (IGNOU).

== Faculty ==
President:

- Prof'K.C.REDDY

SECRETARY:

- Dr G'MADHUKUMAR

PRINCIPAL

- Dr.G.S.K.CHAKRAVARTY

PHYSICAL DIRECTOR

- Dr.Y.SRINIVAS

LIBRARIAN

- K.SATYANARAYANA REDDY'

PLACEMENT

- Mr.VARA PRASAD.
