= Telugu Samskruthika Niketanam =

Coordinates: 17.751773°N 83.335586°E

Telugu Saamskruthika Niketanam
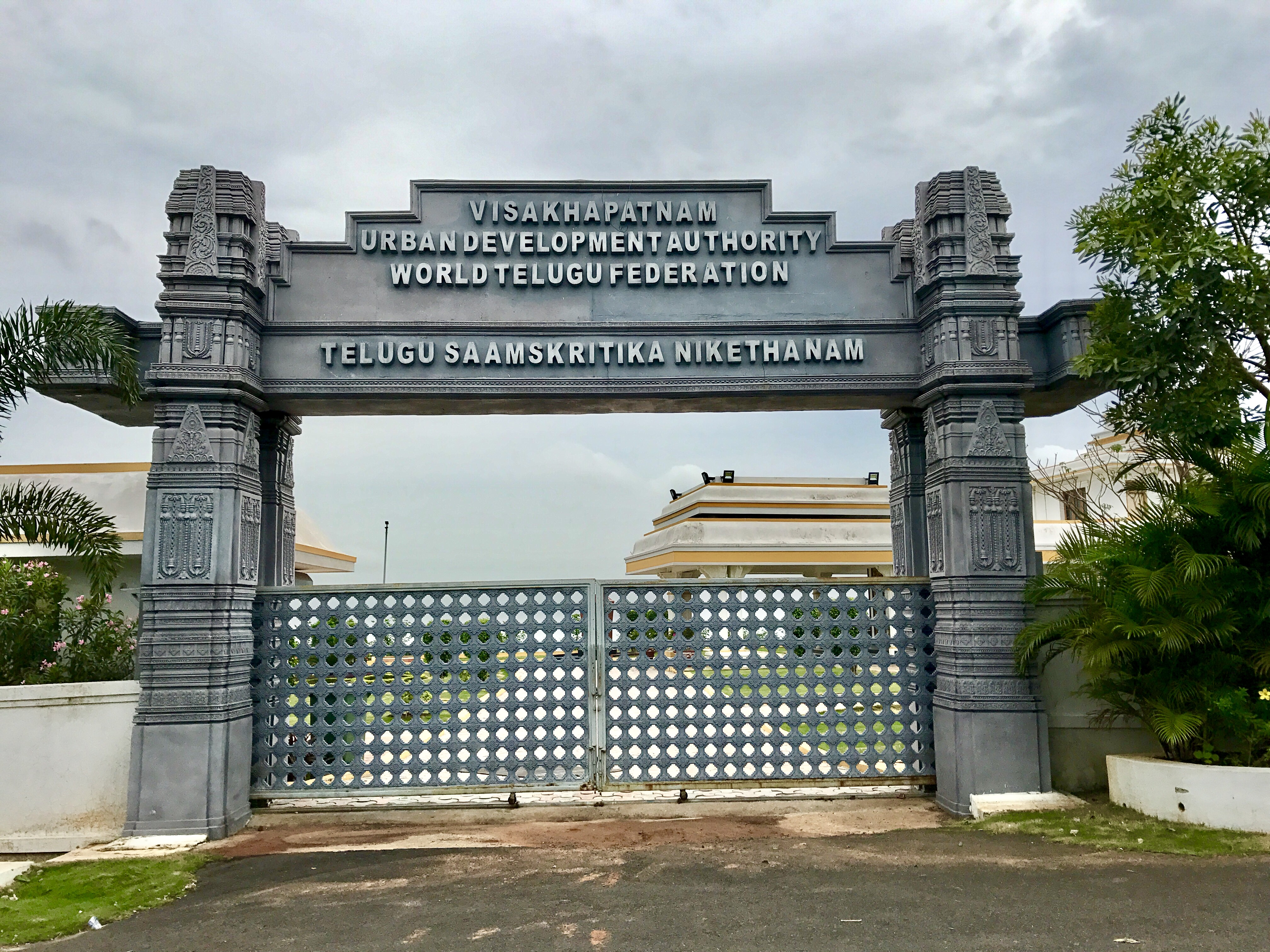
- Established: 19 November 2015
- Location: Kailasagiri, Visakhapatnam
- Type: Heritage center, Cultural centre
- Owners: Visakhapatnam Metropolitan Region Development Authority, Government of Andhra Pradesh

Telugu Saamskruthika Niketanam, also called World Telugu Museum, is located in Visakhapatnam, Andhra Pradesh, India.

== Objectives ==
The museum's main objective is to show Telugu history and culture from the Satavahana dynasty until modern times. It has 42 episodes on the arts, folk arts, great poets, language, literature and history of great personalities in Telugu society.

== Gallery ==
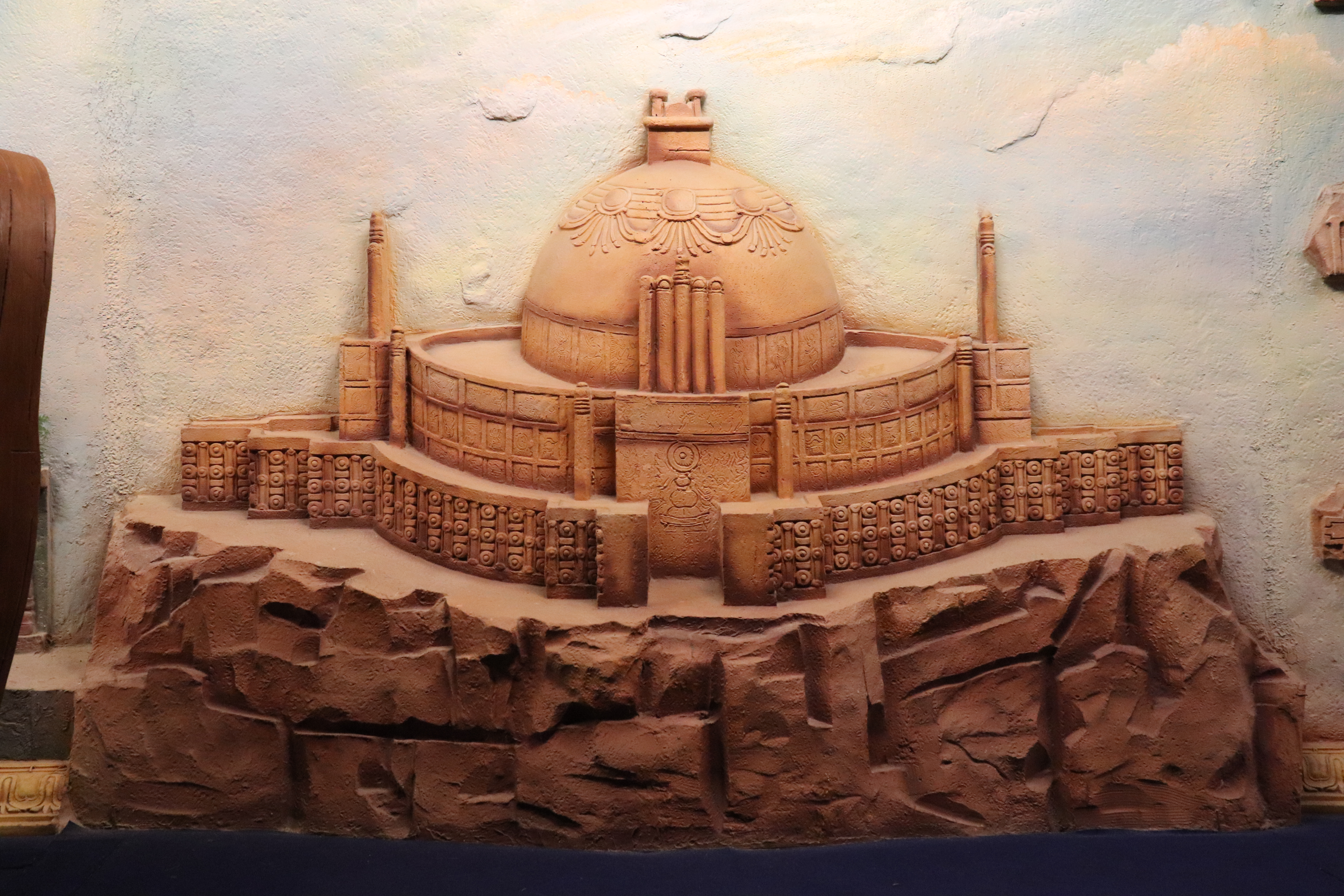
Amaravati stupa model

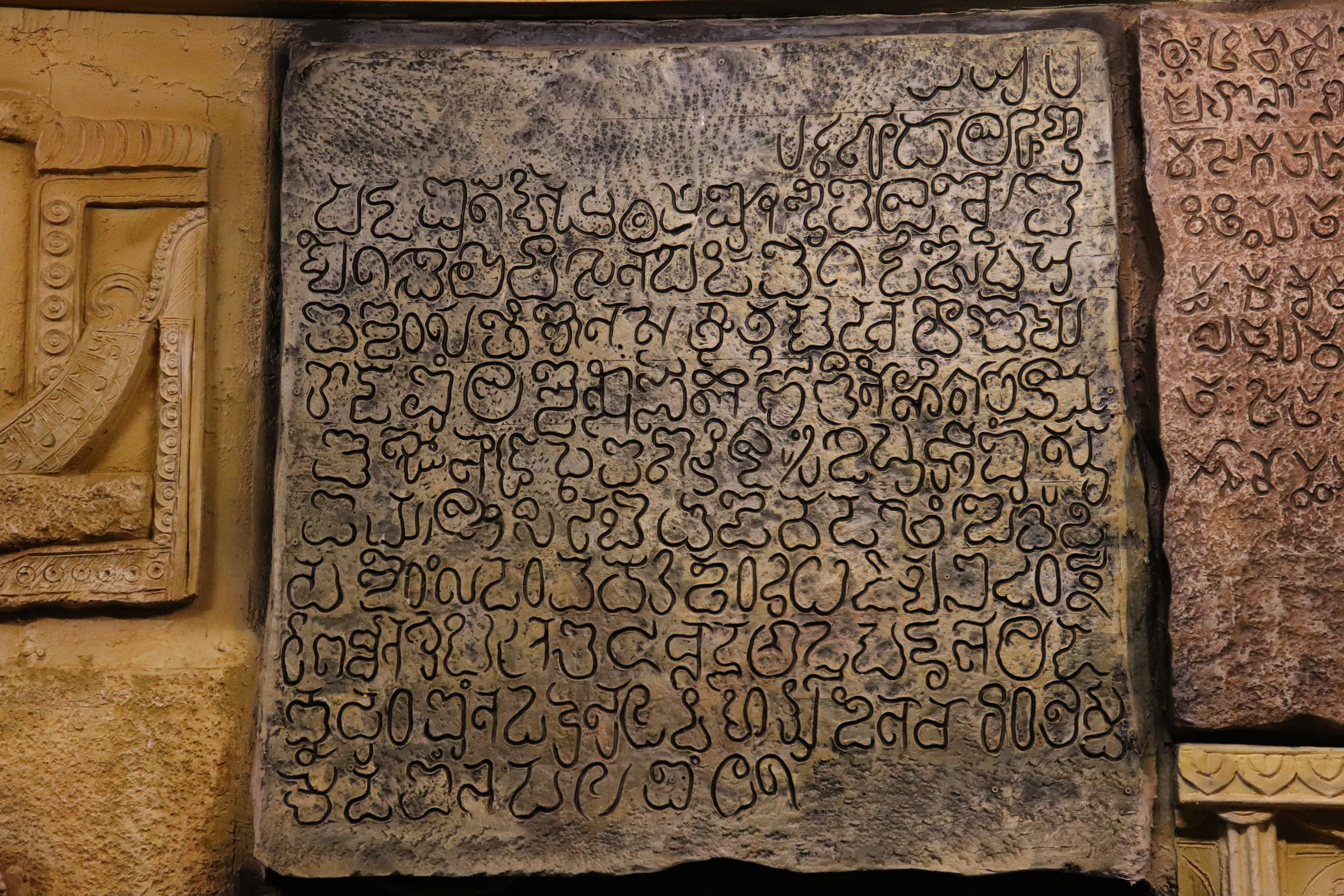
Ancient Telugu Script

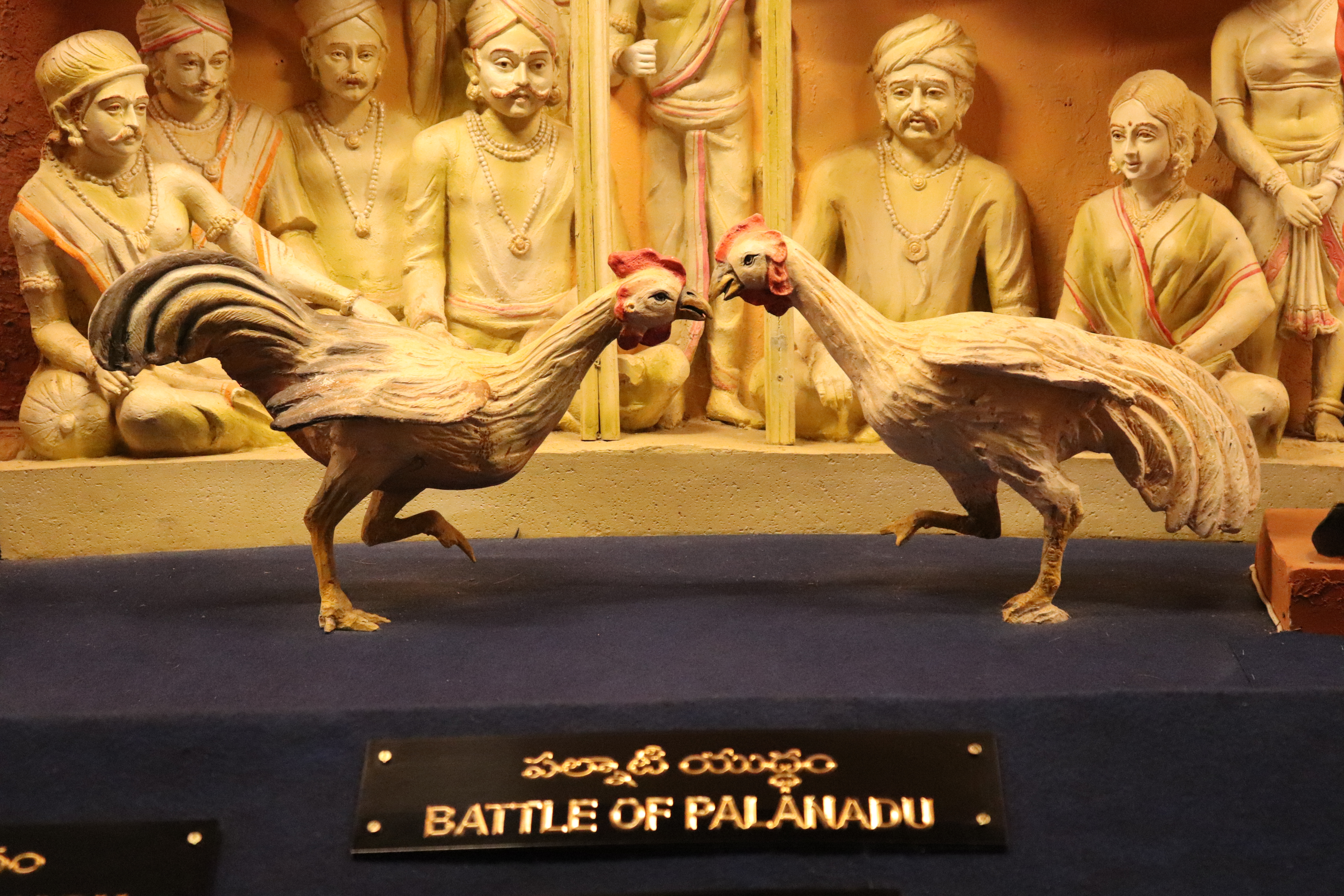
Battle of Palanadu

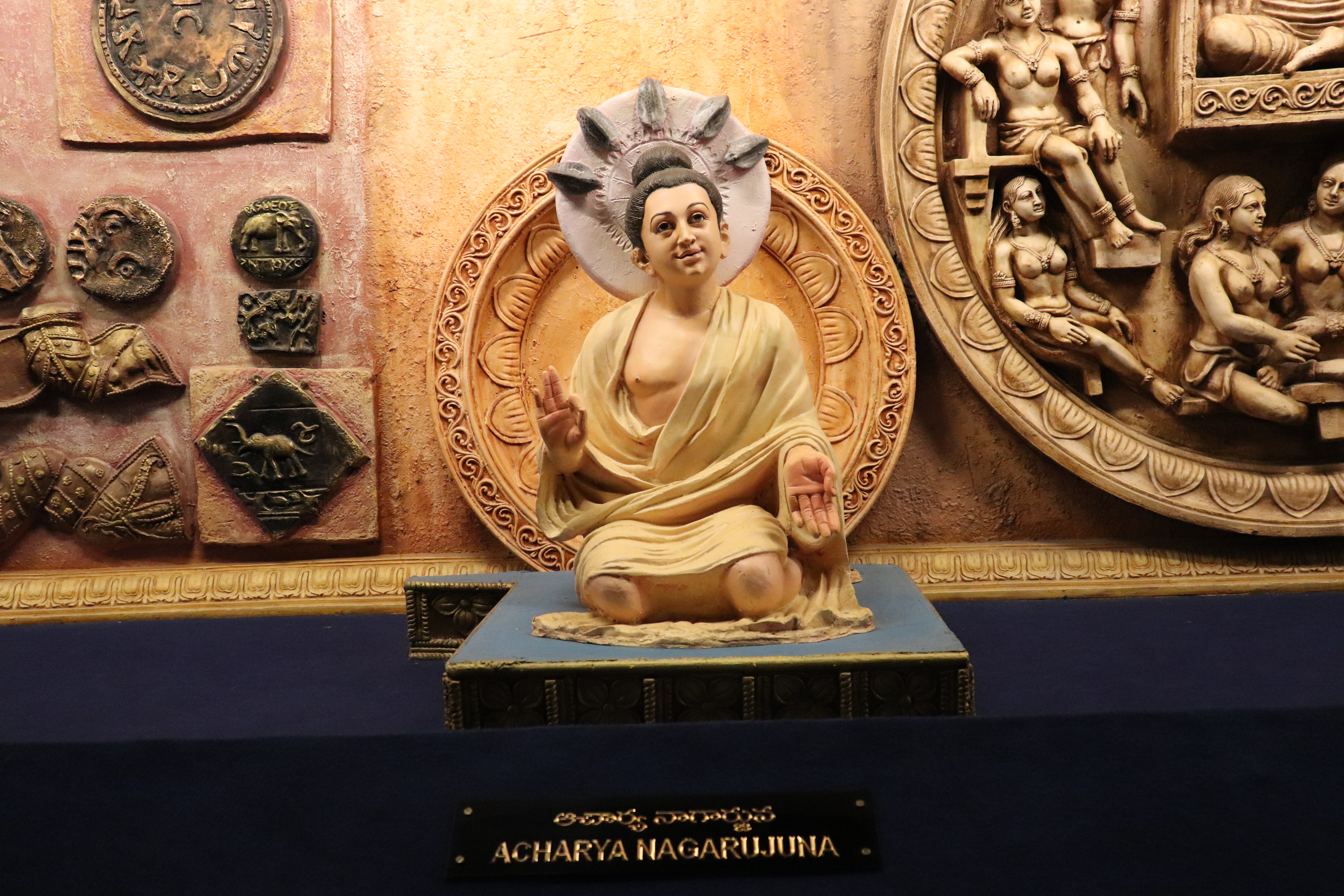
Miniature statue of Acharya Nagarjuna

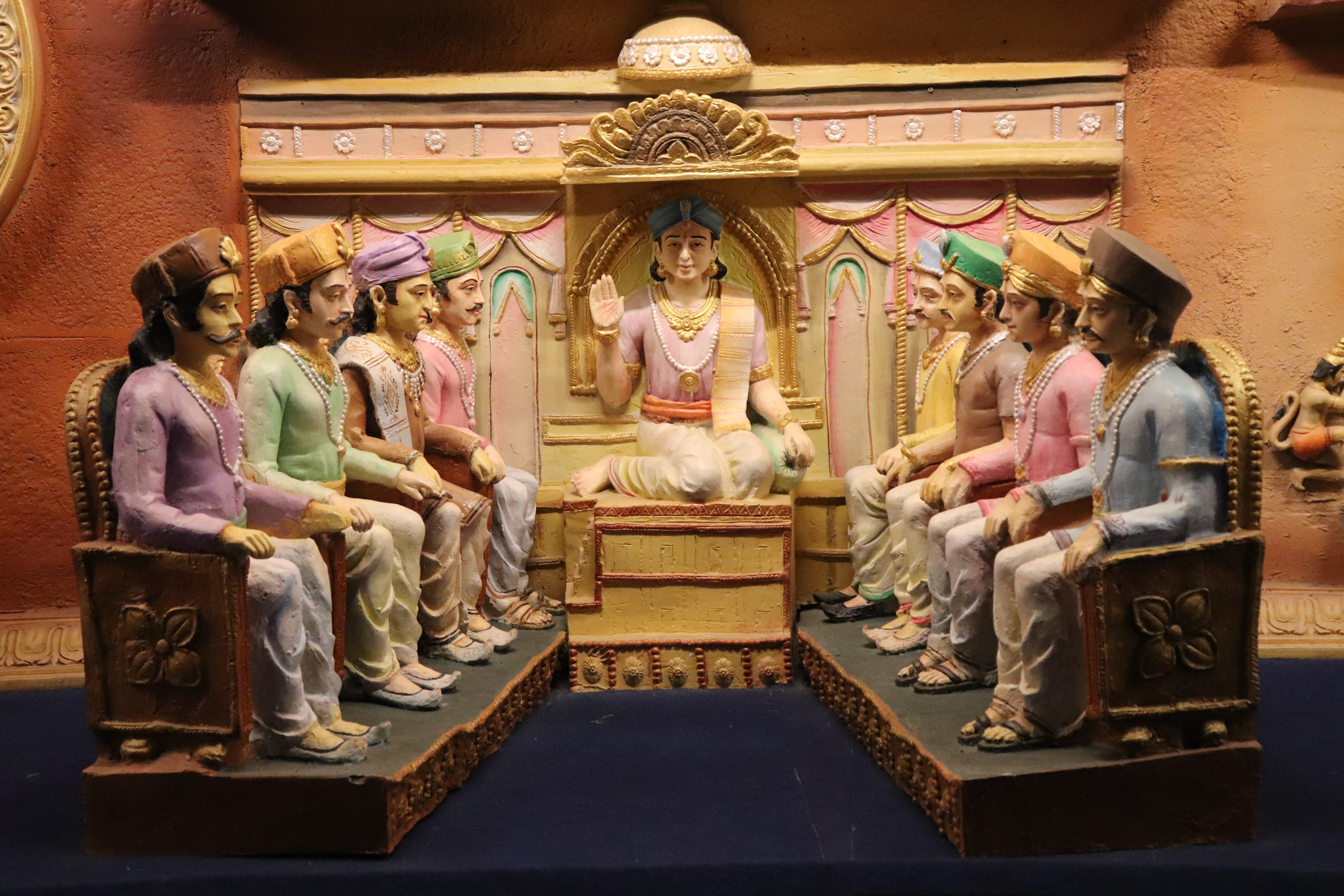
Ashtadiggajas with Sri Krishnadevraya

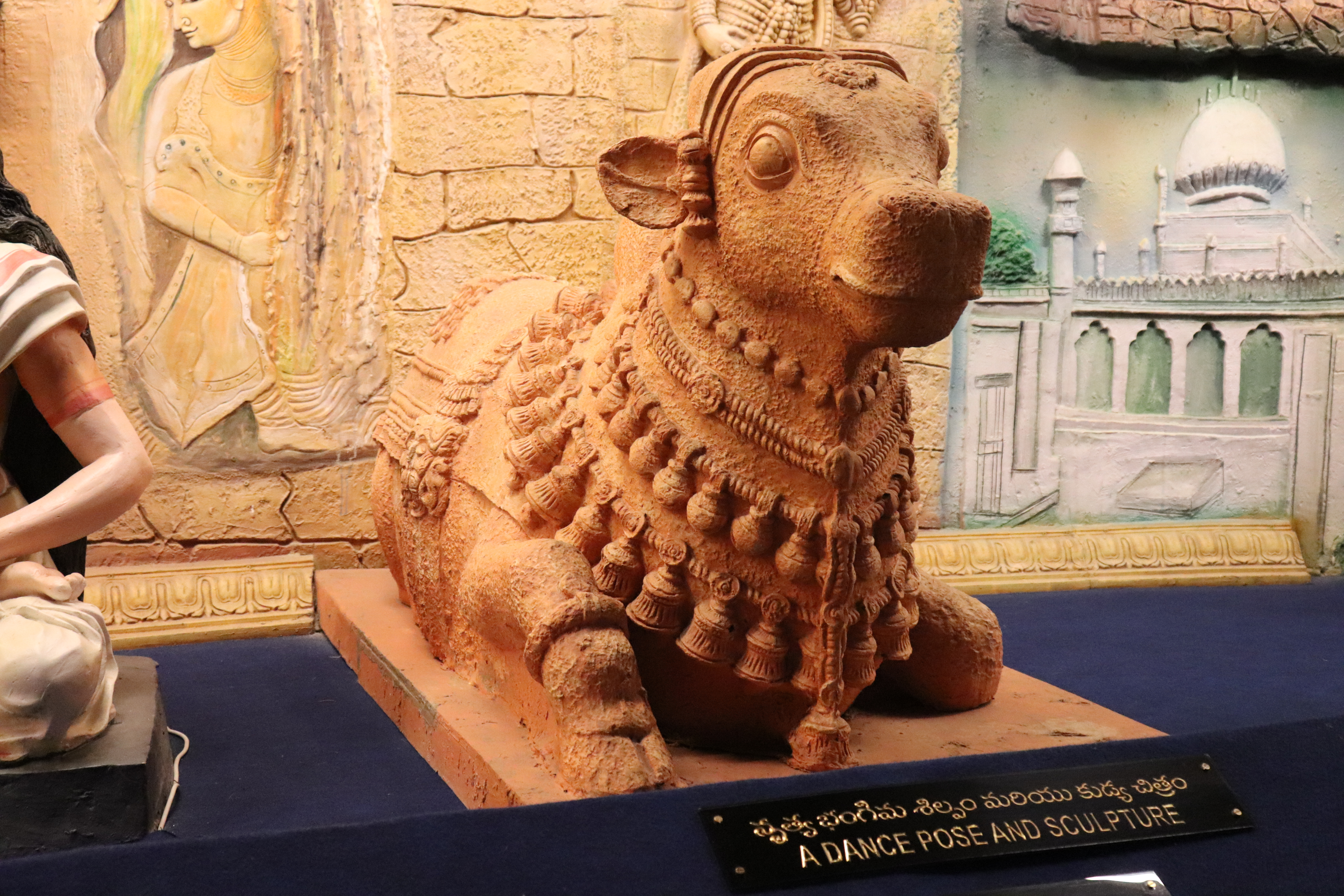
Model of Lepakshi Nandi

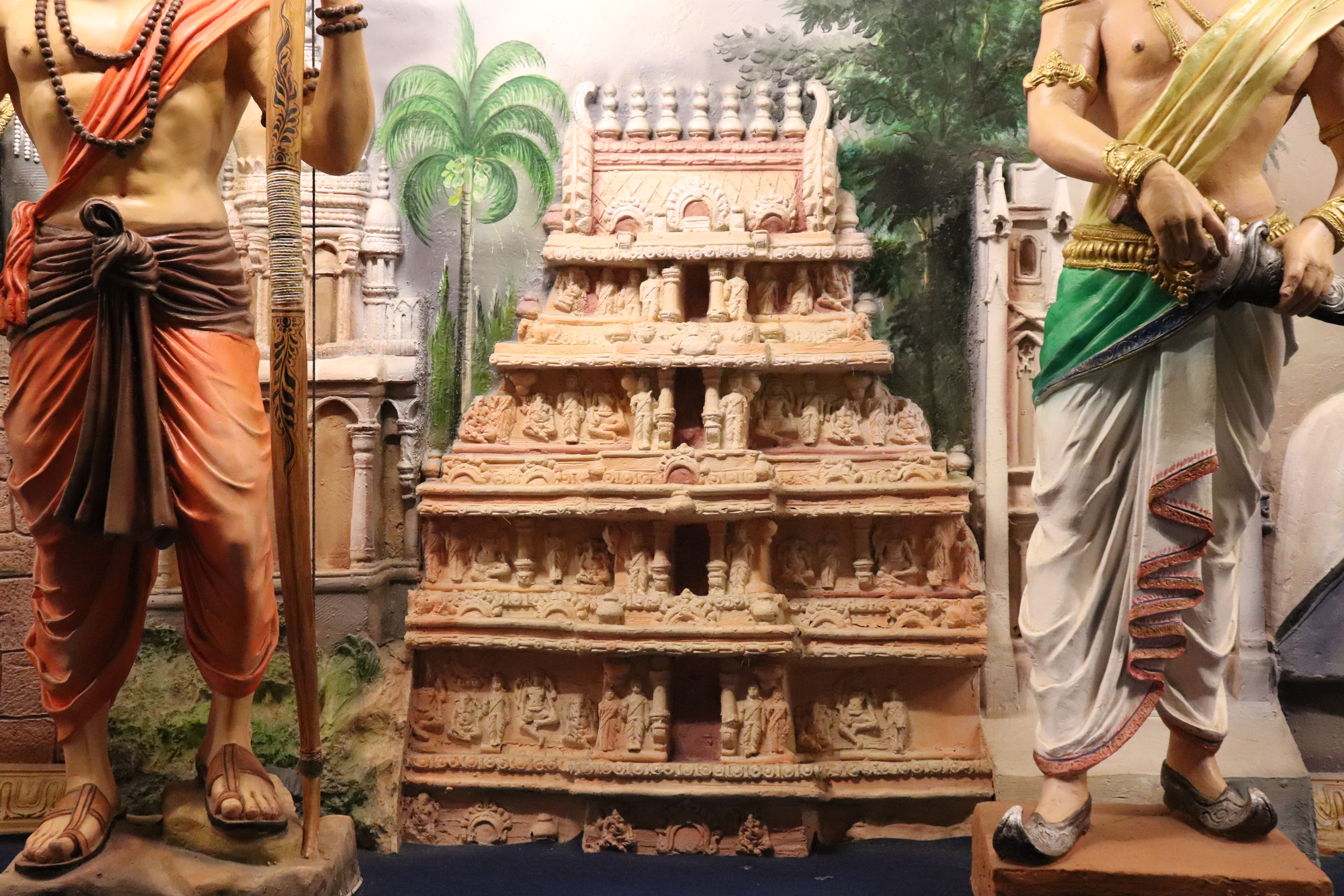
Galigopuram

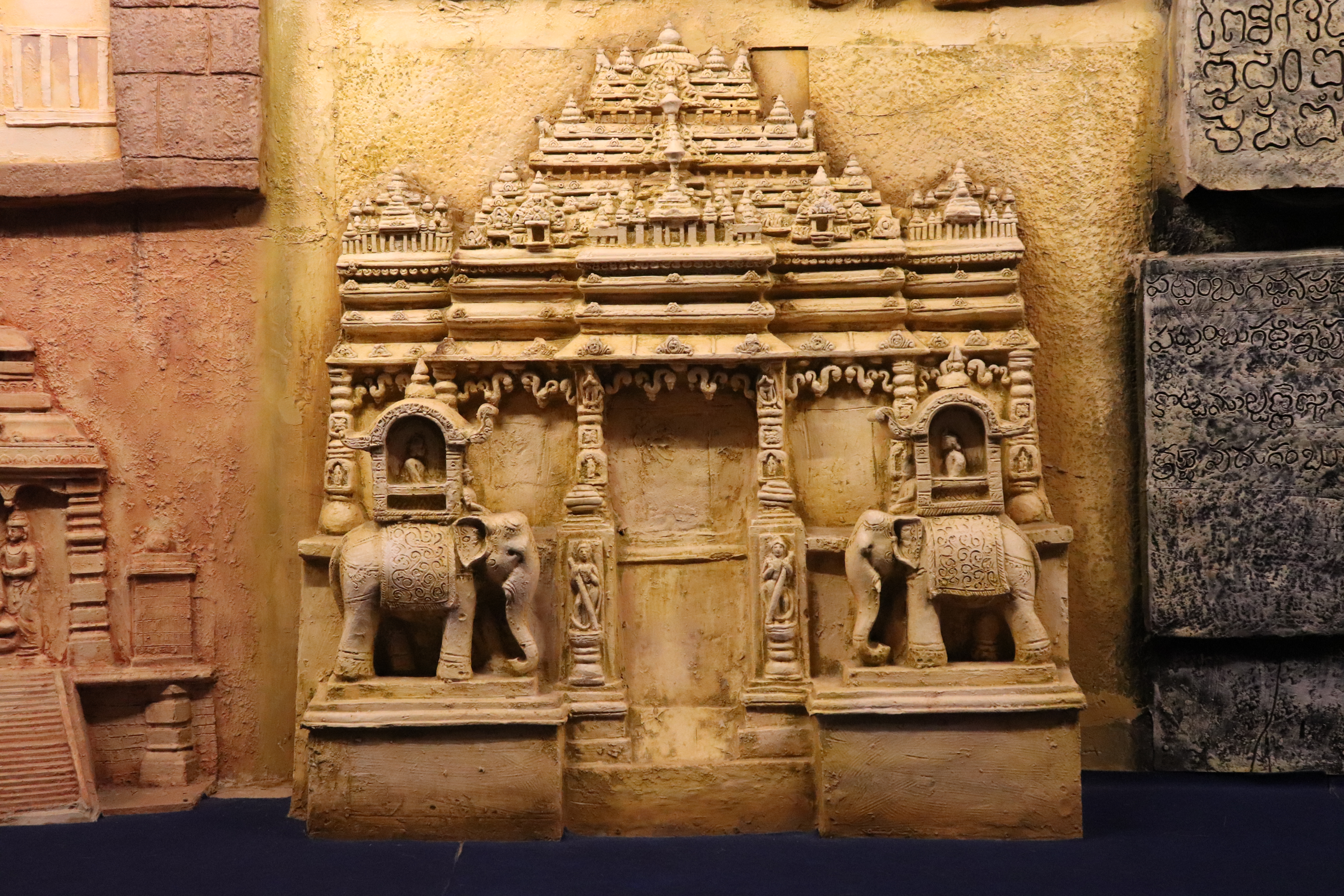
Model showing entrance of Kolanupaka temple

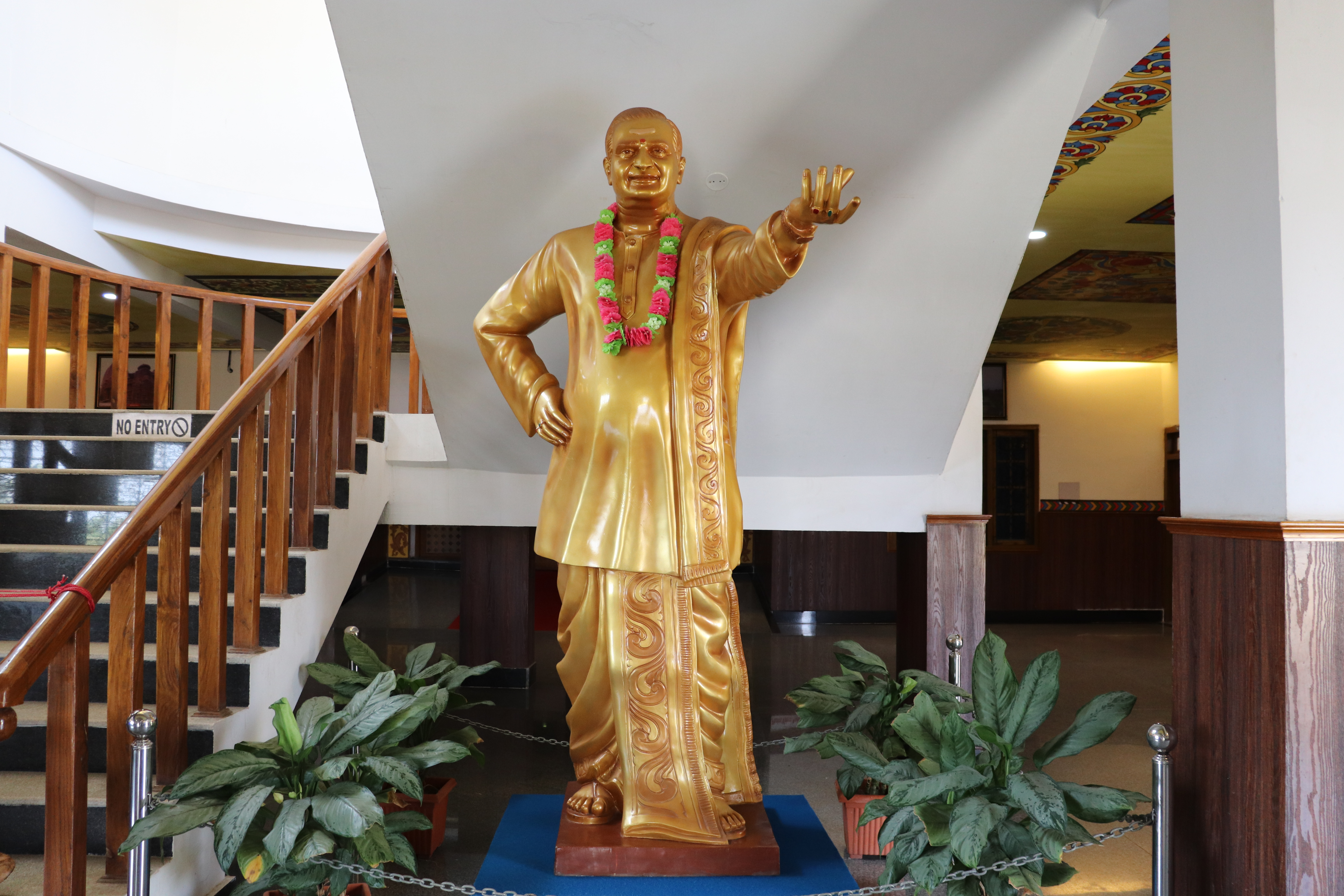
NTR Statue

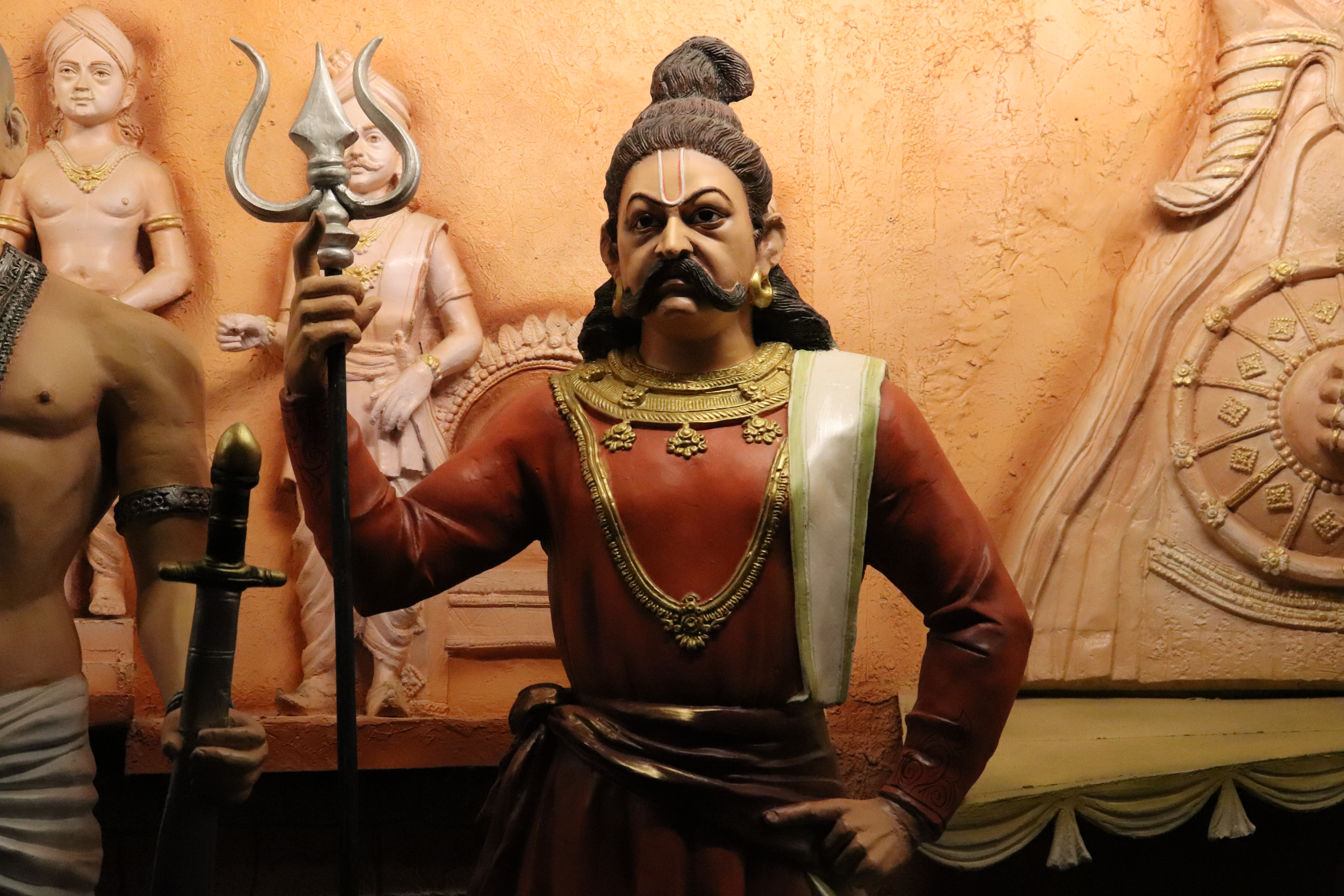
Palnati Brahmnanaidu

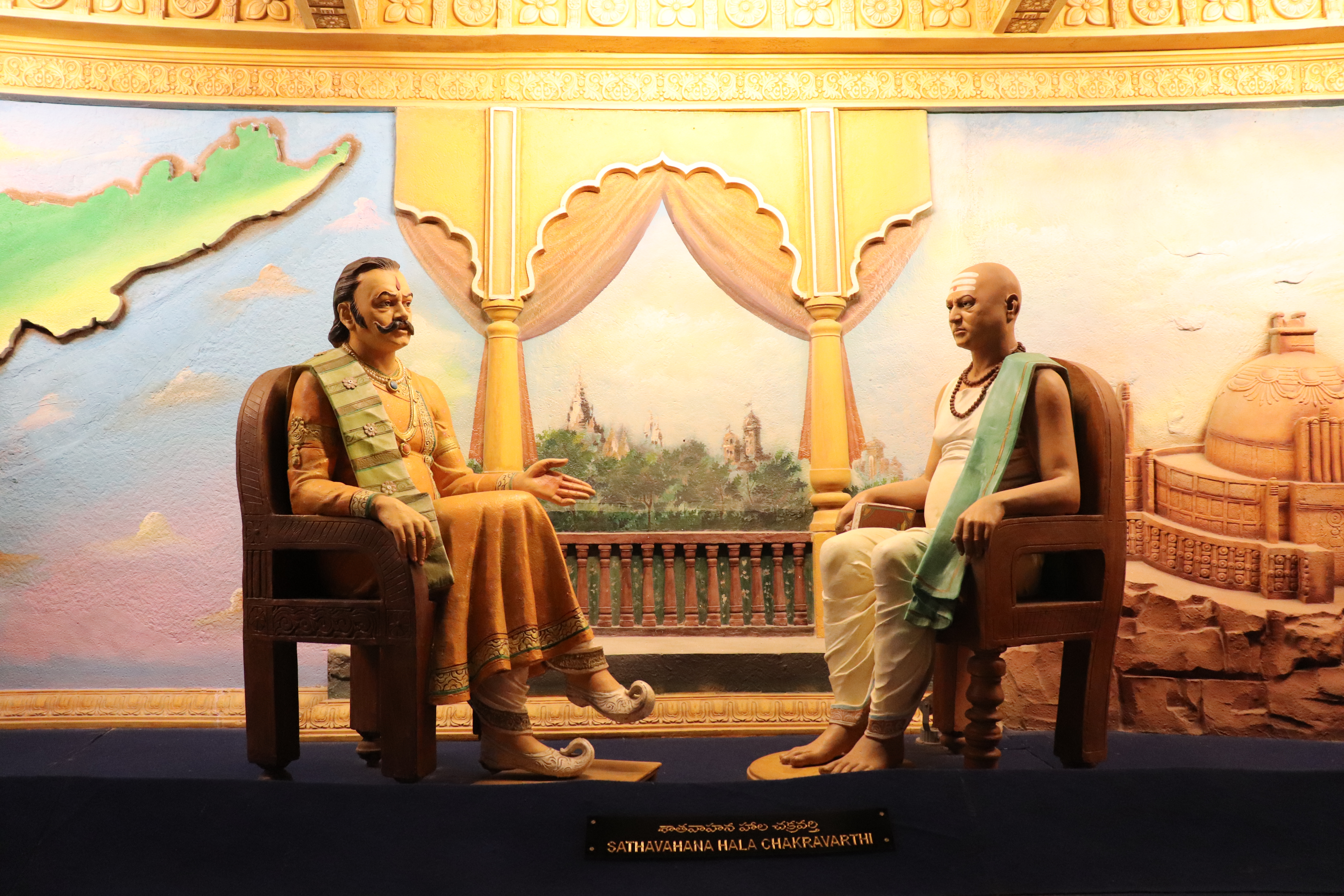
Satavahana Hala Chakravarti models

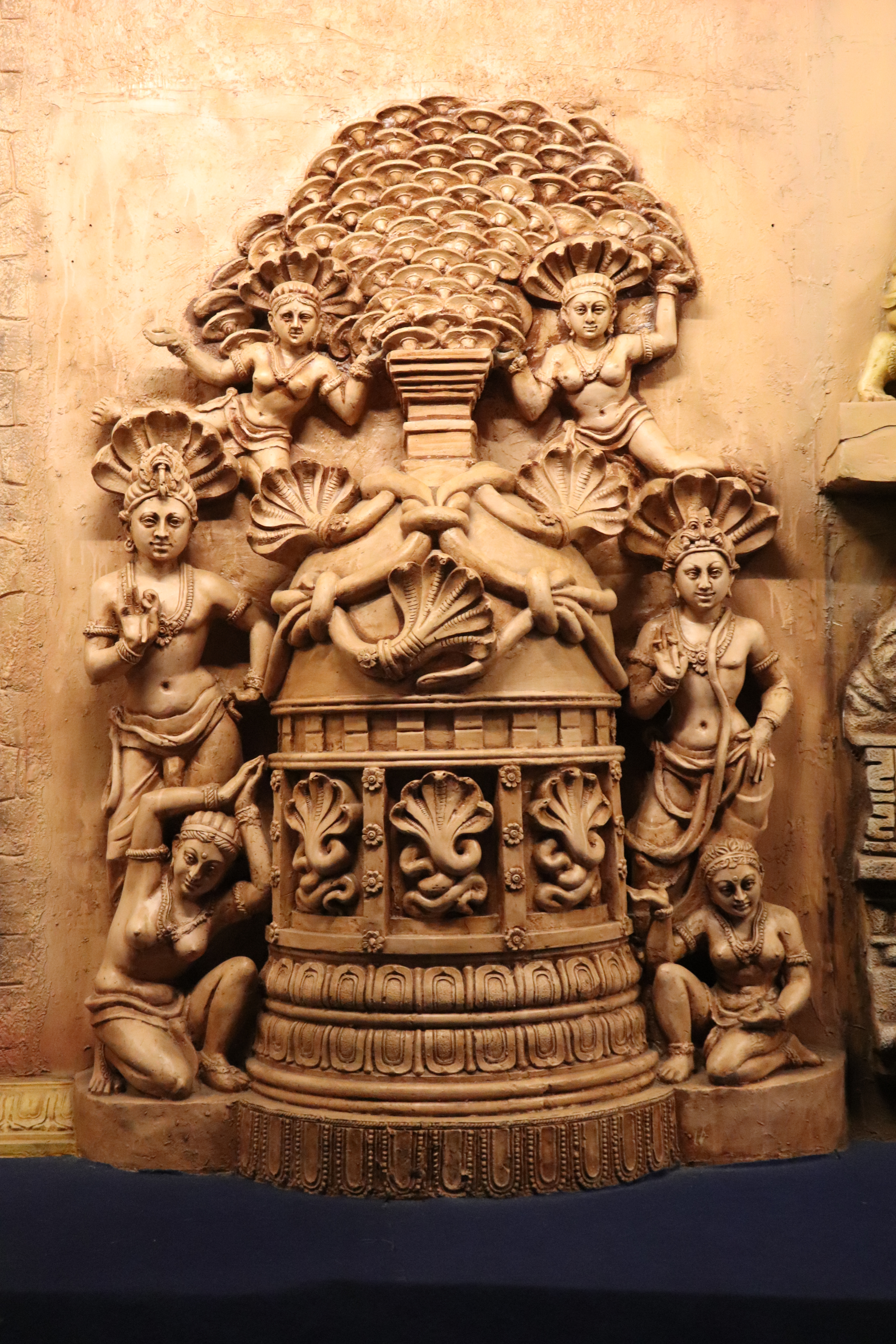
Sculpture of Nagas worshipping Buddha

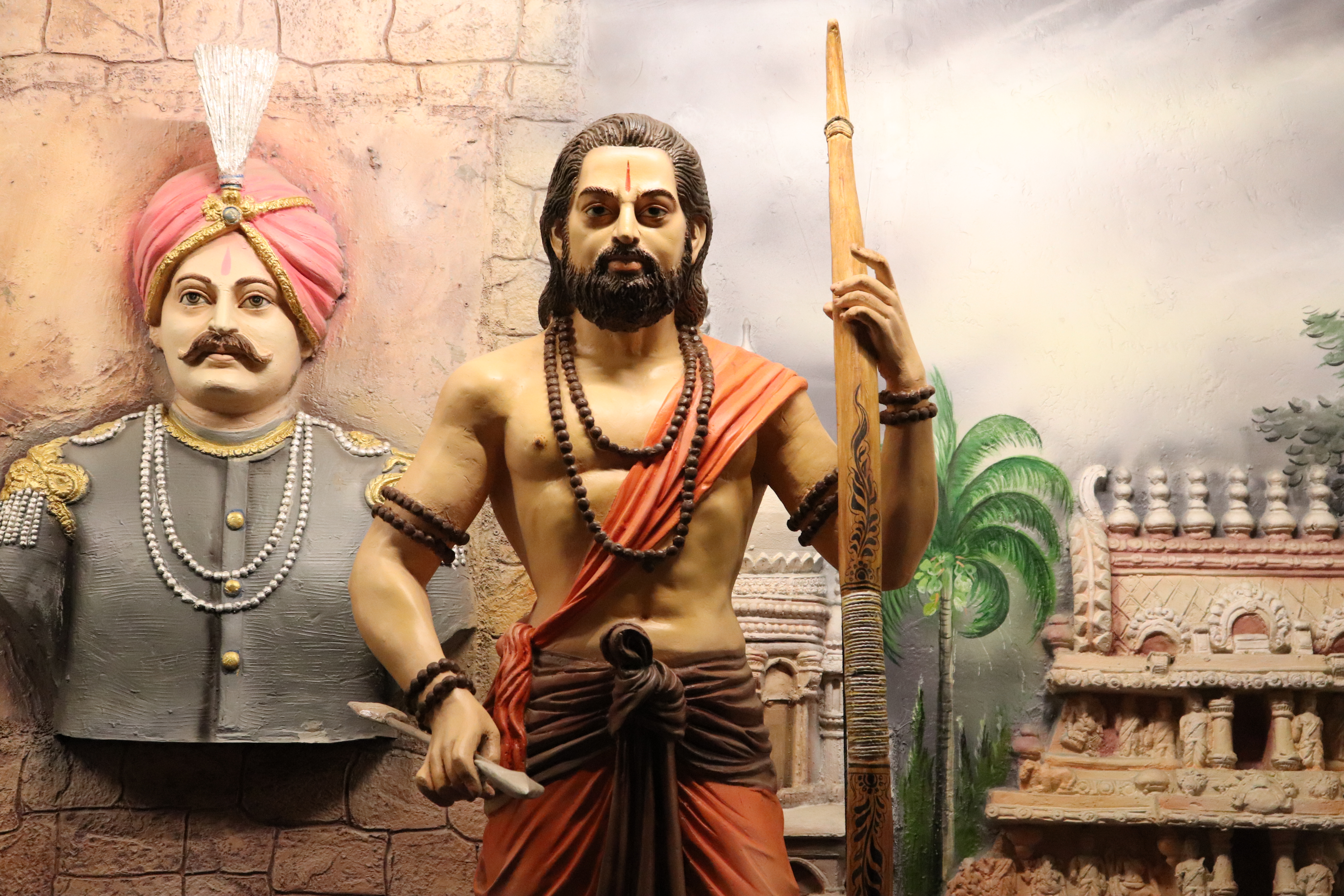
Alluri Sitaramaraju and Uyyalawada Narasimha Reddy(behind)

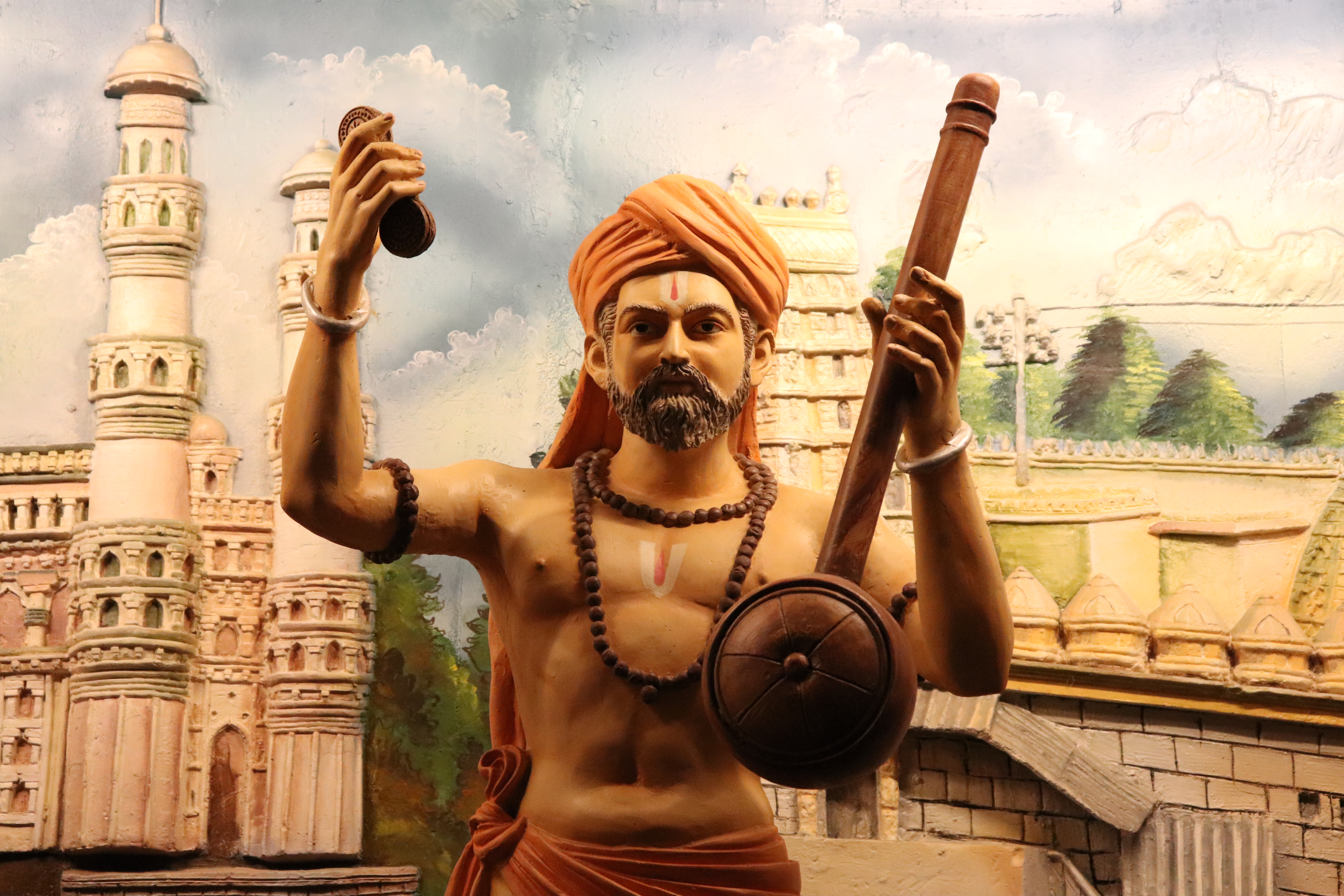
Statue of Annamayya

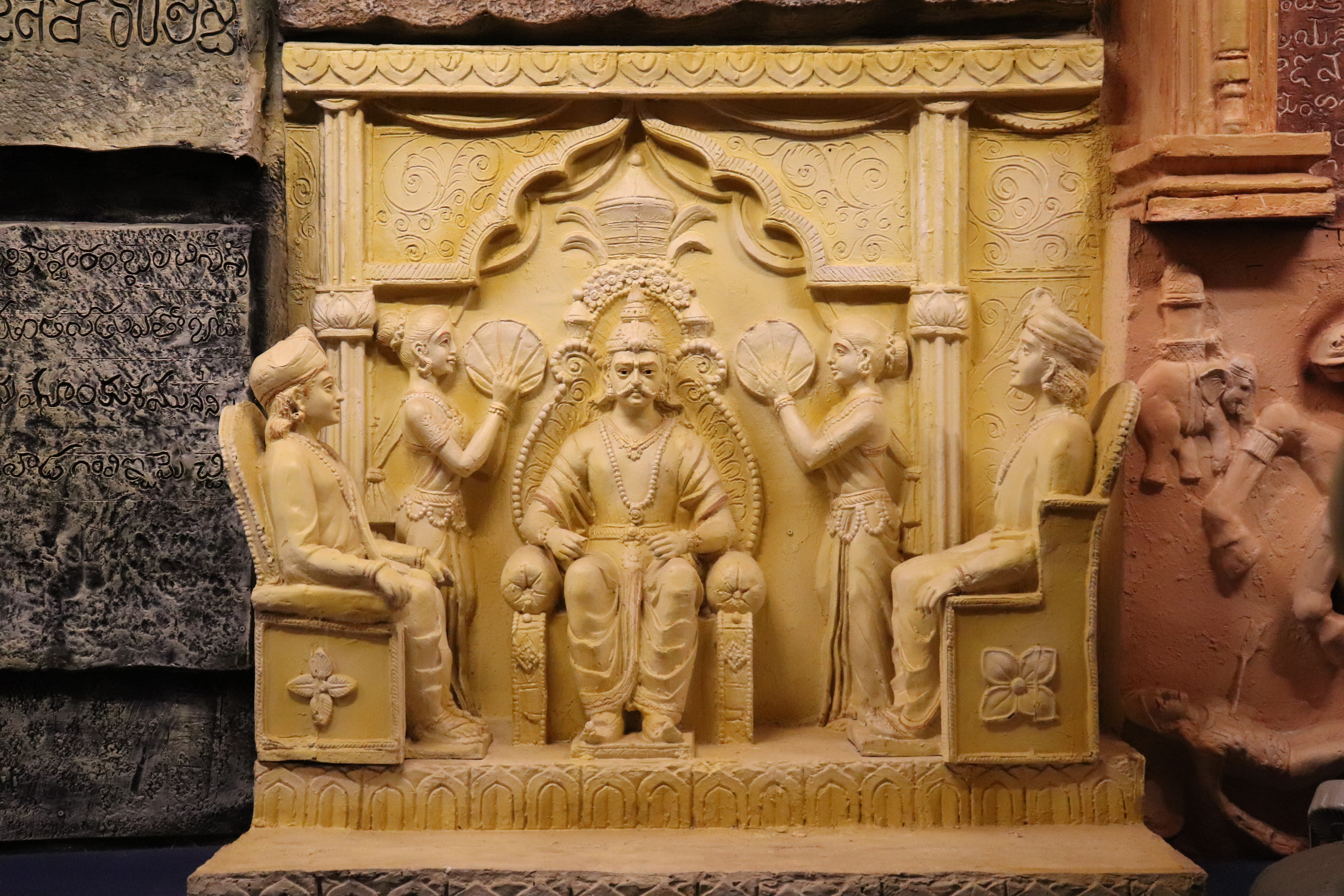
Court of Rajaraja Narendra

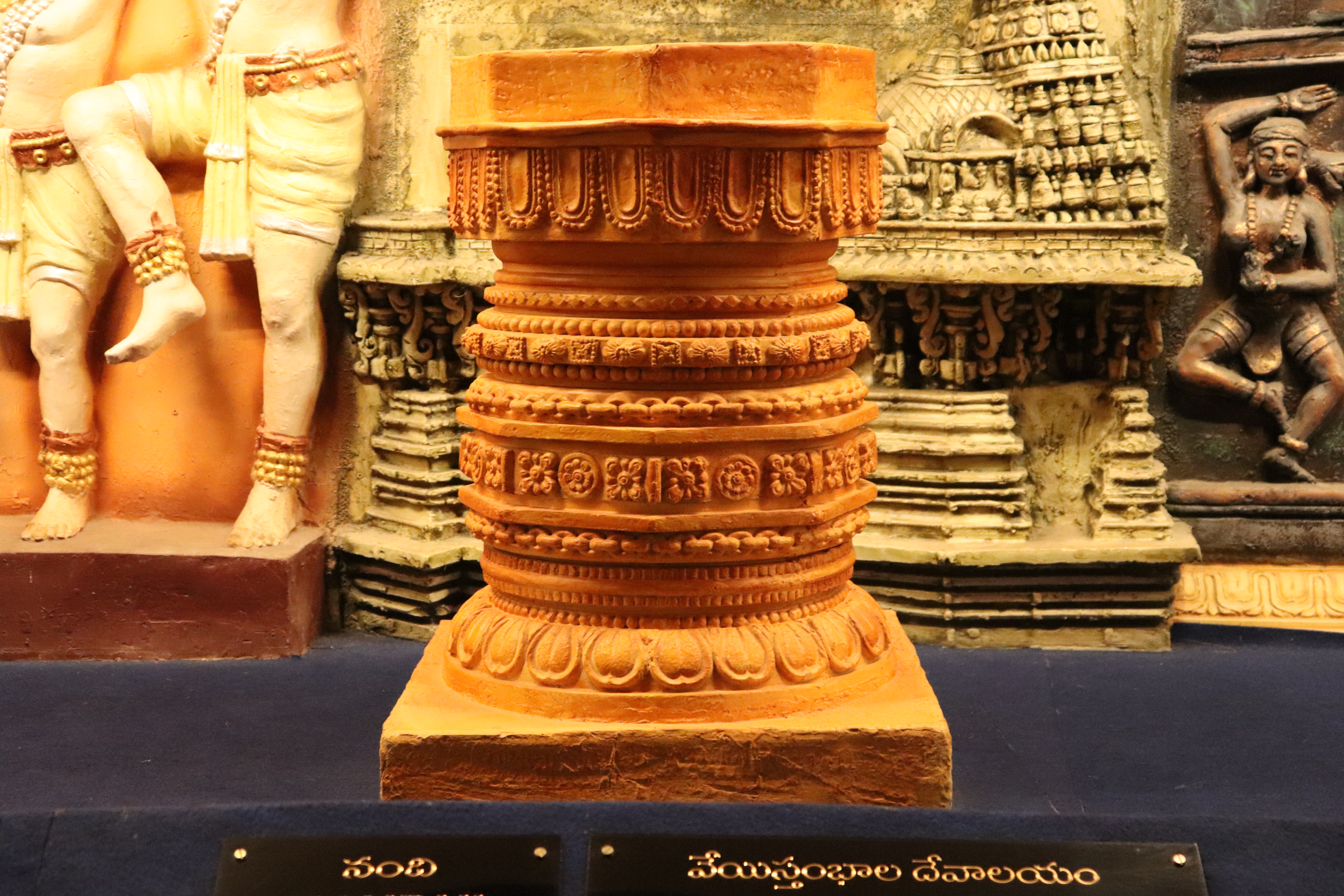
Typical column from Thousand Pillar temple

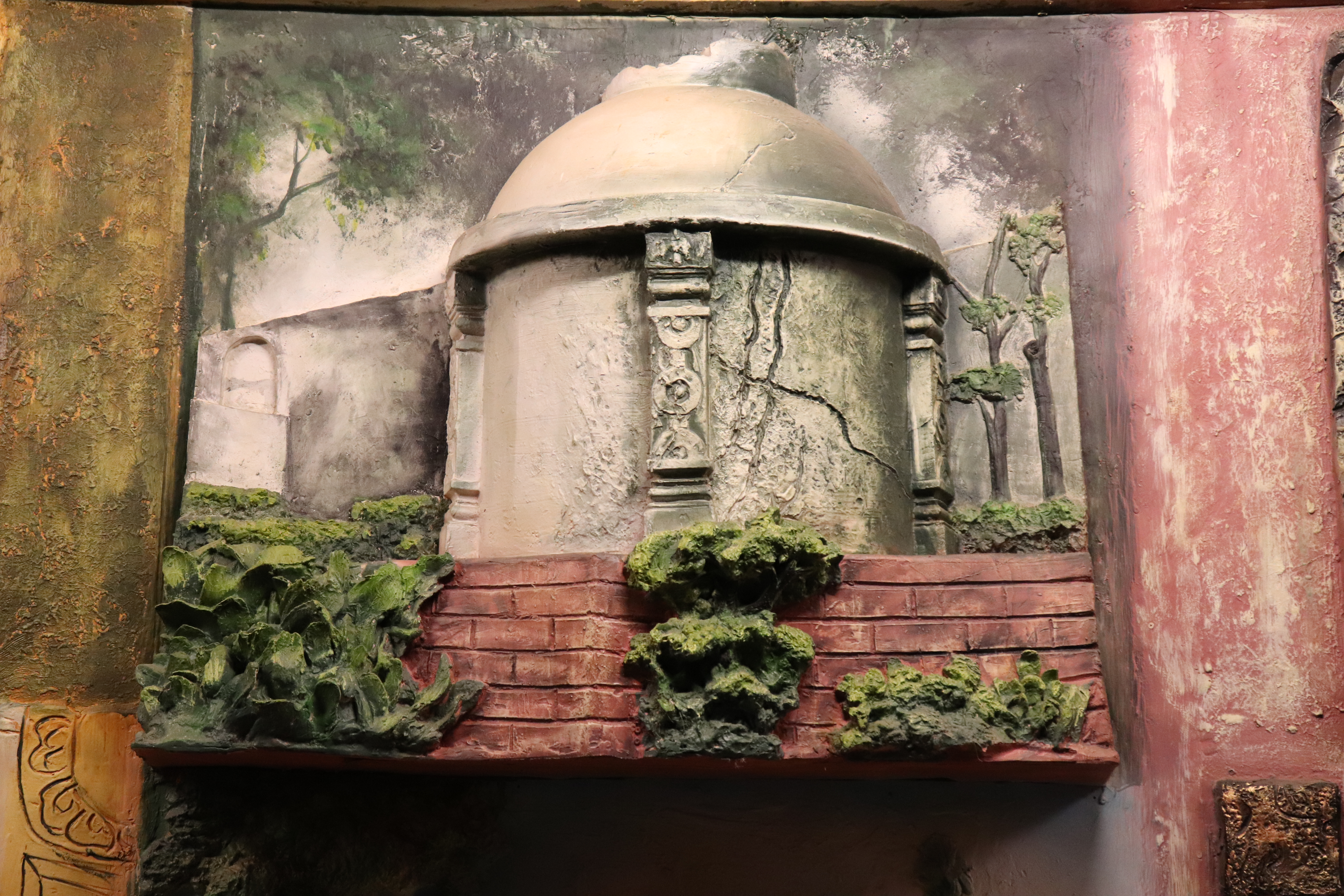
Shivalingam at Kotilingala

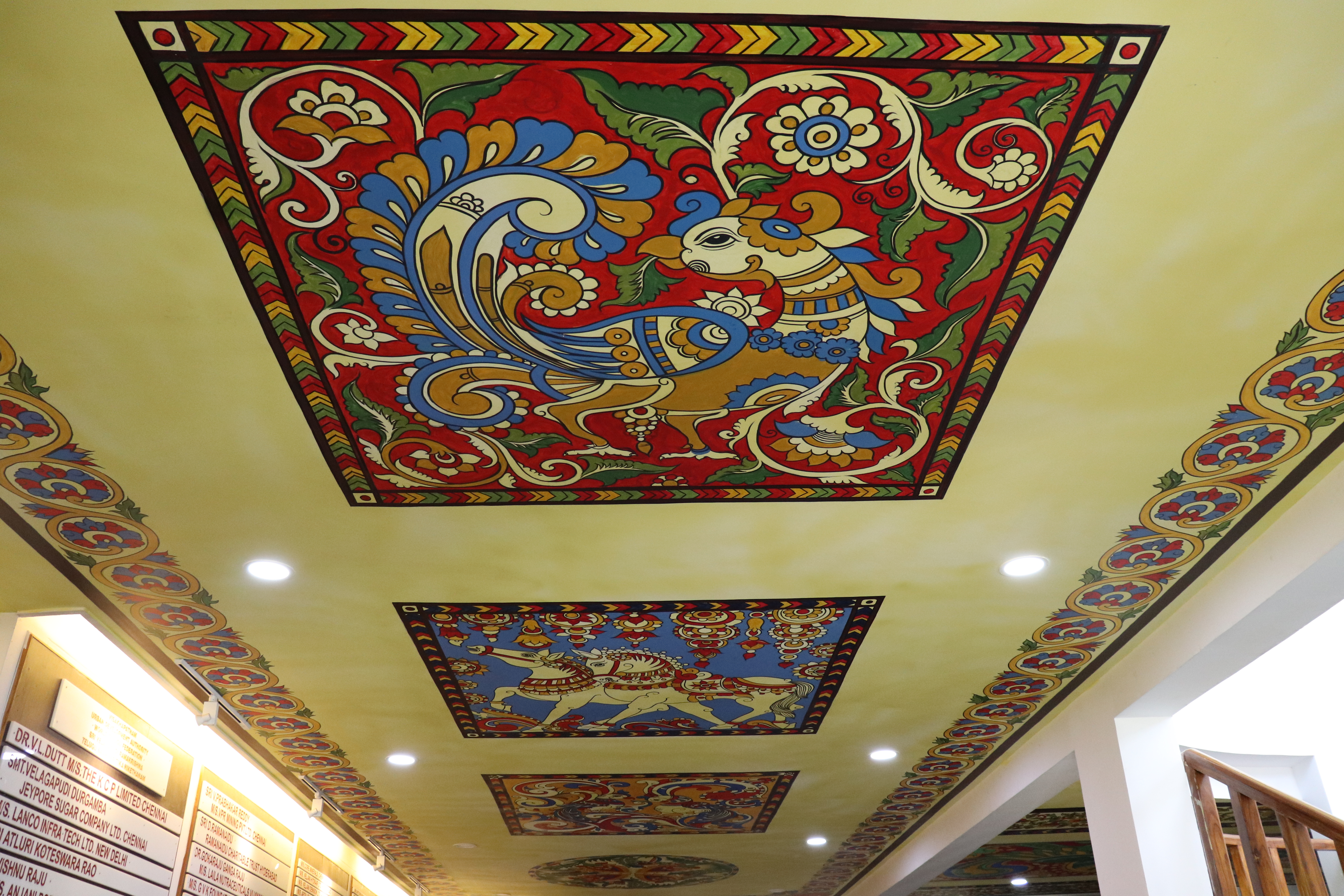
Paintings on ceiling

== See also ==
- List of museums in India
