= Resapuvanipalem =

- Neighbourhood
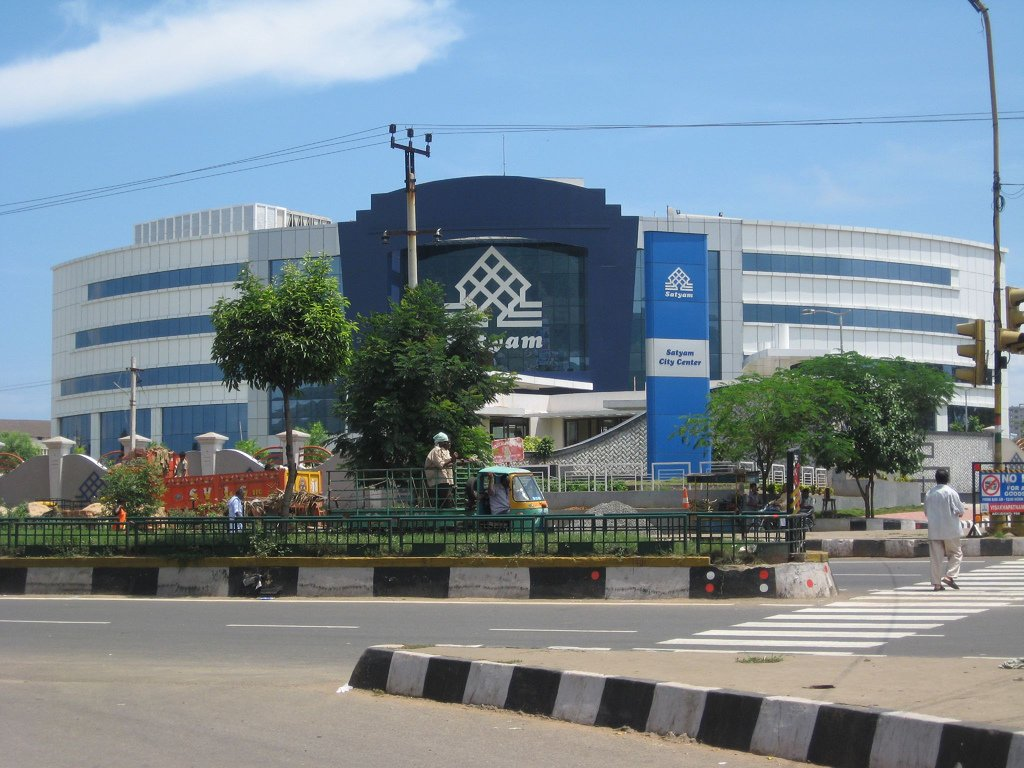
- Tech Mahindra Development Centre at Resupuvanipalem

- Location in Visakhapatnam
- Coordinates: 17.733310°N 83.315314°E
- Country: India
- State: Andhra Pradesh
- District: Visakhapatnam

Government
  - Body: Greater Visakhapatnam Municipal Corporation

Languages
  - Official: Telugu
- Time zone: UTC+5:30 (IST)
- PIN: 530013

Resupuvanipalem is a neighborhood in Visakhapatnam, Andhra Pradesh, India.

== About ==
Resupuvanipalem is one of the major commercial and residential suburbs in Visakhapatnam located to the west of Bay of Bengal. The Visakhapatnam BRTS Road connects Resupuvanipalem to Asilmetta and Dwaraka Nagar. Resupuvanipalem was an initially a small suburb between Asilmetta and Maddilapalem. One of the biggest indoor stadiums of Visakhapatnam Swarna Bharathi Indoor Stadium is located here.

== Commerce ==
The shopping area is good with corner grocery stores and others. Spencers market, reliance mart and many other shops are located here.

== Institutes ==
- Dr.L.Bullayya College

== Transport ==
The buses run by APSRTC connect Resupuvanipalem to all parts of the city.
