= Lankapalli Bullayya =

Indian educator and university vice chancellor

Lankapalli Bullayya (1918–1992) was an Indian educator and vice-chancellor of Andhra University, Andhra Pradesh. He was the first Dalit to be appointed vice-chancellor of an Indian university.

== Life and career ==
Bullayya was born in 1918 in Peravali, near Vemuru, Guntur district He had to travel long distances to receive his education. Bullayya received a B.A. degree with honours from Andhra University, and served as principal of a BEd college in Kurnool. He later became a District Educational Officer in Kurnool, Krishna and other districts and served in the Education Department as a senior-level officer. After the formation of Andhra State in 1953, Bullayya was appointed Director of Public Instruction. As Director of Higher Education for the government of Andhra Pradesh, he was instrumental in bringing about educational reform.

He considered the 10+2+3 plan in Andhra Pradesh before it was recommended by the Kothari Commission. In November 1968, Bullaya was appointed vice-chancellor, continuing in that post until December 1974. He sympathised with socially- and economically disadvantaged students, and was concerned about their welfare. Six affiliated colleges were permitted to establish postgraduate departments in selected subjects for the purpose of decentralisation. Coaching classes for civil-service examinations and the Continuing Education Scheme were introduced. For the first time in South India, a School of Correspondence Courses was established due to Bullayya's efforts. When university buildings were damaged after the 1970 cyclone which struck Visakhapatnam Bullayya showed photographs of the damage to University Grants Commission authorities in New Delhi, seeking grants for the repair of the buildings. The UGC granted funds not only for repairs, but for constructing new buildings.

Bullayya later served at the Union Public Service Commission in an advisory capacity on behalf of Telugu-speaking candidates at the UPSC Interview Board. He was chairman of the Andhra Pradesh and all-India units of the Boy Scouts and a director on the Andhra Bank Board. Bullayya's wife, Samyuktha, was also an educator and former chairman of the Andhra Pradesh Housing Board. His brother's sons Lankapally Ramesh Babu and Suresh Babu are public servants in Sanjeeva Reddy Nagar, Hyderabad. Dr. Bullayya College at Visakhapatnam was named after him. He founded Dr. V.S. Krishna Government College in remembrance of his predecessor, vice-chancellor Vasireddy Sri Krishna, and was more concerned about that school than the one named after himself. A bust of Bullayya has been installed in the School of Distance Education in Visakhapatnam.
