= Swarna Bharathi Indoor Stadium =

Stadium in Visakhapatnam, India

- Location: Resapuvanipalem, Visakhapatnam, India
- Owner: Greater Visakhapatnam Municipal Corporation
- Operator: Greater Visakhapatnam Municipal Corporation
- Capacity: 2,500

Swarna Bharathi Indoor Stadium is located at Visakhapatnam, India. It is used as a multipurpose venue.
