= COVID-19 pandemic in Chandigarh =

Ongoing COVID-19 viral pandemic in Chandigarh, India

- Disease: COVID-19
- Pathogen: SARS-CoV-2
- Location: Chandigarh, India
- First outbreak: Wuhan, Hubei, China
- Arrival date: 19 March 2020 (6 years, 5 months, 1 week and 6 days)
- Confirmed cases: 357 (15 June 2020)
- Active cases: 51
- Suspected cases: 11
- Recovered: 301 (15 June 2020)
- Deaths: 5 (2 June 2020)
- Fatality rate: 1.4%

Government website
- Official website

The first case of the COVID-19 pandemic in India was reported on 30 January 2020, originating from China. Slowly, the pandemic spread to various states and union territories including the union territory of Chandigarh. The first case was recorded in this region on 19 March 2020. As on 24 May, total number of cases in Chandigarh was 225. This contains 43 active cases as 179 successfully recovered from it and three died from the virus.

== Timeline ==
On 19 March, first confirmed case was reported in the union territory as a 23-year-old woman who had travel history to London tested positive.

=== June 2020 ===
- As on 7 June, total number of cases in Chandigarh was 318, including 40 active cases 5 deaths and 273 recoveries.
- As on 12 June, total number of cases in Chandigarh was 332, including 34 active cases 5 deaths and 293 recoveries.
- As on 16 June, total number of cases in Chandigarh was 365, including 58 active cases 6 deaths and 301 cures.
- As on 20 June, total number of cases in Chandigarh was 404, including 82 active cases 6 deaths and 316 recoveries.
- As on 24 June, total number of cases in Chandigarh was 420, including 92 active cases 6 deaths and 322 recoveries.
- As on 29 June, total number of cases in Chandigarh was 434, including 79 active cases, 349 cures and 6 fatalities.

=== July 2020 ===
- As on 5 July, total number of cases in Chandigarh was 466, including 65 active cases, 395 cures and 6 deaths.
- As on 12 July, total number of cases was 559, including 134 active cases, 417 recoveries and 8 deaths.
- As on 16 July, total number of cases in the UT was 635, including 148 active cases, 476 recoveries and 11 fatalities.
- As on 23 July, total number of cases was 800, including 256 active cases, 531 cures and 13 fatalities.
- As on 27 July, total number of cases in the UT was 910, including 320 active cases, 576 cures and 14 deaths.
- On 30 July, Chandigarh reached a grim milestone of 1000 total covid cases.

=== August 2020 ===
- As on 3 August, total number of cases in Chandigarh was 1079, including 378 active cases, 683 recoveries and 18 deaths.
- As on 9 August, total number of cases was 1426, including 529 active cases, 873 recoveries and 24 deaths.
- As on 11 August, total number of cases was 1669, including 628 active cases, 1015 recoveries and 26 deaths.
- As on 14 August, total number of cases was 1928, including 807 active cases, 1091 recoveries and 28 deaths.
- As on 19 August, total number of cases was 2396. This includes 1012 active cases, 1351 cures and 31 deaths.
- As on 25 August, total number of cases in the UT was 3209. This includes 1454 active cases, 1713 cures and 40 fatalities.

=== September 2020 ===
- As on 1 September, total number of cases in Chandigarh was 4547, including 1939 active cases, 2551 recoveries and 57 deaths.
- On 3 September, Chandigarh reached a grim milestone of 5000 covid cases. As on 20 September, total number of cases in the UT is 10079, including 2821 active cases, 7138 recoveries and 120 deaths. As on 3 September, total number of cases was 5065, including 2116 active cases, 2883 recoveries and 63 deaths.
- As on 6 September, total number of cases was 5763, including 2351 active cases, 3338 recoveries and 71 fatalities.
- As on 10 September, total number of cases was 6987, including 2573 active cases, 4331 recoveries and 80 fatalities.
- As on 13 September, total number of cases was 7991, including 2728 active cases, 5170 cures and 90 fatalities.
- As on 16 September, total number of cases was 8955, including 3171 active cases, 5683 cures and 101 deaths.
- On 20 September, Chandigarh reached a grim milestone of 10000 total covid cases. As on 20 September, total number of cases in the UT is 10079, including 2821 active cases, 7138 recoveries and 120 deaths.
- As on 23 September, total number of cases was 10726, including 2537 active cases, 8049 recoveries and 137 deaths.
- As on 28 September, total number of cases was 11678, including 2200 active cases, 9325 recoveries and 153 deaths.

=== October 2020 ===
- As on 3 October, total number of cases in Chandigarh was 12360, including 1792 active cases, 10396 recoveries and 172 deaths.
- As on 10 October, total number of cases in the UT was 13081, including 1229 active cases, 11662 recoveries and 190 deaths.
- As on 14 October, total number of cases was 13403, including 1085 active cases, 12119 cures and 199 deaths.
- As on 26 October, total number of cases is 14038, including 653 active cases, 13167 recoveries and 218 deaths.
- As on 31 October, total number of cases in the UT is 14418, including 641 active cases, 13551 recoveries and 226 fatalities.

=== November 2020 ===
- As on 8 November, total number of cases in Chandigarh was 15134, including 876 active cases, 14024 recoveries and 234 deaths.
- As on 10 November, total number of cases was 15339, including 922 active cases, 14176 recoveries and 241 deaths.
- As on 23 November, total number of cases was 16769, including 1117 active cases, 15389 cures and 263 deaths.
- As on 26 November, total number of cases is 17051, including 1169 active cases, 15612 recoveries and 270 deaths.

=== December 2020 ===
- As on 2 December, total number of cases in Chandigarh was 17642, including 1082 active cases, 16279 recoveries and 281 deaths.
- As on 7 December, total number of cases was 18113, including 921 active cases, 16899 recoveries and 293 deaths.
- As on 13 December, total number of cases was 18638, including 766 active cases, 17571 recoveries and 301 fatalities.
- As on 15 December, total number of cases was 18776, including 635 active cases, 17837 cures and 304 fatalities.
- As on 23 December, total number of cases in the UT was 19266, including 369 active cases, 18584 cures and 313 deaths.
- As on 30 December, total number of cases was 19682, including 399 active cases, 18967 cures and 316 deaths.
- As on 31 December, total number of cases was 19748, including 386 active cases, 19045 cures and 317 deaths.

=== January 2021 ===
- As on 5 January, total number of cases in Chandigarh was 20026, including 240 active cases, 19464 recoveries and 322 fatalities. On this day, Chandigarh crossed a milestone of 20000 COVID-19 cases.
- As on 10 January, total number of cases was 20295, including 241 active cases, 19727 recoveries and 327 deaths.
- As on 21 January, total number of cases was 20639, including 146 active cases, 20162 recoveries and 331 deaths.

=== February 2021 ===
- As on 1 February, total number of cases in Chandigarh was 20957, including 240 active cases, 20447 recoveries and 334 fatalities.
- As on 10 February, total number of cases was 21145, including 158 active cases, 20645 recoveries and 342 deaths.
- As on 20 February, total number of cases was 21397, including 169 active cases, 20879 recoveries and 349 deaths.

=== March 2021 ===
- As on 6 March, total number of cases in Chandigarh was 22238, including 675 active cases, 21208 recoveries and 355 fatalities.
- As on 22 March, total number of cases in the UT was 24667, including 1979 active cases, 22325 recoveries and 363 deaths.
- As on 29 March, total number of cases was 26468, including 2746 active cases, 23345 recoveries and 377 deaths.

=== April 2021 ===
- As on 4 April, total number of cases in Chandigarh was 28194, including 3150 active cases, 24661 recoveries and 383 deaths.
- As on 8 April, total number of cases was 29521, including 3115 active cases, 26017 recoveries and 385 deaths.
- As on 20 April, total number of cases was 35148, including 3959 active cases, 30768 cures and 421 fatalities.

=== May 2021 ===
- As on 7 May, total number of cases in Chandigarh was 48442, including 8505 active cases, 39388 recoveries and 549 deaths.
- As on 11 May, total number of cases was 51857, including 8625 active cases, 42647 cures and 585 deaths.
- As on 18 May, total number of cases was 56513, including 7035 active cases, 48831 cures and 647 fatalities.
- As on 25 May, total number of cases is 58992, including 4063 active cases, 54215 recoveries and 714 fatalities.

=== June 2021 ===
- As on 17 June, total number of cases in Chandigarh was 61273, including 395 active cases, 60076 recoveries and 802 deaths.
- As on 23 June, total number of cases was 61520, including 267 active cases, 60446 recoveries and 807 fatalities.

=== July 2021 ===
- As on 13 July, total number of cases in Chandigarh was 61844, including 77 active cases, 60958 recoveries and 809 deaths.
- As on 19 July, total number of cases is 61983, including 46 active cases, 61038 recoveries and 809 deaths.

=== August 2021 ===
- As on 27 August, total number of cases in Chandigarh was 65058, including 42 active cases, 64230 recoveries and 812 deaths.
- As on 29 August, total number of cases was 65087, including 38 active cases, 64236 cures and 813 deaths.

=== September 2021 ===
- As on 23 September, total number of cases in Chandigarh was 65201, including 44 active cases, 64338 recoveries and 819 deaths.
- As on 25 September, total number of cases in the UT was 65205, including 41 active cases, 64345 cures and 819 deaths.

=== Oct to Dec 2021 ===
- As on 7 October, total number of cases in Chandigarh was 65252, including 41 active cases, 64391 recoveries and 820 deaths.
- As on 23 October, total number of cases was 65321, including 27 active cases, 64474 cures and 820 deaths.
- As on 2 November, total number of cases in the UT was 65351, including 36 active cases, 64495 recoveries and 820 fatalities.
- As on 4 December, total number of cases in the UT was 65478, including 64 active cases, 64594 recoveries and 820 fatalities. There hasn't been any Covid related death in Chandigarh in the last couple of months.
- As on 29 December, total number of cases in the UT was 65796, including 100 active cases, 64617 recoveries and 1079 fatalities.

=== Jan to Mar 2022 ===
- As on 10 January, total number of cases in Chandigarh was 68421, including 2364 active cases, 64977 cures and 1080 deaths.
- As on 15 January, total number of cases was 76270, including 8511 active cases, 66673 cures and 1086 deaths.
- As on 28 January, total number of cases in the UT was 88382, including 4647 active cases, 82623 recoveries and 1112 deaths.
- As on 11 February, total number of cases in the UT was 91209, including 728 active cases, 89332 recoveries and 1149 deaths.
- As on 21 February, total number of cases in the UT was 91585, including 216 active cases, 90207 recoveries and 1162 fatal cases.
- As on 19 March, total number of cases in the UT was 91880, including 35 active cases, 90680 recoveries and 1165 fatalities.

=== Apr to Jun 2022 ===
- As on 11 April, total number of cases in Chandigarh was 91945, including 16 active cases, 90764 cures and 1165 deaths.
- As on 30 April, total number of cases was 92069, including 71 active cases, 90833 cures and 1165 fatalities.
- As on 11 May, total number of cases in the UT was 92190, including 93 active cases, 90932 cures and 1165 fatalities.
- As on 15 May, total number of cases was 92226, including 90 active cases, 90971 cures and 1165 fatalities.
- As on 29 May, total number of cases was 92374, including 91 active cases, 91118 recoveries and 1165 deaths.
- As on 10 June, total number of cases was 92652, including 152 active cases, 91335 cures and 1165 deaths.
- As on 22 June, total number of cases was 93217, including 417 active cases, 91665 cures and 1165 deaths.
- As on 27 June, total number of cases was 93604, including 502 active cases, 91937 recoveries and 1165 fatal cases.

=== July to September 2022 ===
- As on 17 July, total number of cases in Chandigarh was 94848, including 400 active cases, 93183 cures and 1165 deaths.
- As on 29 August, total number of cases was 98723, including 305 active cases, 97237 cures and 1181 fatalities.
- As on 6 September, total number of cases was 98950, including 308 active cases, 97561 recoveries and 1181 fatalities.
- As on 17 September, total number of cases was 99131, including 193 active cases, 97857 recoveries and 1181 deaths.
- As on 26 October, total number of cases was 99289, including 9 active cases, 98099 cures and 1181 deaths.

== Statistics ==
=== Graphs ===
==== Total confirmed cases, active cases, recoveries and deaths ====
Total confirmed cases Active Cases Recoveries Deaths

==== Daily new deaths ====
'Note:'Sources: MOHFW.GOV.IN

== COVID-19 Vaccines with Approval for Emergency or Conditional Usage ==
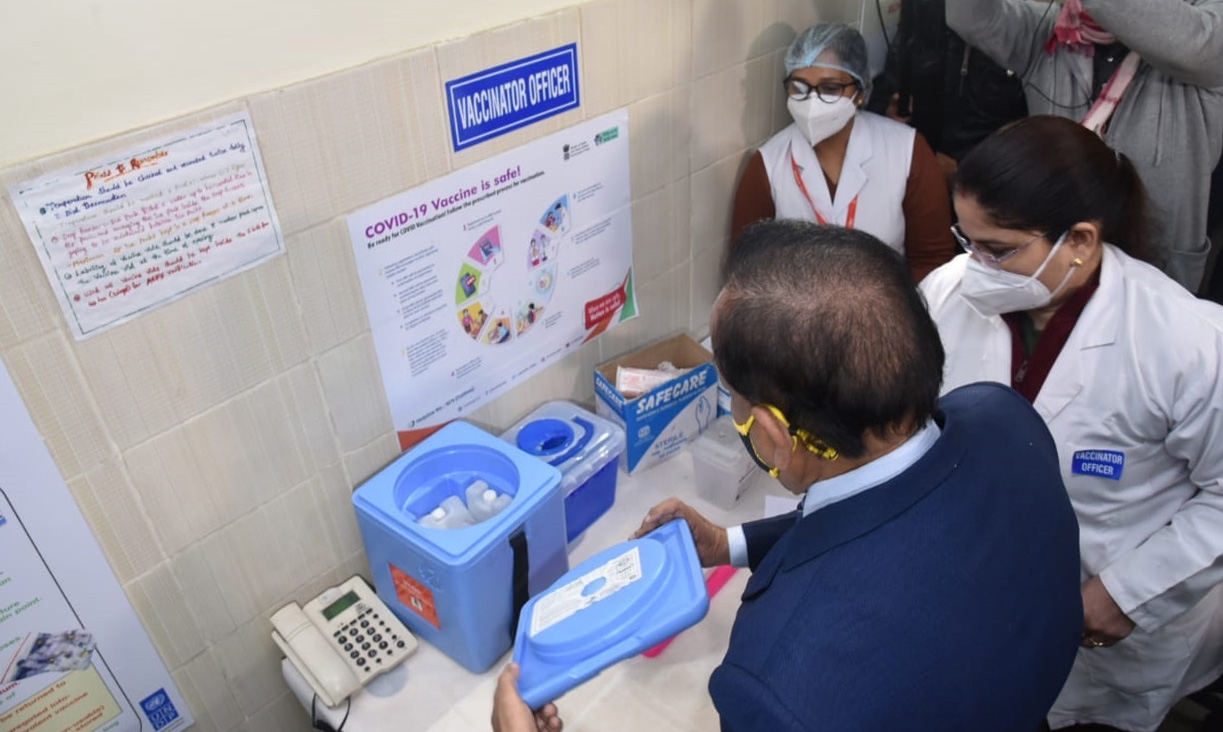
Union Minister for Health & Family Welfare, Dr. Harsh Vardhan visiting the GTB Hospital, Shahdara to review the preparedness of Dry Run of COVID-19 vaccine, in Delhi on January 02, 2021.

=== Covishield ===
On 1 January 2021, the Drug Controller General of India, approved the emergency or conditional use of AstraZeneca's COVID-19 vaccine AZD1222 (marketed as Covishield). Covishield is developed by the University of Oxford and its spin-out company, Vaccitech. It's a viral vector vaccine based on replication-deficient Adenovirus that causes cold in Chimpanzees. It can be stored, transported and handled at normal refrigerated conditions (two-eight degrees Celsius/ 36-46 degrees Fahrenheit). It has a shelf-life of at least six months.

On 12 January 2021 first batches of Covishield vaccine was despatched from the Serum Institute of India.

=== Covaxin ===
On 2 January 2021, BBV152 (marketed as Covaxin), first indigenous vaccine, developed by Bharat Biotech in association with the Indian Council of Medical Research and National Institute of Virology received approval from the Drug Controller General of India for its emergency or conditional usage.

On 14 January 2021 first batches of Covaxin vaccine was despatched from the Bharat Biotech, albeit it was still in the third phase of testing.

=== Others ===
On 19 May 2021, Dr Reddy's Labs received Emergency Use Authorisation for anti-COVID drug 2-DG. On 21 February 2022, Drugs Controller General of India granted approval to Biological E's COVID-19 vaccine Corbevax, that can be used for children between 12 and 18 years of age.

On 21 October 2021, India completed administering of one billion Covid vaccines in the country.

On 8 January 2022, India crossed 1.5 billion Covid vaccines milestone in the country.

On 19 February 2022, India crossed 1.75 billion Covid vaccines milestone in the country.

== See also ==
- COVID-19 pandemic in India
- COVID-19 pandemic in the World
