= COVID-19 pandemic in Himachal Pradesh =

Ongoing COVID-19 viral pandemic in Himachal Pradesh, India

COVID-19 Pandemic in Himachal Pradesh
- Disease: COVID-19
- Pathogen: SARS-CoV-2
- Location: Himachal Pradesh, India
- First outbreak: Wuhan, Hubei, China
- Arrival date: 20 March 2020 (6 years, 5 months, 1 week and 6 days)
- Active cases: 176
- Recovered: 320 (13 June 2020) (Note: 4 migrated cases to other states are also included here)
- Deaths: 6 (10 June 2020)
- Fatality rate: 1.2%

The first case of the COVID-19 pandemic in India was reported on 30 January 2020, originating from China. Slowly, the pandemic spread to various states and union territories including the state of Himachal Pradesh. The first case was recorded in this region on 20 March 2020.

== Timeline ==
=== May 2020 ===
- As on 24 May, the total number of cases in Himachal Pradesh is 182, including 121 active cases, 57 recoveries, and four deaths.

=== June 2020 ===
- As on 7 June, total number of cases in Himachal Pradesh was 413, including 185 active cases 6 deaths and 219 recoveries.
- As on 12 June, total number of cases in Himachal Pradesh was 486, including 176 active cases 7 deaths and 293 cures.
- As on 16 June, total number of cases in Himachal Pradesh was 550, including 182 active cases 7 deaths and 361 cures.
- As on 23 June, total number of cases in Himachal Pradesh was 714, including 278 active cases 7 deaths and 429 recoveries.
- As on 25 June, total number of cases was 837, including 338 active cases 8 fatalities and 491 recoveries.

=== July 2020 ===
- As on 1 July, total number of cases in Himachal Pradesh is 967, including 341 active cases 9 deaths and 617 recoveries.
- Total number of cases in Himachal crossed the grim milestone of 1000 persons on 3 July.
- As on 8 July, total number of cases in Himachal Pradesh was 1088, including 258 active cases 10 deaths and 820 recoveries.
- As on 15 July, total number of cases was 1330, including 351 active cases 10 deaths and 969 cures.
- As on 18 July, total number of cases was 1442, including 402 active cases 10 deaths and 1030 cures.
- As on 26 July, total number of cases was 2121, including 930 active cases 13 deaths and 1178 cures.
- As on 30 July, total number of cases in Himachal is 2512, including 1094 active cases 13 deaths and 1388 cures.

=== August 2020 ===
- As on 3 August, total number of cases in Himachal Pradesh was 2803, including 1125 active cases, 13 deaths and 1665 recoveries.
- As on 6 August, total number of cases was 3029, including 1141 active cases, 1865 recoveries and 13 deaths.
- As on 10 August, total number of cases was 3347, including 1152 active cases, 2181 cures and 14 deaths.
- As on 14 August, total number of cases was 3838, including 1269 active cases, 2551 cures and 18 deaths.
- As on 20 August, total number of cases was 4411, including 1357 active cases, 2992 recoveries and 20 fatalities.
- As on 25 August, total number of cases in the state was 5154, including 1323 active cases, 3748 recoveries and 29 deaths.

=== September 2020 ===
- As on 1 September, total number of cases in Himachal Pradesh was 6212, including 1525 active cases, 41 deaths and 4646 recoveries.
- As on 3 September, total number of cases was 6406, including 1613 active cases, 42 deaths and 4751 recoveries.
- As on 7 September, total number of cases was 7648, including 2234 active cases, 5359 cures and 55 deaths.
- As on 12 September, total number of cases was 9229, including 3193 active cases, 5947 cures and 72 deaths.
- On 15 September, total number of cases in Himachal crossed the grim milestone of 10000 cases.
- As on 16 September, total number of cases was 10768, including 4147 active cases, 6531 cures and 90 deaths.
- As on 21 September, total number of cases was 12438, including 4457 active cases, 7836 cures and 125 fatalities.
- As on 28 September, total number of cases was 14457, including 5650 active cases, 10607 cures and 175 fatalities.

=== October 2020 ===
- As on 2 October, total number of cases in Himachal Pradesh was 15454, including 3256 active cases, 205 deaths and 11976 recoveries.
- As on 3 October, total number of cases was 15695, including 3272 active cases, 205 deaths and 12173 recoveries.
- As on 4 October, total number of cases was 15851, including 3273 active cases, 12341 cures and 212 deaths.
- As on 10 October, total number of cases was 17222, including 2718 active cases, 14261 recoveries and 243 deaths.
- As on 19 October, total number of cases was 19082, including 2577 active cases, 16238 cures and 267 deaths.
- On 24 October 2020, total number of Covid cases in Himachal Pradesh crossed the grim milestone of 20000 cases.
- As on 27 October, total number of cases was 20787, including 2520 active cases, 17974 recoveries and 293 deaths.

=== November 2020 ===
- As on 8 November, total number of cases in Himachal Pradesh was 25456, including 4710 active cases, 371 deaths and 20375 recoveries.
- As on 23 November, total number of cases was 34745, including 6677 active cases, 27518 cures and 550 deaths.
- As on 25 November, total number of cases was 36530, including 7875 active cases, 28080 cures and 575 fatalities.
- As on 29 November, total number of cases was 39962, including 8644 active cases, 30693 recoveries and 625 deaths.

=== December 2020 ===
- As on 3 December, total number of cases in Himachal Pradesh was 42653, including 8088 active cases, 33880 recoveries and 685 deaths.
- As on 5 December, total number of cases was 44361, including 8247 active cases, 35403 recoveries and 711 fatalities.
- As on 11 December, total number of cases was 47659, including 7865 active cases, 39031 cures and 763 fatalities.
- On 15 December, total number of cases in Himachal crossed the grim milestone of 50000 cases. As on 15 December, total number of cases was 50147, including 6792 active cases, 42931 recoveries and 824 fatalities.
- As on 20 December, total number of cases was 52281, including 5196 active cases, 46221 recoveries and 864 deaths.
- As on 22 December, total number of cases was 52908, including 4799 active cases, 47240 recoveries and 877 deaths.
- As on 23 December, total number of cases was 53345, including 4629 active cases, 47834 cures and 882 deaths.
- As on 28 December, total number of cases was 54633, including 3680 active cases, 50044 recoveries and 909 fatalities.
- As on 30 December, total number of cases was 55114, including 2796 active cases, 51351 cures and 919 fatalities.
- As on 31 December, total number of cases was 55229, including 2615 active cases, 51692 cures and 922 deaths.

=== January 2021 ===
- As on 5 January, total number of cases in Himachal Pradesh was 55862, including 1437 active cases, 53487 recoveries and 938 deaths.
- As on 10 January, total number of cases was 56404, including 971 active cases, 54486 recoveries and 947 deaths.
- As on 12 January, total number of cases was 56548, including 810 active cases, 54789 recoveries and 949 deaths.
- As on 19 January, total number of cases was 57003, including 584 active cases, 55464 recoveries and 955 deaths.
- As on 24 January, total number of cases was 57194, including 436 active cases, 55797 recoveries and 961 fatalities.

=== February 2021 ===
- As on 1 February, total number of cases in Himachal Pradesh was 57545, including 378 active cases, 56200 recoveries and 967 deaths.
- As on 13 February, total number of cases was 58188, including 524 active cases, 56685 cures and 979 deaths.
- As on 20 February, total number of cases was 58353, including 252 active cases, 57120 recoveries and 981 deaths.

=== March 2021 ===
- As on 6 March, total number of cases in Himachal Pradesh was 59046, including 589 active cases, 57473 recoveries and 984 deaths.
- As on 14 March, total number of cases was 59661, including 760 active cases, 57908 recoveries and 993 deaths.
- As on 29 March, total number of cases was 62963, including 2634 active cases, 59303 cures and 1034 deaths.

=== April 2021 ===
- As on 4 April, total number of cases in Himachal Pradesh was 65221, including 3577 active cases, 60587 recoveries and 1057 fatalities.
- As on 13 April, total number of cases is 71374, including 6269 active cases, 63966 recoveries and 1122 deaths.

=== May 2021 ===
- On 2 May 2021, total number of Covid cases in Himachal Pradesh crossed the grim milestone of 100000 cases.
- As on 7 May, total number of cases was 122866, including 29513 active cases, 91573 recoveries and 1780 fatalities.
- As on 11 May, total number of cases was 166650, including 34888 active cases, 129315 cures and 2447 deaths.
- As on 25 May, total number of cases is 182957, including 23053 active cases, 157031 cures and 2873 fatalities.

=== June 2021 ===
- As on 17 June, total number of cases in Himachal Pradesh was 199679, including 3430 active cases, 192841 recoveries and 3408 deaths.
- On 18 June 2021, total number of Covid cases in Himachal Pradesh crossed the grim milestone of 200000 cases.
- As on 23 June, total number of cases was 201049, including 2287 active cases, 195289 cures and 3445 deaths.

=== July 2021 ===
- As on 19 July, total number of cases in Himachal Pradesh was 204516, including 969 active cases, 200036 recoveries and 3491 deaths.

=== August 2021 ===
- As on 27 August, total number of cases in Himachal Pradesh was 212913, including 1965 active cases, 207356 cures and 3569 deaths.

=== September 2021 ===
- As on 23 September, total number of cases in Himachal Pradesh was 217615, including 1823 active cases, 212133 cures and 3643 deaths.
- As on 26 September, total number of cases was 218202, including 1800 active cases, 212736 cures and 3650 deaths.

=== Oct to Dec 2021 ===
- As on 6 October, total number of cases in Himachal Pradesh was 219919, including 1477 active cases, 214751 cures and 3674 deaths.
- As on 23 October, total number of cases was 222567, including 1578 active cases, 217256 recoveries and 3718 deaths.
- As on 2 November, total number of cases was 224106, including 1942 active cases, 218410 recoveries and 3738 fatalities.
- As of 14 December, the total number of cases was 228007, including 586 active cases, 223561 cures and 3860 fatalities.
- As of 29 December, the total number of cases was 228653, including 370 active cases, 224410 cures and 3873 deaths.

=== Jan to Mar 2022 ===
- As on 5 January, total number of cases in Himachal Pradesh was 229413, including 859 active cases, 224675 cures and 3879 deaths.
- As on 10 January, total number of cases was 232085, including 3148 active cases, 225055 cures and 3882 fatalities.
- As on 15 January, total number of cases was 242289, including 10653 active cases, 227847 recoveries and 3889 fatalities.
- As on 27 January, total number of cases was 263914, including 11141 active cases, 248812 recoveries and 3961 deaths.
- As on 5 February, total number of cases was 276146, including 6637 active cases, 265477 recoveries and 4032 fatal cases.
- As on 11 February, total number of cases was 279697, including 4132 active cases, 271489 recoveries and 4076 deaths.
- As on 16 February, total number of cases was 281133, including 2533 active cases, 274514 cures and 4086 deaths.
- As on 25 February, total number of cases was 283073, including 1322 active cases, 277637 cures and 4117 fatalities.
- As on 20 March, total number of cases was 284304, including 324 active cases, 279848 recoveries and 4132 deaths.

=== April to June 2022 ===
- As on 11 April, total number of cases in Himachal Pradesh was 284639, including 61 active cases, 280444 cures and 4134 deaths.
- As on 30 April, total number of cases was 284811, including 59 active cases, 280618 recoveries and 4134 deaths.
- As on 11 May, total number of cases was 284896, including 55 active cases, 280705 cures and 4136 deaths.
- As on 15 May, total number of cases was 284938, including 78 active cases, 280724 cures and 4136 deaths.
- As on 28 May, total number of cases in the state was 285034, including 37 active cases, 280859 cures and 4136 fatal cases.
- As on 10 June, total number of cases was 285547, including 213 active cases, 281195 recoveries and 4139 deaths.

=== July to September 2022 ===
- As on 16 July, total number of cases in Himachal Pradesh was 289781, including 2260 active cases, 283323 recoveries and 4198 deaths.
- As on 30 August, total number of cases was 310643, including 1339 active cases, 305105 cures and 4199 deaths.
- As on 7 September, total number of cases was 311471, including 483 active cases, 306786 cures and 4202 fatal cases.
- As on 17 September, total number of cases was 311906, including 269 active cases, 307429 recoveries and 4208 fatalities.
- As on 26 October, total number of cases was 312432, including 225 active cases, 308196 recoveries and 4211 deaths.

== COVID-19 Vaccines with Approval for Emergency or Conditional Usage ==
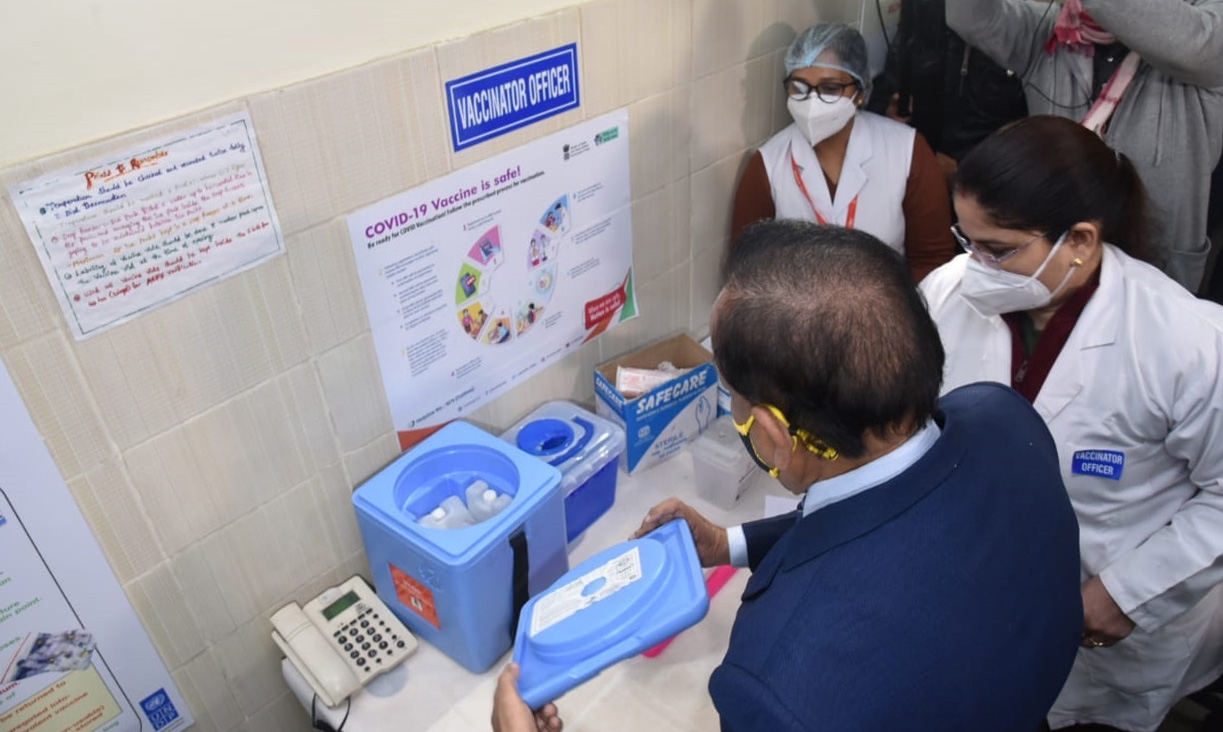
Union Minister for Health & Family Welfare, Dr. Harsh Vardhan visiting the GTB Hospital, Shahdara to review the preparedness of Dry Run of COVID-19 vaccine, in Delhi on January 02, 2021.

=== Covishield ===
On 1 January 2021, the Drug Controller General of India, approved the emergency or conditional use of AstraZeneca's COVID-19 vaccine AZD1222 (marketed as Covishield). Covishield is developed by the University of Oxford and its spin-out company, Vaccitech. It's a viral vector vaccine based on replication-deficient Adenovirus that causes cold in Chimpanzees. It can be stored, transported and handled at normal refrigerated conditions (two-eight degrees Celsius/ 36-46 degrees Fahrenheit). It has a shelf-life of at least six months.

On 12 January 2021 first batches of Covishield vaccine was despatched from the Serum Institute of India.

=== Covaxin ===
On 2 January 2021, BBV152 (marketed as Covaxin), first indigenous vaccine, developed by Bharat Biotech in association with the Indian Council of Medical Research and National Institute of Virology received approval from the Drug Controller General of India for its emergency or conditional usage.

On 14 January 2021 first batches of Covaxin vaccine was despatched from the Bharat Biotech, albeit it was still in the third phase of testing.

=== Others ===
On 19 May 2021, Dr Reddy's Labs received Emergency Use Authorisation for anti-COVID drug 2-DG. On 21 February 2022, Drugs Controller General of India granted approval to Biological E's COVID-19 vaccine Corbevax, that can be used for children between 12 and 18 years of age.

On 21 October 2021, India completed administering of one billion Covid vaccines in the country.

On 8 January 2022, India crossed 1.5 billion Covid vaccines milestone in the country.

On 19 February 2022, India crossed 1.75 billion Covid vaccines milestone in the country.

== See also ==
- COVID-19 pandemic in India
- COVID-19 pandemic in the World
