= COVID-19 pandemic in Lakshadweep =

Details of the global pandemic within the Indian Union Territory

COVID-19 pandemic in the Lakshadweep Islands
- Disease: COVID-19
- Pathogen: SARS-CoV-2
- Location: Lakshadweep Islands, India
- First outbreak: Wuhan, Hubei, China
- Arrival date: 18 January 2021 (5 years and 4 months)
- Confirmed cases: 10,297
- Active cases: 5
- Deaths: 51

The first case of COVID-19 on the Union Territory of Lakshadweep was recorded on 18 January 2021. Lakshadweep Islands, until then, was India's only COVID-free territory (state/UT), and life was fairly normal for the residents of the UT. As of 13 September 2021, there were 10,297 confirmed cases (5 active) and 51 deaths.

== Timeline ==
- As on 19 January, total number of cases in Lakshadweep was 21. All of them are active cases.
- As on 25 January, total number of cases was 67. All of them are active cases.
- As on 3 February, total number of cases was 122, including 61 active cases and 61 recoveries.
- As on 10 February, total number of cases was 178, including 63 active cases and 115 recoveries.
- As of 12 August 2021, there are 40 active cases. jk
- As of 13 September 2021, total number of cases was 10,297, including 5 active cases and 51 deaths.

== COVID-19 vaccines with approval for emergency or conditional usage ==
Two vaccines - University of Oxford’s AZD1222 (marketed as Covishield in India) and BBV152 (marketed as Covaxin, developed in India by Bharat Biotech in association with the ICMR and NIV) were approved by the Drug Controller General of India on 1 and 2 January 2021. Both can be stored, transpedorted and handled at normal refrigerated conditions (2-8 degrees Celsius).

== See also ==
- COVID-19 pandemic in India
- COVID-19 pandemic
