= COVID-19 pandemic in Nagaland =

Ongoing COVID-19 viral pandemic in Nagaland

- Disease: COVID-19
- Pathogen: SARS-CoV-2
- Location: Nagaland
- First outbreak: Wuhan, Hubei
- Index case: Kohima and Dimapur
- Arrival date: 22 May 2020

Government website
- nagahealth.nagaland.gov.in

The COVID-19 pandemic reached the state of Nagaland on 22 May 2020, with its first case confirmed on 25 May 2020. Officially, Nagaland is the last of the northeastern states after Sikkim to report COVID-19 positive cases.

== Timeline ==
=== April 2020 ===
On 22 April, a 33-year-old trader based in Dimapur had tested positive in Gauhati Medical College and Hospital (GMCH).

The man had been admitted to a private hospital in Dimapur for treatment but the hospital referred him to the GMCH as the State did not have testing facilities at that point of time. He tested positive hours after he was shifted in an ambulance.

=== May 2020 ===
- The first special train carrying over 1469 people, who were stranded in Chennai, reached Dimapur at around 6:20 pm on 22 May. The returnees, mostly students and migrant workers, had started their journey from Chennai on 19 May.
- On 25 May, the Nagaland state Department of Health and Family Welfare reported the first official cases in the state — three people – two men and a woman – who returned from Chennai on 22 May tested positive for the novel coronavirus.

=== June 2020 ===
- As of 26 June, the total number of cases in Nagaland was 371, including 209 active cases and 162 recoveries.

=== July 2020 ===
On 20 July, total number of cases in Nagaland crossed 1000 mark.

=== September 2020 ===
- As of 1 September, the total number of cases in Nagaland was 4003, including 794 active cases and 3191 recoveries. Eight people died from the virus.
- On 12 September, Nagaland's total covid cases crossed 5000 mark.
- As of 28 September, the total number of cases was 5957, including 1002 active cases, 4897 recoveries and 12 deaths.

=== October 2020 ===
- As of 4 October, the total number of cases in Nagaland is 6552, including 1221 active cases and 5263 recoveries and 12 deaths.

=== November 2020 ===
- As of November 13, the total number of cases in Nagaland is 9638, including 727 active cases and 8859 recoveries and 52 deaths.
- On 17 November, Nagaland passed a grim milestone of 10000 total covid cases.
- As of November 23, the total number of cases in Nagaland is 10744, including 1442 active cases, 9241 recoveries and 61 deaths.

=== December 2020 ===
- As of December 5, the total number of cases in Nagaland is 11305, including 481 active cases, 10759 recoveries and 65 deaths.

=== January 2021 ===
- As of January 21, the total number of cases in Nagaland is 11928, including 107 active cases, 11733 recoveries and 88 deaths.

=== February 2021 ===
- As of 8 February, the total number of cases in Nagaland was 12009, including 84 active cases, 11837 recoveries and 88 deaths.
- As of 16 February, the total number of cases was 12039, including 41 active cases, 11908 recoveries and 90 deaths.

=== March 2021 ===
- As of 6 March, the total number of cases in Nagaland was 12058, including 15 active cases, 11952 recoveries and 91 deaths.

=== May 2021 ===
- As of 26 May, the total number of cases in Nagaland was 14313, including 4923 active cases, 14929 recoveries and 327 deaths.

== Statistics ==
=== Total confirmed cases, active cases, recoveries and deaths ===
Total confirmed cases Active Cases Recoveries Deaths

View source data.
View source data.

== COVID-19 vaccines with approval for emergency or conditional usage ==
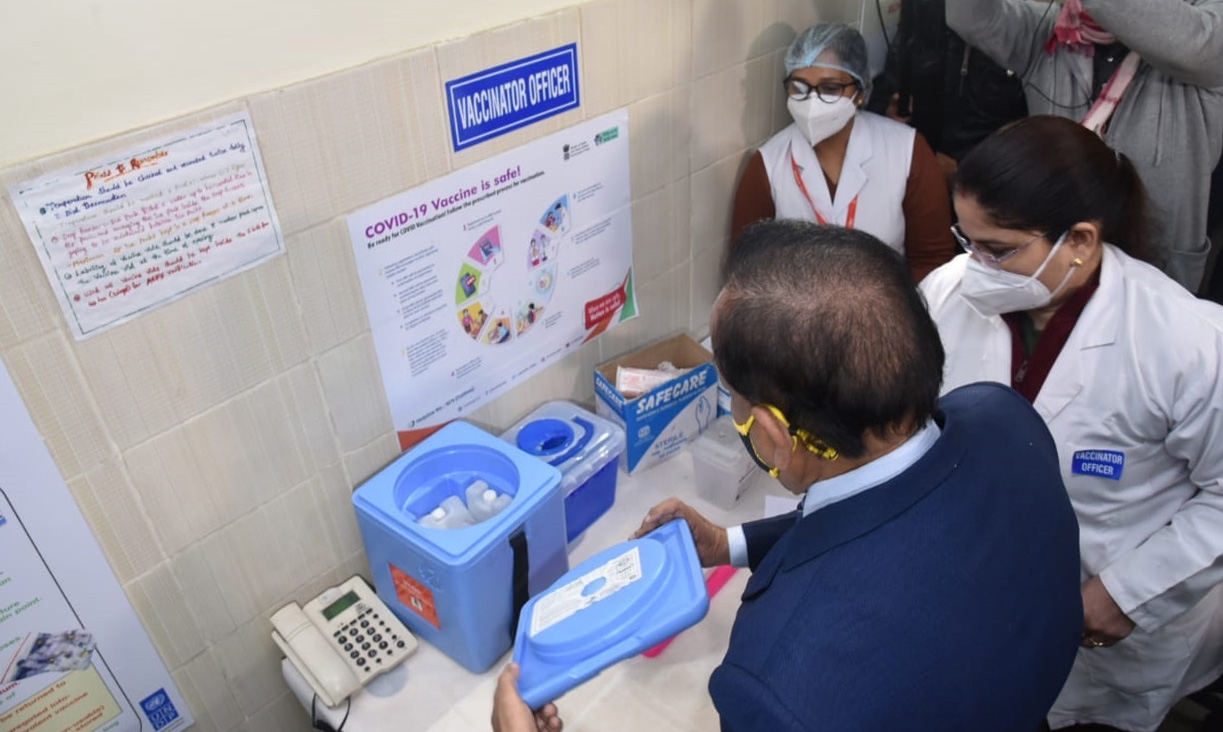
Union Minister for Health & Family Welfare, Dr. Harsh Vardhan visiting the GTB Hospital, Shahdara to review the preparedness of Dry Run of COVID-19 vaccine, in Delhi on January 02, 2021.

Covishield

On January 1, 2021, the Drug Controller General of India, approved the emergency or conditional use of AstraZeneca's COVID-19 vaccine AZD1222 (marketed as Covishield). Covishield is developed by the University of Oxford and its spin-out company, Vaccitech. It's a viral vector vaccine based on replication-deficient Adenovirus that causes cold in Chimpanzees. It can be stored, transported and handled at normal refrigerated conditions (two-eight degrees Celsius/ 36-46 degrees Fahrenheit). It has a shelf life of at least six months.

Covaxin

On January 2, 2021, BBV152 (marketed as Covaxin), first indigenous vaccine, developed by Bharat Biotech in association with the Indian Council of Medical Research and National Institute of Virology received approval from the Drug Controller General of India for its emergency or conditional usage.

== See also ==
- COVID-19 pandemic
- COVID-19 pandemic in India
- COVID-19 pandemic in the World
