= COVID-19 pandemic in Tripura =

Ongoing COVID-19 viral pandemic in Tripura, India

- Disease: COVID-19
- Pathogen: SARS-CoV-2
- Location: Tripura, India
- First outbreak: Wuhan, Hubei, China
- Index case: Chandigarh
- Arrival date: 6 April 2020 (6 years, 4 months, 3 weeks and 6 days)
- Confirmed cases: 1,240 (22 June 2020)
- Active cases: 453 (Note: 4 persons migrated, are not included here)
- Recovered: 782 (22 June 2020)
- Deaths: 1 (9 June 2020)
- Fatality rate: 0.08%

Government website
- COVID-19 dashboard

The first case of the COVID-19 pandemic in India was reported on 30 January 2020, originating from China. Gradually, the pandemic spread to various states and union territories of India. The first case was recorded in this region on 6 April.

== Timeline ==
=== May 2020 ===
- As on 23 May, total number of cases in Tripura was 191, including 39 active cases and 152 recoveries.

=== June 2020 ===
- As on 3 June, total number of cases in Tripura was 520, including 347 active cases and 173 recoveries.
- As on 4 June, total number of cases was 646, including 473 active cases and 173 recoveries.
- As on 7 June, total number of cases was 802, including 610 active cases and 192 recoveries.
- On 12 June, total number of cases reached 1000. This includes 721 active cases and 278 cures. 1 person died due to virus.
- As on 19 June, total number of cases was 1154, including 514 active cases and 639 recoveries. 1 person died due to virus.
- As on 24 June, total number of cases was 1263, including 358 active cases and 904 cures. One person died from the virus.
- As on 29 June, total number of cases in Tripura was 1386, including 264 active cases, 1096 recoveries and 1 death.

=== July 2020 ===
- As on 3 July, total number of cases in Tripura was 1533, including 333 active cases, 1199 cures and 1 death.
- As on 7 July, total number of cases was 1703, including 454 active cases, 1248 recoveries and 1 death.
- As on 15 July, total number of cases was 2281, including 660 active cases and 1604 recoveries. Three persons died from the virus.
- As on 18 July, total number of cases was 2497, including 796 active cases and 1684 recoveries and 3 fatalities.
- As on 25 July, total number of cases was 3864, including 1643 active cases and 2210 recoveries and 11 deaths.
- As on 30 July, total number of cases in Tripura was 4722, including 1721 active cases and 2962 recoveries and 21 deaths.

=== August 2020 ===
- As on 4 August, total number of cases in Tripura was 5502, including 1799 active cases, 3675 cures and 28 deaths.
- As on 7 August, total number of cases was 5868, including 1954 active cases, 3860 recoveries and 36 deaths.
- As on 10 August, total number of cases was 6223, including 1720 active cases, 4443 recoveries and 42 fatalities.
- As on 14 August, total number of cases was 6764, including 1703 active cases, 5015 recoveries and 46 deaths.
- As on 20 August, total number of cases in Tripura was 7850, including 2202 active cases, 5565 recoveries and 65 deaths.
- As on 26 August, total number of cases was 9539, including 2863 active cases, 6574 cures and 83 deaths.
- On 28 August 2020, Tripura crossed grim milestone of 10000 COVID cases.

=== September 2020 ===
- As on 1 September, total number of cases in Tripura was 12719, including 4734 active cases, 7847 cures and 118 deaths.
- As on 6 September, total number of cases was 15526, including 6308 active cases, 9048 recoveries and 149 deaths.
- As on 11 September, total number of cases was 17830, including 7381 active cases, 10255 recoveries and 172 deaths.
- As on 17 September, total number of cases was 20167, including 7495 active cases, 12435 recoveries and 217 fatalities.
- As on 20 September, total number of cases was 22029, including 6980 active cases, 14787 cures and 239 deaths.
- As on 24 September, total number of cases is 23726, including 6551 active cases, 16955 recoveries and 257 deaths.
- As on 29 September, total number of cases is 25350, including 5874 active cases, 19180 recoveries and 273 fatalities.

=== October 2020 ===
- As on 2 October, total number of cases in Tripura was 26359, including 5480 active cases, 20573 cures and 283 deaths.
- As on 4 October, total number of cases was 26871, including 5171 active cases, 21387 cures and 290 deaths.
- As on 8 October, total number of cases was 27733, including 4389 active cases, 23043 cures and 301 deaths.
- As on 15 October, total number of cases is 29028, including 3318 active cases, 25371 recoveries and 316 deaths.
- As on 27 October, total number of cases was 30267, including 1796 active cases, 28130 cures and 341 deaths.

=== November 2020 ===
- As on 8 November, total number of cases in Tripura was 31491, including 1302 active cases, 29835 cures and 354 deaths.
- As on 9 November, total number of cases was 31517, including 1219 active cases, 29942 cures and 356 deaths.
- As on 15 November, total number of cases was 31919, including 1105 active cases, 30455 cures and 359 deaths.
- As on 24 November, total number of cases was 32467, including 827 active cases, 31273 cures and 367 fatalities.
- As on 26 November, total number of cases is 32575, including 767 active cases, 31418 recoveries and 367 fatalities.

=== December 2020 ===
- As on 1 December, total number of cases in Tripura was 32700, including 592 active cases, 31741 recoveries and 367 deaths.
- As on 3 December, total number of cases was 32777, including 552 active cases, 31856 recoveries and 369 fatalities.
- As on 7 December, total number of cases was 32865, including 451 active cases, 32045 cures and 369 deaths.
- As on 14 December, total number of cases was 33022, including 330 active cases, 32319 cures and 373 deaths.
- As on 17 December, total number of cases was 33055, including 306 active cases, 32374 recoveries and 375 deaths.
- As on 21 December, total number of cases was 33149, including 234 active cases, 32538 recoveries and 377 deaths.
- As on 22 December, total number of cases is 33162, including 213 active cases, 32572 recoveries and 377 deaths.
- As on 29 December, total number of cases is 33220, including 140 active cases, 32698 recoveries and 382 deaths.
- As on 31 December, total number of cases is 33238, including 128 active cases, 32728 recoveries and 382 deaths.

=== January 2021 ===
- As on 5 January, total number of cases in Tripura was 33258, including 73 active cases, 32803 recoveries and 382 deaths.
- As on 10 January, total number of cases was 33281, including 57 active cases, 32839 cures and 385 deaths.
- As on 21 January, total number of cases was 33312, including 36 active cases, 32888 cures and 388 deaths.
- As on 27 January, total number of cases was 33320, including 24 active cases, 32908 cures and 388 deaths.

=== February 2021 ===
- As on 1 February, total number of cases in Tripura was 33325, including 19 active cases, 32918 recoveries and 388 deaths.
- As on 7 February, total number of cases in Tripura was 33326, including 8 active cases, 32930 recoveries and 388 deaths. For the first time since April 2020, the state has number of active cases in a single digit.
- As on 11 February, total number of cases in Tripura was 33327, including 5 active cases, 32934 recoveries and 388 deaths.
- As on 14 February, total number of cases in Tripura was 33327, including 2 active cases, 32937 recoveries and 388 deaths.
- As on 23 February, total number of cases in Tripura was 33372, including 45 active cases, 32939 recoveries and 388 deaths.
- In the entire month of February 2021, not even a single death was reported due to Covid.

=== March 2021 ===
- As on 6 March, total number of cases in Tripura was 33398, including 31 active cases, 32979 recoveries and 388 deaths.
- As on 14 March, total number of cases was 33403, including 12 active cases, 33003 recoveries and 388 deaths.
- As on 29 March, total number of cases was 33467, including 49 active cases, 33029 recoveries and 389 fatalities.

=== April 2021 ===
- As on 5 April, total number of cases in Tripura was 33514, including 63 active cases, 33062 recoveries and 389 deaths.
- As on 11 April, total number of cases in Tripura is 33707, including 236 active cases, 33081 recoveries and 390 deaths.

=== May 2021 ===
- As on 5 May, total number of cases in Tripura was 36208, including 1940 active cases, 33871 recoveries and 397 deaths.
- As on 11 May, total number of cases was 38132, including 3098 active cases, 34624 recoveries and 410 deaths.
- As on 12 May, total number of cases was 38548, including 3368 active cases, 34761 cures and 419 deaths.
- As on 18 May, total number of cases was 41871, including 5404 active cases, 36025 recoveries and 442 deaths.
- As on 27 May, total number of cases is 48504, including 7508 active cases, 40497 recoveries and 476 deaths.

=== June 2021 ===
- As on 18 June, total number of cases in Tripura was 61313, including 4910 active cases, 55769 recoveries and 634 deaths.
- As on 23 June, total number of cases is 63114, including 3785 active cases, 58674 recoveries and 655 deaths.

=== July 2021 ===
- As on 13 July, total number of cases in Tripura was 71312, including 4245 active cases, 66290 recoveries and 714 deaths.

=== August 2021 ===
- As on 28 August, total number of cases in Tripura was 82671, including 1090 active cases, 80725 recoveries and 793 deaths.

=== September 2021 ===
- As on 23 September, total number of cases in Tripura was 83953, including 353 active cases, 82731 recoveries and 806 deaths.
- As on 25 September, total number of cases was 84011, including 331 active cases, 82810 cures and 807 deaths.
- As on 29 September, total number of cases was 84102, including 260 active cases, 82970 recoveries and 809 fatalities.

=== Oct to Dec 2021 ===
- As on 7 October, total number of cases in Tripura was 84201, including 154 active cases, 83172 recoveries and 812 deaths.
- As on 24 October, total number of cases is 84381, including 101 active cases, 83404 recoveries and 813 deaths.
- As on 2 November, total number of cases was 84468, including 126 active cases, 83466 recoveries and 813 deaths.
- As on 4 December, total number of cases was 84844, including 88 active cases, 83931 recoveries and 825 deaths.
- As of 14 December, the total number of cases was 84934, including 380 active cases, 84028 cures and 826 fatalities.
- As of 29 December, the total number of cases was 85041, including 73 active cases, 84139 cures and 829 deaths.

=== Jan to Mar 2022 ===
- As on 6 January, total number of cases in Tripura was 85297, including 278 active cases, 84190 recoveries and 829 deaths.
- As on 9 January, total number of cases was 85760, including 650 active cases, 84280 recoveries and 830 deaths.
- As on 16 January, total number of cases was 90935, including 5106 active cases, 84991 recoveries and 838 deaths.
- As on 21 January, total number of cases was 97933, including 8143 active cases, 88922 cures and 868 deaths.
- As on 5 February, total number of cases was 100650, including 887 active cases, 98847 cures and 916 fatal cases.
- As on 12 February, total number of cases was 100790, including 206 active cases, 99665 recoveries and 919 deaths.
- As on 25 February, total number of cases was 100859, including 42 active cases, 99898 cures and 919 deaths.
- As on 19 March, total number of cases was 100870, including 1 active case, 99950 have recovered and 919 deaths.

=== April to June 2022 ===
- As on 13 April, total number of cases in Tripura was 100878, including no active case, 99956 cures and 922 deaths.
- As on 25 April, total number of cases was 100879, including no active case, 99957 cures and 922 deaths.
- As on 2 May, total number of cases was 100881, including 2 active cases, 99957 cures and 922 deaths.
- As on 12 May, total number of cases was 100887, including 5 active cases, 99959 cures and 923 deaths.
- As on 28 May, total number of cases was 100887, including no active case, 99964 cures and 923 deaths. Tripura didn't report any new Covid related case in the last 2 weeks.
- As on 12 June, total number of cases was 100889, including 2 active cases, 99964 cures and 923 deaths.
- As on 22 June, total number of cases was 100894, including 4 active cases, 99967 cures and 923 deaths.

=== July to September 2022 ===
- As on 16 July, total number of cases in Tripura was 102325, including 1284 active cases, 100119 cures and 924 deaths.
- As on 30 August, total number of cases was 107709, including 62 active cases, 106735 cures and 938 deaths.
- As on 10 September, total number of cases was 107743, including 34 active cases, 106797 recoveries and 938 fatal cases.
- As on 24 September, total number of cases was 107771, including 45 active cases, 106814 recoveries and 938 deaths.

== Sample Testing ==
Summary of test results
Samples tested	56,035
Tested Positive	1,240
Tests per million (Note: Population based on 2019 estimates from National Health Mission)	14,037
Percentage Tested Positive	2.21%
As of 22 June 2020

== COVID-19 Vaccines with Approval for Emergency or Conditional Usage ==
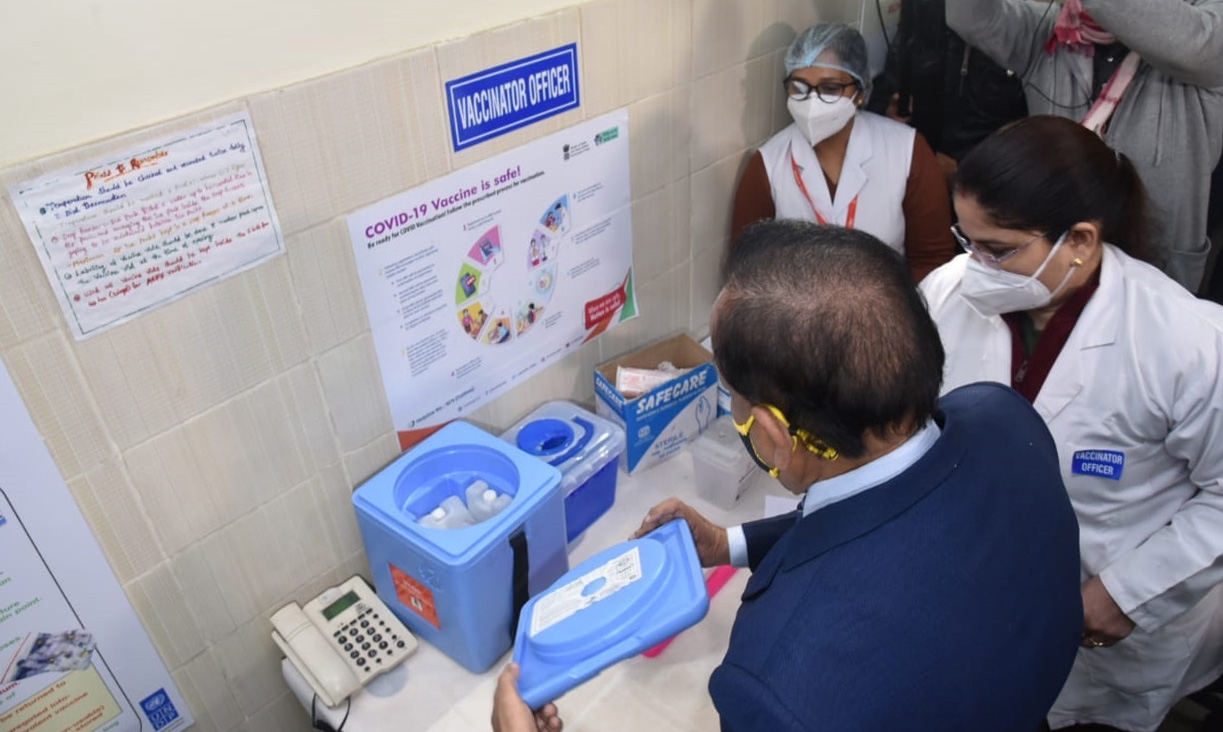
Union Minister for Health & Family Welfare, Dr. Harsh Vardhan visiting the GTB Hospital, Shahdara to review the preparedness of Dry Run of COVID-19 vaccine, in Delhi on January 02, 2021.

=== Covishield ===
On 1 January 2021, the Drug Controller General of India, approved the emergency or conditional use of AstraZeneca's COVID-19 vaccine AZD1222 (marketed as Covishield). Covishield is developed by the University of Oxford and its spin-out company, Vaccitech. It's a viral vector vaccine based on replication-deficient Adenovirus that causes cold in Chimpanzees. It can be stored, transported and handled at normal refrigerated conditions (two-eight degrees Celsius/ 36-46 degrees Fahrenheit). It has a shelf-life of at least six months.

On 12 January 2021 first batches of Covishield vaccine was despatched from the Serum Institute of India.

=== Covaxin ===
On 2 January 2021, BBV152 (marketed as Covaxin), first indigenous vaccine, developed by Bharat Biotech in association with the Indian Council of Medical Research and National Institute of Virology received approval from the Drug Controller General of India for its emergency or conditional usage.

On 14 January 2021 first batches of Covaxin vaccine was despatched from the Bharat Biotech, albeit it was still in the third phase of testing.

=== Others ===
On 19 May 2021, Dr Reddy's Labs received Emergency Use Authorisation for anti-COVID drug 2-DG. On 21 February 2022, Drugs Controller General of India granted approval to Biological E's COVID-19 vaccine Corbevax, that can be used for children between 12 and 18 years of age.

On 21 October 2021, India completed administering of one billion Covid vaccines in the country.

On 8 January 2022, India crossed 1.5 billion Covid vaccines milestone in the country.

On 19 February 2022, India crossed 1.75 billion Covid vaccines milestone in the country.

== See also ==
- COVID-19 pandemic in India
