= Drugs Controller General of India =

Director of CDSCO

- Incumbent; Rajeev Singh Raghuvanshi
- Ministry of Health and Family Welfare
- Constituting instrument: Drugs and Cosmetics Act, 1940
- Deputy: Drugs Controller General of India

Drugs Controller General of India (DCGI) is the head of department of the Central Drugs Standard Control Organization of the Government of India responsible for approval of licences of specified categories of drugs such as blood and blood products, IV fluids, vaccines, and sera in India. Drugs Controller General of India, comes under the Ministry of Health & Family Welfare. DCGI also sets standards for manufacturing, sales, import, and distribution of drugs in India.

== Function ==
DCGI lays down the standard and quality of manufacturing, selling, import and distribution of drugs in India.

- Preparation and maintenance of national reference standard.
- To bring about the uniformity in the enforcement of the Drugs and Cosmetics Act.
- Training of Drug Analysts deputed by State Drug Control Laboratories and other Institutions
- Analysis of Cosmetics received as survey samples from CDSCO (central drug standard control organisation)

With the notification of Medical Device Rules 2017 by the Government of India, DCGI will also act as Central Licensing Authority (CLA) for the medical devices which fall under the purview of these rules. Out of four Classes of medical devices from Class A to Class D, DCGI will be the direct licensing authority for Class C and Class D devices, whereas it will coordinate licensing for Class A and B devices through State drug controllers, who will act as State Licensing Authority or SLA.

== Governance ==
The government on 1 February 2023 appointed Dr. Rajeev Singh Raghuvanshi as Drug Controller General of India. The government earlier on 14 August 2019 appointed Dr. VG Somani as Drug Controller General of India (DCGI). Dr. VG Somani succeeded S Eswara Reddy, the interim DCGI who was appointed in February 2018. DCGI heads the Indian drug regulatory body the Central Drugs Standard Control Organisation (CDSCO), whose functions include ensuring the quality of drugs and cosmetics sold in the country, approval of new drugs and regulating clinical trials.

== Zonal Offices Of CDSCO ==
The central government have established 6 zonal offices of CDSCO (Central Drugs Standard Control Organisation) at Mumbai, Kolkata, Chennai, and Ghaziabad, Hyderabad, Ahmedabad, various Sub-Zonal offices and Port offices, which works in close collaboration with the state control administration and assist them in securing uniform enforcement of the Drug Act.
