= The Vaccine War =

2023 Hindi film by Vivek Agnihotri

- Theatrical release poster
- Directed by: Vivek Agnihotri
- Based on: Going Viral by Balram Bhargava
- Produced by: Pallavi Joshi
- Starring: Nana Patekar; Anupam Kher; Pallavi Joshi; Raima Sen; Sapthami Gowda; Girija Oak; Mohan Kapoor
- Cinematography: Udaysingh Mohite
- Edited by: Shankh Rajadhyaksha
- Music by: Songs: Rohit Sharma; Vanraj Bhatia; Swapnil Bandodkar; Shryea Kaul; Background Score: Rohit Sharma
- Production company: I Am Buddha Entertainment and Media LLP
- Distributed by: Pen Marudhar Cine Entertainment
- Release date: 28 September 2023
- Running time: 161 minutes
- Country: India
- Language: Hindi
- Budget: est.₹10 crore
- Box office: est.₹9.47 crore

The Vaccine War is a 2023 Indian Hindi-language medical docudrama film directed by Vivek Agnihotri and produced by Pallavi Joshi. It tells about the development of Covaxin during the COVID-19 pandemic in India, shedding light on the efforts of scientists involved in its creation. It is based on the book "Going Viral" by Prof Balram Bhargava of Indian Council of Medical Research.

The film features Nana Patekar, Pallavi Joshi, Raima Sen, Anupam Kher, Girija Oak, Nivedita Bhattacharya, Sapthami Gowda, and Mohan Kapur. The Vaccine War was theatrically released on 28 September 2023. The Film received mixed reviews from critics mostly negative. Against its ₹10 crore (US$1.0 million) budget, the film collected ₹9.47 crore (US$980,000) worldwide and became a box office bomb. It was featured at the 54th IFFI Indian panorama section where it received a standing ovation.

== Plot ==
Scientists at the Indian biomedical lab roll out an indigenous vaccine at the height of the COVID-19 pandemic in the race against time. The Director General of ICMR Dr. Balram Bhargava spearheads the vaccine development project. A high level expert committee is set-up by the Ministry of Health and Family Welfare, ICMR, and Bharat Biotech.

A scientific team of bioengineers led by Dr. Priya Abraham, Director of ICMR-National Institute of Virology, consists of Virologists Dr. Sreelekshmy Mohandas, Dr. Nivedita Gupta, and Dr. Pragya Yadav; Epidemiologists and Infectious Disease Scientists Dr. Rajni Kant Srivastava, Dr. Raman Gangakhedkar, Dr. Samiran Panda, Dr. Varsha Potdar and Dr. Enna Dogra Gupta.

The SARS-CoV-2 strain (NIV-2020-770) used in developing the BBV152 vaccine is retrieved from tourists who arrive in New Delhi, India. The scientific team sequences the ‘Vero CCL-81’ cells and the genome sequence is deposited in the GISAID database. The team then reports the development of an inactivated whole-virion SARS-CoV-2 vaccine BBV152, which elicits a neutralizing antibody response in animal studies, and phase I clinical trial against hCoV-19/India/2020770.

== Cast ==
- Nana Patekar as Dr. Balram Bhargava, Director-General of Indian Council of Medical Research
- Pallavi Joshi as Dr. Priya Abraham, Director of ICMR-National Institute of Virology
- Raima Sen as Rohini Singh Dhulia, Science Editor at The Daily Wire
- Sapthami Gowda as Dr. Sreelekshmy Mohandas, Scientist at ICMR-NIV
- Anupam Kher as Cabinet Secretary
- Girija Oak as Dr. Nivedita Gupta, Head of Virology Dept. at ICMR
- Nivedita Bhattacharya as Dr. Pragya Yadav, Scientist at ICMR-NIV
- Mohan Kapur as Dr. Raman Gangakhedkar, Head and Scientist of Epidemiology and Communicable Disease Division at ICMR
- Anchal Dwivedi as Dr. Enna Dogra Gupta, Scientist at ICMR
- Arvind Paswan as Dr. Rajni Kant Srivastava Sr. Deputy Director-General of ICMR
- Mayukh as Dr. Samiran Panda, Head and Scientist of Epidemiology and Communicable Disease Division at ICMR (Also Director of ICMR-NARI)
- Deepjyoti Das as Editor
- Vrinda Kher as Dr. Varsha Potdar, Scientist and Sr. Research Officer at ICMR-NIV
- Suhita Thatte as House help of Rohini Singh Dhulia
- Benny Brown as Security Guard Bahadur
- Manas Gupta as Gardener's Son
- Divya Seth as Dr. Bhargava's wife
- Reuben Israel as Dr. Priya Abraham's husband
- Arjun Dwivedi as Dr. Sanjay Yadav
- Asheesh Kapur as Vikas Gupta
- Aarav Shukla as Dr. Pragya Yadav's son
- Kavya Goel as Dr. Pragya Yadav's daughter
- Rudra Choudhary as Dr. Nivedita Gupta's son
- Nitant Trivedi as Dr. Nivedita Gupta's son
- Dheeraj Sharma as Professor Vijay Raghavan

== Production ==
The film was announced in November 2022, last schedule started in June 2023 and the shoot wrapped up on 13 August 2023.

== Release ==
=== Theatrical ===
The theatrical release date was announced via teaser on the 77th Independence Day of India. The film will be released on 28 September 2023. Earlier it was set to be released on 15 August 2023 and then 24 October 2023. It is planned to be released in eleven Indian languages including Hindi, English, Bengali, Marathi, Telugu, Tamil, Kannada, Punjabi, Malayalam, Gujarati and Bhojpuri.

The official trailer was released on 12 September 2023. The Vaccine War was marketed as "India's first bio-science film". The film was theatrically released on 28 September 2023.

The films digital streaming rights was sold to Disney+ Hotstar for ₹35 crore. The film was premiered on the platform on 24 November 2023.

== Music ==
The Vaccine War

Soundtrack album by Rohit Sharma, Vanraj Bhatia, Swapnil Bandodkar and Shryea Kaul
- Released: 24 September 2023
- Recorded: 2022
- Genre: Feature film soundtrack
- Length: 17:31
- Language: Hindi
- Label: Zee Music Company

Official audio
- The Vaccine War - Full Album on YouTube

The music of the film is composed by Rohit Sharma, Vanraj Bhatia, Swapnil Bandodkar and Shryea Kaul while lyrics written by Vasant Dev and Shryea Kaul.

Track listing
No.	Title	Lyrics	Music	Singer(s)	Length
1.	"The Vaccine War Theme"	-	Rohit Sharma	-	2:51
2.	"The Vaccine War Theme" (Reprise)	-	Rohit Sharma	-	2:37
3.	"Nasadiya Sukta"	Vasant Dev	Vanraj Bhatia	Rahul Chitnis, Vivek Naik, Nitin Karandikar, Sagar Lele, Gaurang Govind Kulkarni, Shrikant Bhausaheb Kulkarni, Tanmay Prabhakar Pandit, Rudra Desai, Adamya Wakhle, Chinmay Vinayak, Abeer Chowdhary, Veena Joshi, Sonal Naik	3:56
4.	"Nasadiya Sukta" (Rock Version)	Vasant Dev	Vanraj Bhatia, Swapnil Bandodkar	Swapnil Bandodkar	4:57
5.	"After The Rain"	Shryea Kaul	Shryea Kaul	Shryea Kaul	3:30
Total length:					17:31

== Reception ==
=== Critical reception ===
The Vaccine War garnered mixed reviews from the critics.

Mudit Bhatnagar of Times Now rating it 3.5/5, praising its blend of science and emotion. Reviewing the film, Shalini Langer of The Indian Express rated the film with 2.5 out of 5 stars and wrote "Vivek Agnihotri's devotion to his subject – with obviously the government's full cooperation and access – veers the film often towards the look and feel of a public service broadcast". Zinia Bandyopadhyay of India Today rated the film with 2.5 out of 5 stars and wrote "watching the film might give the impression that the entire industry made it their mission to undermine the vaccine and the dedicated scientists behind it." Renuka Vyavahare of The Times of India rated the film with 2.5 out of 5 stars and wrote "Nana Patekar is outstanding but the film reduces itself to being a government mouthpiece parading as a medical drama." Venkat Arikatla of Greatandhra gave a rating of 1.5 out of 5, calling it an overdose of propagandist torture. He stated, what the film does is malign those journalists who rightly questioned the ruling party's grand claims of being capable of producing the vaccine.

The film is also reviewed by Manoj Kumar and Manish Sachan in Media Asia, Anuj Kumar of The Hindu, Nandini Ramnath of Scroll.in, Monika Rawal Kukreja of Hindustan Times, Guruprasad D. N. of Deccan Herald, Avinash Ramachandran of Cinema Express, Pooja Biraia Jaiswal of The Week, Garima Sadhwani and Pratikshy Mishra of The Quint, Mayur Sanap of Rediff.com, and Lachmi Deb Roy of Firstpost.

=== Box office ===
On its opening day, The Vaccine War collected a total India net of ₹0.70 crore (US$73,000).

The Vaccine War has grossed ₹7.14 crore (US$740,000) in India, with a further ₹2.33 crore (US$240,000) in overseas, for a worldwide total of ₹9.47 crore (US$980,000).
