= COVID-19 pandemic in the Andaman and Nicobar Islands =

Ongoing COVID-19 viral pandemic in the Andaman and Nicobar Islands, India

- Disease: COVID-19
- Pathogen: SARS-CoV-2
- Location: Andaman and Nicobar Islands, India
- First outbreak: Wuhan, Hubei, China
- Arrival date: 26 March 2020 (6 years, 5 months and 1 week)
- Confirmed cases: 6,398 (10 May 2021)
- Active cases: 195
- Recovered: 6,125 (10 May 2021)
- Deaths: 78 (10 May 2021)
- Fatality rate: 1.22%

The first case of the COVID-19 pandemic in India was reported on 30 January 2020, originating from China. Slowly, the pandemic spread to various states and union territories including the union territory of Andaman and Nicobar Islands. The first case was recorded in this region on 26 March 2020. The islands have pursued a strategy of zero COVID-19 transmission, which, except for three flareups in August 2020, May 2021, and January 2022, which were swiftly contained, have resulted in no community outbreaks. The islands have successfully managed the outbreaks, and the union territory has the lowest case count of any region of India, both in total cases and infection rate.

== Timeline ==
=== May 2020 ===
- As on 23 May 2020, total number of cases in Andaman and Nicobar Islands was 33. There are no active cases, as all 33 have successfully recovered from the virus.

=== June 2020 ===
- As on 11 June 2020, total number of cases in Andaman and Nicobar Islands was 38. There are 5 active cases and 33 have successfully recovered from the virus.
- As on 23 June 2020, total number of cases in Andaman and Nicobar Islands was 50. There are 10 active cases and 40 have successfully recovered from the virus.
- As on 26 June 2020, total number of cases in Andaman and Nicobar Islands was 72. There are 29 active cases and 43 have been cured.
- As on 29 June 2020, total number of cases in Andaman and Nicobar Islands was 90. There are 45 active cases and 45 have been cured.

=== July 2020 ===
- As on 3 July 2020, total number of cases in Andaman and Nicobar Islands was 116. There are 65 active cases and 51 have recovered.
- As on 7 July 2020, total number of cases was 147. There are 73 active cases and 74 have recovered.
- As on 15 July 2020, total number of cases in the UT was 176. There are 46 active cases and 130 have recovered.
- As on 19 July 2020, total number of cases was 202. There are 57 active cases and 145 recoveries.
- As on 26 July 2020, total number of cases was 317. There are 137 active cases and 180 cures.

=== August 2020 ===
- As on 1 August 2020, total number of cases in Andaman and Nicobar Islands was 635. There are 402 active cases, 226 have recovered and 7 have died from the virus.
- As on 5 August 2020, total number of cases was 928. There are 639 active cases, 277 have been cured and 12 have died from the virus.
- As on 8 August 2020, total number of cases was 1222. There are 778 active cases, 425 cures and 19 fatalities.
- As on 12 August 2020, total number of cases in the UT was 1900. There are 1050 active cases, 829 have recovered and 21 deaths.
- As on 18 August, total number of cases was 2529. There are 1078 active cases, 1421 cures and 30 deaths.
- As on 23 August, total number of cases was 2860. There are 864 active cases, 1963 cures and 33 fatalities.
- As on 25 August, total number of cases was 2945, including 677 active cases, 2231 recoveries and 37 fatalities.

=== September 2020 ===
- As on 1 September 2020, total number of cases in Andaman and Nicobar Islands was 3160. There are 400 active cases, 2714 have recovered and 46 have died.
- As on 2 September 2020, total number of cases in the UT was 3186. This includes 381 active cases, 2758 recoveries and 47 deaths.
- As on 6 September 2020, total number of cases was 3332. This includes 331 active cases, 2951 recoveries and 50 deaths.
- As on 7 September 2020, total number of cases was 3359, including 312 active cases, 2997 recoveries and 50 deaths.
- As on 11 September 2020, total number of cases was 3494, including 286 active cases, 3157 cures and 51 deaths.
- As on 12 September 2020, total number of cases was 3521, including 268 active cases, 3202 cures and 51 deaths.
- As on 16 September 2020, total number of cases in the UT was 3593. This includes 196 active cases, 3345 recoveries and 52 deaths.
- As on 19 September 2020, total number of cases was 3644, including 156 active cases, 3436 cures and 52 deaths.
- As on 20 September 2020, total number of cases was 3651, including 148 active cases, 3451 recoveries and 52 deaths.
- As on 21 September 2020, total number of cases was 3673, including 152 active cases, 3469 cures and 52 deaths.
- As on 28 September 2020, total number of cases was 3803, including 168 active cases, 3582 recoveries and 53 deaths.

=== October 2020 ===
- As on 2 October 2020, total number of cases in Andaman and Nicobar Islands was 3858. There are 174 active cases, 3631 have recovered and 53 have died.
- As on 3 October 2020, total number of cases was 3868. There are 173 active cases, 3642 have recovered and 53 have died.
- As on 4 October 2020, total number of cases was 3884. There are 182 active cases, 3649 cures and 53 fatalities.
- As on 5 October 2020, total number of cases was 3899. There are 186 active cases, 3659 cures and 54 deaths.
- As on 10 October 2020, total number of cases was 3992, including 193 active cases, 3744 recoveries and 55 deaths.
- As on 13 October 2020, total number of cases was 4036, including 199 active cases, 3782 cures and 55 fatalities.
- As on 19 October 2020, total number of cases was 4126, including 178 active cases, 3892 cures and 56 deaths.
- As on 20 October 2020, total number of cases was 4141, including 183 active cases, 3902 recoveries and 56 deaths.
- As on 25 October 2020, total number of cases in the UT was 4245, including 204 active cases, 3983 recoveries and 58 deaths.
- As on 27 October 2020, total number of cases was 4274. There are 197 active cases, 4019 have recovered and 58 have died.
- As on 30 October 2020, total number of cases was 4317. There are 182 active cases, 4076 have recovered and 59 deaths.

=== November 2020 ===
- As on 8 November 2020, total number of cases in Andaman and Nicobar Islands was 4450. There are 169 active cases, 4221 recoveries and 60 have died.
- As on 14 November 2020, total number of cases was 4527. There are 151 active cases, 4315 recoveries and 61 have died.
- As on 23 November 2020, total number of cases was 4656, including 142 active cases, 4453 recoveries and 61 deaths.
- As on 26 November 2020, total number of cases is 4682, including 130 active cases, 4491 recoveries and 61 fatalities.
- As on 29 November 2020, total number of cases was 4704, including 106 active cases, 4537 cures and 61 fatalities.

=== December 2020 ===
- As on 3 December 2020, total number of cases in Andaman and Nicobar Islands was 4729. There are 71 active cases, 4597 recoveries and 61 have died.
- As on 5 December 2020, total number of cases was 4747. There are 70 active cases, 4616 cures and 61 have died.
- As on 13 December 2020, total number of cases was 4818. There are 84 active cases, 4673 cures and 61 fatalities.
- As on 15 December 2020, total number of cases was 4842, including 93 active cases, 4688 recoveries and 61 fatalities.
- As on 20 December 2020, total number of cases was 4881, including 88 active cases, 4732 recoveries and 61 deaths.
- As on 22 December 2020, total number of cases was 4893, including 82 active cases, 4749 recoveries and 62 deaths.
- As on 23 December 2020, total number of cases was 4896, including 73 active cases, 4761 cures and 62 deaths.
- As on 27 December 2020, total number of cases was 4924, including 64 active cases, 4798 cures and 62 fatalities.
- As on 31 December 2020, total number of cases in the UT was 4945, including 57 active cases, 4826 cures and 62 fatalities.

=== January 2021 ===
- As on 5 January, total number of cases in Andaman and Nicobar Islands was 4949. There are 31 active cases, 4856 recoveries and 62 deaths.
- As on 10 January, total number of cases was 4960, including 23 active cases, 4875 cures and 62 deaths.
- As on 18 January, total number of cases was 4988, including 29 active cases, 4897 recoveries and 62 fatalities.
- As on 19 January, total number of cases was 4989, including 30 active cases, 4897 recoveries and 62 fatalities.
- As on 24 January, total number of cases in the UT was 4993, including 23 active cases, 4908 recoveries and 62 deaths.
- As on 28 January, total number of cases was 4994, including 8 active cases, 4924 recoveries and 62 fatalities.

=== February 2021 ===
- As on 1 February, total number of cases in Andaman and Nicobar Islands was 4994. including 4932 recoveries and 62 deaths.
- As on 7 February, total number of cases in the UT was 5000, including 6 active cases, 4932 recoveries and 62 deaths.
- As on 20 February, total number of cases in the UT was 5014, including 3 active cases, 4949 recoveries and 62 deaths.

=== March 2021 ===
- As on 6 March, total number of cases in Andaman and Nicobar Islands was 5024, including 7 active cases, 4955 recoveries and 62 deaths.
- As on 22 March, total number of cases in the UT was 5039, including 8 active cases, 4969 recoveries and 62 deaths.
- As on 29 March, total number of cases was 5052, including 14 active cases, 4976 recoveries and 62 deaths.

=== April 2021 ===
- As on 4 April, total number of cases in Andaman and Nicobar Islands was 5109, including 57 active cases, 4990 recoveries and 62 deaths.
- As on 11 April, total number of cases is 5175, including 75 active cases, 5038 recoveries and 62 deaths.

=== May 2021 ===
- As on 7 May, total number of cases in Andaman and Nicobar Islands was 6311, including 209 active cases, 6030 recoveries and 72 deaths.
- As on 11 May, total number of cases was 6426, including 199 active cases, 6149 cures and 78 deaths.
- As on 17 May, total number of cases was 6638, including 220 active cases, 6329 recoveries and 89 deaths.
- As on 26 May, total number of cases was 6901, including 220 active cases, 6573 recoveries and 108 deaths.

=== June 2021 ===
- As on 17 June, total number of cases in Andaman and Nicobar Islands was 7335, including 104 active cases, 7104 recoveries and 127 deaths.
- As on 23 June, total number of cases was 7438, including 101 active cases, 7210 recoveries and 127 deaths.

=== July 2021 ===
- As on 13 July, total number of cases in Andaman and Nicobar Islands was 7496, including 9 active cases, 7358 recoveries and 129 deaths.

=== August 2021 ===
- As on 28 August, total number of cases in Andaman and Nicobar Islands was 7560, including 3 active cases, 7428 recoveries and 129 deaths.

=== September 2021 ===
- As on 23 September, total number of cases in Andaman and Nicobar Islands was 7615, including 20 active cases, 7466 cures and 129 deaths.
- As on 26 September, total number of cases in the UT was 7618, including 16 active cases, 7473 recoveries and 129 deaths.

=== Oct to Dec 2021 ===
- As on 7 October, total number of cases in Andaman and Nicobar Islands was 7627, including 10 active cases, 7488 cures and 129 deaths.
- As on 23 October, total number of cases was 7648, including 8 active cases, 7511 recoveries and 129 deaths.
- As on 2 November, total number of cases was 7651, including 4 active cases, 7518 cures and 129 deaths.
- As on 28 November, total number of cases was 7680, including 5 active cases, 7546 cures and 129 deaths.
- As on 4 December, total number of cases was 7688, including 8 active cases, 7551 cures and 129 deaths.
- As on 29 December, total number of cases was 7716, including 8 active cases, 7579 cures and 129 deaths.

=== Jan to Mar 2022 ===
- As on 5 January, total number of cases in Andaman and Nicobar Islands was 7799, including 74 active cases, 7596 cures and 129 deaths.
- As on 15 January, total number of cases in the UT was 8581, including 463 active cases, 7989 cures and 129 deaths.
- As on 22 January, total number of cases was 9277, including 564 active cases, 8584 cures and 129 fatal cases.
- As on 25 January, total number of cases was 9522, including 574 active cases, 8819 recoveries and 129 deaths.
- As on 5 February, total number of cases was 9896, including 214 active cases, 9553 cures and 129 deaths.
- As on 11 February, total number of cases was 9961, including 169 active cases, 9663 cures and 129 fatalities.
- As on 27 February, total number of cases was 10017, including 10 active cases, 9878 recoveries and 129 deaths.
- As on 19 March, total number of cases was 10029, including 4 active cases, 9896 cures and 129 deaths.

=== Apr to Jun 2022 ===
- As on 7 April, total number of cases in Andaman and Nicobar Islands was 10034, including 1 active case, 9904 cures and 129 deaths.
- As on 15 April, total number of cases was 10034, including no active case, 9905 cures and 129 deaths.
- As on 1 May, total number of cases was 10035, including no active case, 9906 recoveries and 129 fatal cases.
- As on 11 May, total number of cases in the UT was 10039, including 3 active cases, 9907 recoveries and 129 deaths.
- As on 28 May, total number of cases was 10043, including 3 active cases, 9911 cures and 129 deaths.
- As on 10 June, total number of cases was 10053, including 5 active cases, 9919 cures and 129 deaths.
- As on 22 June, total number of cases in the UT was 10108, including 34 active cases, 9945 cures and 129 deaths.

=== July to September 2022 ===
- As on 8 July, total number of cases in Andaman and Nicobar Islands was 10224, including 40 active cases, 10055 cures and 129 deaths.
- As on 16 July, total number of cases was 10308, including 57 active cases, 10122 recoveries and 129 deaths.
- As on 26 August, total number of cases was 10592, including 29 active cases, 10434 cures and 129 fatal cases.
- As on 31 August, total number of cases was 10607, including 29 active cases, 10461 recoveries and 129 fatal cases.
- As on 10 September, total number of cases was 10624, including 10 active cases, 10485 cures and 129 deaths.
- As on 24 September, total number of cases was 10663, including 25 active cases, 10509 recoveries and 129 deaths.

== COVID-19 Vaccines with Approval for Emergency or Conditional Usage ==
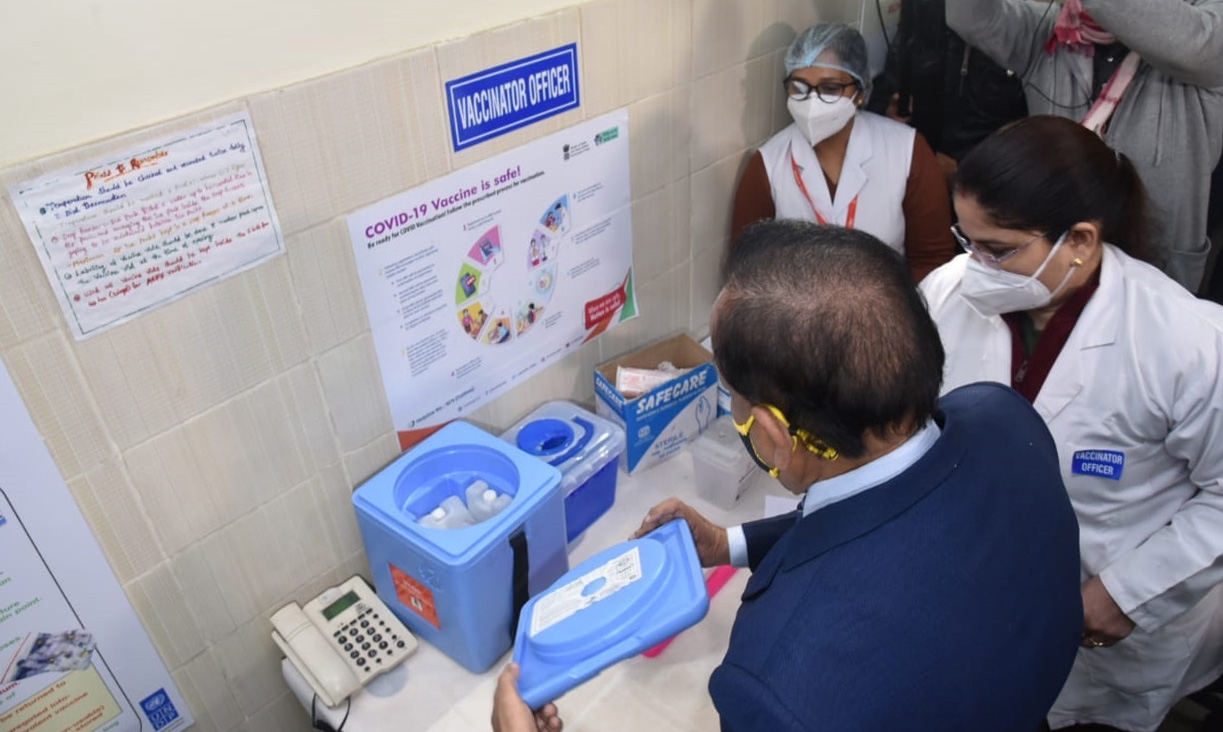
Union Minister for Health & Family Welfare, Dr. Harsh Vardhan visiting the GTB Hospital, Shahdara to review the preparedness of Dry Run of COVID-19 vaccine, in Delhi on January 02, 2021.

=== Covishield ===
On 1 January 2021, the Drug Controller General of India, approved the emergency or conditional use of AstraZeneca's COVID-19 vaccine AZD1222 (marketed as Covishield). Covishield is developed by the University of Oxford and its spin-out company, Vaccitech. It's a viral vector vaccine based on replication-deficient Adenovirus that causes cold in Chimpanzees. It can be stored, transported and handled at normal refrigerated conditions (two-eight degrees Celsius/ 36-46 degrees Fahrenheit). It has a shelf-life of at least six months.

On 12 January 2021 first batches of Covishield vaccine was despatched from the Serum Institute of India.

=== Covaxin ===
On 2 January 2021, BBV152 (marketed as Covaxin), first indigenous vaccine, developed by Bharat Biotech in association with the Indian Council of Medical Research and National Institute of Virology received approval from the Drug Controller General of India for its emergency or conditional usage.

On 14 January 2021 first batches of Covaxin vaccine was despatched from the Bharat Biotech, albeit it was still in the third phase of testing.

=== Others ===
On 19 May 2021, Dr Reddy's Labs received Emergency Use Authorisation for anti-COVID drug 2-DG. On 21 February 2022, Drugs Controller General of India granted approval to Biological E's COVID-19 vaccine Corbevax, that can be used for children between 12 and 18 years of age.

On 21 October 2021, India completed administering of one billion Covid vaccines in the country.

On 8 January 2022, India crossed 1.5 billion Covid vaccines milestone in the country.

On 19 February 2022, India crossed 1.75 billion Covid vaccines milestone in the country.

== See also ==
- COVID-19 pandemic in India
- COVID-19 pandemic
