= COVID-19 pandemic in Puducherry =

Ongoing COVID-19 viral pandemic in Puducherry, India

- Disease: COVID-19
- Pathogen: SARS-CoV-2
- Location: Puducherry, India
- First outbreak: Wuhan, Hubei, China
- Index case: Mahé
- Arrival date: 17 March 2020 (6 years, 8 months and 4 days)
- Confirmed cases: 176 (13 June 2020)
- Active cases: 93
- Recovered: 80 (13 June 2020)
- Deaths: 3 (12 June 2020)
- Fatality rate: 1.7%

Government website
- covid19dashboard.py.gov.in

The first case of the COVID-19 pandemic in India was reported on 30 January 2020, originating from China. Slowly, the pandemic spread to various states and union territories including the union territory of Puducherry. The first case was recorded in this region on 17 March.

== Timeline ==
=== May 2020 ===
- As of 28 May, the total number of reported cases in Puducherry was 53, including 37 active cases and 16 cured or recovered cases.

=== June 2020 ===
- As on 7 June, total number of cases in Puducherry was 128, including 75 active cases and 53 recoveries.
- As on 12 June, total number of cases in Puducherry was 163, including 84 active cases and 76 recoveries and 3 deaths.
- As on 20 June, total number of cases in Puducherry was 338, including 200 active cases and 131 cures and 7 deaths.
- As on 23 June, total number of cases in Puducherry was 402, including 228 active cases and 165 cures and 9 deaths.
- On 26 June, total number of cases in Puducherry crossed 500. It was 502, including 306 active cases and 187 recoveries and 9 fatalities.

=== July 2020 ===
- As on 2 July, total number of cases in Puducherry was 802, including 459 active cases and 331 recoveries and 12 fatalities.
- On 7 July, Puducherry reached a grim milestone of 1000 total covid cases.
- As on 8 July, total number of cases was 1200, including 565 active cases and 619 recoveries and 16 deaths.
- As on 16 July, total number of cases was 1743, including 774 active cases and 947 cures and 22 deaths.
- As on 18 July, total number of cases in the UT was 1890, including 800 active cases and 1062 cures and 28 fatalities.
- As on 26 July, total number of cases in the UT was 2787, including 1102 active cases and 1645 recoveries and 40 fatalities.

=== August 2020 ===
- As on 1 August, total number of cases in Puducherry was 3606, including 1357 active cases and 2198 cures and 51 fatalities.
- As on 3 August, total number of cases was 3982, including 1515 active cases and 2411 cures and 56 deaths.
- As on 9 August, total number of cases was 5123, including 1989 active cases and 3054 recoveries and 80 deaths.
- As on 11 August, total number of cases was 5900, including 2277 active cases and 3532 cures and 91 deaths.
- As on 14 August, total number of cases was 7354, including 3024 active cases and 4224 cures and 106 deaths.
- As on 19 August, total number of cases in the UT was 8752, including 3311 active cases and 5312 cures and 129 fatalities.
- On 22 August 2020, Puducherry crossed grim milestone of 10000 COVID cases.
- As on 23 August, total number of cases was 10859, including 3753 active cases and 6942 cures and 164 deaths.
- As on 25 August, total number of cases was 11426, including 3981 active cases and 7273 cures and 172 deaths.
- As on 30 August, total number of cases was 14127, including 4938 active cases and 8968 recoveries and 221 deaths.

=== September 2020 ===
- As on 2 September, total number of cases in Puducherry was 15157, including 4936 active cases and 9968 cures and 253 fatalities.
- As on 6 September, total number of cases was 17032, including 5046 active cases and 11632 recoveries and 314 deaths.
- As on 10 September, total number of cases was 18536, including 4794 active cases and 13389 recoveries and 353 deaths.
- On 14 September, Puducherry crossed grim milestone of 20000 Covid cases.
- As on 16 September, total number of cases was 21111, including 4770 active cases and 15923 cures and 418 deaths.
- As on 21 September, total number of cases in the UT was 23191, including 4659 active cases and 18065 recoveries and 467 deaths.
- As on 29 September, total number of cases was 27066, including 4933 active cases and 21616 recoveries and 517 deaths.

=== October 2020 ===
- As on 3 October, total number of cases in Puducherry was 28752, including 4874 active cases and 23344 recoveries and 534 fatalities.
- As on 6 October, total number of cases was 29682, including 4522 active cases and 24614 cures and 546 fatalities.
- As on 11 October, total number of cases was 31549, including 4695 active cases and 26291 cures and 563 fatalities.
- As on 20 October, total number of cases was 33452, including 4101 active cases and 28774 cures and 577 fatalities.
- As on 27 October, total number of cases was 34482, including 3741 active cases and 30153 cures and 588 fatalities.

=== November 2020 ===
- As on 8 November, total number of cases in Puducherry was 35838, including 1170 active cases and 34067 recoveries and 601 fatalities.
- As on 15 November, total number of cases is 36324, including 984 active cases and 34732 recoveries and 608 deaths.
- As on 23 November, total number of cases in the UT is 36718, including 527 active cases and 35582 recoveries and 609 deaths.

=== December 2020 ===
- As on 2 December, total number of cases in Puducherry was 37079, including 432 active cases and 36035 recoveries and 612 fatalities.
- As on 7 December, total number of cases was 37270, including 392 active cases and 36263 recoveries and 615 deaths.
- As on 15 December, total number of cases was 37550, including 296 active cases and 36633 cures and 621 deaths.
- As on 21 December, total number of cases was 37762, including 332 active cases and 36803 cures and 627 deaths.
- As on 28 December, total number of cases in the UT was 38028, including 357 active cases and 37040 cures and 631 deaths.
- As on 31 December, total number of cases was 38132, including 384 active cases and 37115 cures and 633 deaths.

=== January 2021 ===
- As on 5 January, total number of cases in Puducherry was 38300, including 373 active cases and 37292 recoveries and 635 deaths.
- As on 10 January, total number of cases was 38455, including 316 active cases and 37501 recoveries and 638 deaths.
- As on 18 January, total number of cases was 38669, including 286 active cases and 37740 recoveries and 643 fatalities.
- As on 22 January, total number of cases was 38794, including 294 active cases and 37857 cures and 643 fatalities.

=== February 2021 ===
- As on 1 February, total number of cases in Puducherry was 39096, including 285 active cases and 38160 recoveries and 651 deaths.
- As on 10 February, total number of cases was 39372, including 293 active cases and 38423 cures and 656 deaths.
- As on 16 February, total number of cases was 39488, including 213 active cases and 38617 cures and 658 deaths.
- As on 20 February, total number of cases was 39569, including 188 active cases and 38719 recoveries and 662 fatalities.
- As on 23 February, total number of cases was 39628, including 179 active cases and 38784 cures and 665 fatalities.

=== March 2021 ===
- As on 6 March, total number of cases in Puducherry was 39843, including 173 active cases and 39000 recoveries and 670 deaths.
- As on 15 March, total number of cases was 40044, including 186 active cases and 39186 recoveries and 672 deaths.
- As on 29 March, total number of cases was 41226, including 991 active cases and 39554 recoveries and 681 deaths.

=== April 2021 ===
- As on 4 April, total number of cases in Puducherry was 42359, including 1592 active cases and 40083 recoveries and 684 fatalities.
- As on 8 April, total number of cases was 43242, including 2000 active cases and 40555 recoveries and 687 fatalities.
- As on 13 April, total number of cases is 44973, including 2800 active cases and 41477 cures and 696 deaths.
- On 22 April 2021, Puducherry crossed grim milestone of 50000 Covid cases.

=== May 2021 ===
- As on 9 May, total number of cases in Puducherry was 70076, including 13585 active cases and 55552 recoveries and 939 deaths.
- As on 11 May, total number of cases was 75024, including 14829 active cases and 59177 cures and 1018 deaths.
- As on 18 May, total number of cases in the UT was 87749, including 17477 active cases and 69060 recoveries and 1212 fatalities.
- As on 24 May, total number of cases was 98219, including 15475 active cases and 82336 cures and 1408 fatalities.
- As on 27 May, total number of cases is 100677, including 14473 active cases and 84749 cures and 1455 deaths.

=== June 2021 ===
- As on 18 June, total number of cases in Puducherry was 114301, including 4125 active cases and 108462 recoveries and 1714 died from virus.
- As on 26 June, total number of cases is 116414, including 2775 active cases and 111898 recoveries and 1741 deaths.

=== July 2021 ===
- As on 13 July, total number of cases in Puducherry was 119181, including 1384 active cases and 116064 recoveries and 1771 died from virus.

=== August 2021 ===
- As on 28 August, total number of cases in Puducherry was 123298, including 698 active cases and 120790 cures and 1810 deaths.

=== September 2021 ===
- As on 23 September, total number of cases in Puducherry was 125735, including 945 active cases and 122956 cures and 1834 deaths.
- As on 25 September, total number of cases in the UT was 125920, including 956 active cases and 123130 cures and 1834 deaths.
- As on 28 September, total number of cases was 126308, including 828 active cases and 123640 recoveries and 1840 deaths.

=== Oct to Dec 2021 ===
- As on 7 October, total number of cases in Puducherry was 126742, including 639 active cases and 124259 recoveries and 1844 deaths.
- As on 24 October, total number of cases in the UT was 127735, including 467 active cases and 125411 cures and 1857 deaths.
- As on 1 November, total number of cases was 128013, including 430 active cases and 125726 recoveries and 1857 deaths.
- As on 4 December, total number of cases was 129028, including 299 active cases and 126855 recoveries and 1874 deaths.
- As on 29 December, total number of cases was 127435, including 119 active cases and 129434 recoveries and 1880 deaths.

=== Jan to Mar 2022 ===
- As on 6 January, total number of cases in Puducherry was 129619, including 214 active cases and 127524 recoveries and 1881 deaths.
- As on 9 January, total number of cases is 130278, including 825 active cases and 127571 recoveries and 1882 deaths.
- As on 15 January, total number of cases in the UT was 136550, including 6785 active cases and 127879 recoveries and 1886 deaths.
- As on 25 January, total number of cases was 155254, including 16394 active cases and 136948 recoveries and 1912 fatal cases.
- As on 5 February, total number of cases was 163907, including 4930 active cases and 157330 recoveries and 1947 deaths.
- As on 11 February, total number of cases was 165071, including 1983 active cases and 161121 recoveries and 1957 deaths.
- As on 21 February, total number of cases in the UT was 165619, including 363 active cases and 163296 cures and 1960 deaths.
- As on 19 March, total number of cases in the UT was 165766, including 11 active cases and 163793 recoveries and 1962 deaths.

=== Apr to Jun 2022 ===
- As on 11 April, total number of cases in Puducherry was 165774, including zero active case and 163812 recoveries and 1962 deaths.
- As on 30 April, total number of cases was 165790, including 9 active cases and 163819 cures and 1962 deaths.
- As on 10 May, total number of cases was 165799, including 5 active cases and 163832 recoveries and 1962 deaths.
- As on 15 May, total number of cases was 165809, including 12 active cases and 163835 recoveries and 1962 deaths.
- As on 28 May, total number of cases was 165847, including 18 active cases and 163867 cures and 1962 deaths.
- As on 9 June, total number of cases was 165914, including 35 active cases and 163917 recoveries and 1962 deaths.
- As on 16 June, total number of cases was 165992, including 77 active cases and 163953 recoveries and 1962 fatal cases.

=== July to September 2022 ===
- As on 8 July, total number of cases in Puducherry was 167408, including 748 active case and 164698 recoveries and 1962 deaths.
- As on 26 August, total number of cases was 172630, including 288 active case and 170374 recoveries and 1968 deaths.

== Statistics ==
=== Total confirmed cases, active cases, recoveries and deaths ===
View chart definition.

== COVID-19 Vaccines with Approval for Emergency or Conditional Usage ==
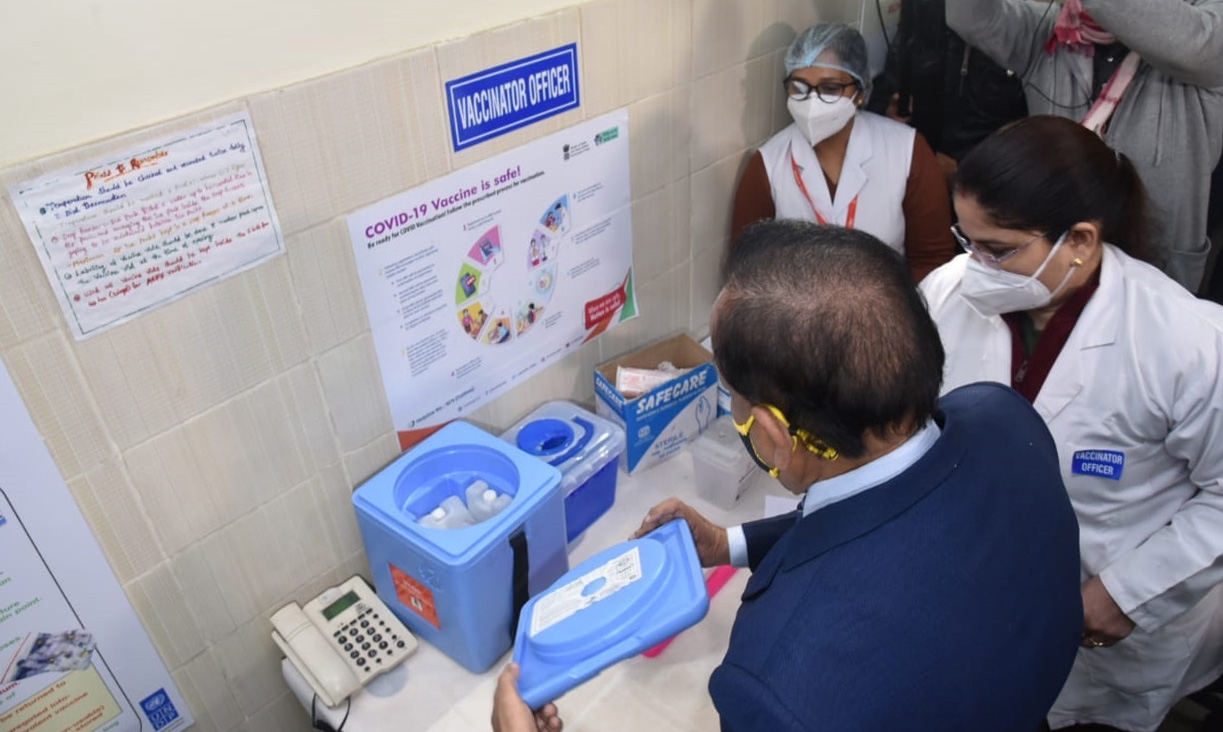
Union Minister for Health & Family Welfare, Dr. Harsh Vardhan visiting the GTB Hospital, Shahdara to review the preparedness of Dry Run of COVID-19 vaccine, in Delhi on January 02, 2021.

=== Covishield ===
On 1 January 2021, the Drug Controller General of India, approved the emergency or conditional use of AstraZeneca's COVID-19 vaccine AZD1222 (marketed as Covishield). Covishield is developed by the University of Oxford and its spin-out company, Vaccitech. It's a viral vector vaccine based on replication-deficient Adenovirus that causes cold in Chimpanzees. It can be stored, transported and handled at normal refrigerated conditions (two-eight degrees Celsius/ 36-46 degrees Fahrenheit). It has a shelf-life of at least six months.

On 12 January 2021 first batches of Covishield vaccine was despatched from the Serum Institute of India.

=== Covaxin ===
On 2 January 2021, BBV152 (marketed as Covaxin), first indigenous vaccine, developed by Bharat Biotech in association with the Indian Council of Medical Research and National Institute of Virology received approval from the Drug Controller General of India for its emergency or conditional usage.

On 14 January 2021 first batches of Covaxin vaccine was despatched from the Bharat Biotech, albeit it was still in the third phase of testing.

=== Others ===
On 19 May 2021, Dr Reddy's Labs received Emergency Use Authorisation for anti-COVID drug 2-DG. On 21 February 2022, Drugs Controller General of India granted approval to Biological E's COVID-19 vaccine Corbevax, that can be used for children between 12 and 18 years of age.

On 21 October 2021, India completed administering of one billion Covid vaccines in the country.

On 8 January 2022, India crossed 1.5 billion Covid vaccines milestone in the country.

On 19 February 2022, India crossed 1.75 billion Covid vaccines milestone in the country.

== See also ==
- COVID-19 pandemic in India
- COVID-19 pandemic
