= COVID-19 pandemic in Manipur =

- Disease: COVID-19
- Pathogen: SARS-CoV-2
- Location: Manipur, India
- First outbreak: Wuhan, Hubei, China
- Arrival date: 24 March 2020 (6 years, 5 months, 1 week and 2 days)
- Confirmed cases: 449 (13 June 2020)
- Active cases: 358
- Recovered: 91 (13 June 2020)
- Deaths: 0
- Fatality rate: 0%

The first case of the COVID-19 pandemic in India was reported on 30 January 2020, originating from China. Slowly, the pandemic spread to various states and union territories including the state of Manipur. The first case was recorded in this region on 24 March 2020.

== Timeline ==
=== June 2020 ===
- As of 5 June 2020, the total number of cases in Manipur was 157. There are 105 active cases and 52 have fully recovered from the virus.
- As of 7 June, the total number of cases is 172, including 120 active cases and 52 recoveries.
- As of 13 June, the total number of cases is 385, including 312 active cases and 73 recoveries.
- On 25 June, total Covid cases in Manipur crossed 1000 mark.
- As of 26 June, the total number of cases was 1075, including 682 active cases and 393 cures.

=== July 2020 ===
- As of 1 July, the total number of cases in Manipur was 1260, including 681 active cases and 578 cures.
- As of 6 July, the total number of cases was 1390, including 656 active cases and 734 recoveries.
- As of 12 July, the total number of cases was 1609, including 713 active cases and 896 recoveries.
- As of 18 July, the total number of cases was 1891, including 709 active cases and 1182 recoveries.
- As of 25 July, the total number of cases was 2176, including 656 active cases and 1520 cures.
- As of 30 July, the total number of cases in Manipur is 2505, including 829 active cases, 1672 recoveries and 4 deaths.

=== August 2020 ===
- As of 3 August, the total number of cases in Manipur was 2920, including 1147 active cases, 1766 cures and 7 deaths.
- As of 6 August, the total number of cases was 3217, including 1304 active cases, 1905 recoveries and 8 deaths.
- As of 9 August, the total number of cases was 3753. This includes 1698 active cases, 2044 recoveries and 11 deaths.
- As of 14 August, the total number of cases was 4198. This includes 1825 active cases, 2360 recoveries and 13 deaths.
- As of 19 August, the total number of cases was 4876 including 1973 active cases, 2885 cures and 18 deaths.
- On 22 August, Manipur reached a grim milestone of 5000 total covid cases.
- As of 25 August, the total number of cases was 5444. This includes 1608 active cases, 3812 recoveries and 24 deaths.
- As of 30 August, the total number of cases was 6112 including 1845 active cases, 4239 cures and 28 fatalities.

=== September 2020 ===
- As of 2 September, the total number of cases in Manipur was 6507, including 1871 active cases, 4607 cures and 29 deaths.
- As of 6 September, the total number of cases was 7022, including 1820 active cases, 5164 recoveries and 38 deaths.
- As of 7 September, the total number of cases was 7106, including 1710 active cases, 5358 cures and 38 deaths.
- As of 11 September, the total number of cases was 7579, including 1533 active cases, 6002 cures and 44 fatalities.
- As of 12 September, the total number of cases was 7731, including 1502 active cases, 6102 cures and 45 deaths.
- As of 13 September, the total number of cases was 7875, including 1638 active cases, 6191 recoveries and 46 deaths.
- As of 16 September, the total number of cases was 8320, including 1751 active cases, 6521 recoveries and 48 deaths.
- As of 19 September, the total number of cases was 8724, including 1946 active cases, 6723 cures and 55 fatalities.
- As of 20 September, the total number of cases in the state was 8894, including 2070 active cases, 6767 recoveries and 57 deaths.
- As of 22 September, the total number of cases is 9280, including 2333 active cases, 6887 cures and 60 deaths.
- As of 24 September, the total number of cases was 9537, including 2106 active cases, 7369 recoveries and 62 deaths.
- On 26 September, Manipur reached a grim milestone of 10000 total covid cases.
- As of 28 September, the total number of cases was 10477, including 2431 active cases, 7982 recoveries and 67 deaths.

=== October 2020 ===
- As of 2 October, the total number of cases in Manipur was 11397, including 2336 active cases, 8992 cures and 69 deaths.
- As of 4 October, the total number of cases was 11855, including 2576 active cases, 9205 cures and 74 deaths.
- As of 7 October, the total number of cases was 12489, including 2805 active cases, 9604 recoveries and 80 deaths.
- As of 11 October, the total number of cases was 13326, including 2731 active cases, 10504 cures and 91 deaths.
- As of 14 October, the total number of cases was 14074, including 3056 active cases, 10915 cures and 103 deaths.
- As of 27 October, the total number of cases was 17604, including 4246 active cases, 13208 recoveries and 150 fatalities.
- As of 30 October, the total number of cases was 18272, including 4303 active cases, 13805 cures and 164 deaths.

=== November 2020 ===
- On 7 November, total number of cases in Manipur crossed grim milestone of 20000 mark.
- As of 8 November, the total number of cases in Manipur was 20376, including 3107 active cases, 17072 cures and 197 deaths.
- As of 23 November, the total number of cases was 23650, including 3038 active cases, 20374 recoveries and 238 deaths.
- As of 25 November, the total number of cases was 24133, including 3248 active cases, 20640 recoveries and 245 fatalities.
- As of 30 November, the total number of cases in the state is 25045, including 3198 active cases, 21566 cures and 281 deaths.

=== December 2020 ===
- As of 3 December, the total number of cases in Manipur was 25536, including 3070 active cases, 22172 cures and 294 fatalities.
- As of 7 December, the total number of cases was 26225, including 2919 active cases, 22997 cures and 309 deaths.
- As of 16 December, the total number of cases was 27373, including 1937 active cases, 25107 recoveries and 329 deaths.
- As of 21 December, the total number of cases was 27684, including 1568 active cases, 25779 recoveries and 337 deaths.
- As of 27 December, the total number of cases was 28029, including 1277 active cases, 26404 recoveries and 348 fatalities.
- As of 28 December, the total number of cases in the state was 28060, including 1234 active cases, 26478 cures and 348 fatalities.
- As of 31 December, the total number of cases was 28188, including 1155 active cases, 27678 cures and 355 fatalities.

=== January 2021 ===
- As of 6 January, the total number of cases in Manipur was 28484, including 479 active cases, 27642 recoveries and 363 fatalities.
- As of 10 January, the total number of cases in Manipur was 28693, including 477 active cases, 27851 recoveries and 365 deaths.
- As of 14 January, the total number of cases in Manipur was 28787, including 446 active cases, 27976 recoveries and 365 deaths.
- As of 15 January, the total number of cases was 28811, including 436 active cases, 28010 recoveries and 365 deaths.
- As of 22 January, the total number of cases was 28953, including 197 active cases, 28387 cures and 369 fatalities.

=== February 2021 ===
- As of 1 February, the total number of cases in Manipur was 29072, including 139 active cases, 28562 recoveries and 371 deaths.
- As of 8 February, the total number of cases was 29130, including 85 active cases, 28672 recoveries and 373 deaths.
- As of 16 February, the total number of cases was 29213, including 83 active cases, 28757 recoveries and 373 deaths.
- As of 20 February, the total number of cases was 29233, including 84 active cases, 28776 cures and 373 deaths.

=== March 2021 ===
- As of 6 March, the total number of cases in Manipur was 29287, including 30 active cases, 28884 recoveries and 373 deaths.
- As of 29 March, the total number of cases was 29389, including 64 active cases, 28951 cures and 374 deaths.

=== April 2021 ===
- As of 5 April, the total number of cases in Manipur was 29419, including 59 active cases, 28986 recoveries and 374 deaths.
- As of 13 April, the total number of cases is 29537, including 115 active cases, 29046 recoveries and 376 deaths.

=== May 2021 ===
- As of 9 May, the total number of cases in Manipur was 34775, including 3851 active cases, 30463 recoveries and 461 deaths.
- As of 18 May, the total number of cases was 40059, including 6338 active cases, 33129 cures and 592 deaths.
- As of 26 May, the total number of cases was 46298, including 7243 active cases, 38325 cures and 730 fatalities.
- On 31 May, total number of cases in Manipur crossed grim milestone of 20000 mark.

=== June 2021 ===
- As of 17 June, the total number of cases in Manipur was 62343, including 9102 active cases, 52220 recoveries and 1021 deaths.
- As of 25 June, the total number of cases was 66756, including 5668 active cases, 59995 recoveries and 1093 have died.

=== July 2021 ===
- As of 13 July, the total number of cases in Manipur was 79417, including 7706 active cases, 70402 recoveries and 1309 deaths.
- As of 19 July, the total number of cases is 85596, including 9693 active cases, 74511 cures and 1392 deaths.

=== August 2021 ===
- As of 27 August, the total number of cases in Manipur was 112506, including 3747 active cases, 106992 recoveries and 1767 deaths.
- As of 30 August, the total number of cases was 113702, including 3492 active cases, 108403 recoveries and 1781 deaths.

=== September 2021 ===
- As of 23 September, the total number of cases in Manipur was 119041, including 2214 active cases, 114991 recoveries and 1836 deaths.
- As of 25 September, the total number of cases was 119445, including 2029 active cases, 115573 recoveries and 1843 deaths.
- As of 28 September, the total number of cases was 120216, including 2143 active cases, 116221 cures and 1852 fatalities.

=== Oct to Dec 2021 ===
- As of 7 October, the total number of cases in Manipur was 121462, including 1777 active cases, 117810 recoveries and 1875 deaths.
- As of 23 October, the total number of cases was 123229, including 961 active cases, 120361 cures and 1907 deaths.
- As of 2 November, the total number of cases was 123731, including 708 active cases, 121102 recoveries and 1921 deaths.
- As of 29 November, the total number of cases was 125152, including 685 active cases, 122496 cures and 1971 deaths.
- As of 14 December, the total number of cases was 125535, including 325 active cases, 123220 cures and 1990 fatalities.
- As of 29 December, the total number of cases was 125747, including 180 active cases, 123565 recoveries and 2002 fatalities.

=== Jan to Mar 2022 ===
- As of 9 January, the total number of cases in Manipur was 126088, including 334 active cases, 123644 recoveries and 2010 deaths.
- As of 15 January, the total number of cases was 126979, including 1063 active cases, 123902 recoveries and 2014 deaths.
- As of 25 January, the total number of cases was 130951, including 3597 active cases, 125321 recoveries and 2031 fatal cases.
- As of 5 February, the total number of cases was 134661, including 3793 active cases, 128809 cures and 2059 fatalities.
- As of 11 February, the total number of cases was 135638, including 2345 active cases, 131216 cures and 2077 deaths.
- As of 21 February, the total number of cases was 136506, including 649 active cases, 133756 recoveries and 2101 deaths.
- As of 27 February, the total number of cases was 136758, including 239 active cases, 134308 recoveries and 2111 deaths.
- As of 19 March, the total number of cases was 137039, including 103 active cases, 134816 recoveries and 2120 deaths.

=== Apr to Jun 2022 ===
- As of 11 April, the total number of cases in Manipur was 137162, including 38 active cases, 135004 recoveries and 2120 deaths.
- As of 18 April, the total number of cases was 137198, including 53 active cases, 135025 recoveries and 2120 deaths.
- As of 1 May, the total number of cases was 137220, including 14 active cases, 135086 cures and 2120 deaths.
- As of 12 May, the total number of cases was 137227, including 7 active cases, 135100 cures and 2120 fatal cases.
- As of 28 May, the total number of cases was 137236, including 6 active cases, 135110 recoveries and 2120 deaths. There hasn't been any Covid related death in the region in more than 2 months.
- As of 9 June, the total number of cases was 137242, including 1 active case, 135121 cures and 2120 deaths.
- As of 16 June, the total number of cases was 137244, including 2 active cases, 135122 cures and 2120 fatal cases.

=== July to September 2022 ===
- As of 8 July, the total number of cases in Manipur was 137389, including 117 active cases, 135151 cures and 2120 deaths. There hasn't been any Covid related death in the region in more than a quarter.
- As of 26 August, the total number of cases was 139671, including 86 active cases, 137439 recoveries and 2146 deaths.
- As of 31 August, the total number of cases was 139709, including 67 active cases, 137495 cures and 2147 fatal cases.
- As of 10 September, the total number of cases was 139755, including 27 active cases, 137580 recoveries and 2148 fatal cases.
- As of 24 September, the total number of cases was 139805, including 27 active cases, 137630 cures and 2148 deaths.
- As of 26 October, the total number of cases was 139871, including 22 active cases, 137700 recoveries and 2149 deaths.

=== 2023 ===
- As of 22 March 2023, the total number of cases in Manipur was 139924, including no active case, 137775 cures and 2149 deaths.

== COVID-19 Vaccines with Approval for Emergency or Conditional Usage ==
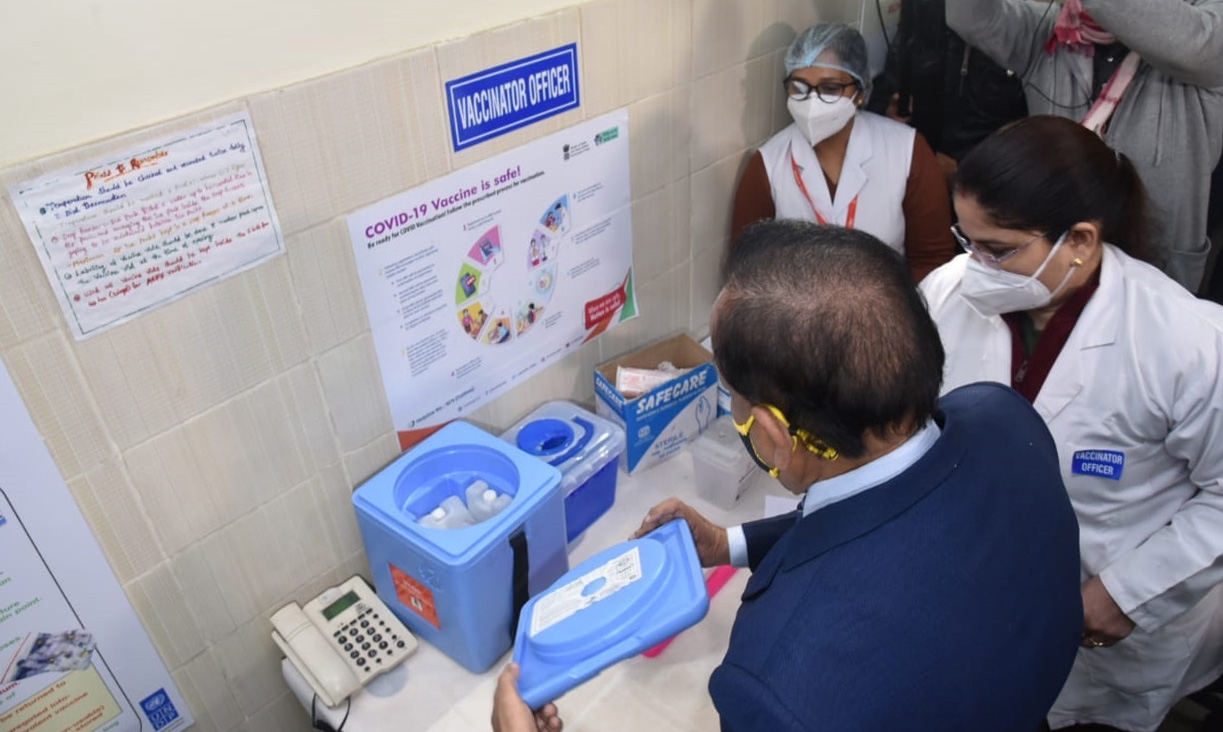
Union Minister for Health & Family Welfare, Dr. Harsh Vardhan visiting the GTB Hospital, Shahdara to review the preparedness of Dry Run of COVID-19 vaccine, in Delhi on January 02, 2021.

=== Covishield ===
On 1 January 2021, the Drug Controller General of India, approved the emergency or conditional use of AstraZeneca's COVID-19 vaccine AZD1222 (marketed as Covishield). Covishield is developed by the University of Oxford and its spin-out company, Vaccitech. It's a viral vector vaccine based on replication-deficient Adenovirus that causes cold in Chimpanzees. It can be stored, transported and handled at normal refrigerated conditions (two-eight degrees Celsius/ 36-46 degrees Fahrenheit). It has a shelf-life of at least six months.

On 12 January 2021 first batches of Covishield vaccine was despatched from the Serum Institute of India.

=== Covaxin ===
On 2 January 2021, BBV152 (marketed as Covaxin), first indigenous vaccine, developed by Bharat Biotech in association with the Indian Council of Medical Research and National Institute of Virology received approval from the Drug Controller General of India for its emergency or conditional usage.

On 14 January 2021 first batches of Covaxin vaccine was despatched from the Bharat Biotech, albeit it was still in the third phase of testing.

=== Others ===
On 19 May 2021, Dr Reddy's Labs received Emergency Use Authorisation for anti-COVID drug 2-DG. On 21 February 2022, Drugs Controller General of India granted approval to Biological E's COVID-19 vaccine Corbevax, that can be used for children between 12 and 18 years of age.

On 21 October 2021, India completed administering of one billion Covid vaccines in the country.

On 8 January 2022, India crossed 1.5 billion Covid vaccines milestone in the country.

On 19 February 2022, India crossed 1.75 billion Covid vaccines milestone in the country.

== See also ==
- COVID-19 pandemic in India
- COVID-19 pandemic
