= COVID-19 pandemic in Ladakh =

Ongoing COVID-19 viral pandemic in Ladakh, India

- Disease: COVID-19
- Pathogen: SARS-CoV-2
- Location: Ladakh, India
- First outbreak: Wuhan, Hubei, China
- Arrival date: 18 March 2020 (6 years, 5 months, 2 weeks and 1 day)
- Confirmed cases: 549 (14 June 2020)
- Active cases: 468
- Recovered: 80 (14 June 2020)
- Deaths: 1 (2 June 2020)
- Fatality rate: 0.18%

The first case of the COVID-19 pandemic in India was reported on 30 January 2020, originating from China. Slowly, the pandemic spread to various states and union territories of India including the union territory of Ladakh. The first two cases were recorded in this region on 7 March 2020.

== Timeline ==
=== May 2020 ===
- As on 14 May, total number of cases in Ladakh was 43, including 22 active cases and 21 recoveries.
- As on 24 May, total number of cases in Ladakh was 49, including six active cases and 43 recoveries.

=== June 2020 ===
- As on 7 June, total number of cases in Ladakh was 103, including 52 active cases 1 death and 50 recoveries.
- As on 12 June, total number of cases in Ladakh was 135, including 80 active cases 1 death and 54 cures.
- As on 18 June, total number of cases in Ladakh was 687, including 594 active cases 1 death and 92 cures.
- As on 23 June, total number of cases in Ladakh was 847, including 710 active cases 1 death and 136 recoveries.
- As on 26 June, total number of cases was 946, including 478 active cases 1 death and 467 have fully recovered.

=== July 2020 ===
- As on 1 July, total number of cases in Ladakh was 990, including 295 active cases 1 death and 694 cures.
- As on 8 July, total number of cases in Ladakh was 1047, including 158 active cases 1 death and 888 recoveries.
- As on 15 July, total number of cases was 1142, including 177 active cases, 1 death and 964 recoveries.
- As on 18 July, total number of cases as 1159, including 172 active cases, 2 deaths and 985 recoveries.
- As on 25 July, total number of cases was 1276, including 216 active cases, 3 deaths and 1057 cures.
- As on 30 July, total number of cases in the UT was 1378, including 278 active cases, 6 fatalities and 1094 cures.

=== August 2020 ===
- As on 3 August, total number of cases in Ladakh was 1485, including 369 active cases, 1109 recoveries and 7 deaths.
- As on 7 August, total number of cases were 1595, including 411 active cases, 1177 recoveries and 7 fatalities.
- As on 9 August, total number of cases were 1688, including 457 active cases, 1222 cures and 9 deaths.
- As on 13 August, total number of cases were 1849, including 558 active cases, 1282 cures and 9 deaths.
- As on 14 August, total number of cases were 1879, including 567 active cases, 1303 cures and 9 deaths.
- As on 15 August, total number of cases were 1909, including 592 active cases, 1307 cures and 10 deaths.
- As on 16 August, total number of cases were 1948, including 578 active cases, 1356 cures and 14 deaths.
- As on 17 August, total number of cases were 1966, including 584 active cases, 1368 cures and 14 deaths.
- As on 18 August, total number of cases were 2010, including 598 active cases, 1395 cures and 17 deaths.
- As on 19 August, total number of cases were 2048, including 633 active cases, 1397 cures and 18 deaths.
- As on 20 August, total number of cases were 2133, including 665 active cases, 1450 recoveries and 18 fatalities.
- As on 21 August, total number of cases were 2133, including 665 active cases, 1450 cures and 19 deaths.
- As on 23 August, total number of cases were 2279, including 765 active cases, 1491 cures and 23 deaths.
- As on 24 August, total number of cases were 2330, including 790 active cases, 1517 recoveries and 23 deaths.
- As on 25 August, total number of cases were 2420, including 847 active cases, 1549 recoveries and 24 fatalities.
- As on 28 August, total number of cases were 2540, including 798 active cases, 1714 cures and 28 deaths.
- As on 29 August, total number of cases were 2603, including 826 active cases, 1745 recoveries and 32 deaths.
- As on 30 August, total number of cases were 2638, including 847 active cases, 1757 recoveries and 34 fatalities.
- As on 31 August, total number of cases were 2681, including 773 active cases, 1874 recoveries and 34 deaths.

=== September 2020 ===
- As on 1 September, total number of cases in Ladakh was 2733, including 720 active cases, 1978 recoveries and 35 deaths.
- As on 6 September, total number of cases was 3036, including 850 active cases, 2151 recoveries and 35 deaths.
- As on 7 September, total number of cases was 3064, including 818 active cases, 2211 recoveries and 35 deaths.
- As on 12 September, total number of cases in the UT was 3294, including 841 active cases, 2414 recoveries and 39 deaths.
- As on 13 September, total number of cases was 3345, including 869 active cases, 2436 recoveries and 40 deaths.
- As on 17 September, total number of cases was 3576, including 971 active cases, 2558 recoveries and 47 fatalities.
- As on 22 September, total number of cases is 3832, including 1047 active cases, 2736 cures and 50 fatalities.
- As on 28 September, total number of cases was 4152, including 1030 active cases, 3064 recoveries and 58 deaths.

=== October 2020 ===
- As on 3 October, total number of cases in Ladakh was 4477, including 1101 active cases, 3315 recoveries and 61 deaths.
- As on 6 October, total number of cases was 4720, including 1195 active cases, 3464 recoveries and 61 deaths.
- As on 14 October, total number of cases was 5304, including 979 active cases, 4261 cures and 64 deaths.
- As on 21 October, total number of cases was 5781, including 848 active cases, 4865 cures and 68 fatalities.
- As on 29 October, total number of cases was 6139, including 628 active cases, 5438 recoveries and 73 deaths.

=== November 2020 ===
- As on 8 November, total number of cases in Ladakh was 6809, including 765 active cases, 5960 recoveries and 84 deaths.
- As on 23 November, total number of cases was 7945, including 859 active cases, 6985 recoveries and 101 deaths.

=== December 2020 ===
- As on 3 December, total number of cases in Ladakh was 8623, including 862 active cases, 7642 recoveries and 119 deaths.
- As on 4 December, total number of cases was 8691, including 859 active cases, 7713 recoveries and 119 fatalities.
- As on 7 December, total number of cases was 8893, including 858 active cases, 7915 cures and 120 fatalities.
- As on 16 December, total number of cases was 9217, including 628 active cases, 8466 recoveries and 123 have died.
- As on 24 December, total number of cases in the UT was 9309, including 237 active cases, 8947 recoveries and 125 have died.
- As on 28 December, total number of cases was 9411, including 198 active cases, 9087 recoveries and 126 have died.
- As on 31 December, total number of cases was 9466, including 196 active cases, 9127 recoveries and 127 deaths.

=== January 2021 ===
- As on 5 January, total number of cases in Ladakh was 9577, including 235 active cases, 9215 recoveries and 127 deaths.
- As on 10 January, total number of cases was 9618, including 197 active cases, 9294 recoveries and 127 deaths.
- As on 21 January, total number of cases was 9668, including 77 active cases, 9463 recoveries and 128 fatalities.

=== February 2021 ===
- As on 1 February, total number of cases in Ladakh was 9724, including 68 active cases, 9526 recoveries and 130 deaths.
- As on 8 February, total number of cases was 9753, including 71 active cases, 9552 recoveries and 130 deaths.
- As on 20 February, total number of cases was 9786, including 41 active cases, 9615 cures and 130 fatalities.

=== March 2021 ===
- As on 6 March, total number of cases in Ladakh was 9830, including 44 active cases, 9556 recoveries and 130 deaths.
- As on 14 March, total number of cases was 9847, including 31 active cases, 9686 recoveries and 130 deaths.
- As on 29 March, total number of cases in the UT was 10007, including 135 active cases, 9742 recoveries and 130 deaths.

=== April 2021 ===
- As on 4 April, total number of cases in Ladakh was 10255, including 323 active cases, 9802 cures and 130 have died.
- As on 11 April, total number of cases is 10765, including 611 active cases, 10023 cures and 131 deaths.

=== May 2021 ===
- As on 7 May, total number of cases in Ladakh was 15023, including 1400 active cases, 13471 recoveries and 152 deaths.
- As on 17 May, total number of cases was 16582, including 1542 active cases, 14875 recoveries and 165 fatalities.
- As on 24 May, total number of cases was 17532, including 1463 active cases, 15891 cures and 178 deaths.

=== June 2021 ===
- As on 17 June, total number of cases in Ladakh was 19704, including 482 active cases, 19022 recoveries and 200 died from the virus.
- As on 23 June, total number of cases was 19871, including 300 active cases, 19369 recoveries and 200 deaths.

=== July 2021 ===
- As on 13 July, total number of cases in Ladakh was 20204, including 104 active cases, 19894 recoveries and 206 died from the virus.

=== August 2021 ===
- As on 27 August, total number of cases in Ladakh was 20522, including 63 active cases, 20252 recoveries and 207 died from the virus.

=== September 2021 ===
- As on 23 September, total number of cases in Ladakh was 20750, including 148 active cases, 20395 recoveries and 207 deaths.
- As on 25 September, total number of cases in the UT was 20776, including 164 active cases, 20405 recoveries and 207 deaths.

=== Oct to Dec 2021 ===
- As on 8 October, total number of cases in Ladakh was 20848, including 60 active cases, 20580 cures and 208 deaths.
- As on 23 October, total number of cases was 20899, including 38 active cases, 20653 recoveries and 208 deaths.
- As on 1 November, total number of cases was 20962, including 67 active cases, 20687 recoveries and 208 fatalities.
- As on 28 November, total number of cases was 21494, including 249 active cases, 21032 cures and 213 fatalities.
- As on 4 December, total number of cases was 21669, including 311 active cases, 21143 cures and 215 deaths.
- As on 29 December, total number of cases was 22140, including 214 active cases, 21707 cures and 219 deaths.

=== Jan to Mar 2022 ===
- As on 10 January, total number of cases in Ladakh was 22561, including 340 active cases, 22000 recoveries and 221 deaths.
- As on 16 January, total number of cases was 23209, including 741 active cases, 22246 cures and 222 deaths.
- As on 22 January, total number of cases was 24496, including 1275 active cases, 22999 cures and 222 fatalities.
- As on 25 January, total number of cases was 25036, including 1317 active cases, 23496 recoveries and 223 fatal cases.
- As on 29 January, total number of cases in the UT was 25763, including 1261 active cases, 24278 recoveries and 224 deaths.
- As on 5 February, total number of cases was 26821, including 1025 active cases, 25570 cures and 226 deaths.
- As on 11 February, total number of cases was 27339, including 583 active cases, 26530 cures and 226 deaths.
- As on 16 February, total number of cases was 27671, including 497 active cases, 26946 cures and 228 fatalities.
- As on 27 February, total number of cases was 28003, including 166 active cases, 27609 recoveries and 228 fatalities.
- As on 9 March, total number of cases was 28144, including 88 active cases, 27828 recoveries and 228 deaths.
- As on 19 March, total number of cases was 28200, including 47 active cases, 27925 cures and 228 deaths.

=== Apr to Jun 2022 ===
- As on 11 April, total number of cases in Ladakh was 28236, including 12 active cases, 27996 recoveries and 228 deaths.
- As on 30 April, total number of cases in the UT was 28246, including 2 active cases, 28016 cures and 228 deaths.
- As on 11 May, total number of cases was 28253, including 7 active cases, 28018 recoveries and 228 deaths.
- As on 15 May, total number of cases was 28256, including 8 active cases, 28020 cures and 228 deaths.
- As on 28 May, total number of cases was 28263, including 5 active cases, 28030 cures and 228 fatal cases.
- As on 9 June, total number of cases was 28276, including 7 active cases, 28041 cures and 228 deaths. There hasn't been any Covid death in the state of Sikkim in more than 2 months.
- As on 16 June, total number of cases was 28306, including 31 active cases, 28047 recoveries and 228 deaths.

=== July to September 2022 ===
- As on 8 July, total number of cases in Ladakh was 28555, including 125 active cases, 28202 recoveries and 228 deaths.
- As on 16 July, total number of cases was 28629, including 68 active cases, 28333 cures and 228 deaths.
- As on 29 August, total number of cases was 29200, including 50 active cases, 28920 recoveries and 230 fatal cases.
- As on 4 September, total number of cases was 29241, including 43 active cases, 28968 recoveries and 230 deaths.
- As on 17 September, total number of cases was 29304, including 34 active cases, 29040 cures and 230 deaths.
- As on 26 October, total number of cases was 29387, including 110 active cases, 29046 recoveries and 231 fatalities.

== COVID-19 Vaccines with Approval for Emergency or Conditional Usage ==
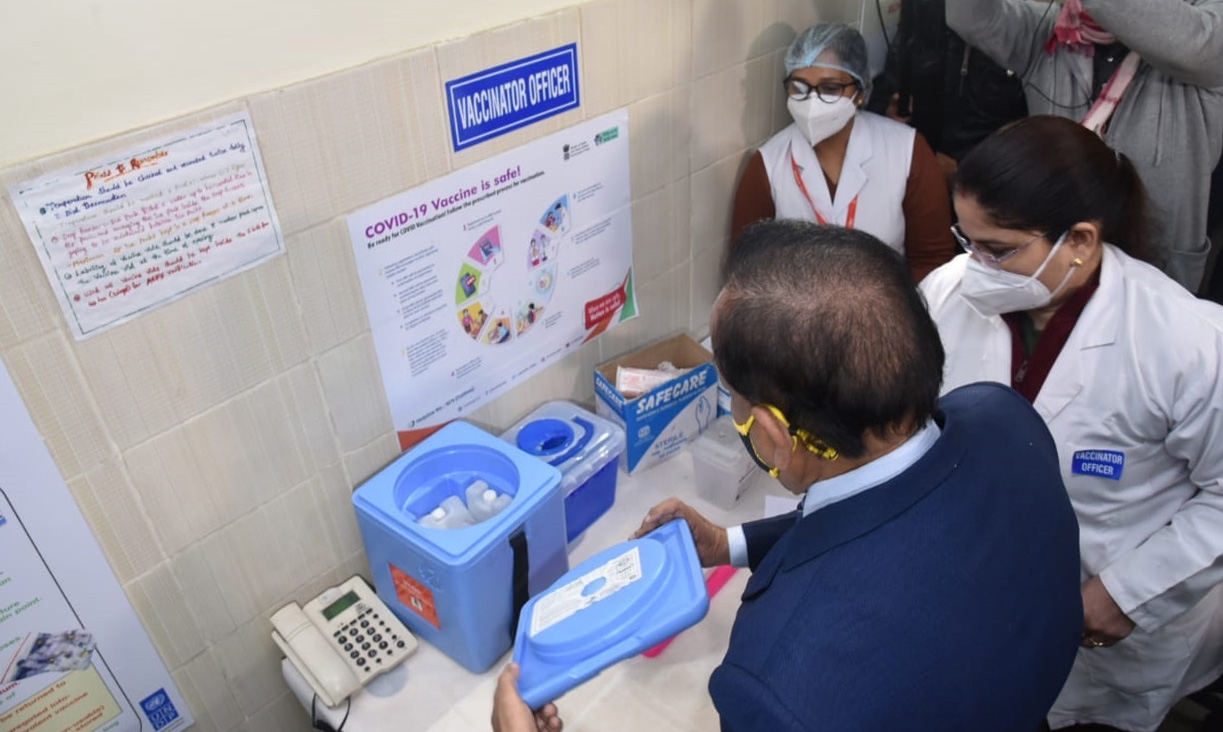
Union Minister for Health & Family Welfare, Dr. Harsh Vardhan visiting the GTB Hospital, Shahdara to review the preparedness of Dry Run of COVID-19 vaccine, in Delhi on January 02, 2021.

=== Covishield ===
On 1 January 2021, the Drug Controller General of India, approved the emergency or conditional use of AstraZeneca's COVID-19 vaccine AZD1222 (marketed as Covishield). Covishield is developed by the University of Oxford and its spin-out company, Vaccitech. It's a viral vector vaccine based on replication-deficient Adenovirus that causes cold in Chimpanzees. It can be stored, transported and handled at normal refrigerated conditions (two-eight degrees Celsius/ 36-46 degrees Fahrenheit). It has a shelf-life of at least six months.

On 12 January 2021 first batches of Covishield vaccine was despatched from the Serum Institute of India.

=== Covaxin ===
On 2 January 2021, BBV152 (marketed as Covaxin), first indigenous vaccine, developed by Bharat Biotech in association with the Indian Council of Medical Research and National Institute of Virology received approval from the Drug Controller General of India for its emergency or conditional usage.

On 14 January 2021 first batches of Covaxin vaccine was despatched from the Bharat Biotech, albeit it was still in the third phase of testing.

=== Others ===
On 19 May 2021, Dr Reddy's Labs received Emergency Use Authorisation for anti-COVID drug 2-DG. On 21 February 2022, Drugs Controller General of India granted approval to Biological E's COVID-19 vaccine Corbevax, that can be used for children between 12 and 18 years of age.

On 21 October 2021, India completed administering of one billion Covid vaccines in the country.

On 8 January 2022, India crossed 1.5 billion Covid vaccines milestone in the country.

On 19 February 2022, India crossed 1.75 billion Covid vaccines milestone in the country.

== See also ==
- COVID-19 pandemic in India
- COVID-19 pandemic in the World
