= COVID-19 pandemic in Meghalaya =

Ongoing COVID-19 viral pandemic in Meghalaya, India

- Disease: COVID-19
- Pathogen: SARS-CoV-2
- Location: Meghalaya, India
- First outbreak: Wuhan, Hubei, China
- Index case: Shillong
- Arrival date: 14 April 2020 (6 years, 7 months, 1 week and 1 day)
- Confirmed cases: 44 (10 June 2020)
- Active cases: 17
- Recovered: 26 (14 June 2020)
- Deaths: 1 (15 April 2020)
- Fatality rate: 2.27%

Government website
- meghealth.gov.in

The first case of the COVID-19 pandemic in India was reported on 30 January 2020, originating from China. Slowly, the pandemic spread to various states and union territories including the state of Meghalaya. The first case was recorded in this region on 14 April.

== Timeline ==
=== May 2020 ===
- As on 24 May, total number of cases in Meghalaya is 14, including one active case, 12 recoveries, and one death.

=== June 2020 ===
- As on 3 June, total number of cases in Meghalaya was 31, including 17 active cases, 13 recoveries, and one death.
- As on 7 June, total number of cases in Meghalaya was 36, including 22 active cases, 13 recoveries, and one death.
- As on 12 June, total number of cases in Meghalaya was 43, including 24 active cases, 18 recoveries, and one death.
- As on 23 June, total number of cases in Meghalaya was 45, including 7 active cases, 37 cures, and one death.

=== July 2020 ===
- As on 1 July, total number of cases in Meghalaya was 55, including 12 active cases, 42 cures, and one death.
- As on 6 July, total number of cases was 88, including 44 active cases, 43 recoveries, and one death.
- As on 12 July, total number of cases was 295, including 248 active cases, 45 recoveries, and 2 fatalities.
- As on 17 July, total number of cases was 377, including 326 active cases, 49 recoveries, and 2 deaths.
- As on 22 July, total number of cases was 504, including 433 active cases, 77 recoveries, and 4 deaths.
- As on 27 July, total number of cases was 738, including 547 active cases, 186 recoveries, and 5 deaths.

=== August 2020 ===
- As on 1 August, total number of cases in Meghalaya was 856, including 599 active cases, 252 cures and 5 deaths.
- As on 5 August, total number of cases was 937, including 594 active case, 338 recoveries and 5 deaths.
- On 7 August, total cases in Meghalya crossed the milestone of 1000.
- As on 9 August, total number of cases was 1023, including 594 active case, 423 recoveries and 6 deaths.
- As on 13 August, total number of cases was 1191, including 638 active case, 547 cures and 6 deaths.
- As on 18 August, total number of cases was 1457, including 766 active case, 685 recoveries and 6 deaths.
- As on 23 August, total number of cases in the state was 1917, including 1133 active case, 776 recoveries and 8 fatalities.
- As on 28 August, total number of cases is 2202, including 1287 active case, 906 cures and 9 fatalities.

=== September 2020 ===
- As on 6 September, total number of cases in Meghalaya was 3005, including 1433 active cases, 1556 cures and 16 deaths.
- As on 7 September, total number of cases was 3034, including 1457 active cases, 1560 cures and 17 deaths.
- As on 11 September, total number of cases was 3447, including 1534 active case, 1889 cures and 24 deaths.
- As on 12 September, total number of cases was 3615, including 1570 active case, 2020 recoveries and 25 deaths.
- As on 13 September, total number of cases was 3724, including 1623 active case, 2075 recoveries and 26 fatalities.
- As on 16 September, total number of cases in the state was 4195, including 1902 active case, 2264 cures and 29 deaths.
- As on 19 September, total number of cases was 4559, including 2040 active case, 2483 recoveries and 36 deaths.
- As on 20 September, total number of cases in the state was 4660, including 2111 active case, 2513 recoveries and 36 fatalities.
- As on 23 September, total number of cases was 4961, including 2060 active case, 2859 cures and 42 deaths.
- On 24 September, total cases in Meghalya crossed the grim milestone of 5000.
- As on 28 September, total number of cases was 5362, including 1448 active case, 3868 recoveries and 46 fatalities.

=== October 2020 ===
- As on 1 October, total number of cases in Meghalaya was 5802, including 1750 active case, 4001 cures and 51 deaths.
- As on 3 October, total number of cases was 6456, including 2083 active case, 4319 recoveries and 54 deaths.
- As on 6 October, total number of cases was 7037, including 2371 active case, 4606 recoveries and 60 deaths.
- As on 10 October, total number of cases was 7544, including 2437 active case, 5045 cures and 62 deaths.
- As on 14 October, total number of cases was 7991, including 2339 active case, 5582 recoveries and 70 deaths.
- As on 25 October, total number of cases was 9017, including 1604 active case, 7332 recoveries and 81 fatalities.
- As on 27 October, total number of cases was 9135, including 1410 active case, 7643 recoveries and 82 deaths.
- As on 30 October, total number of cases was 9379, including 1167 active case, 8125 recoveries and 87 fatalities.

=== November 2020 ===
- As on 4 November, total number of cases in Meghalaya was 9798, including 956 active case, 8752 cures and 90 deaths.
- On 7 November, the total number of cases in Meghalaya surpassed 10,000 cases.
- As on 8 November, total number of cases was 10202, including 1034 active case, 9075 cures and 93 deaths.
- As on 10 November, total number of cases was 10296, including 961 active case, 9241 cures and 94 deaths.
- As on 23 November, total number of cases was 11397, including 895 active case, 10392 recoveries and 110 fatalities.
- As on 26 November, total number of cases is 11581, including 947 active case, 10524 recoveries and 110 deaths.

=== December 2020 ===
- As on 2 December, total number of cases in Meghalaya was 11954, including 686 active case, 11154 cures and 114 deaths.
- As on 6 December, total number of cases was 12237, including 664 active case, 11453 cures and 120 deaths.
- As on 15 December, total number of cases was 13007, including 690 active case, 12186 recoveries and 131 deaths.
- As on 20 December, total number of cases was 13253, including 499 active case, 12620 recoveries and 134 fatalities.
- As on 23 December, total number of cases was 13328, including 299 active case, 12894 cures and 135 fatalities.
- As on 31 December, total number of cases was 13427, including 149 active case, 13134 cures and 139 deaths.

=== January 2021 ===
- As on 3 January, total number of cases in Meghalaya was 13460, including 135 active case, 13186 cures and 139 deaths.
- As on 6 January, total number of cases was 13525, including 154 active case, 13230 recoveries and 141 deaths.
- As on 10 January, total number of cases was 13611, including 155 active case, 13313 recoveries and 143 deaths.
- As on 15 January, total number of cases was 13691, including 161 active case, 13386 recoveries and 144 deaths.
- As on 21 January, total number of cases was 13721, including 129 active case, 13446 recoveries and 146 deaths.

=== February 2021 ===
- As on 1 February, total number of cases in Meghalaya was 13764, including 62 active case, 13556 cures and 146 deaths.
- As on 10 February, total number of cases was 13924, including 164 active case, 13612 recoveries and 148 deaths.
- As on 13 February, total number of cases was 13937, including 166 active case, 13623 cures and 148 deaths.
- As on 16 February, total number of cases was 13944, including 100 active case, 13696 cures and 148 fatalities.
- As on 23 February, total number of cases was 13955, including 20 active case, 13787 cures and 148 deaths.

=== March 2021 ===
- As on 6 March, total number of cases in Meghalaya was 13968, including 14 active case, 13806 cures and 148 deaths.
- As on 14 March, total number of cases was 13997, including 29 active case, 13820 cures and 148 deaths.
- As on 29 March, total number of cases was 14034, including 26 active case, 13858 cures and 150 deaths.

=== April 2021 ===
- As on 4 April, total number of cases in Meghalaya was 14122, including 102 active case, 13840 recoveries and 150 deaths.
- As on 8 April, total number of cases was 14165, including 131 active case, 13883 recoveries and 151 fatalities.
- As on 13 April, total number of cases is 14387, including 270 active case, 13966 recoveries and 151 deaths.

=== May 2021 ===
- As on 7 May, total number of cases in Meghalaya was 18927, including 2466 active cases, 16262 recoveries and 199 deaths.
- As on 11 May, total number of cases was 20579, including 3297 active cases, 17040 recoveries and 242 deaths.
- As on 17 May, total number of cases was 23966, including 4915 active cases, 18715 cures and 336 deaths.
- As on 19 May, total number of cases was 25744, including 5769 active cases, 19596 cures and 379 fatalities.
- As on 27 May, total number of cases was 33104, including 8255 active cases, 24325 recoveries and 524 fatalities.

=== June 2021 ===
- As on 17 June, total number of cases in Meghalaya was 43732, including 4609 active cases, 38361 recoveries and 762 deaths.

=== July 2021 ===
- As on 13 July, total number of cases in Meghalaya was 55218, including 3964 active cases, 50336 recoveries and 918 deaths.

=== August 2021 ===
- As on 28 August, total number of cases in Meghalaya was 75336, including 2710 active cases, 71327 cures and 1299 deaths.

=== September 2021 ===
- As on 23 September, total number of cases in Meghalaya was 79983, including 1868 active cases, 76730 cures and 1385 deaths.
- As on 25 September, total number of cases was 80430, including 1990 active cases, 77051 cures and 1389 deaths.
- As on 29 September, total number of cases was 81161, including 1693 active cases, 78068 cures and 1400 deaths.

=== Oct to Dec 2021 ===
- As on 7 October, total number of cases in Meghalaya was 82068, including 1310 active cases, 79346 cures and 1412 deaths.
- As on 24 October, total number of cases was 83371, including 639 active cases, 81286 cures and 1446 deaths.
- As on 2 November, total number of cases is 83627, including 431 active cases, 81746 recoveries and 1450 fatalities.
- As on 4 December, total number of cases is 84556, including 296 active cases, 82785 recoveries and 1475 deaths.
- As on 29 December, total number of cases is 84802, including 60 active cases, 83259 cures and 1483 deaths.

=== Jan to Mar 2022 ===
- As on 9 January, total number of cases in Meghalaya was 85158, including 328 active cases, 83345 cures and 1485 deaths.
- As on 16 January, total number of cases was 86147, including 991 active cases, 83666 cures and 1490 deaths.
- As on 21 January, total number of cases was 88141, including 2002 active cases, 84643 recoveries and 1496 deaths.
- As on 25 January, total number of cases was 89161, including 2360 active cases, 85302 recoveries and 1499 fatal cases.
- As on 29 January, total number of cases was 90522, including 2419 active cases, 86585 recoveries and 1518 deaths.
- As on 11 February, total number of cases was 92847, including 928 active cases, 90360 cures and 1559 deaths.
- As on 21 February, total number of cases was 93304, including 373 active cases, 91390 cures and 1571 fatalities.
- As on 27 February, total number of cases was 93473, including 196 active cases, 91699 recoveries and 1578 deaths.
- As on 9 March, total number of cases was 93625, including 126 active cases, 91913 cures and 1586 deaths.

=== April to June 2022 ===
- As on 7 April, total number of cases was in Meghalaya 93779, including 18 active cases, 92168 cures and 1593 deaths.
- As on 13 April, total number of cases was 93786, including 7 active cases, 92186 recoveries and 1593 deaths.
- As on 1 May, total number of cases was 93800, including 6 active cases, 92201 recoveries and 1593 fatal cases.
- As on 12 May, total number of cases was 93812, including 12 active cases, 92207 recoveries and 1593 deaths.
- As on 28 May, total number of cases was 93824, including 3 active cases, 92228 cures and 1593 deaths. There hasn't been any Covid related death in the region in around 2 months.
- As on 12 June, total number of cases was 93829, including 3 active cases, 92233 cures and 1593 fatal cases.
- As on 22 June, total number of cases was 93878, including 16 active cases, 92268 recoveries and 1594 deaths.

=== July to September 2022 ===
- As on 16 July, total number of cases was in Meghalaya 94267, including 182 active cases, 92490 cures and 1595 deaths.
- As on 29 August, total number of cases was 96410, including 94 active cases, 94699 recoveries and 1617 deaths.
- As on 6 September, total number of cases was 96496, including 82 active cases, 94797 recoveries and 1617 fatal cases.
- As on 17 September, total number of cases was 96608, including 49 active cases, 94938 cures and 1621 deaths.
- As on 26 October, total number of cases was 96754, including 13 active cases, 95117 recoveries and 1624 deaths.

== COVID-19 Vaccines with Approval for Emergency or Conditional Usage ==
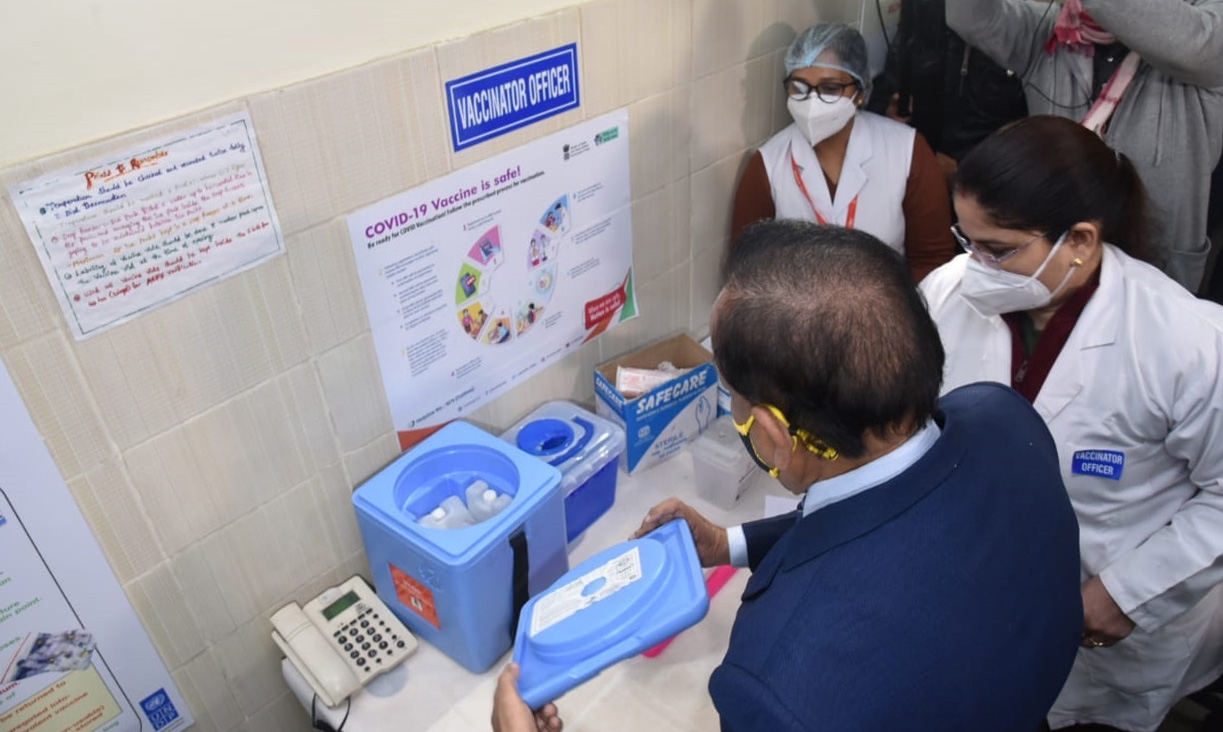
Union Minister for Health & Family Welfare, Dr. Harsh Vardhan visiting the GTB Hospital, Shahdara to review the preparedness of Dry Run of COVID-19 vaccine, in Delhi on January 02, 2021.

=== Covishield ===
On 1 January 2021, the Drug Controller General of India, approved the emergency or conditional use of AstraZeneca's COVID-19 vaccine AZD1222 (marketed as Covishield). Covishield is developed by the University of Oxford and its spin-out company, Vaccitech. It's a viral vector vaccine based on replication-deficient Adenovirus that causes cold in Chimpanzees. It can be stored, transported and handled at normal refrigerated conditions (two-eight degrees Celsius/ 36-46 degrees Fahrenheit). It has a shelf-life of at least six months.

On 12 January 2021 first batches of Covishield vaccine was despatched from the Serum Institute of India.

=== Covaxin ===
On 2 January 2021, BBV152 (marketed as Covaxin), first indigenous vaccine, developed by Bharat Biotech in association with the Indian Council of Medical Research and National Institute of Virology received approval from the Drug Controller General of India for its emergency or conditional usage.

On 14 January 2021 first batches of Covaxin vaccine was despatched from the Bharat Biotech, albeit it was still in the third phase of testing.

=== Others ===
On 19 May 2021, Dr Reddy's Labs received Emergency Use Authorisation for anti-COVID drug 2-DG. On 21 February 2022, Drugs Controller General of India granted approval to Biological E's COVID-19 vaccine Corbevax, that can be used for children between 12 and 18 years of age.

On 21 October 2021, India completed administering of one billion Covid vaccines in the country.

On 8 January 2022, India crossed 1.5 billion Covid vaccines milestone in the country.

On 19 February 2022, India crossed 1.75 billion Covid vaccines milestone in the country.

== See also ==
- COVID-19 pandemic in India
- COVID-19 pandemic
