= Pragya D. Yadav =

Indian virologist and researcher

- Born: 1 July 1978 (age 47); Sant Kabir Nagar, Uttar Pradesh, India
- Other names: PD Yadav; Pragya Dhruv Yadav
- Citizenship: India
- Education: B.Sc., M.Sc., Ph.D.
- Alma mater: Dr. Ram Manohar Lohia Avadh University; University of Pune
- Known for: Research contributions in the field of communicable diseases and pathogenic viral infections. Animal studies to develop COVID-19 vaccines Covaxin and ZyCoV-D in India.
- Awards: Rashtriya Vigyan Puraskar: Vigyan Yuva-Shanti Swarup Bhatnagar Award by Government of India (2024) Bharat Bhagya Vidhata Award by Ministry of Culture (2022); NAMS's Dr. Vinod Kumar Bhargava Award (2021); ICMR's Major General Saheb Singh Sokhey Award (2017); ICMR's Dr. T Ram Chandra Rao Award (2012)
- Scientific career
- Fields: Molecular biology Virology; Biocontainment

Pragya D. Yadav (born 1 July 1978) is an Indian scientist at the ICMR-National Institute of Virology (NIV), who is known for her research contributions in the field of communicable diseases and highly pathogenic viral infections, such as Crimean–Congo hemorrhagic fever (CCHF), Nipah, Ebola, leading to improvising national public health surveillance policy for interventions and management. Yadav is among the scientists who detected the first three COVID-19 pandemic cases in India. She headed the team that developed Covaxin, the first indigenous COVID-19 vaccine in India

She was conferred the 2017 Major Gen Saheb Singh Sokhey Award in October 2019 by the Indian Council of Medical Research, Ministry of Health and Family Welfare. She was selected as fellow of the Centers for Disease Control and Prevention, USA, Japan International Cooperation Agency, Japan. She was elected fellow of the National Academy of Agricultural Sciences, India.

== Early life and career ==
She was born on 1 July 1978, in Kui Kol, Sant Kabir Nagar district, in the North Indian state of Uttar Pradesh. She studied at Sarswati Shishu Mandir in Tanda, Ambedkar Nagar, from 1984 to 1989 and attended Vidyut Parishad Intermediate College, Tanda, from 1989 to 1995. She holds a B.Sc. and M.Sc. from Dr. Ram Manohar Lohia Avadh University. She completed a Doctoral degree at the ICMR-National Institute of Virology in affiliation with the University of Pune in 2004.

== Work ==
Yadav joined ICMR-National Institute of Virology in 2003. In 2006, she traveled to the Centers for Disease Control and Prevention, USA, for Biosafety level four laboratory (BSL 4) management training. After returning from the US, she was involved in setting up the BSL 4 lab at NIV, which was operationalized in 2013. She is in-charge of Biosafety level 4 (BSL 4) laboratory at the National Institute of Virology (NIV). Yadav was instrumental in isolating the SARS-CoV-2 virus and conducting animal studies to develop indigenous COVID-19 vaccines Covaxin and ZyCoV-D. She has expertise in Crimean-Congo hemorrhagic fever, Nipah, Ebola, Hantaan orthohantavirus, Kyasanur Forest disease, Viral hemorrhagic fever and Severe Acute Respiratory Syndrome coronavirus. Her clinical research includes co-authoring 226 peer-reviewed articles in the past 17 years.

Yadav is a member of the Advisory Council of the International Society on Crimean-Congo Hemorrhagic Fever in 2017. She is a Task Force member of the Coalition for Epidemic Preparedness Innovations (CEPI) Standards Assays Nipah in 2019. She is also a member of the WHO SEARO Expert Reference Group on the Nipah virus in 2020.

In one of her research studies published in April 2022 by the Indian Journal of Medical Research, in which she wrote that there is no evidence to claim that bat coronaviruses can cause disease in humans and also bat coronaviruses have no relation with SARS-CoV-2 responsible for the COVID-19 pandemic.

== Awards and recognition ==
Pragya D Yadav was awarded the Bharat Bhagya Vidhata Award by the Ministry of Culture (India) in March 2022. The award was presented by the former Union health minister J. P. Nadda at the Red Fort. The National Academy of Medical Sciences conferred the Dr. Pran Nath Chhuttani Oration Award for 2021–2022. She was awarded the Dr. K.M. Bhansali Oration award by the Indian Association of Occupational Health, Mumbai, in 2021 followed by the Dr. Vinod Kumar Bhargava Award by the National Academy of Medical Sciences in the same year. In October 2019, Yadav was honoured with the Major General Saheb Singh Sokhey Award 2017 by the Indian Council of Medical Research for research on the public health importance of Crimean-Congo Hemorrhagic Fever in India. The award was given by the Union Health Minister, Harsh Vardhan. In 2012, she was awarded the ICMR's Dr. T Ram Chandra Rao Award by the Ministry of Health and Family Welfare, Government of India.

She has received many other awards such as:

- Young Scientist Awards, by the National Academy of Vector-Borne Disease Association, 2013
- Research Foundation ICMR-NIV, Achievers of the year 2016-2017
- Exemplary Services Award by the Indian Council of Medical Research for work on Nipah virus, 2019
- Indian Virology Society Award, 2019
- COVID Worrier Award by the Governor of Maharashtra, 2020
- Amritsar Award, by the National Academy of Medical Sciences, Government of India, 2021
- Outstanding COVID-19 Frontline Warrior Award for the COVID-19 work, by the National Academy of Sciences, India, 2021
