= Mohan Kapur =

Indian film and television actor

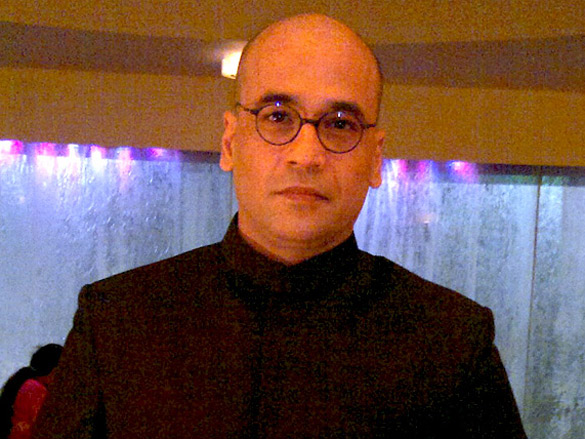
- Kapur in 2011
- Occupations: Actor; television host; voice artist
- Years active: 1992–present

Mohan Kapur is an Indian actor, television host, and voice artist who works predominantly in Hindi films and television. He is best known for his role as Yusuf Khan, father of Ms. Marvel, in the Marvel Cinematic Universe (MCU) projects Ms. Marvel (2022), The Marvels (2023), and Daredevil: Born Again (2025), as well as for hosting the game show Saanp Seedi on Zee TV.

== Career ==
=== Television ===
Kapur gained prominence as the host of Saanp Seedi (Snakes & Ladders), the first original Indian programme produced for a satellite network by Zee TV (1992–1994). The show, a combination of a game and talk show format, featured celebrity guests and was broadcast across the Asia-Pacific, including Pakistan, Nepal, and Sri Lanka. He later hosted shows like Surf Wheel of Fortune (1995–1997) and Philips Top 10 (1995). Kapur also appeared in supporting roles in series such as Hip Hip Hurray (1996–1999), Hostages (2019–2020), where he earned praise for his role as Subramanian, and Karmma Calling (2024).

=== Film ===
Kapur debuted in films as the lead antagonist in Beqabu (1996). He has since appeared in over 60 films, often portraying complex characters, including the "surprise antagonist" in projects like Sadak 2 (2020) and Hostages. Notable film roles include Jolly LLB (2013), Happy New Year (2014), Mission Mangal (2019), and The Vaccine War (2023). His international breakthrough came with the role of Yusuf Khan in the MCU's Ms. Marvel (2022), followed by The Marvels (2023) and Daredevil: Born Again (2025).

=== Voice acting ===
Kapur is a prolific voice artist, having dubbed for Hollywood actors such as Dwayne Johnson, Tom Hardy, Nicolas Cage, and Jackie Chan in Hindi versions of films like Fast & Furious 6 (2013), The Dark Knight Rises (2012), and The Karate Kid (2010). He is notably recognized for voicing Doctor Strange in the Hindi dubs of MCU films, including Doctor Strange (2016) and Avengers: Endgame (2019).

== Filmography ==
Key
†	Denotes films that have not yet been released

=== Films ===
Year	Title	Role	Notes
1996	Beqabu	Zanjarh Singh	
1997	Zameer: The Awakening of a Soul		
1997	Pyaar Mein Kabhi Kabhi	Khushi's Father	
1998	Angaaray	Lala Roshanlal's Brother (Mitthu)	
2002	Deewangee	Vikrant Kapoor	
2011	Haunted – 3D	Priest	
2011	Game	Karamvir	
2011	Bodyguard	Professor	
2011	Soundtrack	Charandeep S. Dhingra (Charlie)	
2012	Bittoo Boss		
2012	Hate Story	Cabinet Minister K. Malhotra	
2012	Life's Good		
2012	Raaz 3: The Third Dimension	Doctor	
2013	Jolly LLB	Yograj Dewan	
2013	Inkaar		
2013	Sooper Se Ooper	Lal	
2014	Creature 3D	Doctor Moga	
2014	Happy New Year	Mr. Kapoor, Charan's Assistant	
2014	Zid	Newspaper Editor Karan	
2015	I	Sushil	Tamil film; uncredited
2015	Kamasutra 3D	Kamasutra Guru's Apprentice	
2017	Manjha	Veena's Husband	Marathi film
2018	Yamla Pagla Deewana: Phir Se	Marfatia	
2018	Mitron	Richa's Father	
2018	Heartbeats	Harindar Zinta	
2019	Mission Mangal	Reporter Durgesh Swami	
2019	377 Ab Normal	Mukul Rastogi	
2020	Sadak 2	Commissioner Rajesh Puri	
2020	London Confidential	RK Goyal, JT's Secretary	
2021	Squad	Abhay Bhatnagar	
2021	Urf Ghanta	Stranger	
2022	Life's Good		
2023	The Vaccine War	Dr. Raman Gangakhedkar	
2023	The Marvels	Yusuf Khan	English film

=== Television ===
Year	Title	Role	Notes	Ref.
1992–1994	Saanp Seedi	Host		
1995–1997	Surf Wheel of Fortune	Host		
1995	Philips Top 10	Host		
1996	O Daddy			
1996–1999	Hip Hip Hurray	Rajan		
1999	Saturday Suspense	Amar Chopra		
2002–2004	Kittie Party	Reva's Brother-in-law		
2008	Zindagi Badal Sakta Hai Hadsaa	Manoviraj Singh		
2010	CID	Jeevan	Episodic role in episode 612	
2010	Ishaan	Nakul Sachdev		
2010	100% De Dana Dan	Ring Announcer		
2010	Kitani Mohabbat Hai 2	Rudra Pratap Singhania		
2012	Hum Ne Li Hai Shapath	Mr. Yashvardhan		
2012–2013	Amrit Manthan	Mr. Oberoi		
2014	Everest	Major Sameer Khanna		
2017–2018	Savitri Devi College & Hospital	Dr. Anand Malhotra		
2018	Table No. 5		ZEE5 original series	
2019	Hostages	Subramanian		
2019	Only for Singles	KRK		
2020	Black Widows	Lalit	Web series	
2021	Crime Next Door			
2022	Ms. Marvel	Yusuf Khan	Main role; Disney+ miniseries	
2024	Karmma Calling	Nikhil Setia	Disney+ web series	
2025	Daredevil: Born Again	Yusuf Khan	Disney+ series; episode: "With Interest"	
2026	Hunkkaar	MD Sada	JioHotstar series	

== Dubbing roles ==
=== Live action films ===
Film title	Actor	Character	Dub language	Original language	Original release	Dub release	Notes	Ref.
Live Free or Die Hard	Bruce Willis	John McClane	Hindi	English	2007	2007		
Race to Witch Mountain	Dwayne Johnson	Jack Bruno	Hindi	English	2009	2009	Titled Res Tisari Duniya Tak in Hindi.	
G.I. Joe: The Rise of Cobra	Dennis Quaid	General Hawk	Hindi	English	2009	2009		
X-Men: First Class	Kevin Bacon	Sebastian Shaw	Hindi	English	2011	2011		
Captain America: The First Avenger	Hugo Weaving	Johann Schmidt / Red Skull	Hindi	English	2011	2011		
The Dark Knight Rises	Tom Hardy	Bane	Hindi	English	2012	2012		
Fast & Furious 6	Dwayne Johnson	Luke Hobbs	Hindi	English	2013	2013		
Furious 7	Dwayne Johnson	Luke Hobbs	Hindi	English	2015	2015		
The Fate of the Furious	Dwayne Johnson	Luke Hobbs	Hindi	English	2017	2017		
Green Lantern	Mark Strong	Sinestro	Hindi	English	2011	2011		
The Sorcerer's Apprentice	Nicolas Cage	Balthazar Blake	Hindi	English	2010	2010		
The Karate Kid	Jackie Chan	Mr. Han	Hindi	English	2010	2010		
Rush Hour 2	Don Cheadle	Kenny (uncredited cameo)	Hindi	English	2001	2011		
The Green Hornet	Christoph Waltz	Bloodnofsky	Hindi	English	2011	2011		
Tron: Legacy	Jeff Bridges	Kevin Flynn / Clu	Hindi	English	2010	2010		
Exodus: Gods and Kings	John Turturro	Seti I	Hindi	English	2014	2014		
Jurassic World	Vincent D'Onofrio	Vic Hoskins	Hindi	English	2015	2015		
Priest	Karl Urban	Black Hat	Hindi	English	2011	2011		
The Wolverine	Haruhiko Yamanouchi	Ichirō Yashida	Hindi	English	2013	2013		
Assassin's Creed	Jeremy Irons	Alan Rikkin	Hindi	English	2016	2016		
Doctor Strange	Benedict Cumberbatch	Dr. Stephen Strange	Hindi	English	2016	2016		
Thor: Ragnarok	Benedict Cumberbatch	Dr. Stephen Strange	Hindi	English	2017	2017		
Avengers: Infinity War	Benedict Cumberbatch	Dr. Stephen Strange	Hindi	English	2018	2018		
Avengers: Endgame	Benedict Cumberbatch	Dr. Stephen Strange	Hindi	English	2019	2019		
Spider-Man: No Way Home	Benedict Cumberbatch	Dr. Stephen Strange	Hindi	English	2021	2021		
Alita: Battle Angel	Christoph Waltz	Dr. Dyson Ido	Hindi	English	2019	2019		
I	Himself	Sushil	Hindi	Tamil	2015	2015		
Why Him?	Bryan Cranston	Ned Flemming	Hindi	English	2016	2016		
Leo	Gautham Vasudev Menon	Joshy Andrews	Hindi	Tamil	2023	2023		
The Marvels	Himself	Yusuf Khan	Hindi	English	2023	2023		

=== Animated films ===
Film title	Original Voice(s)	Character(s)	Dub Language	Original Language	Original Year release	Dub Year release
Rio	George Lopez	Rafael	Hindi	English	2011	2011
Rio 2	George Lopez	Rafael	Hindi	English	2014	2014
The Angry Birds Movie	Peter Dinklage	Mighty Eagle	Hindi	English	2016	2016
The Angry Birds Movie 2	Peter Dinklage	Mighty Eagle	Hindi	English	2019	2019

=== TV series ===
Series title	Original Actor	Character(s)	Dub Language	Original Language	Original Year release	Dub Year release	Notes
Jack Ryan	Wendell Pierce	James Greer	Hindi	English	2018–2023	2018–2023	Amazon Original Series
Ms. Marvel	Himself	Yusuf Khan	Hindi	English	2022	2022	Disney+ miniseries
Daredevil: Born Again	Himself	Yusuf Khan	Hindi	English	2025	2025	Disney+ miniseries

== See also ==
- Dubbing (filmmaking)
- List of Indian dubbing artists
