= List of Dr Lee Jong-wook Memorial Prize for Public Health recipients =

This is a list of recipients of the Dr Lee Jong-wook Memorial Prize for Public Health awarded by the World Health Organization.

Established in 2008 in memory of Lee Jong-wook (1945–2006) to celebrate outstanding contributions to public health that went beyond the call of normal duties. The prize consists of a plaque and a sum of money which will not exceed US$100,000.

== List of recipients ==
Yearmail	Name	Country
2009	Infectious Diseases, AIDS and Clinical Immunology Research Center	Georgia
2010	Action for Aids (AfA)	Singapore
2011	Clodomiro Picado Research Institute	Costa Rica
2012	Pacific Leprosy Foundation	New Zealand
2013	An Dong	China
2013	Diabetes Society of Maldives	Maldives
2014	Sinata Koulla-Shiro	Cameroon
2014	Czech Society of Cardiology	Czech Republic
2015	Thalassemia International Federation	Cyprus
2016	Alireza Mesdaghinia	Iran
2017	The Henry Reeve International Medical Brigade	Cuba
2018	Nazni Wasi Ahmad	Malaysia
2019	Balram Bhargava	India
2019	The Health Promotion Unit of the Department of Public Health	Myanmar
2020	João Aprigio Guerra de Almeida	Brazil
2020	The Sickle Cell Disease Consortium	Tanzania
2021	National Research Center for Radiation Medicine (NRCRM)	Ukraine
2022	Prakit Vathesatogkit	Thailand
2022	Severe Hypothermia Treatment Centre	Poland
2023	Jorge Francisco Meneses	Guatemala
2024	Bader Al-Rawahi	Oman
