= Priya Abraham =

Indian virologist and researcher

Dr. Priya Abraham
- Born: Kottayam district, Kerala, India
- Education: MD and PhD, Christian Medical College Vellore
- Scientific career
- Fields: Virology, Medicine

Priya Abraham is an Indian scientist, medical doctor and one of the leading virologists in the country. She is known for her contributions in the field of testing techniques and genome studies of the COVID-19 virus SARS-CoV-2. Priya has served as the director of the National Institute of Virology, Pune. Her team came across the first sample of COVID-19 virus in India and isolated it.

== Biography ==
Dr. Abraham hails from the Kottayam district in Kerala. She earned her MD and PhD in biology from Christian Medical College Vellore (CMC) in 1981. She was the head of the Clinical virology section at CMC and was first interested in hepatitis and human papillomaviruses. She has worked on committees for several viral infections at CMC and as a consultant for the World Health Organization on numerous viral infections. She has also served on the Indian Council of Medical Research's Scientific Advisory Committee. She has also participated in national viral infection surveillance research.

Dr. Abraham took over the director role at the ICMR-National Institute of Virology, Pune just two months before the outbreak of COVID-19 in India. She and her team made it possible for India to make significant progress in the direction of containing the spread of the virus by managing the logistics of transporting the testing kits to various testing labs and keeping an eye on any new emerging variants. In September 2023, she was elected as fellow of the Indian National Science Academy.
