= Balram Bhargava =

Indian cardiologist, science administrator

- Born: 1961 (age 64–65); Lucknow, India
- Occupation: Cardiologist

Balram Bhargava is an Indian physician scientist, cardiologist, medical educationist, and innovator. He is the chief of Cardiothoracic Centre, AIIMS. He is the former director general at the Indian Council of Medical Research, New Delhi and secretary of the Department of Health Research; a division under Ministry of Health and Family Welfare, Government of India.

== Biography ==
Balram Bhargava was born in 1961 in Lucknow. He did his schooling from La Martiniere College, Lucknow. He graduated in medicine (MBBS), followed by MD and DM with specialization in Cardiology from King George’s Medical College, Lucknow. Prior to his appointment at ICMR, he was a professor of cardiology at the All India Institute of Medical Sciences, New Delhi (AIIMS). He is a fellow of the National Academy of Sciences, India (FNASc), Fellow of the American Heart Association (FAHA), Fellow of the Academy of Medical Sciences (FAMS), Fellow of the National Academy of Medical Sciences and a Fellow of the American College of Cardiology (FACC).

Balram resides at the AIIMS residential complex at Asiad Village, New Delhi.

== Social activities ==
Bhargava is reported as a biomedical program administrator from AIIMS Delhi.

Bhargava along with Alok Ray from IIT Delhi under the leadership of then Department of Biotechnology secretary Maharaj Kishan Bhan, initiated the Indian chapter of the Stanford Biodesign and was its co-executive director (India). The organization had set goals to promote innovators of medical technology through fellowships and also to conduct internships and events related to the area. The system was supported by AIIMS, New Delhi and has Stanford University, Indian Institute of Technology, New Delhi, the Indo-US Science and Technology Forum (IUSSTF) and the Ministry of Science and Technology, Government of India as partners. Stanford India Biodesign program ended in 2013.

Since 2008, he has been working with Biodesign Fellows Srinivas Juggu, Jayant Karve and Amit Sharma on a project trying to develop a chest compression device. If this succeeds it will be useful for patients suffering sudden cardiac arrests.

Bhargava has spoken up about the need for better regulation in medical testing. He is one of the team of twelve doctors from India who plan to establish the Society for Less Investigative Medicine (SLIM), an initiative that hopes to combat the excessive commercial practices prevalent in India. SLIM is in the making since 2015 and the members hoped to start activities by 2016. The members of SLIM, when it is established, plan to work towards raising public awareness against the trend of unnecessary tests and excessive medical investigations.

== Publications ==
Some of his co-authored publications include:

- Ramakrishnan Sivasubramanian; Bharat B. Kukreti; Anita Saxena; Nagendra Boopathy S.; Kewal Goswami; Balram Bhargava; Sandeep Seth; Rajnish Juneja; Shyam S. Kothari; Vinay K. Bahl (2011). "Utility of 3-dimensional Echocardiography in Predicting the Immediate Outcome of Percutaneous Transvenous Mitral Commissurotomy". Journal of the American College of Cardiology. 57 (14): E704. doi:10.1016/S0735-1097(11)60704-3.
- Gurpreet S Gulati; Chesnal Arepalli; Sandeep Seth; Rajiv Narang; Balram Bhargava; Sujata Mohanty; Priya Jagia; Sanjiv Sharma; RK Ahuja; Balram Airan (2011). "Cardiac Magnetic Resonance for evaluating early outcomes of stem cell therapy in non-ischemic dilated cardiomyopathy". Journal of Cardiovascular Magnetic Resonance. 13 (1): 288–301. doi:10.1186/1532-429X-13-S1-P288. PMC 3106666.
- Sivasubramanian Ramakrishnan; Chirayu Vyas; Shyam S. Kothari; Balram Bhargava; Bharat Bhooshan Kukreti; Mani Kalaivani; Rajnish Juneja; Sandeep Seth; Anita Saxena; Vinay K. Bahl (2011). "Acute and short-term hemodynamic effects of metoprolol in Eisenmenger syndrome: A preliminary observational study". American Heart Journal. 161 (5): 938–943. doi:10.1016/j.ahj.2011.02.010. PMID 21570526. Archived from the original on 23 February 2016. PDF Full Text

== Awards and recognitions ==
In 2019 Bhargava received the Gujar Mal Science Award 2018. Bhargava is a recipient of S. N. Bose Centenary Award of the Indian Science Congress, Platinum Jubilee Award of the National Academy of Sciences and the Vasvik Award. He has also received Tata Innovation Fellowship for facilitating Biodesign Innovation fellows' work. The Government of India honoured him, in 2014, by awarding him the Padma Shri, the fourth highest civilian award, for his contributions to the field of medicine (cardiology). He is one of the laureates of the 2015 UNESCO-Equatorial Guinea International Prize for Research in the Life Sciences. In 2019, he received the Dr LEE Jong-wook Memorial Prize for Public Health.

== In popular culture ==
- Nana Patekar played Bhargava in the 2023 medical film The Vaccine War.
