= Raman Gangakhedkar =

Scientist

- Born: 1958 (age 67–68); Gangakhed, India
- Education: Johns Hopkins University (MPH); MBBS
- Occupation: Epidemiologist
- Honours: Padma Shri

Raman Gangakhedkar (born 1958) is an Indian public health expert and epidemiologist. He served as Head Scientist of Epidemiology and Communicable Diseases at Indian Council of Medical Research before retiring on 30 June 2020. He is a recipient of the 2020 Padma Shri, the fourth highest civilian award in India.

== Early life and education ==
Raman Gangakhedkar pursued higher studies in public health internationally. He earned a Master of Public Health (MPH) degree from Johns Hopkins Bloomberg School of Public Health (Baltimore, USA), an institution globally renowned for its work in epidemiology and public-health research.

Prior to his MPH, Gangakhedkar completed his medical education in India. obtaining an MBBS degree (Bachelor of Medicine, Bachelor of Surgery), after which he developed an interest in infectious diseases and community health. This early medical training provided him with a strong clinical foundation before specializing in public health, equipping him to address large-scale health challenges at a population level.

During his time at Johns Hopkins University, he was exposed to global public health frameworks and research methodologies, which shaped his later career focusing on disease surveillance, epidemiology, and public-health policy in India. His cross-cultural academic experience helped him bring international best practices to Indian health-care and public-health responses. mentioned in the book Asamanya, Sahaj Suchala Mhanun, written by Sudarshan Rapatwar.

== Career ==
Gangakhedkar worked in several fields after completing his post graduate medical education. He worked in the National Institute of Nutrition, Hyderabad and in the National Institute of Immunohaematology, Mumbai.

In the early 1980s, he began researching HIV/AIDS, at a time when the knowledge of the disease was developing. He worked with the National Institute of Virology and National AIDS Research Institute, Pune. He continued to work in the public sector in HIV/AIDS and was active in developing national policies and patient empowerment. Along with research, he worked with patients at the government-run Kotnis Clinic in Gadikhana, Pune, serving disadvantaged HIV/AIDS patients.

After nearly two decades, he became Director-in-charge of the National AIDS Research Institute. In 2018 he was appointed Head of Epidemiology and Communicable Diseases Wing of the Indian Council of Medical Research.

In his two-year stint with the ICMR, he was active in handling the Nipah virus outbreak and the 2020 coronavirus pandemic.

He was awarded the Padma Shri - the fourth highest civilian award in India - for his service and research in HIV/AIDS.

== Recognition ==
- 1996 Fogarty Fellowship - National Institutes of Health the Johns Hopkins University Baltimore USA
- FXB Fellowship - Francoise Xavier Bagnoud Foundation Switzerland.
- In October 2021, Dr Raman Gangakhedkar, has been named to an expert group launched by the WHO that will examine the origins of emerging and re-emerging of pathogens of epidemic and Pandemic potentials including SARS-CoV-2, the coronavirus that causes COVID-19.
