= Barinthus Biotherapeutics =

Biotechnology company in Oxford, England

Barinthus Biotherapeutics plc
- Type: Public
- Traded as: Nasdaq: BRNS
- Industry: Vaccines; Immunotherapy; Biotechnology
- Founded: 2016; 10 years ago
- Founders: Sarah Gilbert; Adrian V. S. Hill
- Headquarters: Oxford Science Park, Oxford, United Kingdom
- Website: barinthusbio.com

Barinthus Biotherapeutics plc (formerly Vaccitech plc) is a biotechnology company developing immunotherapies for infectious diseases, cancer and autoimmune diseases such as hepatitis B, HPV and prostate cancer. Formerly known as Vaccitech plc, in November 2023 the company announced that it had renamed itself to Barinthus Biotherapeutics plc. As of 2024, the company employs more than 100 people.

== Technology ==
The company's platforms include Chimpanzee Adenovirus Oxford (ChAdOx) and Modified vaccinia Ankara (MVA), two viral vectors which safely mimic viral infection in human cells and elicit antibody and T cell responses to pathogens and tumours, as well as two SNAP synthetic platforms, SNAP-TI (SNAP-Tolerance Immunotherapy) and SNAP-CI (SNAP-Cancer Immunotherapy), previously referred to collectively as SNAPvaxTM.

== History ==
The company was founded in 2016 as a University spin-off by Sarah Gilbert and Adrian V. S. Hill at The Jenner Institute, University of Oxford.

Vaccitech has been financed and supported by M&G Catalyst, Google Ventures (GV), Fosun International, Tencent, Huawei, Sequoia Capital, GeneMatrix, Liontrust Asset Management, Korea Investment Partners and Oxford Sciences Innovation (OSI).

In early 2020, Vaccitech and the University of Oxford co-invented a vaccine for COVID-19 using the ChAdOx platform.

== COVID-19 vaccine ==
In July 2020, it was reported that people in Brazil, South Africa and the US had been recruited to populate the vaccine trials.

In July 2020, Vaccitech scientists reported in The Lancet a "single-blind, randomised controlled trial in five trial sites in the UK of a chimpanzee adenovirus-vectored vaccine (ChAdOx1 nCoV-19) expressing the SARS-CoV-2 spike protein." Several subjects needed prophylactic paracetamol to minimize their adverse reactions.

== Listing on NASDAQ ==
Vaccitech held an initial public offering of shares in 2021, listing on NASDAQ on 30 April 2021.
