= Covaxin =

Vaccine against COVID-19

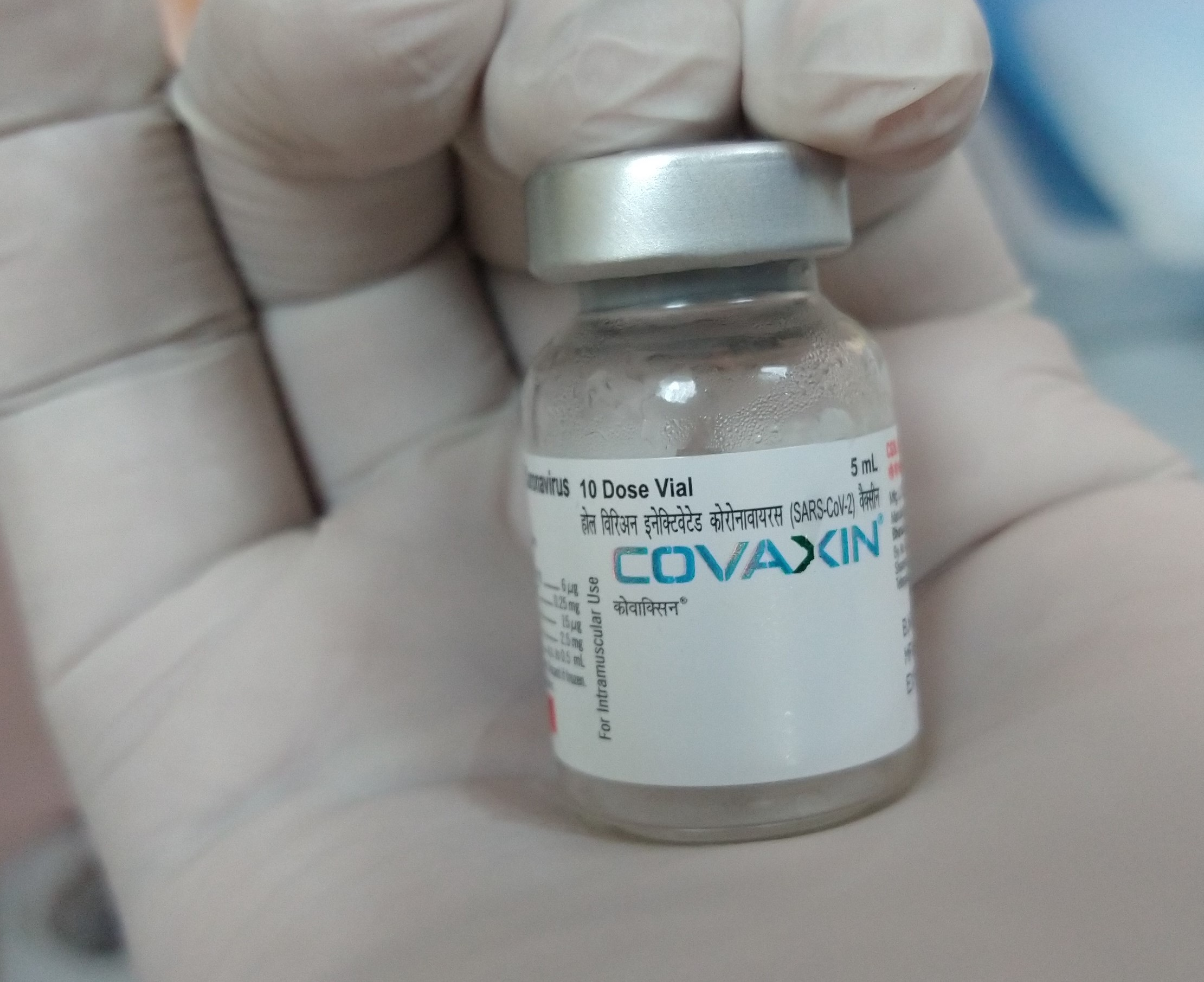
- A vial of Covaxin

Vaccine description
- Target: SARS-CoV-2
- Vaccine type: Inactivated

Clinical data
- Trade names: Covaxin
- Routes of administration: Intramuscular
- ATC code: J07BN03 (WHO)

Legal status
- Legal status: Full list of Covaxin authorizations

Identifiers
- CAS Number: 2501889-19-4
- DrugBank: DB15847
- UNII: 76JZE5DSN6

Covaxin (development name, BBV152) is a whole inactivated virus-based COVID-19 vaccine developed by Bharat Biotech in collaboration with the Indian Council of Medical Research - National Institute of Virology.

On 3 November 2021, the World Health Organization (WHO) validated the vaccine for emergency use, as the first Indian-developed COVID-19 vaccine to be approved. By 31 January 2022, Covaxin had been granted emergency use approval in 13 countries.

== Medical uses ==
=== Effectiveness ===
A vaccine is generally considered effective if the estimate is ≥50% with a >30% lower limit of the 95% confidence interval. Effectiveness is generally expected to slowly decrease over time.

Initial effectiveness by variant
Doses	Severity of illness	Delta
1	Symptomatic	−1% (−51 to 33%) (Note: The confidence interval includes zero, so it is possible that vaccination had no effect.)
1	Hospitalization	Not reported
2	Symptomatic	50% (33–62%)
2	Hospitalization	Not reported

=== Efficacy ===
A phase 3 clinical trial with 25,798 participants found that the vaccine is 64% (95% CI, 29–82%) effective against asymptomatic cases, 78% (65–86%) effective against symptomatic disease, 93% (57–100%) effective against severe disease, and 65% (33–83%) effective against the Delta variant.

== Manufacturing ==
As an inactivated vaccine, Covaxin uses a more traditional technology that is similar to the inactivated polio vaccine. Initially, a sample of SARS-CoV-2 was isolated by India's National Institute of Virology and used to grow large quantities of the virus using vero cells. From then on, the viruses are soaked in beta-propiolactone (BPL), which deactivates them by binding to their genes, while leaving other viral particles intact. The resulting inactivated viruses are then mixed with the aluminium-based adjuvant Alhydroxiquim-II.

The vaccine is produced with Bharat Biotech's in-house vero cell manufacturing platform that has the capacity to deliver about 300 million doses. The company is in the process of setting up a second plant at its Genome Valley facility in Hyderabad to make Covaxin. The firm, in collaboration with the Government of Odisha, is establishing another facility at Odisha Biotech Park in Bhubaneswar to commence Covaxin production by June 2022.

In December 2020, Ocugen entered into a partnership with Bharat Biotech to co-develop and exclusively commercialise Covaxin in the US market; in June 2021, the partnership was extended to cover Canada. In January 2021, Precisa Medicamentos entered into an agreement with Bharat Biotech to supply Covaxin to Brazil. The contract was terminated in July 2021 after the Brazilian government suspended procurement to investigate allegations of irregularities in pricing.

In May 2021, Haffkine Bio-Pharmaceutical Corporation Limited of Haffkine Institute entered into a memorandum of understanding (MoU) with Bharat Biotech and announced that the production of Covaxin by them will commence after obtaining support from the Maharashtra state government and approval from the Indian government whereas Indian Immunologicals Limited (IIL) has signed a commercial agreement with Bharat Biotech for producing the drug substance, a critical component of the vaccine Bharat Immunologicals and Biologicals Corporation (BIBCOL) will also manufacture the vaccine.

On 1 April 2022, Bharat Biotech announced that it was cutting production due to reduction in demand. On 2 April the WHO said that a March 2022 inspection of facilities used to manufacture Covaxin had uncovered good manufacturing practice deficiencies.

== History ==
=== Clinical trials ===
==== Phase I and II trials ====
In May 2020, Indian Council of Medical Research's (ICMR's) National Institute of Virology approved and provided the virus strains for developing an Indian COVID-19 vaccine. In June 2020, the company received permission to conduct Phase I and Phase II human trials of a developmental COVID-19 vaccine codenamed BBV152, from the Drugs Controller General of India (DCGI), Government of India. A total of 12 sites were selected by the Indian Council for Medical Research for Phase I and II randomised, double-blind and placebo-controlled clinical trials of vaccine candidate.

In January 2021, the company published Phase I trial results in The Lancet. On 8 March 2021, Phase II results were published in The Lancet. The study showed that Phase II trials had a higher immune response and induced T-cell response due to the difference in dosing regime from Phase I. The doses in Phase II were given at 4 weeks interval as opposed to 2 weeks in Phase I. Neutralization response of the vaccine were found significantly higher in Phase II.

==== Phase III trials ====
In November 2020, Covaxin received the approval to conduct Phase III human trials after completion of Phase I and II. A randomised, double-blinded, placebo-controlled study among volunteers of age group 18 and above, it started on 25 November and involved around 26,000 volunteers from across 22 sites in India. Refusal rate for Phase III trials was much higher than that for Phase I and Phase II. As a result, only 13,000 volunteers had been recruited by 22 December with the number increasing to 23,000 by 5 January.

Multiple ethical breaches have been reported at one of their trial sites in Bhopal, potentially hampering the quality of overall data.

==== US Immunobridging and booster Phase II/III trial ====
In March 2022, Ocugen registered a Phase 2/3 trial for 400 people in the US to compare the immune responses to those in people in the Indian phase 3 trial, as well as safety and tolerability. The trial also aims to assess the vaccine as a booster after other Covid vaccines used in the US. Ocugen paused Covaxin's bridging trial in April 2022 citing WHO inspection results.

==== Phase IV trials ====
In June 2021, Bharat Biotech announced the start of phase IV trials to evaluate the vaccine's real-world effectiveness. A study of effectiveness and hesitancy study in Healthcare Workers of Max Group of Hospitals at New Delhi from Covaxin and Covishied is under trials.

==== Trials on minors ====
In May 2021, Drugs Controller General of India (DCGI) approved clinical trials in the age group of 2 to 18 years. The trials are conducted at AIIMS Delhi and Patna. As many as 54 children had registered at the AIIMS Patna. In total 525 participants are enrolled in the study as per clinical trial data.

==== Variants ====
In December 2020, the Alpha variant or lineage B.1.1.7, was identified in the UK. An in vitro study on this variant was carried out and preliminary results show Covaxin to be effective in neutralising this strain.

In April 2021, the Indian Council of Medical Research reported that the vaccine has shown promising results in neutralising lineage B.1.617.

In May 2021, a joint investigation by the scientists of the National Institute of Virology, found the vaccine effective in neutralising the Zeta variant or lineage P.2 (previously known as B.1.1.28).

In June 2021, a group of researchers at the National Institute of Virology (NIV) India, collected sera from recovered patients and people who had received the Covaxin. They found the vaccine to be effective in neutralising the Delta (B.1.617.2) and Beta (B.1.351) variants. Later, the US National Institute of Health also approved the findings where the adjuvant used was developed jointly with funding from NIH.

== Authorisations ==
=== India ===
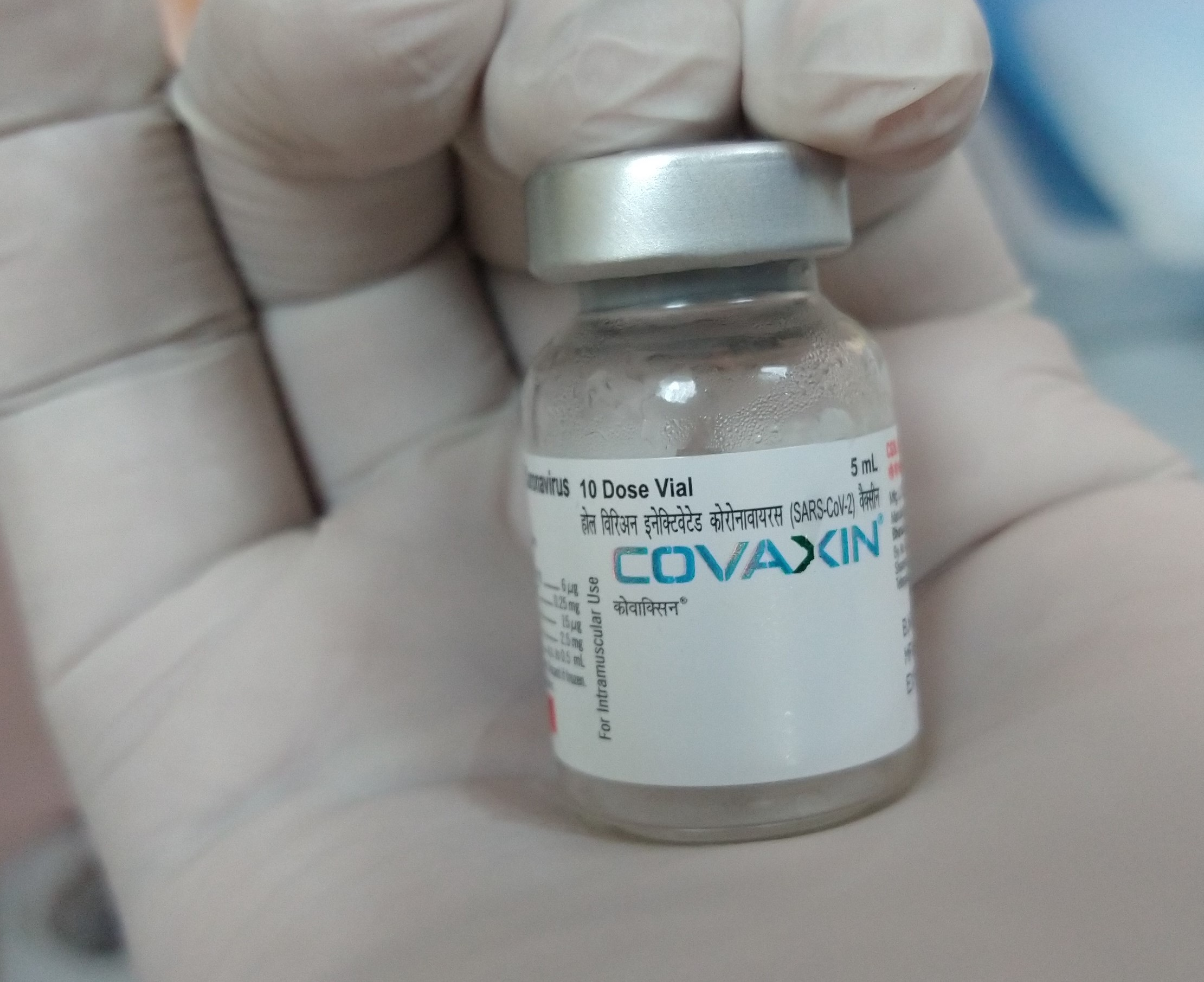
A vial of Covaxin used at a private hospital in Bengaluru, India

On 6 December 2020, Bharat Biotech applied to the Drugs Controller General of India (DCGI), seeking emergency use authorisation. It was the third firm after Serum Institute of India and Pfizer to apply under such provision.

On 2 January 2021, the Central Drugs Standard Control Organisation (CDSCO) recommended permission, which was granted the next day. Covaxin was to be used in a "clinical trial mode" i.e. the public vaccination drive was to be an open-label, single-arm clinical trial in itself. This emergency approval, granted without considering Phase III trial data concerning efficacy and safety, drew widespread criticism. On 12 October 2021, Bharat Biotech's Covaxin got approved for usage on children between 2 and 18 years of age.

=== Other nations ===
The vaccine was also approved for emergency use in Iran and Zimbabwe. Nepal granted EUA for Covaxin on 19 March 2021. On 7 April, Mexico granted emergency authorisation for Covaxin. On 19 April 2021, Philippines granted EUA to Covaxin. Additionally, Covaxin was granted EUA in Guatemala, Nicaragua, Guyana, Venezuela and Botswana.

On 31 March, the Brazilian health regulator Anvisa rejected Bharat Biotech's application for supplying Covaxin in the country due to non-compliance with manufacturing norms. Bharat Biotech stated that they would re-apply after meeting the requirements. On 4 June, Anvisa approved exceptional imports of Covaxin, imposing conditions that restrict it mainly to healthy adults and limiting it to just 1% of the country's population to manage the risks through control and supervision of side effects. Anvisa cited as main concerns the incomplete phase III study, a short 45-day follow-up, which should be 60 days to meet the international consensus, and a novel imidazoquinoline adjuvant that may increase the chance of developing an autoimmune disease. On 30 June, Brazilian regulators suspended the deal and an investigation was opened into it by federal prosecutors to probe accusations of irregularity. Anvisa cancelled an ongoing clinical trial of the vaccine on 26 July and suspended the temporary authorization and the import and distribution permit on 27 July.

Mauritius received its first commercial supply of Covaxin on 18 March 2021.

On 29 March 2021, Paraguay received 100,000 doses of Covaxin.

In June 2021, Argentina agreed to buy 10 million doses of Covaxin and administer them to its citizens.

On 3 November 2021, the World Health Organization (WHO) validated the vaccine for emergency use. A subsequent inspection of manufacturing facilities led WHO to suspend procurement of Covaxin through UN agencies in April 2022.

== See also ==
- BBV154
- Case Covaxin (Brazil)
- COVID-19 vaccination in India
