= National Institute of Virology =

Indian virology research institute

ICMR-National Institute of Virology
- Established: 1952; 74 years ago
- Director: Dr. Naveen Kumar
- Budget: ₹950 crore (US$99 million) (2021-2022)
- Location: Pune, Maharashtra, India
- Website: https://niv.icmr.org.in/

The National Institute of Virology in Pune, India is a virology research institute and part of the Indian Council of Medical Research (ICMR). It was previously known as 'Virus Research Centre' and was founded in collaboration with the Rockefeller Foundation. It has been designated as a WHO H5 reference laboratory for SE Asia region.

The Virus Research Centre (VRC), Pune came into existence in 1952 under the joint auspices of the ICMR and the Rockefeller Foundation, as a part of the global programme of investigations on the arthropod-borne group of viruses. In view of its expanded scope and activities, the VRC was re-designated as the National Institute of Virology (NIV) in 1978.

The NIV is identified today as the WHO Collaborating Centres for arboviruses reference and hemorrhagic fever reference and research. NIV is also the National Monitoring Centre for Influenza, Japanese encephalitis, Rota, Measles, Hepatitis and Coronavirus.

== History ==
The National Institute of Virology is one of the major Institutes of the Indian Council of Medical Research (ICMR). It was established at Pune, Maharashtra, India in 1952 as Virus Research Centre (VRC) under the auspices of the ICMR and the Rockefeller Foundation (RF), USA. It was an outcome of the global programme of the RF for investigating the Arthropod Borne viruses. Since the studies on arboviruses and their arthropod vectors involve most of the basic principles and techniques of general virology, entomology and zoology, these viruses were also considered to be an ideal group, to begin with, for intensive training and research in virology. The RF withdrew its support in 1967 and since then the institute has been funded by the ICMR.

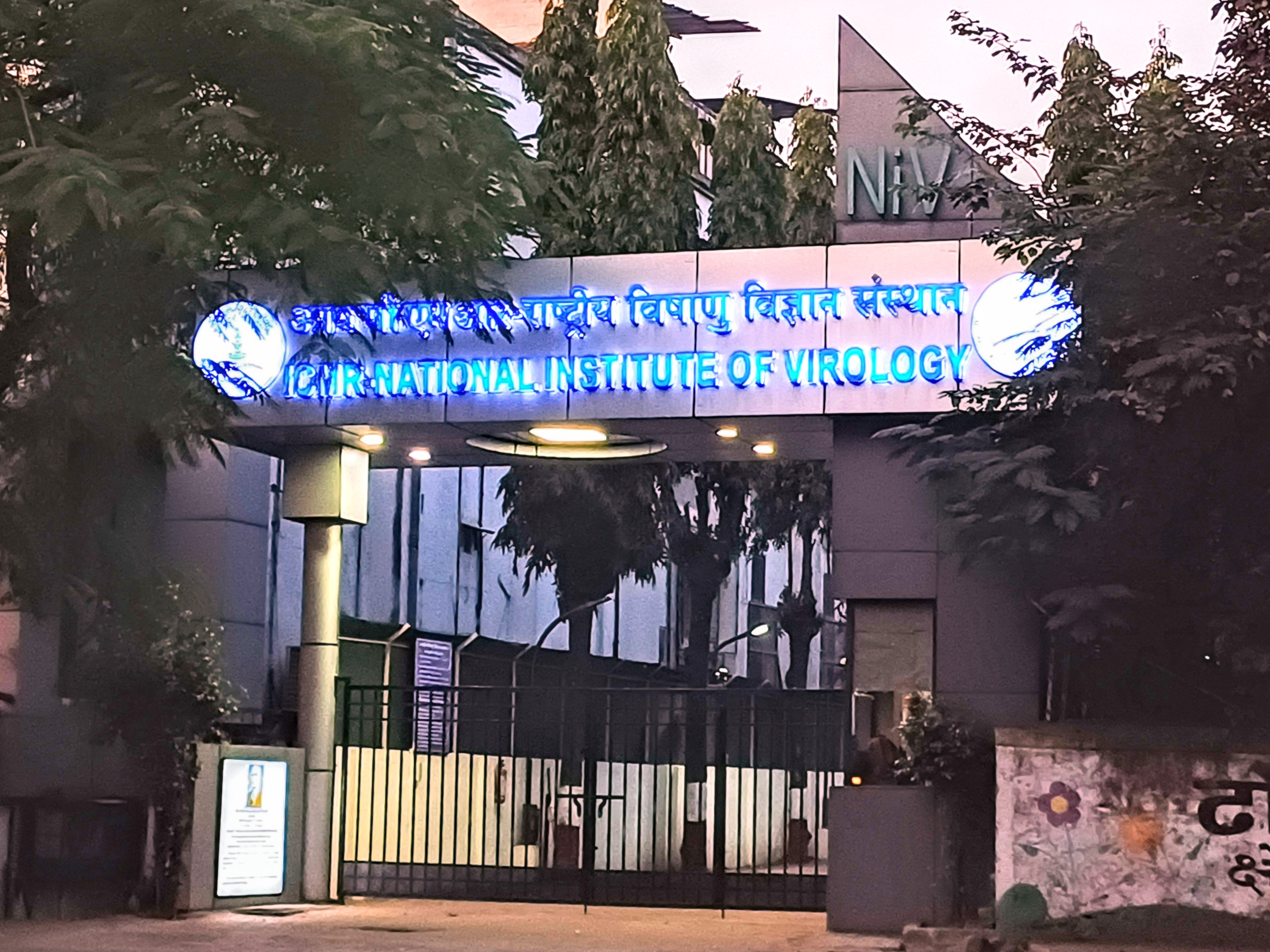
Gate of National Institute of Virology, Pune

The institute was designated as one of the collaborating laboratories of the World Health Organization (WHO) in 1967 and it started functioning as the regional centre of the WHO for South-East Asia for arbovirus studies from 1969. Since 1974, it has been functioning as a WHO collaborating centre for arbovirus reference and research. In 1995 it has been redesignated as the WHO Collaborating Centre for Arbovirus and Haemorrhagic Fever Reference and Research and Rapid Diagnosis of Viral Diseases.

NIV is also the National Centre for Hepatitis and Influenza.It has outstations in Bangalore, Kerala and Mumbai. The field unit of NIV at Bengaluru is one of the centres under National Polio Surveillance Programme conducting surveillance of acute flaccid paralysis cases from Karnataka as a part of Global Polio Eradication Programme of the WHO South-East Asia region since 1997. World Health Organization (WHO) Regional Collaborating Centre for Reference and Research on Arboviruses, Influenza and Measles as well as National Reference Centre for Hepatitis, Avian Influenza and emerging infectious diseases.

The institute conducts an M.Sc. in Virology and a PhD course, under the aegis of the Savitribai Phule Pune University, Pune.

== Departments ==
Research areas include Cell repository, Electron microscopy, Rickettsioses, Hepatitis, Influenza and related viruses, Clinical virology, Biochemistry, Virus registry, and Biostatistics. The research activities of the Institute are coordinated by a Scientific Advisory Committee (SAC).

- Animal House
- Avian Influenza Group
- Bioinformatics Division
- BSL-3 Facility (Polio Essential Facility)
- Central Library Facility
- Dengue & Chikungunya Group
- Diagnostics Group
- Electron Microscopy Group
- Entomology Division
- Hepatitis group
- Influenza group
- Japanese Encephalitis Group
- Outbreak Response Group
- Enteric Virus Group
- VRDL Group
- M.Sc.(Virology)
- BSL4
- Administration
- Engineering

== Achievements ==
On the recommendation of the SAC, the VRC acquired its status of national importance and was renamed as the National Institute of Virology (NIV) in 1978. Subsequently, studies on Acquired Immune Deficiency Syndrome (AIDS), Rotavirus gastroenteritis, acute haemorrhagic conjunctivitis, Rabies, Herpes simplex, Buffalo pox, Measles, and Poliomyelitis were also initiated.

A Microbial Containment Complex (MCC) having P-3 biosafety levels for handling microorganisms of highly infectious nature is being established at Pashan, 11 km off the main laboratory at Pune. The laboratory will provide a National Containment facility for the safe handling of hazardous pathogens.

Landmark achievements

- Isolated the 11 strains of SARS-CoV-2 virus and helped India becoming the fifth country in world to isolate the strain
- First laboratory in the country that developed comprehensive infrastructure facilities like:
  - tissue culture,
  - epidemiology,
  - biochemistry,
  - immunology and
  - medical zoology for research in arbovirology
- Discovery of Kyasanur Forest Disease (KFD) a tick borne viral disease, studying its natural cycle
- Finding of a new genotype of dengue virus
- First institute to confirm the occurrence of many arboviral diseases in India, viz.,
  - Japanese encephalitis (JE),
  - Chikungunya,
  - West Nile,
  - Chandipura,
  - etc.
- Ecological studies to understand the natural cycle of zoonotic viruses like KFD, JE, and Chandipura (CHP) etc.
- Discovered 22 new viruses; a few have been characterized fully, while others are partially characterized or unrecognized. Recently, isolated and characterized a novelvirus “Malsoor”, from frugivorous bats, belonging to Phleobovirus family.
- Pioneering effort in outbreak and pandemic investigations and establishment of research group in Epidemiology. Over 250 epidemics investigated.
- Conducted numerous serological surveys to create background information on prevalence of viral diseases in India.
- Invaluable collection of sera and virus strains: Approx. 260,000 serum samples and >600 strains of viruses isolated from humans, animals and arthropods.
- Discovered new species of arthropods: One new species of mosquito, 2 species of sand flies, 14 species of sucking lice, 2 species of fleas, 3 species of bugs, 18 species of ticks and 63 species of trombiculid mites.
- Discovered one new species each of rodent and bat; and a subspecies of bird.
- Developed the first mosquito cell line in the world: popularly called ‘the Singh's cell line’, a clone of which is now known as C6/36 (clone developed by A Igarashi), is used extensively for arboviral studies. Many new cell lines were also developed from fish and arthropods subsequently.
- Developed Monoclonal antibodies against JE, Dengue, WN, Chikungunya, Influenza and respiratory syncytial viruses (RSV).
- Developed indigenous ELISA for detection of JE, Dengue, WN, CHP, Hepatitis A, B, E, Rota, Measles and Crimean Congo Hemorrhagic Fever (CCHF) viruses
- First visualization of Hepatitis E virus particles, confirmation of the virus as the causative agent of water bore hepatitis, characterization of clinical, epidemiological and immunological parameters for development of a candidate vaccine. (Technology ready for transfer to Industry).
- Epidemiology and characterization of Hepatitis viruses, development of vaccines and diagnostic reagents.
- Genotyping of important viruses like JE, WN, Dengue, Hepatitis, Measles, RSV etc.
- Establishment of multisite Influenza surveillance network in 2004. Isolated numerous strains of influenza A and B viruses from humans and animals.
- Establishment of Avian Influenza Department for investigation of Avian Influenza in India (2006) and pandemic Influenza investigation and policy making in 2009.
- First detection of human meta-pneumovirus from acute pneumonia cases in India.
- Discovered Chandipura virus involvement in encephalitis outbreaks in children in India.
- Isolation of several strains of Rotaviruses. Established the utility of immune goat colostrum for prevention of diarrhea.
- Vaccine trials for JE, KFD, measles, hepatitis etc.
- Bangalore unit has been accredited as National Laboratory for Karnataka under National Polio Surveillance Program (NPSP) since 1997. In addition Gorakhpur and Kerala units have also been established.
- Recently, played an important role in providing diagnostic services, training and support in developing a country-wide network for diagnostic facility and various national documents.
- Development of an inactivated KFD vaccine for public health (Technology transferred to Karnataka state).
- Development of an inactivated JE vaccine for public health (Technology transferred to Industry).
- Establishment of Biosafety Level-4 laboratory dedicated for virus research. This is the first high tech laboratory in Asia.

Thrust Areas in viral diseases of public health importance

- Identification, characterization of etiological agent of outbreaks / epidemics
- Development of newer & rapid diagnostics
- Establishment of surveillance & monitoring systems
- Molecular epidemiology of viruses of public health
- Development of vaccines and immunotherapeutics
- Manpower development in Virology: M.Sc. Virology, Short term training courses in Diagnostic virology, Animal tissue culture, Interferon assays, Medical Entomology etc.

== See also ==
- Indian Council of Medical Research
