= COVID-19 pandemic in Bihar =

Ongoing COVID-19 viral pandemic in Bihar, India

- Disease: COVID-19
- Pathogen: SARS-CoV-2
- Location: Bihar
- First outbreak: Wuhan, China
- Index case: Munger
- Arrival date: 22 March 2020 (6 years, 6 months and 4 days)
- Confirmed cases: 62,031 (4 August 2020)
- Active cases: 20,922
- Recovered: 40,760 (4 August 2020)
- Deaths: 349 (4 August 2020)
- Fatality rate: 0.56%
- Territories: 38 Districts

Government website
- Official website www.mohfw.gov.in

The first COVID-19 case in the Indian state of Bihar was reported in Munger on 22 March 2020, a 38-year-old tested positive for COVID-19, he was also the first victim. He had travel history to Qatar. The Ministry of Health and Family Welfare has confirmed a total of 72547 cases as of 4 August 2020, including 20,922 active cases, 9647 deaths and 40,760 recoveries. The virus has spread in 38 districts of the state, of which Patna district has the highest number of cases.

The state has been under lockdown since 25 March 2020. The state government has responded to the outbreak by following a contact-tracing, testing, and home-to-home surveillance model.

The state began witnessing a spike in the number of COVID-19 cases as migrant workers and many people of Bihar stranded in other parts of the country returned to the state. Many of them tested positive for the coronavirus when they arrived, and were quarantined.

Bihar's COVID case fatality rate is one of the lowest in the nation. The recovery rate in the state, 76, is also better than the national average.

== Timeline ==
- Bihar reported its first case on 22 March 2020.
- Bihar reported its first 100 cases on 20 April 2020. It took almost 1 month to reach the 100th case.
- Bihar reported 1,000 cases on 14 May 2020.
- Bihar reported 5,000 cases on 8 June 2020.
- Bihar reported 5,000 recoveries on 19 June 2020.
- Bihar reported 10,000 cases on 1 July 2020.
- On 10 July 2020, Bihar reported 10,000 recoveries.

=== April ===
- Highest number of cases reported on 27 April 2020. The total new cases reported were 69.
- Up to 27 April total home screened by health workers is 7459917.
- On 28 April total 19 new cases reported and 7 recovered.
- On 28 April Corona spread to 27 districts including 2 new districts.
- Total testing done until 28 April is 19790.
- Till 28 April total 6 Government lab is functional for testing in Bihar. Four labs in Patna and 1 lab each in Muzaffarpur and Darbhanga.
- On 29 April total 26 new cases reported and 1 recovered. Corona spread to two more districts.
- On 30 April total 22 new cases reported and a total of 19 people recovered.

=== May ===
- On 1 May 2020, 41 new cases, 1 death, and 14 recoveries were reported, and the coronavirus spread to another district, Katihar.
- On 2 May 2020, 16 new cases, 1 death, and 26 recoveries were reported.
- On 3 May 2020, 35 new cases, 7 recoveries were reported and the virus spread to another district, Sheohar.
- On 4 May 2020, 8 new cases and 5 recoveries were reported.
- On 5 May 2020, total 7 new cases and 33 recoveries were reported.
- On 6 May 2020, total 7 new cases, 28 people recovered.
- On 7 May 2020, total 8 new cases, 58 people recovered and corona spread to one more district.
- On 8 May 2020, total 19 news cases, 49 people recovered Corona spread to 4 more districts: Supaul, Saharsa, Kishanganj, and Khagaria.
- On 9 May 2020, 41 new cases and 51 recoveries were report, the virus spread to another district, Muzaffarpur.
- On 10 May 2020, 96 new cases, 40 recoveries and 1 death was reported. 3 private labs were approved by the government for COVID-19 testing.
- On 11 May 2020, 54 new cases were reported.
- On 12 May 2020, 118 new cases were reported.
- On 17 May 2020, 148 cases were reported, the highest on a single day at that point.

=== June ===
- On 13 June 2020, 370 recoveries were recorded.
- On 18 June 2020, 5 deaths were reported.
- On 25 June 2020, 374 recoveries were reported.

=== July ===
- On 6 July 2020, 7 deaths were reported.
- On 10 July 2020, 11 deaths and 459 recoveries were reported.

=== August, September, and beyond ===
Starting from mid-August, cases slowly started to drop, and the state re-opened by early-March.

However, after Holi on 29 March 2021, cases started to rise quickly again, the government imposed new restrictions on 3 April 2021, and tightened them on 9 April 2021. On 11 April 2021, Bihar reported 3,756 new cases and 12 deaths. Active cases on that day jumped to 14,695, of which half were reported in the past 48 hours. 1,91,352 people were vaccinated on 11 April 2021, with the cumulative number of vaccinations standing at 50,01,448.

On 4 May 2021, Chief Minister Nitish Kumar announced that the state will go into a lockdown until 15 May 2021. The government extended the lockdown until 25 May 2021, on 13 May 2021.

== Response ==
=== Zones ===
To tackle the outbreak of coronavirus in an effective and structured manner, Ministry of Health and Family Welfare, has classified the country's districts in three different zones; Red, Orange, and Green, based on the severity of outbreak in those areas.

The following is the list of districts of Bihar classified in their respective zones

| S.No. | Zones | Districts |
|---|---|---|
| 1. | Red (Hotspot) | Munger, Patna, Rohtas, Buxar, Gaya |
| 2. | Orange (Non-Hotspot) | Kaimur, Nalanda, Siwan, Bhojpur, Begusarai, Aurangabad, East Champaran, Madhubani, Bhagalpur, Arwal, Saran, Gopalganj, Nawada, Lakhisarai, Banka, Vaishali, Darbhanga, Jehanabad, Madhepura, Purnia, Muzaffarpur, Sheikhpura, Araria, Jamui, Katihar, Khagaria, Kishanganj, Pashchim Champaran, Saharsa, Samastipur, Sheohar, Sitamarhi, Supaul |
| 3. | Green (COVID-19 free) | |

=== Testing Centres ===
As of 10 May 2020, the state has 10 laboratories (7 government labs and 3 private labs) approved by ICMR for testing. Till 9 May, no private labs were approved to do COVID-19 testing in Bihar. On 10 May Bihar health department has permitted 2 private labs to collect samples and test for COVID-19. The rate of testing has been fixed and that is 4500 rs.

- On 15 May 1 more government lab approved to do COVID-19 testing.
- On 16 May 1 more government lab approved to do COVID-19 testing.
- On 18 May 3 more government lab approved to do COVID-19 testing.
- On 19 May 2 more government lab approved to do COVID-19 testing.
- On 20 May 1 more government lab approved to do COVID-19 testing.
- On 21 May 1 more government lab approved to do COVID-19 testing. With that total testing center in Bihar reached 19(16 government lab and 3 private labs).

| | COVID-19 Testing Centers in Bihar | | | | |
| No. | Institute | City | Testing facility started on | Type | Address\Detail |
|---|---|---|---|---|---|
| 1 | RMRIMS | Patna | 7 March 2020 | Government | |
| 2 | IGIMS | Patna | 25 March 2020 | Government | |
| 3 | DMCH | Darbhanga | 2 April 2020 | Government | |
| 4 | PMCH | Patna | 6 April 2020 | Government | |
| 5 | SKMCH | Muzaffarpur | 13 April 2020 | Government | |
| 6 | AIIMS | Patna | 15 April 2020 | Government | |
| 7 | JLNMCH | Bhagalpur | 3 May 2020 | Government | |
| 8 | Dr. Lal Path Labs | Online | 10 May 2020 | Private | Website: www.lalpathlabs.com, Mobile Number: 8527483085 |
| 9 | Path Kind Diagnostics Pvt. Ltd | Patna | 10 May 2020 | Private | Mobile Number: 7827949761/ 7827949762 |
| 10 | Path Kind Diagnostics Pvt. Ltd | Muzaffarpur | 10 May 2020 | Private | Mobile Number: 7827949750 |
| 11 | VIMS | Pawapuri | 15 May 2020 | Government | |
| 12 | District hospital | Siwan | 16 May 2020 | Government | |
| 13 | JKTMCH | Madhepura | 18 May 2020 | Government | |
| 14 | GMC | Bettiah | 18 May 2020 | Government | |
| 15 | ANMMCH | Gaya | 18 May 2020 | Government | |
| 16 | District hospital | Munger | 19 May 2020 | Government | |
| 17 | TBDC | Motiihari | 19 May 2020 | Government | |
| 18 | JLNMCH | Bhagalpur | 20 May 2020 | Government | |
| 19 | District Hospital | Rohtas | 21 May 2020 | Government | |

==== Testing Summary ====
Summary of test results
| Samples tested | 687,154 |
| Tests per 1 million people | 5,749 |
| Positive per 100 Tests | 9 |
| Tested negative | 625,123 |
| Tested positive | 62,031 |
| Results Awaited | - |
| Active Case | 20,922 |
| Recovery Rate | 66 |

Total tests done is 687,154 as per 31 July 21,271 reported active, 349 decreased and 40760 people recovered.

=== Public Health Strategy ===
==== Government Quarantine Facility ====
In late March, as migrants workers started returning to Bihar, the state government imposed mandatory 14 days quarantining at government relief camps. Initially in late May, the state government created three layers of quarantining:

| Category | Level | Source |
|---|---|---|
| A | Block | 11 cities: Surat, Ahmedabad, Mumbai, Delhi, Pune, Ghaziabad, Faridabad, Gurgram, Noida, Kolkata, and Bangalore |
| B | Panchayat | UP, MP, Rajasthan and Haryana (except some towns) |
| C | Village | Elsewhere |

But within days, the government changed strategy to only have returnee migrants from category A (Block level) be mandatorily put in institutional quarantine, while the rest were sent for home quarantine if found asymptomatic. The camps were closed down on 15 June and the last registration for institutional quarantining took place on 1 June. The reason given for this was that reportedly the last batch of migrant workers came back on 1 June and the ones who came to Bihar after that aren't necessary returnee migrant workers. The other reasons was that most of these camps operated out of schools, which needed to be vacated as the government planned to reopen schools in July. As of 14 June, there were 288 Block Quarantine Camps with a total of 15,33,392 persons registered for quarantining.

While operational, these camps provided three meals a day to them, as well as a minimum financial assistance of ₹1,000. To combat rapid population growth, the state government also provided kits containing condoms, contraceptives, and pregnancy tests to the discharged migrants. As of 10 June, 17 lakh condoms were distributed to the migrants.

==== High-level Multi-disciplinary Central Teams ====
Bihar is one of the 15 states and Union Territories which will get technical support and administrative hand-holding from the Ministry of Health and Family Welfare through central teams composed of two public health experts, epidemiologists, clinicians and a senior Joint Secretary level nodal officer. The central team will assist the health department of the state government in implementing containment measures and management of clinical cases. The team will also improve coordination between the state government, and the district and municipal level authorities for public health response on the field.

=== Economic Strategy ===
==== Garib Kalyan Rojgar Abhiyaan ====
This central scheme will be launched in six states, including Bihar, on 20 June 2020 from Telihar village of Khagaria district of Bihar. 32 districts in Bihar will be part of the scheme. This scheme will provide employment opportunities to both rural workers and returnee migrant workers, and develop rural infrastructure. Under the scheme, 25 different types of work will be provided under mission mode. 12 different central government ministries and departments will be involved in this scheme: Rural Development, Panchayati Raj, Road Transport & Highways, Mines, Drinking Water & Sanitation, Environment, Railways, Petroleum & Natural Gas, New & Renewable Energy, Border Roads, Telecom and Agriculture.

The scheme will be launched in the following districts:

East Champaran, West Champaran, Muzaffarpur, Vaishali, Darbhanga, Purnia, Gaya, Madhubani, Araria, Saran, Rohtas, Samastipur, Banka, Khagaria, Begusarai, Supaul, Bhagalpur, Saharsa, Aurangabad, Buxar, Kishanganj, Madhepura, Sitamarhi, Bhojpur, Siwan, Patna, Nalanda, Gopalganj, Jamui, Nawada and Kaimur.

==== State Government Response ====
The Bihar government has mapped the skills of more than 17 lakhs of migrant-labourers and has engage more than 6 to 7 lakhs of them in different schemes employment schemes.

== Impact ==
=== Migrant Workers Crisis ===
Observing the situation of workers throughout the country, the central government and Indian railway decided to run the "Shramik Special" between states to help workers to reach their home state. Till 13 May over 169 Shramik special train reached Bihar different city from other states.

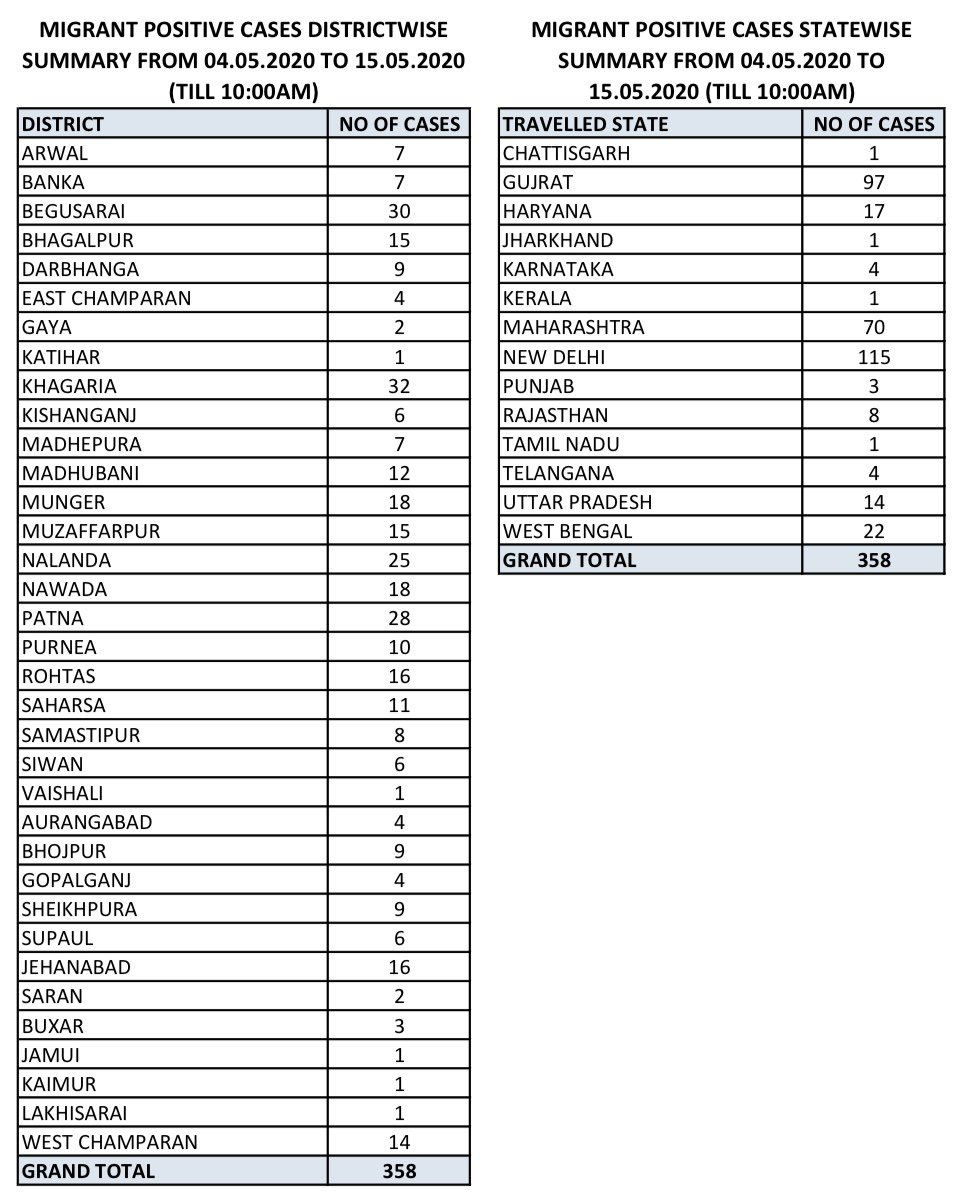
Migrant worker cases between 4 May to 15 May

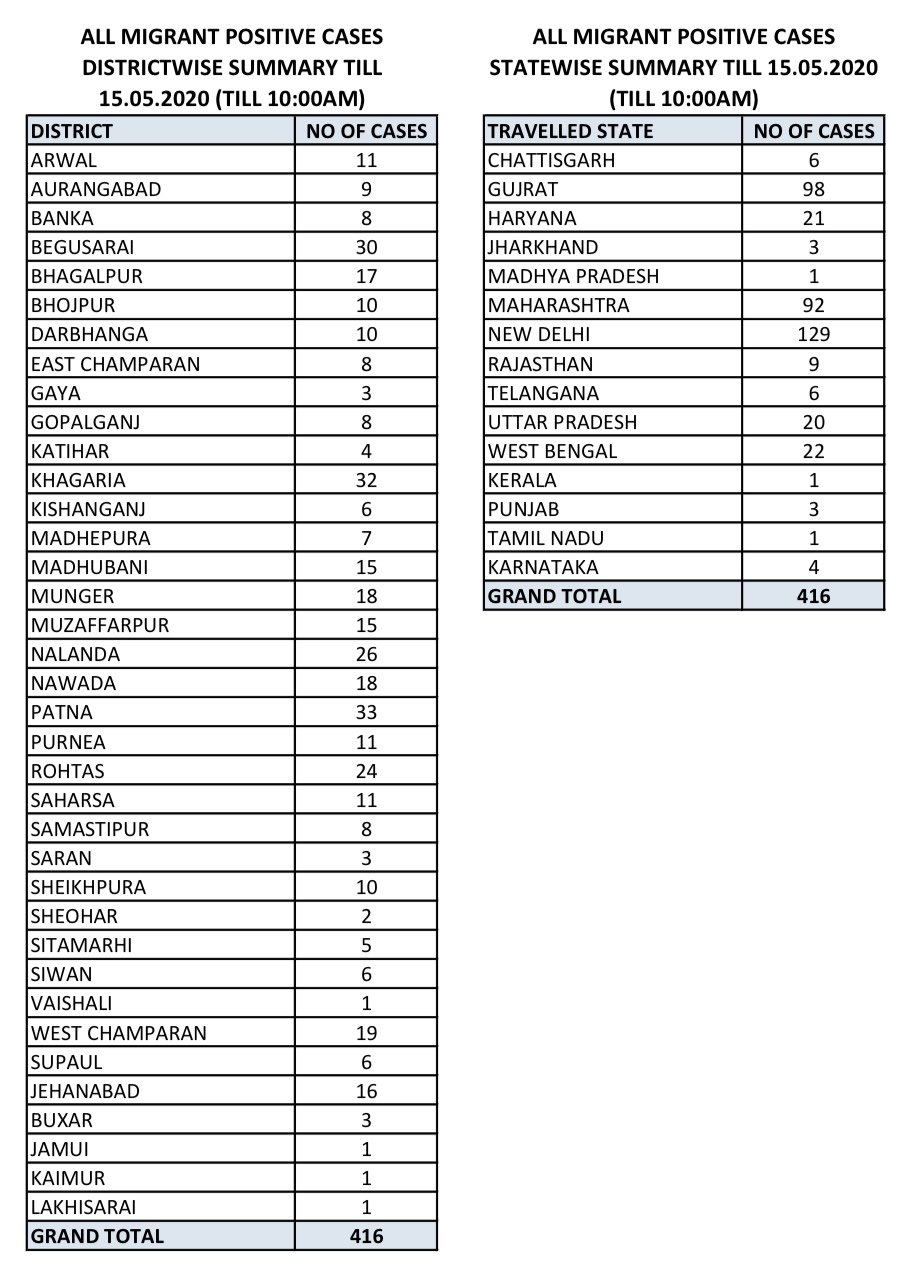
Migrant worker cases till 15 May.

Bihar health department release data on 15 May about total cases related to the migrant workers.

- Total Migrant positive case report 358 from 4 May to 15 May.
- Total 416 migrant positive case reported until 15 May.

== Statistics ==
=== Map Statistics ===
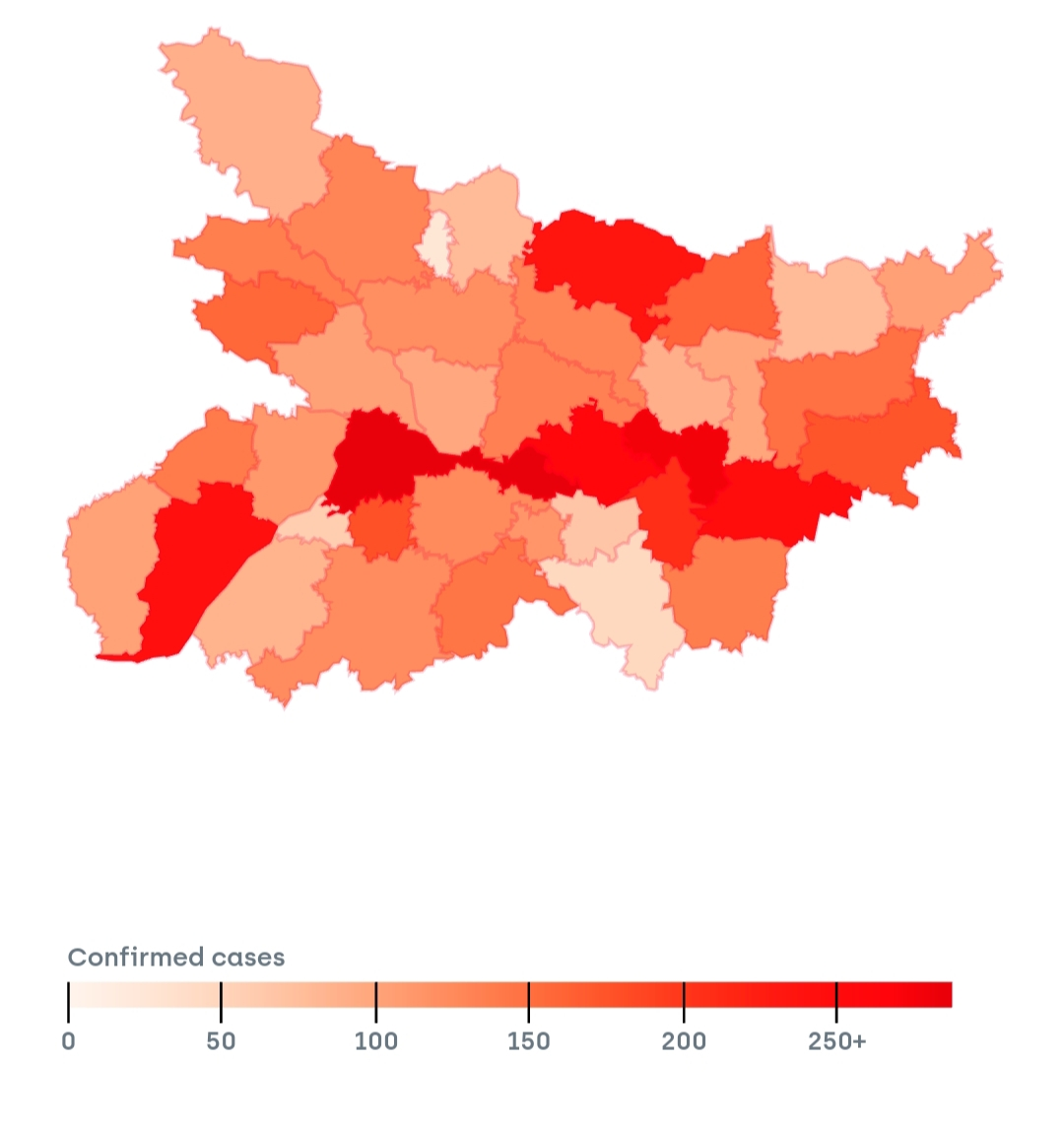
Confirmed Cases as of 9 June 2020

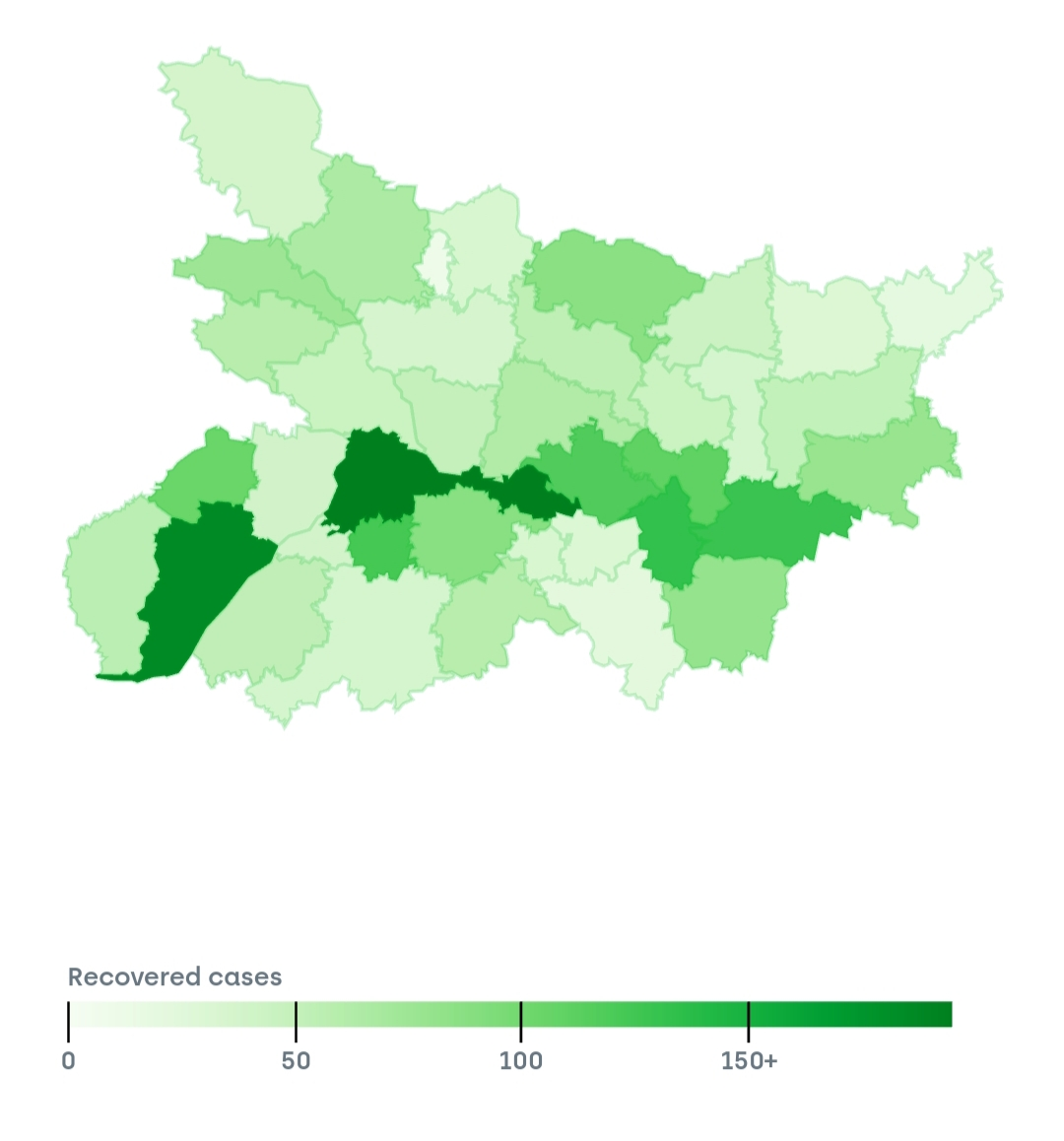
Recovered Cases as of 9 June 2020

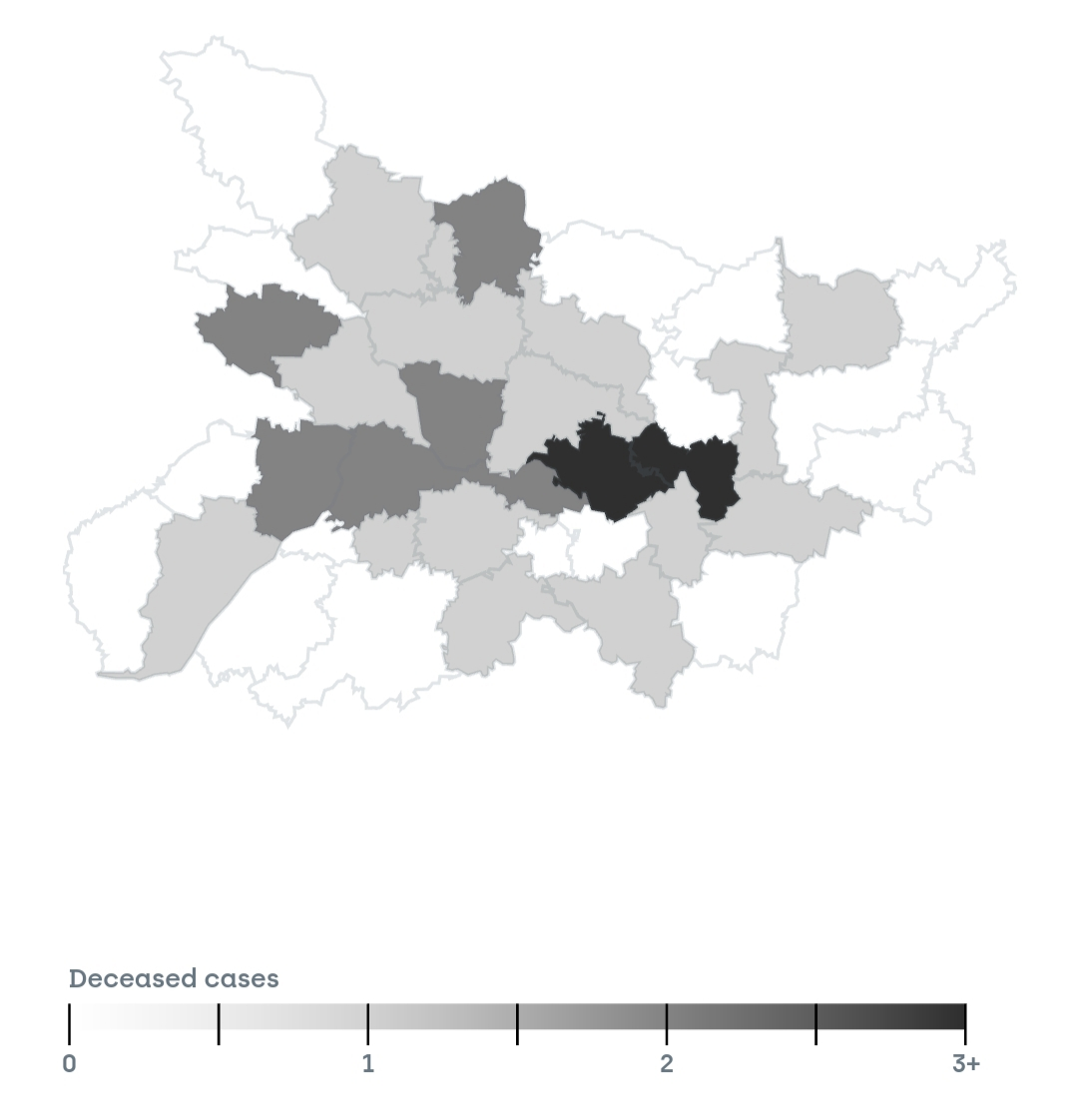
No. Of Deaths as of 9 June 2020

== See also ==
- COVID-19 pandemic in India
- Timeline of the COVID-19 pandemic in India
- COVID-19 pandemic in Assam
- COVID-19 pandemic in Delhi
- COVID-19 pandemic in Goa
- COVID-19 pandemic in Gujarat
- COVID-19 pandemic in Haryana
- COVID-19 pandemic in Karnataka
- COVID-19 pandemic in Kerala
- COVID-19 pandemic in Madhya Pradesh
- COVID-19 pandemic in Maharashtra
- COVID-19 pandemic in Punjab
- COVID-19 pandemic in Rajasthan
- COVID-19 pandemic in Tamil Nadu
- COVID-19 pandemic in Telangana
- COVID-19 pandemic in Odisha
- COVID-19 pandemic in Uttar Pradesh
- COVID-19 pandemic in Uttarakhand
- COVID-19 pandemic in West Bengal
