= COVID-19 pandemic in Goa =

Ongoing COVID-19 viral pandemic in Goa, India

- Disease: COVID-19
- Pathogen: SARS-CoV-2
- Location: Goa
- First outbreak: Wuhan, China
- First reported: 1422
- Arrival date: 25 March 2020
- Date: 4 July 2020

Government website
- www.goa.gov.in/covid-19/

The first case relating to the COVID-19 pandemic was confirmed in Goa on 25 March 2020. The state has confirmed a total of 10494 cases, of whom 6912 have recovered and 91 died, as of 13 August. The state was COVID-19 free for 23 days until the disease resurfaced on 14 May when a family returning from the neighbouring state of Maharashtra tested positive. The worst impact was felt around September–October 2020, while as of April–May 2021, a second wave of COVID-19 was also felt strongly across the small State.

== Timeline ==
=== March 2020 ===
- On 14 March 2020, the government of Goa announced that the schools and colleges in the state would remain closed until 1 April 2020.
- On 20 March 2020, the government of Goa launched Test Yourself Goa, a self-assessment-tool-for-COVID-19.
- The Chief minister of Goa announced on 23 March that shops selling essential commodities like groceries, milk, vegetables and meat would be open daily from 6am to 11am.
- On 24 March 2020, the government of Goa announced a complete lockdown in Goa until 31 March 2020, and that even grocery stores would be shut.
- Later in the evening on the 24th, the Prime Minister announced a lockdown in the entire country until 14 April 2020.
- The first three positive cases were detected in Goa on 25 March 2020. The three male patients were aged 25, 29 and 55 years and had travelled to Spain, Australia and the US, respectively.
- On 26 March 2020, the Chief Minister announced that shops selling milk, vegetables and fish would be allowed to open from the following day.
- The state government requisitioned two battalions of the CRPF on 28 March to help enforce the lockdown.
- 2 more positive cases were announced as being positive on 29 March 2020. One person had returned from the Bahamas, while the other had been in contact with one of the first three positive patients. Both were Goans, and were already under quarantine.

=== April 2020 ===
- On 3 April, Goa's 6th case was announced. The person had a travel history to Mozambique.
- Goa's 7th case was detected on 4 April. The patient had a foreign travel history.
- All seven persons in Goa have recovered from the COVID-19 infection and the state is now declared as COVID-19 free state by Chief Minister.

=== May 2020 ===
- The government allowed the entry of modes of transportation like trains, buses and cars into Goa from 14 May, leading to a huge influx of people from other states. This caused a big spurt in COVID-19 cases in Goa, with 39 new cases in 6 days up to 19 May.
- State Health Minister Vishwajit Rane announced that all people above 18 years in Goa would be given ivermectin for prophylactic use for a period of five days. The Minister said this treatment would not prevent COVID-19 infection but it can help reduce its severity.

=== June 2020 ===
- Mangor Hill in Vasco da Gama, Goa is declared as Goa's first containment zone. As of Thursday 4 June the Covid positive cases touched 166, with 109 active cases including those at Mangor Hill.
- As of 19 June total Covid positive cases in Goa reached 705, with 596 active cases and 109 cures.
- On 22 June, Goa reported its first death due to Coronavirus on death of an 85-year-old man.

=== August 2020 ===
- On 13 August Goa had more than 10 thousand confirmed cases with almost 7 thousand recoveries and 91 death
- By the end of August, there were more than 20 thousand confirmed cases and 200 deaths.

== September–October 2020 ==
- The first COVID-19 peak was reported during this period.

== April–May 2021 ==
- A second peak was reported, which was seen as deadlier than the first, with a larger number of deaths than seen anytime earlier, on a daily basis.

== See also ==
- COVID-19 pandemic in India
- COVID-19 pandemic in Assam
- COVID-19 pandemic in Bihar
- COVID-19 pandemic in Delhi
- COVID-19 pandemic in Gujarat
- COVID-19 pandemic in Haryana
- COVID-19 pandemic in Karnataka
- COVID-19 pandemic in Kerala
- COVID-19 pandemic in Madhya Pradesh
- COVID-19 pandemic in Maharashtra
- COVID-19 pandemic in Punjab
- COVID-19 pandemic in Rajasthan
- COVID-19 pandemic in Tamil Nadu
- COVID-19 pandemic in Telangana
- COVID-19 pandemic in Uttar Pradesh
- COVID-19 pandemic in Uttarakhand
- COVID-19 pandemic in West Bengal

== Links ==
- Goa COVID-19 active cases map
