= COVID-19 pandemic in Uttar Pradesh =

Ongoing COVID-19 viral pandemic in Uttar Pradesh, India

- Disease: COVID-19
- Pathogen: SARS-CoV-2
- Location: Uttar Pradesh, India
- First outbreak: Wuhan, Hubei, China
- Index case: Ghaziabad
- Arrival date: 4 March 2020 (6 years, 2 months, 4 weeks and 1 day)
- Confirmed cases: 5,51,179 (4 December 2020)
- Active cases: 22,665
- Recovered: 5,20,637
- Deaths: 7,877
- Fatality rate: 1.4 %
- Territories: All districts

Government website
- MoHFW | Home; Coronavirus in India: Latest Map and Case Count

COVID-19 pandemic spread to Uttar Pradesh in March 2020. While the World Health Organization praised the UP government for its contact tracing efforts, there were several other issues in its management of the pandemic, including under reportage of cases by the government, vaccine shortages and dismal conditions of COVID-19 hospitals.

== Background ==
Uttar Pradesh is India's most populated state, with 240 million inhabitants. The 17th-century Taj Mahal in Uttar Pradesh is the most popular monument in India, attracting over 7 million visitors per year.

Uttar Pradesh has a large public as well as private healthcare infrastructure. Although an extensive network of public and private sector healthcare providers has been built, the available health infrastructure is inadequate to meet the demand for health services in the state.

== Timeline ==
=== March 2020 ===
- 5 March - A middle-aged man in Ghaziabad who had travel history to Iran tested positive.
- 9 March - A factory worker was tested positive after he came in contact with the coronavirus positive businessman from Agra. Earlier, five members from the businessman's family were tested positive.
- 12 March - A tourist guide in Noida, who came in contact with Italian guests was tested positive. Also a woman doctor from Canada tested positive in state capital Lucknow, taking the total cases in the state to ten.
- 13 March - An employee of a private firm in Noida tested positive who had travelled to Italy and Switzerland. Five patients were recovered.
- 15 March - State's twelfth case was reported in Lucknow.
- 17 March - Two people who returned from France tested positive in Noida
- 18 March - A man from Gautam Buddha Nagar district in Noida who had returned from Indonesia tested positive.
- 19 March - Two more people in state, one from Lucknow and the other from Lakhimpur Kheri district, tested positive. Later, an HCL employee in Noida who had returned from international travel tested positive.
- 20 March - Bollywood singer Kanika Kapoor who returned from London tested positive in Lucknow. Four more people tested positive in Lucknow - three related to a previously infected doctor and one with a travel history to Gulf.
- 21 March - Noida confirmed a case in Supertech CapeTown society.

=== April 2020 ===
- 1 April - 2 deaths reported in single day. First death in the state in Basti and other in Meerut.
- 3 April - 59 new cases reported in a single day out of which 54 are returned from Tablighi Jamaat in Delhi.
- 4 April - 70 new cases reported. 25 in Agra, 8 in Noida, 7 in Meerut, 6 in Maharajganj.
- 5 April - Third death in the state reported in Varanasi.
- 8 April - 4th death reported in state. First death in Agra.
- 11 April - 5th death in state. An ayurveda Doctor from Bulandshahr died in Delhi hospital. 13 People cured from the disease in a single day. Recovered people data raised to 45.
- 13 April - 75 new cases reported, 35 from Tablighi Jamaat in Delhi. 6th death in state and the first in Kanpur.
- 14 April - 102 new cases and 4 deaths in the state reported in a single day. Two each in Agra and Moradabad.
- 15 April - 67 new cases and two deaths in state. 4th in Agra. 1st in Lucknow.
- 16 April - 78 new cases and one death in state.
- 23 April - 61 new cases, 8 in Bahraich, 3 in Shravasti, 1 in Balrampur.
- 23 April - Uttar Pradesh minorities commission demands ban on Tablighi Jamaat in the state.
- 24 April - 111 new cases- 25 in Saharanpur, 29 in Kanpur, 9 in Varanasi, 1 in Ayodhya.

=== April 2021 ===
- 16 April - The UP government announced a partial Sunday lockdown in order to curb the second wave of infections plaguing the state.

== Response ==
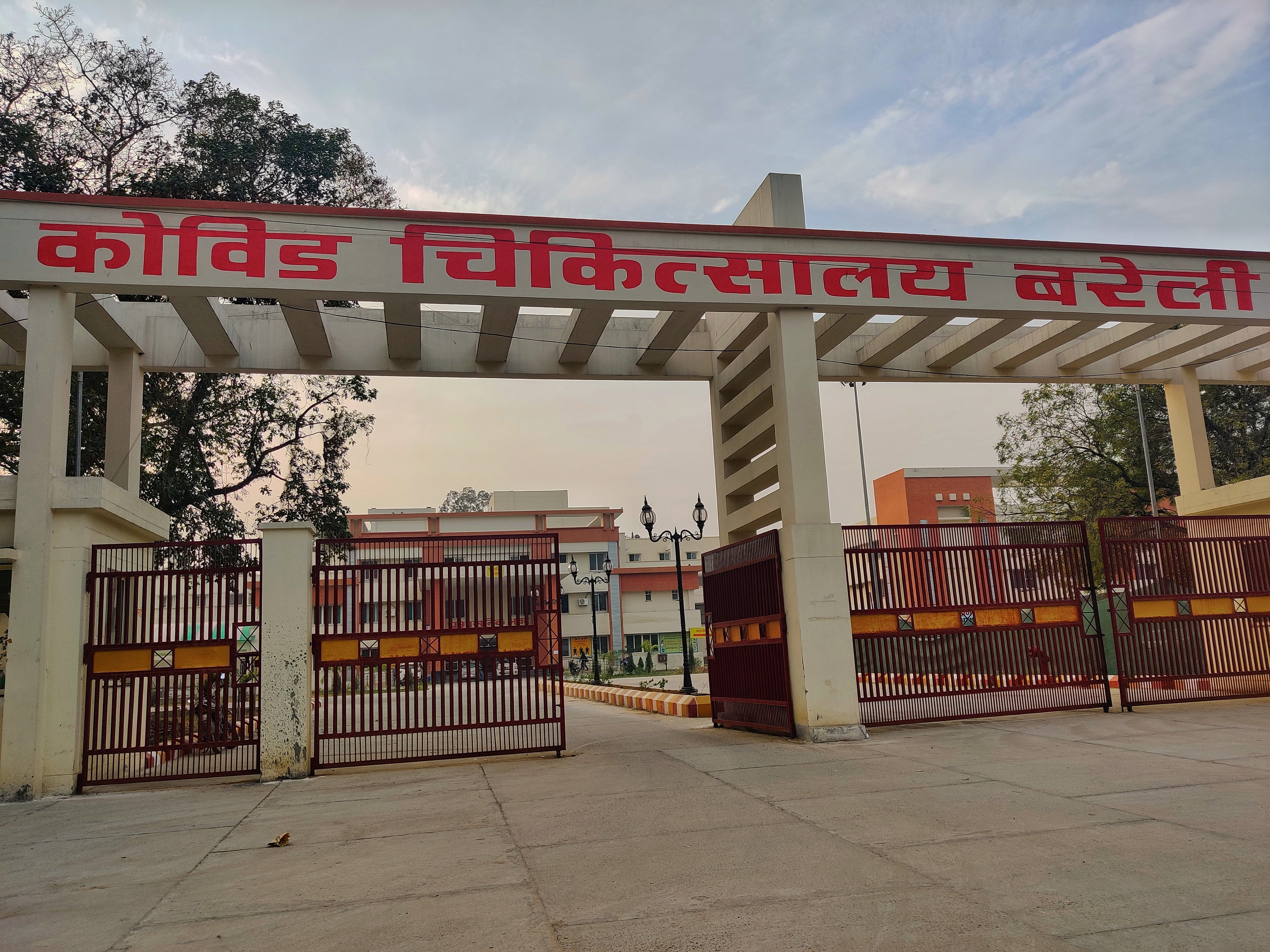
A COVID Hospital in Bareilly, UP

=== State Government Response ===
==== Public Health Strategy ====
30 April 2020 - UP Chief Minister Yogi Adityanath has also directed officials to add 52,000 additional beds in the COVID-19 hospitals in the state. Additional Chief Secretary (Home) Avanish Awasthi told reporters on Wednesday that while 17,000 beds would be added by the Health Department, 35,000 beds would be added by the Medical Educational Department. "The Health Department will increase 10,000 beds in level one, 5,000 beds in level two (with oxygen) and 2,000 beds in level three (with ventilator). The Medical Education Department will increase 20,000 beds in level one, 10,000 beds in level two and 5,000 beds in level three," he said.

==== Containment and Quarantine strategy ====
17 March - The Uttar Pradesh government extended the closure of all educational institutions, cinemas, shopping malls, swimming pool, gyms, multiplexes and tourists places in the state until April 2.

Slaughterhouses in state were ordered to be closed from 22 to 24 March.

22 March - Chief Minister Yogi Adityanath announced the lockdown of fifteen districts in state, from 22 to 25 March, including Noida, Ghaziabad, Agra, Aligarh, Allahabad, Kanpur, Varanasi, Bareilly, Lucknow, Saharanpur, Meerut, Lakhimpur, Azamgarh, Firozabad, Gorakhpur and others.

26 May - The Uttar Pradesh government has decided that arriving flight passengers will have to follow 14-day quarantine at their own homes. On sixth day of home quarantine, flyers can get themselves tested and end the quarantine. Business travellers with return ticket within 6 days will be exempt but will not be allowed to enter containment zones.

==== Public Awareness ====
17 March - District magistrates were instructed to spread awareness through posters and banners on the viral disease. Additionally, an appeal was made to religious leaders to avoid crowding in temples, mosques, gurudwaras and churches.

==== Unlock 1.0 ====
June 1 - The Government of UP released a new order that allowed the following to open up:

- Opening of all offices from June 1, 2020
- Markets opening on a rotation basis from 9 am to 9 pm
- Supermarkets, beauty parlours and salons were allowed to open
- No passes are required for inter-state travel except in Noida and Ghaziabad
- Taxis and rickshaws can take passengers as per the seating capacity in the vehicle
- Roadways buses are allowed to ply, but no passenger is allowed to stand in these buses
- Sweet shops have been allowed to open, but without the dining space
- Wedding halls could open, but they were not allowed to accommodate more than 30 people
- Two people (rider and pillion) are allowed on two-wheelers but with face masks

The lockdown will remain in place in the state until June 30, shopping malls, religious places and hotels and restaurants will open from June 8. The decision on reopening schools and colleges will be taken in July.

== Migrant workers crisis ==
=== Transportation to home state ===
On 28 March, the Uttar Pradesh government arranged for 1,000 buses to ferry migrant labourers who were stranded on the border districts owing to a countrywide lockdown without consulting Delhi State Government that resulted in huge chaos on border. Officials of the Transport Department, bus drivers and conductors were contacted on Friday night to help the people who were stranded in Noida, Ghaziabad, Bulandshahr and Aligarh, among other places.

On 25 April, a day after the Yogi Adityanath government announced that it would bring back UP labourers stranded in other states, the first batch of 2,224 workers, who had completed quarantine period of two weeks in Haryana, were brought back to the state in the first phase of the exercise on Saturday.

On 5 May the Additional Chief Secretary (Home) Awanish K Awasthi informed that over 65000 workers have been brought back from different states. He said that anyone from another state who is stranded in UP can register on 'Jansunwai' portal to seek help. "People from UP stranded in other states can get themselves registered" On 7 May the Additional Chief Secretary informed that around 51,371 had reached UP so far.

"Today 43 trains have arrived in the state carrying migrant laborers. With the help of these trains, 51,371 workers arrived from different states. Today, 13 more trains will come before 12 pm, about 15,500-15,600 laborers will come. We have given permission for about 43 trains," These 43 trains arrived at stations such as Agra, Kanpur, Lucknow, Jaunpur, Gorakhpur, Pratapgarh, Rae Bareli, Kannauj, Banda, Azamgarh, Barabanki, Sitapur and Unnao. There were 51,371 workers and labourers on these 43 trains. On 9 May the Additional Chief Secretary informed that so far, 97 trains carrying migrant workers have entered into Uttar Pradesh from other states and 17 more trains will arrive by evening today. Government has allowed plying of 98 more trains which will arrive tomorrow and day after tomorrow.

An Air India Express flight also brought back 182 Indians to Lucknow from Sharjah, UAE. By 11 May, 184 trains had brought 2.26 lakh migrant workers from other states. 55 more trains will arrive in Uttar Pradesh today. Around 1 lakh migrant workers also returned by their own conveyance. On 12 May the Additional Chief Secretary informed that so far, 233 trains had brought 281,408 migrant workers to the state. Today 13 trains have arrived until now and more will come in the coming days. All the passengers will be screened and medical checkups will be conducted. On 14 May it was reported that so far, 318 'Shramik Special' trains have brought back 384,260 people to Uttar Pradesh. 67 more special trains will arrive in the state today. Permission has been granted for plying of 174 more such trains.

=== Relief and essentials ===
On 21 March, CM Yogi Adityanath announced that the Uttar Pradesh government has decided to give ₹1,000 (US$14) to all daily wage laborers affected due to coronavirus in the state. On 1 May, Uttar Pradesh CM Yogi Adityanath directed that any worker or labourer of UP who is stranded in another state due to lockdown, can use his/her ration card number & avail its benefits there. Those who do not have a ration card, then under State Disaster Response Fund (SDRF), food packets are being provided.

Uttar Pradesh CM Yogi Adityanath transferred Rs 225.39 Crores to Mahatma Gandhi National Rural Employment Guarantee Act (MGNREGA) beneficiaries through direct bank transfer. The state government has instructed to provide Rs 1000 to migrant workers who have been asked to remain in home quarantine after their return from other states. On 25 May the CM directed that the migration commission that is being constituted will be named Kaamgar, Shramik (Seva Ayojan and Rojgaar) Kalyan Ayog, to employ migrant workers/labourers. Under this commission, social security will be guaranteed to workers/labourers by providing employment to them.

=== Administrative changes ===
- 30 March - CM Yogi Adityanath dismissed District Magistrate of Gautam Buddh Nagar district BN Singh and appointed Suhas L. Y. as New DM.

=== Transportation for non-migrants stranded in other states ===
- 18 April - 9,000 Stranded Students in Kota Leave for Their Homes in UP after Thorough Screening. About 250 buses from Uttar Pradesh on Friday reached Kota in Rajasthan to pick up about 9,000 stranded students and drop them to their native districts. Each bus accommodated a maximum of 30 students.
- 27 April - Chief Minister Yogi Adityanath ordered for making necessary arrangements to send students preparing for competitive exams in Prayagraj to their homes in 300 UPSRTC buses. The students will be sent in these buses in two rounds. In the first round, students will sent to their homes in Sonbhadra, Mirzapur, Chandauli, Varanasi, Jaunpur, Pratapgarh, Kaushambi, Fatehpur & Chitrakoot. Students from other districts will be sent in the second round.
- 24 May - Additional Chief Secretary (Home) Awanish K Awasthi informed that Around 23 lakh people have been brought back to the state of Uttar Pradesh from different states, amid Coronavirus Lockdown.

== Legal Actions ==
The Uttar Pradesh government has said that Perpetrators be charged under the stringent National Security Act, Epidemic Act and the Disaster Management Act for resorting to violence and preventing the health and police officials from doing their duty. The state government has decided to use the UP Recovery of Public and Private Property Ordinance, 2020 against those indulging in violence.

Following several attacks on doctors and other health officials, and subsequent demands from ICMR and Resident Doctors Association, the Union Government brought an ordinance to amend The Epidemic Diseases Act. Under it, the guilty can be sent to jail for three months to five years, with a fine of Rs.50,000 to Rs.2 lakh. However, if there is grievous injury then the guilty could be sent to jail for six months to seven years and fined Rs. 1 lakh to Rs. 5 lakh. More than 8000 people have been fined in the state to date for violation of social distancing norms and for not wearing masks.

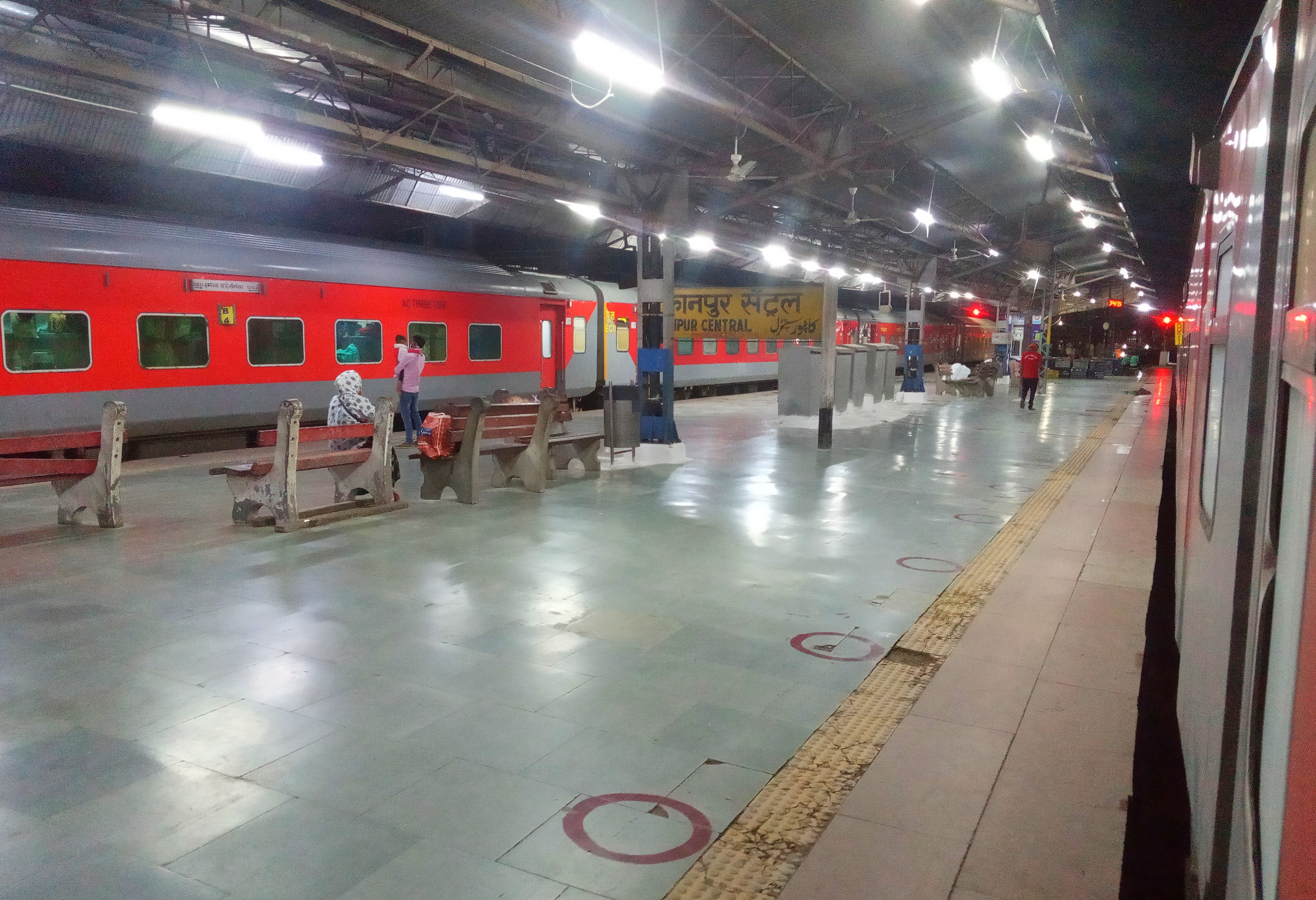
Unlock phase 1- Kanpur railway station on 4 June 2020

== Impact ==
=== Environment ===
Due to lower pollution levels in state during the imposition of lockdown, Himalayan range became visible from Saharanpur.

=== Education ===
Since the closure of educational institutions in lockdown, alternate education strategies like online classes have been adopted in urban areas. While lakhs of children living in villages are deprived of the alternative.

=== Social ===
==== Violence against medical staff and police ====
Medical staff and police were attacked by villagers while trying to enforce lockdown in Meerut and Muzaffarnagar. In Moradabad, a mob tried to stop a medical team from taking a coronavirus-infected man into isolation by pelting stones at the ambulance while damaging a police vehicle. Five of the seventeen arrested stone pelters tested positive in COVID-19 tests. Locals in Aligarh also pelted stones at police as they tried to enforce lockdown, while in Bahraich people attached police team for refusing to offer namaz in mosque. Healthcare workers and police were attacked and stone pelted in Kanpur when nine members of a family who had been in close contact with a coronavirus positive patient were being taken to a quarantine facility.

=== Hospital care crisis ===
International news sources reported many stories of deaths and families damaged by the second wave of COVID-19 in Uttar Pradesh, as infections increased during 2021. Retired judge Ramesh Chandra told BBC that "for years, I have despaired at the poor medical facilities in the state - it's where my ancestral village is located and I know the struggles of finding a doctor or an ambulance even in normal times.".

== Testing statistics ==
Total samples tested	7,17,38,740
Sample Tested per million population	3,59,031
COVID-19 Positive	17,09,234
Negative	1,94,09,214
Recovered	16,86,128
As of 29 August 2021

=== Testing Costs ===
On 19 June 2020, the Uttar Pradesh government announced that it has fixed the maximum price for COVID-19 tests at ₹2,500. "The price has been fixed in two categories. The first one relates to the corona testing at private or corporate hospitals. In this case, the charges will not be more than ₹2,000 per person. The same applies to a situation where these hospitals tie up with private labs. The second category is that of private pathology or diagnostic labs where the rate cannot exceed ₹2,500," a government spokesperson said.

=== Testing Facilities ===
Currently there are 121 government laboratories conducting COVID-19 Testing. Government has also permitted testing in 44 privately operated labs.

== See also ==
- COVID-19 pandemic in India
- COVID-19 pandemic in Assam
- COVID-19 pandemic in Bihar
- COVID-19 pandemic in Delhi
- COVID-19 pandemic in Goa
- COVID-19 pandemic in Gujarat
- COVID-19 pandemic in Haryana
- COVID-19 pandemic in Karnataka
- COVID-19 pandemic in Kerala
- COVID-19 pandemic in Madhya Pradesh
- COVID-19 pandemic in Maharashtra
- COVID-19 pandemic in Punjab
- COVID-19 pandemic in Rajasthan
- COVID-19 pandemic in Tamil Nadu
- COVID-19 pandemic in Telangana
- COVID-19 pandemic in Uttarakhand
- COVID-19 pandemic in West Bengal
