= Test Yourself Goa =

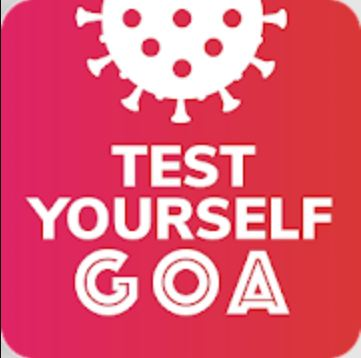
Logo of application

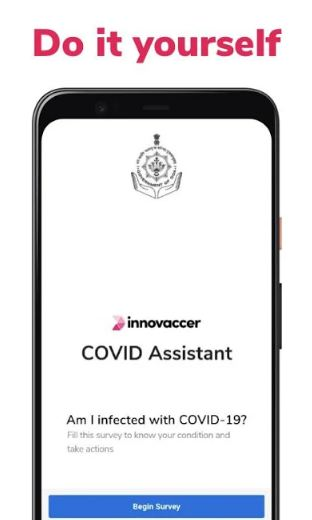
Application cover page

Test Yourself Goa is a self-assessment tool by the Indian state of Goa for helping people identify whether they have been infected with COVID-19 without visiting a doctor or hospital. Goa has become the first Indian state to launch a self-assessment tool for COVID-19. The government of Goa partnered with Innovaccer, a US healthcare analytics company, to develop the tool.

== See also ==
- COVID-19 pandemic in Goa
