= Toronto Business Development Centre =

- Founded: 1990
- Location(s): City of Toronto, Ontario, Canada
- Website: www.tbdc.com

Toronto Business Development Centre (TBDC) is a non-profit organization in City of Toronto, Ontario, Canada. Its mandate is to nurture the growth of new and emerging businesses. As a business incubator, TBDC assists entrepreneurs in navigating the challenging road of starting and developing a new business. It offers entrepreneurial training programs, business seminars and business networking opportunities. TBDC is a member of the Canadian Association of Business Incubation (CABI).

== History ==
The centre is an initiative of the city of Toronto and the Ontario Ministry of Economic Development of Trade in 1990.
