= COVID-19 pandemic in Haryana =

Ongoing COVID-19 viral pandemic in Haryana, India

COVID-19 Pandemic in Haryana
- Disease: COVID-19
- Pathogen: SARS-CoV-2
- Location: Haryana, India
- First outbreak: Wuhan, China
- Index case: Gurugram
- Arrival date: 4 March 2020 (6 years, 5 months, 1 week and 4 days)
- Confirmed cases: ▲2,64,955
- Active cases: ▼2,510
- Recovered: ▲2,59,495
- Deaths: ▲2,950
- Territories: 22 out of 22 districts

Government website
- www.mohfw.gov.in

The first case of COVID-19 in the Indian state of Haryana was reported on 4 March 2020. The Ministry of Health and Family Welfare has confirmed a total of 2,64,955 positive cases as of 10 January 2021 out of which 2,510 are still active and 2,950 deaths so far. The recovery rate in Haryana is 97.9%.

== Testing and countermeasures ==
=== Testing facilities ===
Six (8) labs, one each at PGIMS, Rohtak, BPS Khanpur Kalan, Sonipat, ESIC Hospital, Faridabad, Kalpana Chawla Medical College, Karnal, ICAR-National Research Centre on Equines, Hisar, PGIMER Chandigarh, CSIR Mohali, Civil Hospital, Panchkula are already functional for testing of COVID-19. Five private labs at Gurugram (Modern Diagnostics and Research Lab, SRL, CORE Diagnostics, Pathkind Diagnostics Pvt. Ltd., Dr. Lal Pathlabs) approved by ICMR for COVID-19 testing.

=== Hospital facilities ===
6 government/ aided medical colleges namely PGIMS in Rohtak, BPSGMC in Khanpur Kalan (Sonepat), SHKMGMC in Nalhar, Nuh, KCGMC, Karnal, MAMC, Agroha and 27 hospitals will have dedicated exclusive wards/blocks for COVID-19 patients only. ESIC Medical College, Faridabad is under process for COVID-19 hospital.

All government/ government aided/ private medical colleges in the state have been asked to reserve at least 25% of the beds.

Isolation wards and quarantine facilities are established as given below:

34,876 isolation beds identified in 601 government and private facilities.

21,188 persons quarantine facility identified in 6133 rooms/dormitories.

== Timeline ==
=== July 2020 ===
- As of 10 July, the total figure in Haryana had reached 19934. Of these, 13290 males and 6642 females and two transgender people have been found infected. In the new case, 111 in Gurugram, 50 in Sonipat, 24 in Rohtak, 7 in Bhiwani, 66 in Rewari, 24 in Karnal, 27 in Ambala, 16 in Jhajjar, 15 in Palwal, 68 in Mahendragarh, 66 in Hisar, Panipat has 38, 18 in Noah, 1 in Kurukshetra, 10 in Sirsa, 8 in Jind, 5 in Fatehabad, 5 in Panchkula, 1 in Yamunanagar and 5 in Kaithal.
- As of 13 July, the total COVID-19 Case-21929, Total active COVID-19 patients-4984, Total positive COVID-19 patients- recovered/discharged to date-16637
- As of 16 July, total number of cases in Haryana was 24002, including 5495 active cases, 18185 recoveries and 322 deaths.
- As of 18 July, the total number of cases was 25547, including 5885 active cases, 19318 cures and 344 deaths.
- As of 23 July, the total number of cases was 28975, including 6348 active cases, 22249 recoveries and 378 deaths.
- As of 27 July, the total number of cases was 32127, including 6684 active cases, 25046 recoveries and 397 fatalities.
- As of 29 July, the total number of cases was 33631, including 6798 active cases, 26420 recoveries and 413 Deaths.

=== August 2020 ===
- As of 3 August, the total figure in Haryana had reached 39234. This includes 6193 active cases, 32583 recoveries and 458 Deaths.
- As of 6 August, the total number of COVID-19 cases in the state was 39303. This includes 6205 active cases, 32640 recoveries and 458 Deaths.
- As of 9 August, the total number of COVID-19 cases in the state was 41635. This includes 6371 active cases, 34781 cures and 483 Deaths.
- As of 14 August, the total number of COVID-19 cases was 45614. This includes 6748 active cases, 38348 cures and 518 deaths.
- As of 18 August, the total number of COVID-19 cases in the state was 48936. This includes 7081 active cases, 41298 cures and 557 fatalities.
- As of 23 August, the total number of COVID-19 cases in the state was 54386. This includes 8961 active cases, 44822 cures and 603 Deaths.
- As of 25 August, the total number of COVID-19 cases was 56608, including 9489 active cases, 46496 cures and 623 Deaths.

=== September 2020 ===
- As of 1 September, the total number of COVID cases in Haryana had reached 66426. This includes 11885 active cases, 53835 recoveries and 706 Deaths.
- As of 6 September, the total number of COVID cases was 76549. This includes 15692 active cases, 60051 cures and 806 deaths.
- As of 10 September, the total number of COVID cases was 85944. This includes 18332 active cases, 66705 cures and 907 deaths.
- As of 16 September, the total number of COVID cases was 101316, including 21334 active cases, 78937 recoveries and 1045 deaths. Total number of cases in Haryana passed the grim milestone of 100000 persons on 16 September.
- As of 22 September, the total number of COVID cases was 114870. This includes 19888 active cases, 93776 cures and 1206 fatalities.
- As of 28 September, the total number of COVID cases was 125412, including 15670 active cases, 108411 cures and 1331 deaths.

=== October 2020 ===
- As of 2 October, the total number of COVID cases in Haryana had reached 131388. This includes 13247 active cases, 113716 recoveries and 1425 Deaths.
- As of 5 October, the total number of COVID cases was 134909. This includes 11822 active cases, 121596 recoveries and 1491 Deaths.
- As of 14 October, the total number of COVID cases was 145507 including 10187 active cases, 133706 cures and 1614 Deaths.
- As of 27 October, the total number of COVID cases was 160705 including 10452 active cases, 148530 cures and 1750 fatalities.

=== November 2020 ===
- As of 4 November, the total number of COVID cases in Haryana had reached 174082. This includes 14110 active cases, 158136 recoveries and 1836 Deaths.
- As of 15 November, the total number was 199874. This includes 19557 active cases, 178298 recoveries and 2019 Deaths.
- As of 23 November, the total number was 219963. This includes 20412 active cases, 197335 cures and 2216 Deaths.

=== December 2020 ===
- As of 2 December, the total number of COVID cases in Haryana had reached 237604. This includes 16673 active cases, 218443 recoveries and 2488 Deaths.
- As of 7 December, the total number of COVID cases was 245288. This includes 12126 active cases, 230551 recoveries and 2611 Deaths.
- As of 20 December, the total number of COVID cases was 257644. This includes 5888 active cases, 248935 recoveries and 2821 Deaths.
- As of 28 December, the total number of COVID cases was 261258, including 4040 active cases, 254336 recoveries and 2882 Deaths.
- As of 31 December, the total number of COVID cases was 262325, including 3567 active cases, 255853 recoveries and 2905 Deaths.

=== January 2021 ===
- As of 3 January, the total number of COVID cases in Haryana had reached 263068, including 2890 active cases, 257261 recoveries and 291 deaths.
- As of 11 January, the total number of COVID cases was 265199. This includes 2547 active cases, 259696 recoveries and 2956 deaths.
- As of 19 January, the total number of COVID cases was 266581, including 1837 active cases, 261751 recoveries and 2993 fatalities.
- As of 24 January, the total number of COVID cases was 267203, including 1511 active cases, 262682 cures and 3010 fatalities.

=== February 2021 ===
- As of 1 February, the total number of COVID cases in Haryana had reached 267989, including 1081 active cases, 263886 recoveries and 3022 deaths.
- As of 13 February, the total number of COVID cases had reached 268969, including 845 active cases, 265085 recoveries and 3039 deaths.
- As of 20 February, the total number of COVID cases had reached 269609, including 816 active cases, 265751 recoveries and 3042 deaths.

=== March 2021 ===
- As of 6 March, the total number of COVID cases in Haryana was 272215, including 1898 active cases, 267261 recoveries and 3056 deaths.
- As of 14 March, the total number of COVID cases had reached 275137, including 3095 active cases, 268968 cures and 3074 deaths.
- As of 29 March, the total number of COVID cases had reached 288714, including 9312 active cases, 276259 cures and 3143 deaths.

=== April 2021 ===
- As of 1 April, the total number of COVID cases in Haryana was 292409, including 10362 active cases, 278883 recoveries and 3164 deaths.
- As of 4 April, the total number of COVID cases was 298133, including 12574 active cases, 282368 recoveries and 3191 deaths.
- As of 8 April, the total number of cases was 307510, including 17129 active cases, 287151 cures and 3230 fatalities.
- As of 13 April, the total number of COVID cases is 324544, including 24207 active cases, 297039 recoveries and 3298 fatalities.

=== May 2021 ===
- As of 5 May, the total number of COVID cases in Haryana was 558795, including 113425 active cases, 440590 recoveries and 4960 deaths.
- As of 17 May, the total number of COVID cases was 701915, including 83161 active cases, 611955 recoveries and 6799 deaths.
- As of 25 May, the total number of COVID cases was 744602, including 34088 active cases, 702779 cures and 7735 deaths.

7 MAY 2021

=== June 2021 ===
- As of 17 June, the total number of COVID cases in Haryana was 766838, including 3227 active cases, 754464 recoveries and 9147 deaths.
- As of 21 June, the total number of COVID cases was 767580, including 2337 active cases, 755968 recoveries and 9275 deaths.
- As of 25 June, the total number of COVID cases was 768142, including 1927 active cases, 756864 cures and 9351 deaths.

=== July 2021 ===
- As of 13 July, the total number of COVID cases in Haryana was 769343, including 872 active cases, 758908 recoveries and 9563 fatalities.

=== August 2021 ===
- As of 28 August, the total number of COVID cases in Haryana was 770445, including 657 active cases, 760115 recoveries and 9673 fatalities.

=== September 2021 ===
- As of 23 September, the total number of COVID cases in Haryana was 770770, including 332 active cases, 760629 recoveries and 9809 deaths.
- As of 28 September, the total number of COVID cases was 770847, including 277 active cases, 760696 recoveries and 9874 deaths.

=== Oct to Dec 2021 ===
- As of 6 October, the total number of COVID cases in Haryana was 770949, including 273 active cases, 760801 recoveries and 9875 deaths.
- As of 8 October, the total number of COVID cases was 770975, including 279 active cases, 760821 cures and 9875 deaths.
- As of 23 October, the total number of COVID cases was 771141, including 115 active cases, 760977 recoveries and 10049 fatalities.
- As of 1 November, the total number of COVID cases was 771252, including 135 active cases, 761068 cures and 10049 fatalities.
- As of 4 December, the total number of COVID cases was 771780, including 182 active cases, 761544 cures and 10054 fatalities.

=== Jan to Mar 2022 ===
- As of 9 January, the total number of COVID cases in Haryana was 788985, including 13960 active cases, 764953 recoveries and 10072 deaths.
- As of 28 January, the total number of COVID cases was 937606, including 32011 active cases, 895339 recoveries and 10256 deaths.
- As of 11 February, the total number of COVID cases was 971511, including 7039 active cases, 954000 recoveries and 10472 fatal cases.
- As of 21 February, the total number of COVID cases was 978884, including 2633 active cases, 965220 cures and 10531 deaths.
- As of 25 February, the total number of COVID cases was 980759, including 2310 active cases, 967898 cures and 10551 deaths.
- As of 19 March, the total number of COVID cases was 984457, including 571 active cases, 973291 cures and 10595 deaths.

=== Apr to Jun 2022 ===
- As of 13 April, the total number of COVID cases in Haryana was 986259, including 580 active cases, 975062 recoveries and 10617 deaths.
- As of 26 April, the total number of COVID cases was 989762, including 2673 active cases, 977293 cures and 10618 fatal cases.
- As of 2 May, the total number of COVID cases was 992987, including 2496 active cases, 979872 recoveries and 10619 deaths.
- As of 11 May, the total number of COVID cases was 997759, including 2153 active cases, 984985 cures and 10621 deaths.
- As of 28 May, the total number of COVID cases was 1002025, including 1096 active cases, 990308 cures and 10621 fatalities.
- As of 11 June, the total number of COVID cases was 1005359, including 1548 active cases, 993190 recoveries and 10621 deaths.
- As of 22 June, the total number of COVID cases was 1011421, including 2984 active cases, 997915 cures and 10622 deaths.

=== July to September 2022 ===
- As of 16 July, the total number of COVID cases in Haryana was 1022034, including 2033 active cases, 1009369 recoveries and 10632 deaths.
- As of 30 August, the total number of COVID cases was 1051297, including 2300 active cases, 1038318 recoveries and 10679 deaths.
- As of 10 September, the total number of COVID cases was 1053666, including 666 active cases, 1042307 cures and 10693 deaths.
- As of 18 September, the total number of COVID cases was 1054254, including 439 active cases, 1043118 cures and 10697 fatal cases.
- As of 24 September, the total number of COVID cases was 1054683, including 337 active cases, 1043643 cures and 10703 deaths.

== COVID-19 vaccines with approval for emergency or conditional usage ==
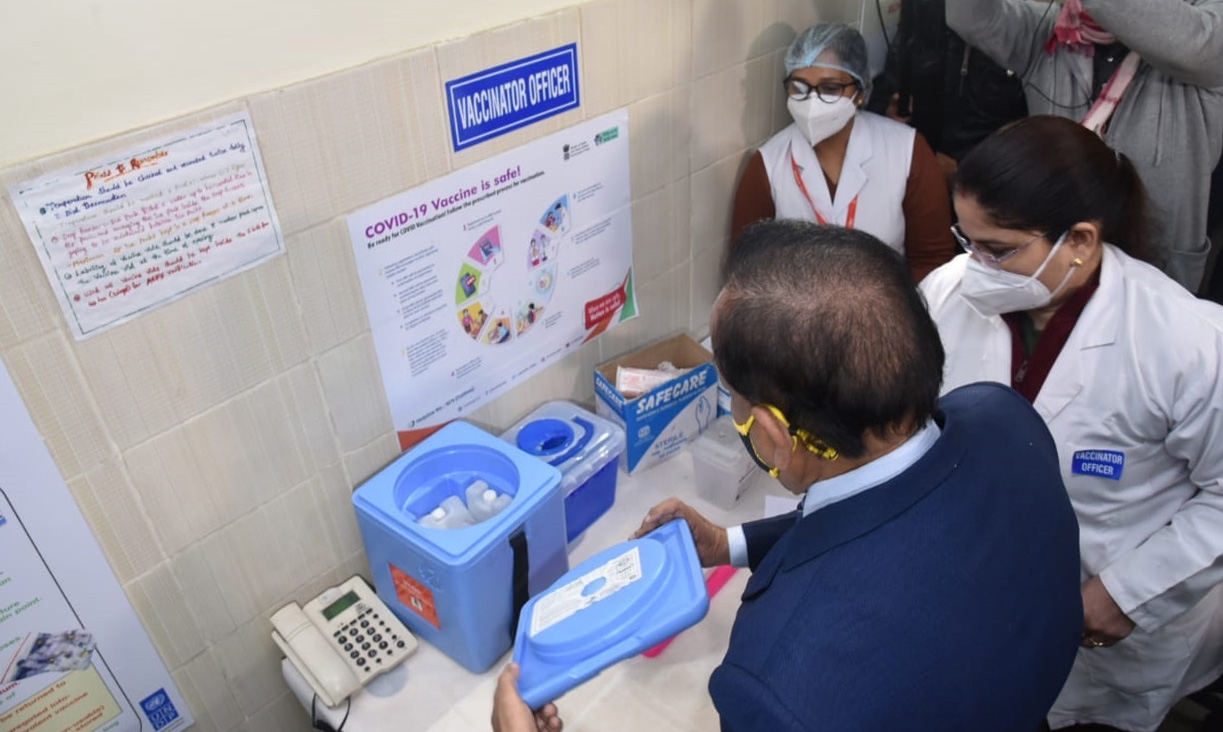
Union Minister for Health & Family Welfare, Dr. Harsh Vardhan visiting the GTB Hospital, Shahdara to review the preparedness of dry run of COVID-19 vaccine, in Delhi on January 2, 2021.

=== Covishield ===
On 1 January 2021, the Drug Controller General of India, approved the emergency or conditional use of AstraZeneca's COVID-19 vaccine AZD1222 (marketed as Covishield). Covishield is developed by the University of Oxford and its spin-out company, Vaccitech. It is a viral vector vaccine based on replication-deficient adenovirus that causes cold in chimpanzees. It can be stored, transported and handled at normal refrigerated conditions (28 degrees Celsius/ 36-46 degrees Fahrenheit). It has a shelf-life of at least six months.

On 12 January 2021 first batches of Covishield vaccine was despatched from the Serum Institute of India.

=== Covaxin ===
On 2 January 2021, BBV152 (marketed as Covaxin), first indigenous vaccine, developed by Bharat Biotech in association with the Indian Council of Medical Research and National Institute of Virology received approval from the Drug Controller General of India for its emergency or conditional usage.

On 14 January 2021 first batches of Covaxin vaccine was despatched from the Bharat Biotech, albeit it was still in the third phase of testing.

=== Others ===
On 19 May 2021, Dr Reddy's Labs received Emergency Use Authorisation for anti-COVID drug 2-DG. On 21 February 2022, Drugs Controller General of India granted approval to Biological E's COVID-19 vaccine Corbevax, that can be used for children between 12 and 18 years of age.

On 21 October 2021, India completed administering of one billion Covid vaccines in the country.

On 8 January 2022, India crossed 1.5 billion Covid vaccines milestone in the country.

On 19 February 2022, India crossed 1.75 billion Covid vaccines milestone in the country.

== See also ==
- COVID-19 pandemic in India
- COVID-19 pandemic in Rohtak
- Timeline of the COVID-19 pandemic in India
- COVID-19 lockdown in India
