= COVID-19 pandemic in Punjab, India =

Ongoing COVID-19 viral pandemic in Punjab, India

COVID-19 pandemic in Punjab
- Disease: COVID-19
- Pathogen: SARS-CoV-2
- Location: Punjab, India
- First outbreak: Wuhan, China
- Index case: Amritsar
- Arrival date: 9 March 2020 (6 years, 6 months, 2 weeks and 2 days)
- Confirmed cases: 6,02,401 (as of 31 October 2021)
- Recovered: 5,85,591 (as of 31 October 2021)
- Deaths: 16,559 (as of 31 October 2021)
- Territories: All 22 Districts

Government website
- Official website

The COVID-19 pandemic was confirmed to have spread to the Indian state Punjab on 9 March 2020, when an Indian man returning from Italy was tested positive. As of 31 October 2021, the Ministry of Health and Family Welfare has confirmed a total of 6,02,401 cases, including 16,559 deaths and 5,85,591 recoveries in Punjab. The economy of Punjab has been severely affected by the COVID-19 pandemic.

== Graphs ==
=== Total confirmed cases, active cases, recoveries and deaths ===
Total confirmed cases Active Cases Recoveries Deceased

=== Daily Progression Charts ===
Daily new confirmed cases

New cases per day

Daily new Recoveries

New Recoveries per day

Deceased count per day

Deceased per day

=== Vaccine doses administered across the state ===
Total number of vaccination doses inoculated

Total number of vaccine first doses Total number of vaccine 2nd doses

== Testing ==
=== Testing rates ===
By 26 July, Punjab ramped up its testing rates and is targeting 12,000 tests per day. August 2020, Punjab has increased the testing capacity more than 20,000/day with the help of new 4 labs.

Summary of test results via DIPR, Punjab
Average growth rate	0.6% (Note: (((previous day data - seven day before data) / seven day before data) * 100) / 7)
Samples tested	53,13,932 (5.3m)
Positive	1,94,753
Positive %	3.66%
Confirmed per million	~ 6,522 (Note: (confirmed cases/state population)*1 million)
Tests per million people (Note: Population based on 2019 estimates from National Health Mission)	≈ 1,77,968
As of 2021-03-13

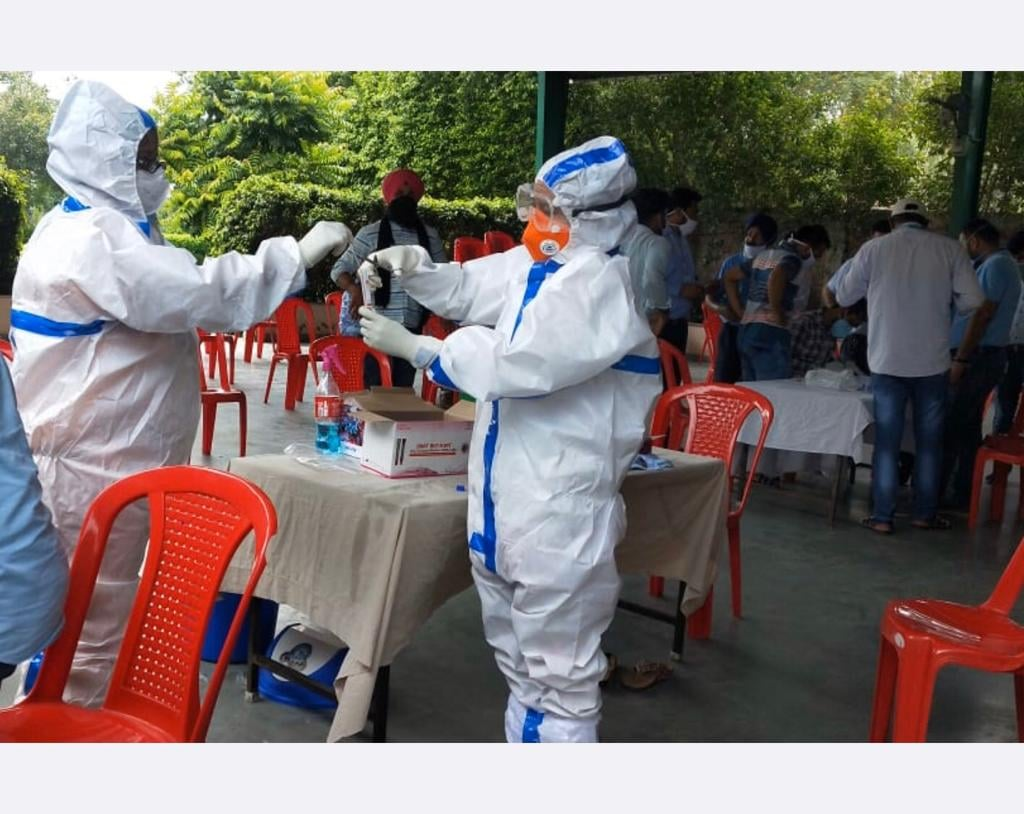
Medical team conducting COVID-19 sample collection in Barnala District

== Vaccine and trails ==
=== COVID-19 vaccination rollout in Punjab ===
Phase 1a Health Minister Balbir Singh Sidhu announced around 1.60 lakh health workers in Punjab will receive a COVID-19 vaccine in the first phase, after that frontline worker and then people over the age of 50 or with co-morbid conditions. Vaccination inoculation of healthcare workers has been started in Punjab on 16-01-2021 at 59 designated sites across all the state.

Phase 1b Vaccination of the frontline worker including police, local bodies, disaster management, rural development and panchayats and revenue departments will be starting from 1 February 2021.

Phase 2 On 1 March 2021, Punjab will start its phase II of vaccination for senior citizens and below the 60s people with co-morbid conditions.

Phase 3 On 1 April 2021, all people above the age of 45 are now eligible in this phase.

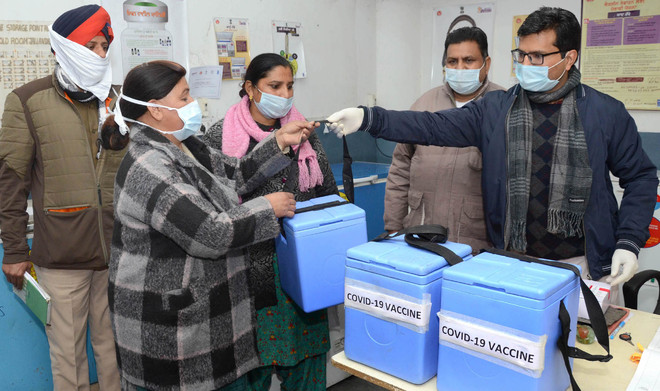
Officials of Jalandhar Civil Hospital hand over the vaccine to the staff of community health centre

Order	Priority group	Number eligible (estimated)	Number of inoculated (1st dose)	Number of inoculated (2nd dose)
1	Healthcare professionals, both government and private	160,000	152,185	67,169
2	Frontline worker including police, paramilitary forces, sanitation workers & disaster management volunteers	300,000	264,796	50,946
3	People above 60 years and those aged below 50 with co-morbid conditions	300,000	726,981	8,540
4	all those above 45 years of age		726,981	8,540
Total (1st Dose)				1,201,737
Total (2nd Dose)				126,499
As of 2021-April-5

COVID-19 vaccinations in Punjab, September 25, 2026
Vaccine	Progress	Doses ordered for India	Doses allocated for Punjab	Approval	Deployment
Oxford-AstraZeneca	Phase III clinical trials	500 million	1,780,000	01 January 2021	16 January 2021
Covaxin	Phase III clinical trials	10 million	137,000	01 January 2021(restricted)	Yes
Please note that this data is interim, so, the information is subject to change as per new official updates from health officials

==== COVID-19 vaccination centres in Punjab ====
Region	City Hospital hubs	Regional vaccination centres	Totals
Amritsar	District Civil Hospital, Government Medical College and Sri Guru Ram Das University of Health Sciences (3)	-	3
Barnala	Civil Hospital, Barnala(1)	Civil Hospital Bhadaur, Dhanaula, Tapa & Mehal Kalan (4)	5
Bathinda	Delhi Heart Institute & Multispeciality Hospital, City Hospital (2)	CHC Goniana (1)	3
Faridkot	-	-	-
FG Sahib	-	-	-
Fazilka	-	-	-
Ferozepur	-	-	-
Gurdaspur	-	-	-
Hoshiarpur	-	-	-
Jalandhar	-	-	-
Kapurthala	-	-	-
Ludhiana	D.M.C & City Hospital LDH (2)	Civil Hospital in Payal, Jagraon, Khanna, Raikot and Macchiwara (5)	7
Mansa	District Hospital Mansa (1)	SDH Budhlada (1)	2
Moga	-	-	-
Pathankot	-	-	-
Patiala	-	-	-
Rupnagar	-	-	-
S.A.S Nagar	-	-	-
Sangrur	-	-	-
S.B.S Nagar	-	-	-
Sri Muktsar Sahib	-	-	-
Tarn Taran	-	-	-
Grand Total	NA	NA	110
Please note that this data is interim, so, the information is subject to change; As per the directions of the central government, the state has to identify five locations in each district and total 110

=== Vaccines approved in India ===
- AstraZeneca vaccine/Covishield : India has approved the AstraZeneca vaccine developed by Oxford University and manufactured by Serum Institute of India. Covishield (Indian name of Oxford vaccine) got the green light from DCGI(Drugs Controller General of India).
- Covaxin : Bharat Biotech Ltd developed COVAXIN vaccine is under phase 3 trials including Punjab's three Government Medical Colleges with the help of ICMR from 15 October 2020. Two portions of the inactivated virus infusion given to the members (0 and 28 days) as a component of the Phase-3 human preliminaries. Covaxin developed by Bharat Biotech got approval for emergency use in India by DCGI (Drugs Controller General of India).

=== Vaccines around the world ===
- Pfizer : The USA based Pfizer and BioNTech announced on 9-Nov-2020 that their BNT162b2 vaccine is 90% effective according to their first interim efficacy analysis. Final study of Pfizer vaccine's trials concludes that the efficacy of this vaccine is up to 95% if two doses given to a person with a gap of 28 days between doses. 31-Dec-2020, WHO has approved the Pfizer vaccine for emergency use and has been added to te UN organization's Emergency Use Listing (EUL). The countries have approved the emergency use of Pfizer vaccine : United Kingdom, Bahrain, Canada, United States, Saudi Arabia and Mexico.
- Moderna : 16 November 2020, Moderna, Inc. proclaimed that first interim results of mRNA-1273 vaccine trials showed 94.5% efficacy. This study conducted on almost 30,000 participants in the U.S. 18 December 2020, U.S. approved the Moderna for emergency for persons of age 18 or over.
- AstraZeneca : 27 November 2020, Professor Andrew Pollard announced that the study of AZD1222 vaccine's trials developed by Oxford University and AstraZeneca showed it is 90% effective when AZD1222 was given as a half dose, followed by a full dose at least 28 days apart. On 30 December 2020 U.K has approved the emergency approval of the AstraZeneca vaccine developed by the Oxford University. Argentina, India, El Salvador, Mexico and Dominican Republic has also approved the emergency use of this vaccine.

== Government response ==
Summary of restrictions
Emergency declared	20 March 2020
Indoor gatherings banned	Over 100
Outdoor gatherings banned	Over 200
State border status	Open
Face mask	Compulsory
Night curfew	Partial
Schools	Open in restricted manner
Universities and colleges	Open in restricted manner
Gym & Spa	Open(restricted)
Cinema & entertainment park	Open(50% capacity only)

=== Lockdown and containment ===
==== Lockdown ====
On 16 March, the Punjab government issue an advisory to close gyms, restaurants, etc. Three days later the government also shuts down public transport in state from midnight of 20 March and also prohibited gathering of more than 20 persons.

On 22 March, Punjab government declared complete Lockdown in state until 31 March 2020 except Emergency services. On 23 March, the Punjab Government imposed full curfew across Punjab without any relaxation, become first State to impose full curfew.

On 10 April, the Punjab government extended curfew in state until 1 May. On 29 April, the Punjab government announced for extension of curfew for another 14 days. However, it announced that there would be relaxation for 4 hours every morning. On 16 May, The Punjab Government extended the lockdown to 31 May, taking down curfew and divided the Punjab into containment and non-containment zones.

As of 21 June, the Chief Minister has ordered strict lockdowns on weekends and public holidays.

13 July 2020, CM has announced new guidelines regarding gatherings in the state, a complete bar on public gatherings and only 30 persons now attend any social gathering instead of 50 from today. Section 144 has enforced in all districts and mask is mandatory in office as well.

31 July 2020, According to the Unlock-3.0 night curfew (11 PM to 5 AM) still in enforce across the state. All theatres, bars, entertainment parks, auditoriums, sports centres, cultural events and pools will also be going to remain closed until further notice, but Gyms and Yoga centres are now permitted to open with all COVID safety norms from 5 August 2020.

==== Containment strategy ====
As of 23 June, Punjab has implemented a stringent containment strategy. The containment zones are delineated as a street or even a society.

=== Screening and quarantine ===
As of 23 June, door-to-door searches are being carried out by Asha workers to identify persons with COVID-19. The entire population in containment areas is being screened, and those who test positive are being shifted to isolation centres. Moreover, an App called Ghar Ghar Nigran is being used to survey those above the age of 30. The police has been assisting the administration in contact tracing of COVID-19 patients.

On 23 July 2020, PM Captain Amarinder Singh revised the charges of fine for breaching the quarantine or home isolation, ₹ 5000 instead of ₹ 2000. Restaurant's owner would be penalised with ₹5000 if they failed to meet the social-distancing and other COVID safety norms. ₹10,000 fine would be charged if someone broke the public gathering regulation and social distancing norms. ₹500 fine for not wearing mask in public place and there are also fine for bus operators, taxi and auto-rickshaws for breaching COVID safety rules.

=== Relief efforts ===
On 23 March, the Punjab government-sanctioned 20 crore rupees for free food, medicines to poor from CM Relief Fund. Ministers, Officers and MLAs including Indian National Congress and Shiromani Akali Dal, decided to donate one month salary in Punjab Chief Minister Relief Fund, Aam Aadmi Party MLA Aman Arora also donated 1 month salary. Shiromani Gurdwara Parbandhak Committee also offered helping hand amid the coronavirus pandemic to treat corona positive patients at its Hospitals.

On 24 March, the Punjab Chief Minister also set up COVID Relief Fund to be utilised for the welfare of the people in distress due to Coronavirus.

In April, the Punjab Rice Exports Association and FICCI Flo, along with other individuals and NGOs distributed ration in collaboration with the district administration. The Madad Charitable Foundation has been providing 1,500 packets of meals daily to the Police Lines staff. Voice of Amritsar has been providing relief to the most vulnerable populations.

The administration is also voluntarily working with Radha Soami Satsang Beas, Chief Khalsa Diwan, Lions Club, Rotary Club, Youth Clubs of various villages are reaching out to needy families. The district control room is also being used as a call centre with distress calls being received for food supplies.

=== Mission Fateh ===
Punjab Chief Minister Captain Amarinder Singh on Tuesday launched 'Mission Fateh as part of state battle against COVID-19. 'Mission Fateh represents the determination of the individuals of Punjab to end the spread of the Novel Coronavirus through control, collaboration and sympathy.'

=== Treatment rates for private hospitals ===
Punjab Government has announced on 16 July, they are capping the price of COVID-19 treatment at the private hospital, and the price of treatment, fixed for Private Hospitals and Medical Colleges by Dr K.K. Talwar Committee, include isolation beds, treatment in ICU and hospitalisation charges, per day of admission.

For Moderate Sickness requiring Isolation Beds, including strong consideration and oxygen, the price per day of affirmation is fixed at Rs 10,000 for all Private Medical Colleges/NABH Private Hospitals with showing program from NBE. NABH certify Hospitals (Including Private Medical Colleges without PG/DNB Course) can charge Rs. 9000 and Rs. 8000 for Non-NABH authorise Hospitals.

The charges over these classifications of clinics for Severe Sickness (ICU without the requirement for ventilator) have been topped, individually, at Rs. 15000, Rs. 14000 and Rs 13000, while for Very Severe or Critical patients, these are fixed at Rs 18000, Rs, 16500 and Rs 15000 separately.

=== Establishment of plasma bank ===
As on 21 July 2020, CM Capt Amrinder Singh has approved the permission to establish a plasma bank as inventory to treat the severely ill patient by plasma therapy and it is established at Rajindra Hospital, Patiala. Two machines have been set up in the hospital as part of Mission Fateh.

Do's & Don'ts of COVID-19 released by Ministry of Health and Family Welfare

=== Withdrawal of police ===
According to the Chief Minister's directives, Punjab Police has withdrawn 6355 personnel from non-core duties and these personals are changed into COVID reserve forces across all the districts. These are initiated to enforce the COVID safety norms and laws properly in the state (24/07/2020).

=== Major relaxations to industry ===
July-24, 2020: To uplift the investment by industry, Punjab's CM has announced the major announcements for the industry sector including statutory clearances' period can be extended without any inspection.

=== COVID Care Centres for under-60 mild/asymptomatic patients ===
Punjab Government has enlarged its COVID care limit with respect to admitting patient under-60 of mild/asymptomatic. To match these needs government has established new Level-1 COVID Care Centres (CCCs) in 10 districts across the state. The capacity of these centres is 7520 beds. These centres are running in educational institutes to the limit of 7000 beds which can be upgraded to 28000 beds if there is a spike in cases further.

== Impact ==
=== Education ===
On 13 March 2020, The Punjab governments declared holidays in all schools and colleges until 31 March. On 19 March, Punjab School Education Board postponed all Board Exams of 10th and 12th classes. Punjab Government has preferred to cancel the pending examinations of different classes which were prior declared to be led after 15 July by Punjab School Education Board (PSEB) and PSEB will announce the marks on the basis of credit carry formula.

On 25 July 2020, CM Punjab confirmed that no government/public school will not be going to charge any sort of admission, re-admission or tuition fee in session 2020-21 from students on the basis of coronavirus crisis. These announcements have been made in #AskCaptain session on 25 July 2020.

According to the Unlock 3.0 guidelines, all educational institute including public and private will be closed until 31 August. Perhaps, online education can be continued. All examinations including universities, board or entrance are allowed with physical distancing policy.

=== Transportation ===
On 19 March Punjab government also shuts down public transport in the state from midnight of 20 March and prohibited gathering of more than 20 persons. On 20 May, The Punjab Government resumed intrastate bus services in Punjab. The restrictions on bus capacity were lifted on 27 June 2020. Masks are mandatory for all passengers.

=== Labour laws ===
Punjab has amended its Factories Act in April increasing work time to 12 hours a day instead of 8, and 72 hours a week instead of 48.

=== Guidelines for film, video shooting ===
Punjab state government has announced some new guidelines for film, video shooting in the state in the unlock-2 period on 23-July-2020. CM of Punjab stated that permission seekers firstly need to submit an application to the Deputy Commissioner. DC office after consulting with police authority could issue a letter of permission and a copy shall be endorsed to police and other consultant authorities.

Under these guidelines, while shooting no more than 50 people should be that time and must be completed in less time as much as possible. All the COVID safety norms will be applicable during shooting like screening of all members before commencement, facilities of soap or sanitiser and social distancing except who is in the front of the camera and this rule likewise applicable in the terms of wearing masks. No public crowding allowed near the shooting place, so private security personnel Must be arranged.

== Travel restrictions ==
=== Travelling interstate ===
Travel within Punjab

Travel in Punjab is largely unrestricted. People are free to visit and travel within the state under the guidelines issued by the government.

==== Border restrictions ====
Registration

If you are planning travel to Punjab, aim to complete the Cross Border Travel Registration on the government's official website or the COVA App and must be home quarantine for 14 days, but, students would like to come to the state for SSB, or any other examination is not obliged to go into quarantine. People who are visiting the state for only 72 hours or less, no need to do quarantine, but they need to submit self-declaration regarding their purpose of visit at the state border.

=== Arriving from overseas ===
The Ministry of Health and Family Welfare (MoHFW) made it compulsory to do quarantine at their own expense for all travellers including Indian citizens returning from abroad to India. Few exceptions will be given — death in the family, pregnancy, serious illness, human distress, and parents accompanied by children below the age of 10, and approved travellers will be asked to self-isolate at home for 14 days. The download of Aarogya Setu app is compulsory for all. Advisories regarding the quarantine of returnees from outside the country asymptomatic contacts in the hotel/private facilities in the wake of COVID-19 pandemic are issued by the Department of Health & Family Welfare, Government of Punjab. Travelers stranded overseas are being advised by Indian Consulates and the Ministry of External Affairs, Government of India.

== See also ==
- Timeline of the COVID-19 pandemic in India
- COVID-19 pandemic in India
- Corona
- COVID-19 vaccination in India
- COVID-19 pandemic in Delhi
