= COVID-19 pandemic in Telangana =

Ongoing COVID-19 viral pandemic in Telangana, India

- Disease: COVID-19
- Pathogen: SARS-CoV-2
- Location: Telangana, India
- First outbreak: Wuhan, Hubei, China
- Index case: Hyderabad
- Arrival date: 2 March 2020 (6 years, 8 months, 2 weeks and 5 days)
- Confirmed cases: 247,284 (5 November 2020)
- Active cases: 19,272
- Recovered: 226,646 (5 November 2020)
- Deaths: 1,366 (5 November 2020)
- Fatality rate: 0.55%

Government website
- covid19.telangana.gov.in

The first case of the COVID-19 pandemic in India was reported on 30 January 2020, originating from China. Slowly, the pandemic spread to various states and union territories including the state of Telangana. The first case was recorded in this region on 2 March from a man who had travel history with the UAE.

== Timeline ==
=== June 2020 ===
- As on 7 June, total number of cases in Telangana was 3650, including 1771 active cases 137 deaths and 1742 recoveries.
- As on 22 June, total number of cases in Telangana included 4452 active cases 217 deaths and 4005 cures.
- On 23 July, the total number of cases in Telangana crossed the grim milestone of 10000 cases.
- As on 26 June, total number of cases was 11364, including 6446 active cases 230 deaths and 4688 cures.

=== July 2020 ===
- As on 6 July, total number of cases in Telangana was 25733, including 10646 active cases 306 deaths and 14781 recoveries.
- As on 15 July, total number of cases was 39342, including 12957 active cases 386 deaths and 25999 recoveries.
- As on 17 July, total number of cases was 42496, including 13388 active cases 403 fatalities and 28705 recoveries.
- On 23 July, the total number of cases in Telangana crossed the grim milestone of 50000.
- As on 27 July, total number of cases was 54059, including 12264 active cases 463 deaths and 41332 recoveries.
- As on 29 July, total number of cases was 60717, including 15640 active cases 505 deaths and 44572 recoveries.
- As on 30 July, total number of cases was 62703, including 16796 active cases 519 deaths and 45388 recoveries.
- As on 31 July, total number of cases was 64786, including 17754 active cases 530 deaths and 46502 recoveries.

=== Aug 2020 ===
Date	Total Cases	Active Cases	Total Deaths	Total Recoveries
1 August 2020	66,677	18,547	540	47,590
2 August 2020	67,660	18,500	551	48,609
3 August 2020	68,946	18,708	563	49,675
4 August 2020	70,958	19,568	576	50,814
5 August 2020	73,050	20,358	589	52,103
6 August 2020	75,257	21,417	601	53,239
7 August 2020	77,513	22,568	615	54,330
8 August 2020	79,495	22,869	627	55,999
9 August 2020	80,751	22,528	637	57,586
10 August 2020	82,647	22,628	645	59,374
11 August 2020	84,544	22,596	654	61,294
12 August 2020	86,475	22,736	665	63,074
13 August 2020	88,396	23,438	674	64,284
14 August 2020	90,259	23,379	684	66,196
15 August 2020	91,361	22,542	693	68,126
16 August 2020	92,255	21,420	703	70,132
17 August 2020	93,937	21,024	711	72,202
18 August 2020	95,700	20,990	719	73,991
19 August 2020	97,424	21,509	729	75,186
20 August 2020	99,391	21,687	737	76,967
21 August 2020	1,01,865	22,386	744	78,735
22 August 2020				
23 August 2020				
24 August 2020	1,06,091	22,919	744	82,411
25 August 2020				
26 August 2020				
26 August 2020				
28 August 2020	1,17,425	28,951	799	87,675
29 August 2020				
30 August 2020				
31 August 2020	1,24,963	31,299	827	92,837

=== September 2020 ===
- As on 3 September, total number of cases in Telangana was 133406, including 32537 active cases 856 deaths and 100013 recoveries.
- As on 8 September, total number of cases was 145163, including 31670 active cases, 112587 recoveries and 906 deaths.
- As on 11 September, total number of cases was 152602, including 32195 active cases, 119467 cures and 940 deaths.
- As on 17 September, total number of cases was 165003, including 30443 active cases, 133555 recoveries and 1005 deaths.
- As on 24 September, total number of cases is 179246, including 30037 active cases, 148139 cures and 1070 deaths.
- As on 29 September, total number of cases is 189283, including 29477 active cases, 158690 recoveries and 1116 deaths.

=== October 2020 ===
- As on 4 October, total number of cases in Telangana was 199276, including 27901 active cases, 1163 deaths and 170212 recoveries.
- On 5 October, total number of cases in Telangana crossed grim milestone of 200000 mark.
- As on 6 October, total number of cases in the state was 202594, including 26644 active cases, 174769 recoveries and 1181 fatalities.
- As on 14 October, total number of cases was 216238, including 23728 active cases, 191269 cures and 1241 fatalities.
- As on 21 October, total number of cases was 226124, including 20449 active cases, 204388 recoveries and 1287 deaths.
- As on 27 October, total number of cases was 232671, including 17890 active cases, 213466 recoveries and 1315 fatalities.

=== November 2020 ===
- As on 8 November, total number of cases in Telangana was 250331, including 19890 active cases, 1377 deaths and 229064 recoveries.
- As on 24 November, total number of cases in Telangana is 265049, including 11047 active cases, 252565 recoveries and 1437 deaths.

=== December 2020 ===
- As on 1 December, total number of cases in Telangana was 270318, including 9627 active cases, 259230 recoveries and 1461 deaths.
- As on 6 December, total number of cases in Telangana was 273341, including 8125 active cases, 263744 cures and 1472 deaths.
- As on 11 December, total number of cases was 276516, including 7604 active cases, 267427 cures and 1485 deaths.
- As on 21 December, total number of cases is 281730, including 6590 active cases, 273625 cures and 1515 deaths.
- As on 28 December, total number of cases is 285068, including 6231 active cases, 277304 cures and 1533 fatalities.
- As on 31 December, total number of cases is 286815, including 5815 active cases, 279456 recoveries and 1544 deaths.

=== January 2021 ===
- As on 5 January, total number of cases in Telangana was 287993, including 5039 active cases, 281400 recoveries and 1554 deaths.
- As on 11 January, total number of cases was 290008, including 4518 active cases, 283924 recoveries and 1566 fatalities.
- As on 18 January, total number of cases was 291872, including 4049 active cases, 286244 cures and 1579 fatalities.
- As on 22 January, total number of cases was 292835, including 3781 active cases, 287468 cures and 1568 deaths.
- As on 26 January, total number of cases is 293590, including 3072 active cases, 288926 cures and 1592 deaths.

=== February 2021 ===
- As on 1 February, total number of cases in Telangana was 294587, including 2092 active cases, 290894 recoveries and 1601 deaths.
- As on 13 February, total number of cases was 296567, including 1741 active cases, 293210 recoveries and 1616 fatalities.
- As on 20 February, total number of cases was 297435, including 1715 active cases, 294097 recoveries and 1623 deaths.

=== March 2021 ===
- As on 7 March, total number of cases in Telangana was 299900, including 1886 active cases, 296373 recoveries and 1641 deaths.
- As on 15 March, total number of cases in Telangana was 301318, including 1983 active cases, 297681 cures and 1654 deaths.
- As on 29 March, total number of cases in Telangana was 306742, including 4583 active cases, 300469 cures and 1690 deaths.

=== April 2021 ===
- As on 5 April, total number of cases in Telangana was 313237, including 8746 active cases, 302768 recoveries and 1723 deaths.
- As on 9 April, total number of cases was 321182, including 15472 active cases, 303964 recoveries and 1746 deaths.
- As on 21 April, total number of cases in Telangana was 367901, including 46488 active cases, 319537 cures and 1876 deaths.

=== May 2021 ===
- As on 7 May, total number of cases in Telangana was 481640, including 73851 active cases, 405164 recoveries and 2625 deaths.
- As on 18 May, total number of cases was 532784, including 49341 active cases, 480458 recoveries and 2985 deaths.
- As on 26 May, total number of cases was 563903, including 38632 active cases, 522082 cures and 3189 deaths.

=== June 2021 ===
- As on 17 June, total number of cases in Telangana was 609817, including 19521 active cases, 586362 recoveries and 3534 deaths.
- As on 25 June, total number of cases was 618837, including 15524 active cases, 599695 recoveries and 3618 deaths.

=== July 2021 ===
- As on 19 July, total number of cases in Telangana is 637373, including 9836 active cases, 623773 recoveries and 3764 deaths.

=== August 2021 ===
- As on 27 August, total number of cases in Telangana was 656794, including 6166 active cases, 646761 recoveries and 3867 deaths.

=== September 2021 ===
- As on 23 September, total number of cases in Telangana was 664164, including 4946 active cases, 655310 recoveries and 3908 deaths.
- As on 26 September, total number of cases was 664898, including 4701 active cases, 656285 cures and 3912 deaths.

=== Oct to Dec 2021 ===
- As on 6 October, total number of cases in Telangana was 667158, including 4406 active cases, 658827 recoveries and 3925 deaths.
- As on 9 October, total number of cases was 667725, including 4288 active cases, 659508 cures and 3929 fatalities.
- As on 23 October, total number of cases was 670139, including 3984 active cases, 662209 cures and 3946 deaths.
- As on 2 November, total number of cases was 671463, including 4009 active cases, 663498 recoveries and 3956 deaths.
- As on 14 December, total number of cases was 678478, including 3837 active cases, 670633 recoveries and 4008 fatalities.
- As on 29 December, total number of cases was 681072, including 3459 active cases, 673589 recoveries and 4024 deaths.

=== Jan to Mar 2022 ===
- As on 6 January, total number of cases in Telangana was 685543, including 6168 active cases, 675341 recoveries and 4034 deaths.
- As on 16 January, total number of cases was 707162, including 22017 active cases, 681091 cures and 4054 deaths.
- As on 26 January, total number of cases was 747155, including 38023 active cases, 705054 cures and 4078 fatal cases.
- As on 5 February, total number of cases was 776313, including 29226 active cases, 742988 recoveries and 4099 deaths.
- As on 12 February, total number of cases was 783019, including 13674 active cases, 765239 recoveries and 4106 deaths.
- As on 21 February, total number of cases was 787063, including 4787 active cases, 778167 recoveries and 4109 fatal cases.
- As on 19 February, total number of cases was 790689, including 740 active cases, 785840 cures and 4111 deaths.

=== Apr to Jun 2022 ===
- As on 11 April, total number of cases in Telangana was 791522, including 213 active cases, 787198recoveries and 4111 deaths.
- As on 30 April, total number of cases was 792044, including 335 active cases, 787598 recoveries and 4111 deaths.
- As on 12 May, total number of cases was 792435, including 391 active cases, 787933 cures and 4111 deaths.
- As on 17 May, total number of cases was 792627, including 374 active cases, 788142 recoveries and 4111 fatal cases.
- As on 28 May, total number of cases was 793090, including 425 active cases, 788554 recoveries and 4111 deaths.
- As on 10 June, total number of cases was 794184, including 907 active cases, 789166 cures and 4111 deaths.
- As on 23 June, total number of cases was 797138, including 2680 active cases, 790347 cures and 4111 fatalities. There hasn't been and Covid related death in the state is almost 3 months now.

=== July to September 2022 ===
- As on 31 August, total number of cases in Telegana was 834478, including 1545 active cases, 828822 cures and 4111 fatalities.
- As on 5 September, total number of cases was 834965, including 1189 active cases, 829665 recoveries and 4111 deaths.
- As on 17 September, total number of cases was 836621, including 768 active cases, 831742 cures and 4111 deaths.
- As on 25 September, total number of cases was 837326, including 705 active cases, 832510 cures and 4111 fatal cases.
- As on 26 October, total number of cases was 839836, including 507 active cases, 835218 recoveries and 4111 fatal cases.

== Statistics ==
High Positivity Rate:

Positivity Rate can be loosely defined as the number of patients turning positive for coronavirus upon testing per every 100 suspects. This rate can be calculated either on a daily basis or on a cumulative basis on the total number of tests conducted. In this parameter, Telangana state fares as one of the worst performing state in India with very high positivity rate.

As per the health bulletin issued by Government of Telangana on June 30, Telangana state claims to have conducted a cumulative number of 88563 tests of which, 16339 tested positive. The overall positivity rate comes to 18.44% (applicable for up to 30 June). It needs to be noted that for a long time, the Telangana state did not publicly disclose the daily number of tests it was conducting daily that drew the ire of the High Court. Hence, the cumulative number of tests cannot be corroborated.

== Testing ==
As per Telangana government media bulletin dated 31-Jul-2020, number of testing facilities in the state are as below.

Type	Government	Private
RT-PCR/CBNAAT/TRUENAT	16	23
Rapid Antigen Testing Centers	320	

Status of Tests in the state is as below.

Date	No of Samples tested	Cumulative	Reports Awaited
23 July 2020		3,22,326	
24 July 2020	15,445	3,37,771	
25 July 2020	15,654	3,53,425	
26 July 2020	9,817	3,63,242	
27 July 2020	15,839	3,79,081	809
28 July 2020	18,858	3,97,939	788
30 July 2020	21,380	4,37,582	1,216
31 July 2020	21,011	4,58,593	883
1 August 2020	19,202	4,77,795	1,656
2 August 2020	9,443	4,87,238	1,414
3 August 2020	13,787	5,01,025	919
4 August 2020	21,118	5,22,143	1,167
5 August 2020	21,346	5,43,489	1,550
6 August 2020	23,495	5,66,984	1,539
7 August 2020	23,322	5,90,306	1,596
8 August 2020	22,925	6,13,231	1,509
9 August 2020	11,609	6,24,840	1,700
10 August 2020	18,035	6,42,875	959
11 August 2020	22,972	6,65,847	1,221
12 August 2020	23,303	6,89,150	706
13 August 2020	22,046	7,11,196	1151
14 August 2020	21,239	7,32,435	664

Summary of test results
Samples tested	4,531,153
Positive	247,284
Positive %	5.46%
Tests per million people (Note: Population based on 2019 estimates from National Health Mission)	228,684
As of 5 November 2020

== Response ==
As on 27 July, more than 60% of COVID-19 victims of the state had been buried in a single graveyard named Faqeer Mullah Kabristan on the outskirts of Hyderabad.

== COVID-19 Vaccines with Approval for Emergency or Conditional Usage ==
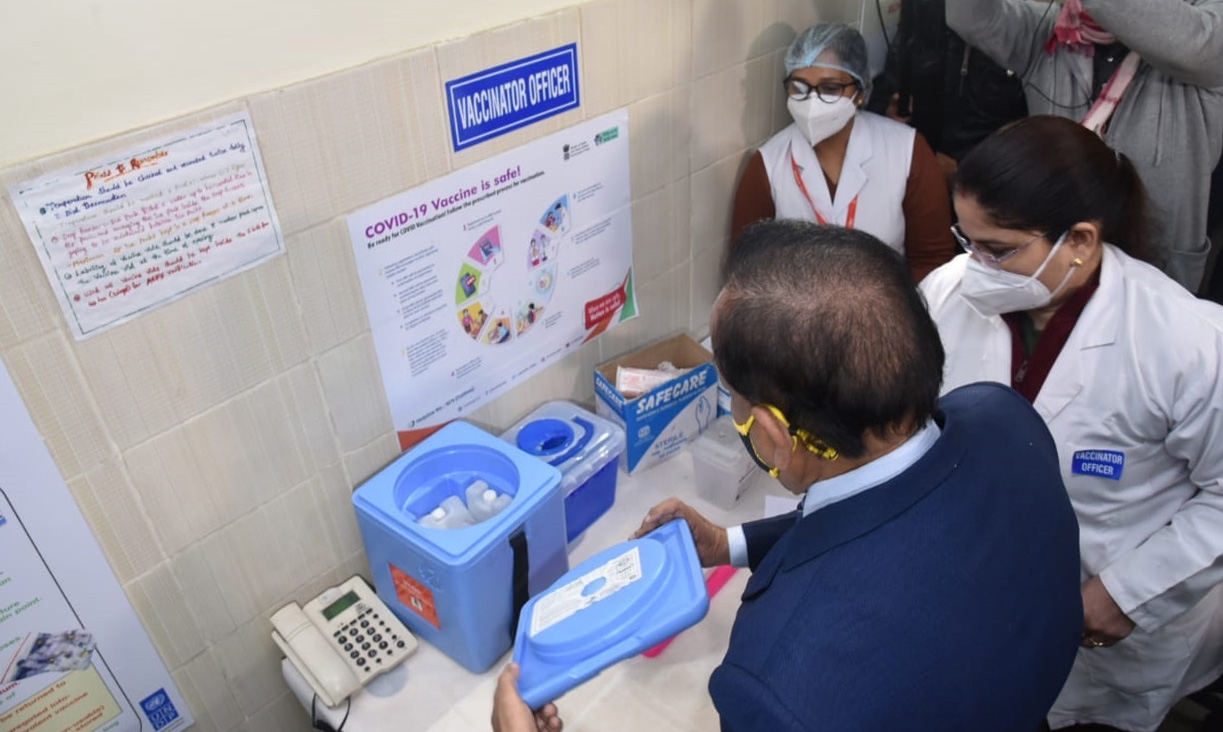
Union Minister for Health & Family Welfare, Dr. Harsh Vardhan visiting the GTB Hospital, Shahdara to review the preparedness of Dry Run of COVID-19 vaccine, in Delhi on January 02, 2021.

=== Covishield ===
On 1 January 2021, the Drug Controller General of India, approved the emergency or conditional use of AstraZeneca's COVID-19 vaccine AZD1222 (marketed as Covishield). Covishield is developed by the University of Oxford and its spin-out company, Vaccitech. It's a viral vector vaccine based on replication-deficient Adenovirus that causes cold in Chimpanzees. It can be stored, transported and handled at normal refrigerated conditions (two-eight degrees Celsius/ 36-46 degrees Fahrenheit). It has a shelf-life of at least six months.

On 12 January 2021 first batches of Covishield vaccine was despatched from the Serum Institute of India.

=== Covaxin ===
On 2 January 2021, BBV152 (marketed as Covaxin), first indigenous vaccine, developed by Bharat Biotech in association with the Indian Council of Medical Research and National Institute of Virology received approval from the Drug Controller General of India for its emergency or conditional usage.

On 14 January 2021 first batches of Covaxin vaccine was despatched from the Bharat Biotech, albeit it was still in the third phase of testing.

=== Others ===
On 19 May 2021, Dr Reddy's Labs received Emergency Use Authorisation for anti-COVID drug 2-DG. On 21 February 2022, Drugs Controller General of India granted approval to Biological E's COVID-19 vaccine Corbevax, that can be used for children between 12 and 18 years of age.

On 21 October 2021, India completed administering of one billion Covid vaccines in the country.

On 8 January 2022, India crossed 1.5 billion Covid vaccines milestone in the country.

On 19 February 2022, India crossed 1.75 billion Covid vaccines milestone in the country.

== Vaccination ==
On 12 January 2021, a consignment of 3.64 lakh doses of Oxford-AstraZeneca's Covishield vaccine arrived in Hyderabad from Pune. Along with 3.64 lakh doses of Covishield, manufactured by Serum Institute of India, the Telangana Health department has received 20,000 doses of Bharat Biotech's Covaxin on 13 January 2021. S Kistamma, a female sanitation worker at the Gandhi Hospital in Secunderabad, became the first person in Telangana to receive the COVID-19 vaccination on the morning of 16 January 2020.

== See also ==
- COVID-19 pandemic in India
- COVID-19 pandemic
