= COVID-19 pandemic in Uttarakhand =

Ongoing COVID-19 viral pandemic in Uttarakhand, India

- Disease: COVID-19
- Pathogen: SARS-CoV-2
- Location: Uttarakhand, India
- First outbreak: Wuhan, Hubei, China
- Index case: Dehradun
- Arrival date: 15 March 2020 (6 years, 7 months, 3 weeks and 6 days)
- Confirmed cases: 2,402 (22 June 2020)
- Active cases: 860
- Recovered: 1,521 (22 June 2020)
- Deaths: 21 (12 June 2020)
- Fatality rate: 0.87%

Government website
- health.uk.gov.in

The first case of the COVID-19 pandemic in India was reported on 30 January 2020. Slowly, the pandemic spread to various states and union territories including the state of Uttarakhand. The first case was recorded in this region on 15 March.

As on 24 May, the total number of confirmed cases in Uttarakhand was 244, including 188 active cases, 55 recoveries, and one death which. As of 5 June, this number has risen to 1,153 cases, of which 842 are active, and there have been 297 recoveries and 10 deaths. Newly sworn Uttarakhand Chief Minister Tirath Singh Rawat has been criticised for rightly placing faith before the pandemic and accused of double standards on restrictions of gatherings of different religions.

== Timeline of Events ==
=== March 2020 ===
15 March: The first case was reported in March, in Dehradun when an Indian Forest Service official returned from Spain.

19 March: 2 more IFS trainees tested positive.

=== May 2020 ===
- As of 7 May, total number of cases in Uttarakhand is 72, including 46 active cases 1 death and 25 recoveries.

=== June 2020 ===
- On 2 June 2020, total number of cases in Uttarakhand crossed the 1000 mark.
- As of 7 June, total number of cases in Uttarakhand was 1350, including 809 active cases 13 deaths and 528 recoveries.
- As of 11 June, total number of cases in Uttarakhand was 1692, including 771 active cases 19 deaths and 895 cures.
- As of 29 June, total number of cases in Uttarakhand was 2809, including 662 active cases 39 deaths and 2108 recoveries.

=== July 2020 ===
- As of 9 July, total number of cases in Uttarakhand was 3258, including 534 active cases 46 deaths and 2650 cures.
- As of 15 July, total number of cases in Uttarakhand was 3785, including 754 active cases 50 deaths and 2948 recoveries.
- As of 18 July, total number of cases is 4241, including 1108 active cases 52 deaths and 3081 recoveries.
- As of 29 July, total number of cases is 6866, including 2983 active cases 72 deaths and 3811 recoveries.

=== August 2020 ===
- As on 3 August, total number of cases in Uttarakhand was 7762, including 3134 active cases, 90 deaths and 4538 cures.
- On 11 August 2020, total number of cases in Uttarakhand crossed 10000 mark.
- As on 12 August, total number of cases in Uttarakhand was 10887. This includes 4020 active cases, 140 deaths and 6687 cures.
- As on 19 August, total number of cases was 12961, including 4024 active cases, 164 deaths and 8724 cures.
- As on 23 August, total number of cases was 15124. This includes 4389 active cases, 200 deaths and 10480 cures.
- As on 25 August, total number of cases in the state was 16014. This includes 4545 active cases, 213 deaths and 11201 recoveries.

=== September 2020 ===
- As on 1 September, total number of cases in Uttarakhand was 20398, including 6042 active cases, 280 deaths and 14012 cures.
- As on 7 September, total number of cases was 25436, including 7965 active cases, 17046 recoveries and 348 deaths.
- As on 12 September, total number of cases was 30336, including 9781 active cases, 20031 recoveries and 402 deaths.
- As on 16 September, total number of cases was 35947, including 11068 active cases, 24277 cures and 447 deaths.
- As on 22 September, total number of cases is 42651, including 11831 active cases, 30107 recoveries and 512 fatalities.
- As on 28 September, total number of cases was 47502, including 10066 active cases, 36646 recoveries and 580 deaths.

=== October 2020 ===
- On 3 October 2020, total number of cases in Uttarakhand crossed 50000 mark. As on 3 October, total number of cases in the state was 50062, including 8076 active cases, 648 deaths and 41095 cures.
- As on 5 October, total number of cases in Uttarakhand was 51991, including 8701 active cases, 42368 cures and 699 deaths.
- As on 10 October, total number of cases was 54241, including 7321 active cases, 46186 cures and 734 deaths.
- As on 19 October, total number of cases was 57944, including 5527 active cases, 51486 cures and 933 deaths.
- As on 27 October, total number of cases was 60482, including 3865 active cases, 55610 cures and 1007 deaths.

=== November 2020 ===
- As on 8 November, total number of cases in Uttarakhand was 64706, including 3972 active cases, 59719 cures and 1016 deaths.
- As on 23 November, total number of cases was 70990, including 4298 active cases, 65530 recoveries and 1162 deaths.

=== December 2020 ===
- As on 2 December, total number of cases in Uttarakhand was 75044, including 4955 active cases, 68838 cures and 1251 deaths.
- As on 6 December, total number of cases was 77142, including 5223 active cases, 70634 recoveries and 1285 deaths.
- As on 15 December, total number of cases was 82510, including 6089 active cases, 75049 recoveries and 1372 deaths.
- As on 15 December, total number of cases was 82510, including 6089 active cases, 75049 recoveries and 1372 fatalities.
- As on 23 December, total number of cases was 86842, including 5507 active cases, 79888 recoveries and 1447 deaths.
- As on 30 December, total number of cases was 89434, including 4963 active cases, 82967 recoveries and 1504 deaths.
- As on 31 December, total number of cases was 89748, including 4719 active cases, 83506 cures and 1509 deaths.

=== January 2021 ===
- As on 5 January, total number of cases in Uttarakhand was 91144, including 3717 active cases, 85883 cures and 1544 deaths.
- As on 6 January, total number of cases was 91362, including 3515 active cases, 86298 cures and 1549 deaths.
- As on 21 January, total number of cases was 93928, including 1876 active cases, 90547 recoveries and 1626 deaths.

=== February 2021 ===
- As on 1 February, total number of cases in Uttarakhand was 94834, including 1081 active cases, 92105 recoveries and 1648 deaths.
- As on 14 February, total number of cases was 95202, including 564 active cases, 92956 recoveries and 1682 deaths.
- As on 20 February, total number of cases was 95272, including 454 active cases, 93142 cures and 1686 deaths.
- As on 23 February, total number of cases was 95381, including 423 active cases, 93268 recoveries and 1690 fatalities.

=== March 2021 ===
- As on 6 March, total number of cases in Uttarakhand was 95957, including 596 active cases, 93667 recoveries and 1694 deaths.
- As on 22 March, total number of cases was 97131, including 894 active cases, 94533 recoveries and 1704 deaths.
- As on 29 March, total number of cases was 98500, including 1724 active cases, 95065 recoveries and 1711 deaths.
- Chief Minister Tirath Singh Rawat tested positive for COVID-19 on 22 March

=== April 2021 ===
- As on 4 April, total number of cases in Uttarakhand was 100757, including 3017 active cases, 95973 recoveries and 1727 deaths.
- As on 13 April, total number of cases was 112071, including 9353 active cases, 98897 cures and 1780 deaths.
- On 15 April 2021, 30 sadhus had tested positive for COVID-19 during the Haridwar Kumbh Mela
- As on 20 April, total number of cases in the state was 126566, including 21014 active cases, 103633 recoveries and 1919 deaths.

=== May 2021 ===
- On 1 May, it was reported that Dehradun, Uttarakhand had the highest death rate per million population at 41 million, as compared to the national average of 2 million.
- As on 7 May, total number of cases in Uttarakhand was 225253, including 67691 active cases, 154132 recoveries and 3430 deaths.
- As on 11 May, total number of cases was 251968, including 54533 active cases, 238277 cures and 4085 deaths.
- As on 18 May, total number of cases was 290560, including 76232 active cases, 209196 cures and 5132 fatalities.
- As on 26 May, total number of cases was 315815, including 43520 active cases, 266182 recoveries and 6113 fatalities.

=== June 2021 ===
- As on 17 June, total number of cases in Uttarakhand was 338066, including 3471 active cases, 321807 recoveries and 7011 deaths.
- As on 25 June, total number of cases was 339373, including 2627 active cases, 323855 recoveries and 7083 deaths.

=== July 2021 ===
- As on 19 July, total number of cases in Uttarakhand is 341486, including 604 active cases, 321511 recoveries and 7357 deaths.

=== August 2021 ===
- As on 28 August, total number of cases in Uttarakhand is 342894, including 326 active cases, 329136 recoveries and 7380 deaths.

=== September 2021 ===
- As on 23 September, total number of cases in Uttarakhand was 343428, including 256 active cases, 329695 recoveries and 7391 deaths.
- As on 28 September, total number of cases was 343519, including 214 active cases, 329813 cures and 7393 deaths.

=== October to December 2021 ===
- As on 7 October, total number of cases in Uttarakhand was 343618, including 163 active cases, 329953 recoveries and 7396 deaths.
- As on 9 October, total number of cases was 343662, including 173 active cases, 329984 recoveries and 7396 deaths.
- As on 23 October, total number of cases was 343815, including 169 active cases, 330112 cures and 7398 deaths.
- As on 1 November, total number of cases was 343896, including 151 active cases, 330195 cures and 7400 fatalities.
- As on 29 December, total number of cases in the UT was 344843, including 227 active cases, 337200 recoveries and 7416 fatalities.

=== January to March 2022 ===
- As on 10 January, total number of cases in Uttarakhand was 350885, including 4118 active cases, 339343 recoveries and 7424 deaths.
- As on 16 January, total number of cases was 367272, including 14892 active cases, 344940 recoveries and 7440 deaths.
- As on 28 January, total number of cases was 415514, including 31086 active cases, 376907 cures and 7521 deaths.
- As on 8 February, total number of cases was 430935, including 10926 active cases, 412381 cures and 7628 fatal cases.
- As on 21 February, total number of cases in the Himalayan state was 435323, including 2476 active cases, 425183 cures and 7674 fatal cases.
- As on 19 March, total number of cases was 437018, including 653 active cases, 428676 cures and 7689 fatal cases.

=== April to June 2022 ===
- As on 11 April, total number of cases in Uttarakhand was 437297, including 451 active cases, 429154 recoveries and 7692 deaths.
- As on 30 April, total number of cases was 437490, including 475 active cases, 429322 cures and 7693 deaths.
- As on 12 May, total number of cases was 437650, including 480 active cases, 429477 recoveries and 7693 deaths.
- As on 17 May, total number of cases was 437722, including 518 active cases, 429511 cures and 7693 deaths.
- As on 28 May, total number of cases was 437862, including 484 active cases, 429685 recoveries and 7693 fatalities.
- As on 10 June, total number of cases in the state was 438066, including 560 active cases, 429813 recoveries and 7693 deaths.
- As on 22 June, total number of cases was 438351, including 644 active cases, 430012 recoveries and 7695 fatalities.

=== July to September 2022 ===
- As on 8 July, total number of cases in Uttarakhand was 439071, including 807 active cases, 430567 recoveries and 7697 fatalities.
- As on 26 August, total number of cases was 447931, including 1798 active cases, 438397 recoveries and 7736 deaths.
- As on 31 August, total number of cases was 448301, including 1367 active cases, 439195 cures and 7739 deaths.
- As on 10 September, total number of cases was 448783, including 1167 active cases, 439873 recoveries and 7743 deaths.
- As on 24 September, total number of cases was 449143, including 1083 active cases, 440310 recoveries and 7750 fatal cases.

== State Government Response ==
The Department of Medical Health and Family Welfare, Government of Uttarakhand has released guidelines on Covid-19 on their website.

The state has also formed a committee of experts to improve its responses to the spike in COVID-19 patients in the state.

=== Containment ===
On 24 March, the Uttarakhand Police sealed the hotel where IFS officials were staying. The Kanwar Yatra has been cancelled in view of the pandemic. As of 8 June, there are 55 containment centres in the state.

=== Screening and Contact Tracing ===
On 14 June, the state government stated that it would screen the entire population of Uttarakhand in the next ten days.

As of 8 June, 6,294 contact traces of 1,380 COVID-19 patients has been done in the state. 1,30,000 people are reportedly in quarantine, of which most are in-home quarantine.

=== Public Health Services ===
24 March: State government takes control of all private hospitals which have more than 100 beds and reserved 25% of these for COVID-19 patients.

The government has also approved Rs 578.34 lakh for an oxygen supply pipeline in the district and sub-district hospitals.

According to the Chief Secretary of Uttarakhand Utpal Kumar Singh, there are 20,000 COVID-19 beds of which 243 are with ICU, and only 126 with ventilators. It has been proposed that 150 ventilators are to be added. However, the Government Doon Medical College, Dehradun has been declared a 'Centre of excellence for clinical management of COVID-19' in the state. On 25 May, the Chief Minister of Uttarakhand Trivendra Singh Rawat had announced Rs 50 lakh for every hospital dealing with COVID-19 in the state.

==== Shortages ====
Primary Health Centres and Community Health Centres experienced a huge shortages of safety gear (PPE equipment) for health professionals. ASHA workers and other health professionals at the frontline too had to spend money from their pocket to buy sanitisers, gloves and masks. There was a dearth of staff and other medical professionals across urban and rural health care centres in the state.

=== Post-response ===
In view of the controversy around people opposing the last rites of individuals deceased because of COVID-19, the Governor of Uttarakhand Baby Rani Maurya has asked the state government to find a solution. The Chief Minister has stated that the cremation of individuals is being carried out under the guidelines of the Union Government, and that officials have been directed to open electric crematoriums in Haldwani and Haridwar, apart from Dehradun.

The state government has decided to audit every death related to the pandemic.

== COVID-19 Vaccines with Approval for Emergency or Conditional Usage ==
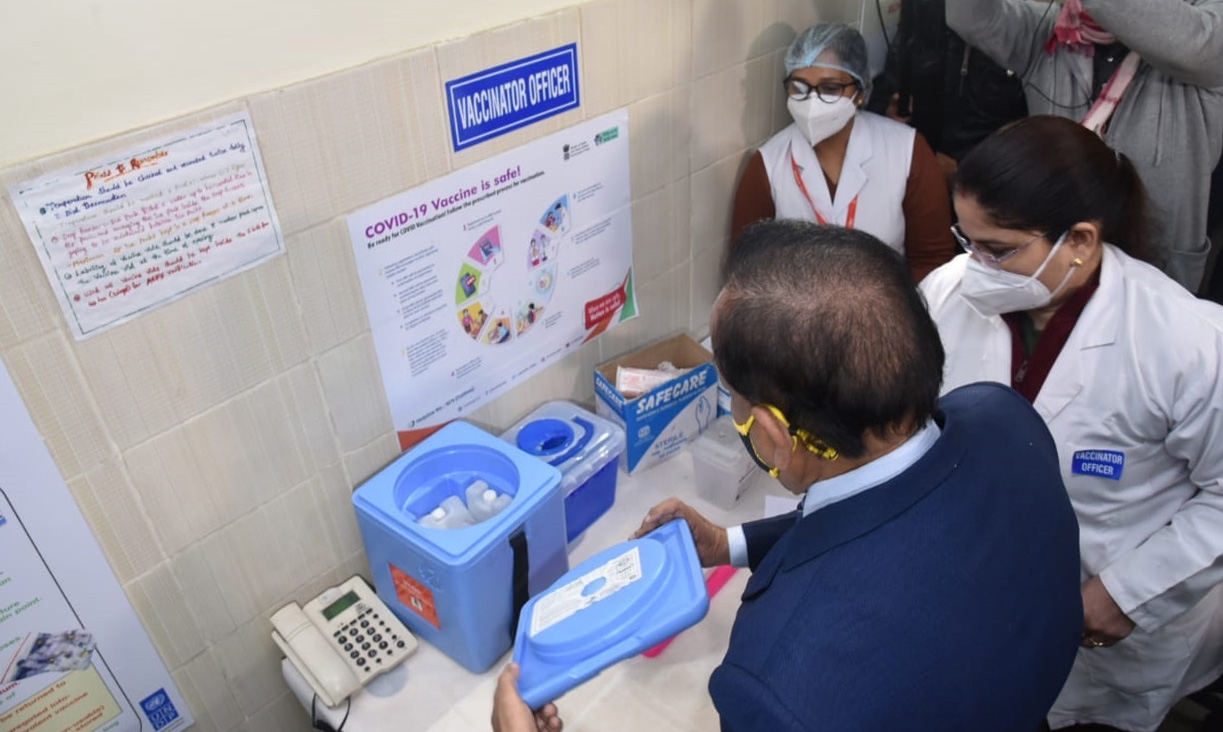
Union Minister for Health & Family Welfare, Dr. Harsh Vardhan visiting the GTB Hospital, Shahdara to review the preparedness of Dry Run of COVID-19 vaccine, in Delhi on January 02, 2021.

=== Covishield ===
On 1 January 2021, the Drug Controller General of India, approved the emergency or conditional use of AstraZeneca's COVID-19 vaccine AZD1222 (marketed as Covishield). Covishield is developed by the University of Oxford and its spin-out company, Vaccitech. It's a viral vector vaccine based on replication-deficient Adenovirus that causes cold in Chimpanzees. It can be stored, transported and handled at normal refrigerated conditions (two-eight degrees Celsius/ 36-46 degrees Fahrenheit). It has a shelf-life of at least six months.

On 12 January 2021 first batches of Covishield vaccine was despatched from the Serum Institute of India.

=== Covaxin ===
On 2 January 2021, BBV152 (marketed as Covaxin), first indigenous vaccine, developed by Bharat Biotech in association with the Indian Council of Medical Research and National Institute of Virology received approval from the Drug Controller General of India for its emergency or conditional usage.

On 14 January 2021 first batches of Covaxin vaccine was despatched from the Bharat Biotech, albeit it was still in the third phase of testing.

=== Others ===
On 19 May 2021, Dr Reddy's Labs received Emergency Use Authorisation for anti-COVID drug 2-DG. On 21 February 2022, Drugs Controller General of India granted approval to Biological E's COVID-19 vaccine Corbevax, that can be used for children between 12 and 18 years of age.

On 21 October 2021, India completed administering of one billion Covid vaccines in the country.

On 8 January 2022, India crossed 1.5 billion Covid vaccines milestone in the country.

On 19 February 2022, India crossed 1.75 billion Covid vaccines milestone in the country.

== See also ==
- COVID-19 pandemic in India
- COVID-19 pandemic
