= Timeline of the COVID-19 pandemic in India =

Timeline of the COVID-19 pandemic in the India may refer to these timeslines of the COVID-19 pandemic in India:

- Timeline of the COVID-19 pandemic in India (January–May 2020)
- Timeline of the COVID-19 pandemic in India (June–December 2020)
- Timeline of the COVID-19 pandemic in India (2021)
