= Snehasikta Swarnakar =

Indian chemical biologist

- Born: 1963 (age 62–63); West Bengal, India
- Education: Jadavpur University; University of California, Davis; Marine Biological Laboratory
- Known for: Studies on gastric, ovarian, head and neck cancers
- Awards: 2007 N-BIOS Prize
- Scientific career
- Fields: Chemical biology; Cancer biology
- Workplaces: Stony Brook University; Scripps Research Institute; University of Connecticut; Indian Institute of Chemical Biology; University of Calcutta

Snehasikta Swarnakar (born 1963) is an Indian chemical biologist and the senior principal scientist at the Division of Cancer Biology and Inflammatory Disorder of the Indian Institute of Chemical Biology. Known for her studies in the field of gastric, ovarian, head and neck cancers, Swarnakar is an elected fellow of the National Academy of Sciences, India and the West Bengal Academy of Science and Technology. The Department of Biotechnology of the Government of India awarded her the National Bioscience Award for Career Development, one of the highest Indian science awards, for her contributions to biosciences in 2007.

== Biography ==
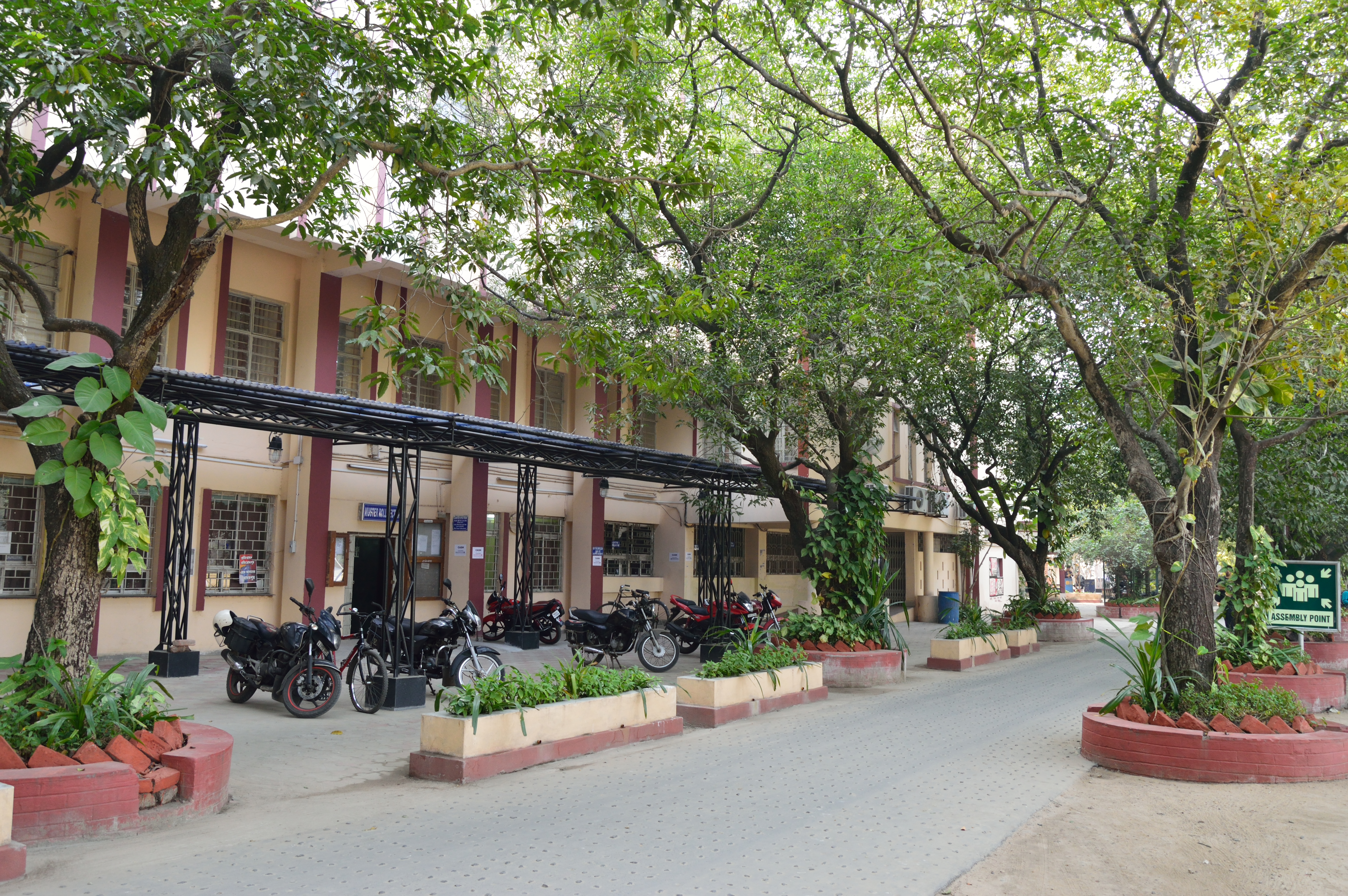
Aurobindo Bhavan - Main Administrative Building - Jadavpur University.

Snehasikta Swarnakar, born in 1963 in the Indian state of West Bengal, secured a PhD in 1993 from Jadavpur University for her thesis, Studies on a sialic acid-binding lectin from albumin gland of apple snail Pila globosa, working on junior and senior research fellowships from the Council of Scientific and Industrial Research and moved to the US for her post-doctoral work which she completed at the University of California, Davis and Marine Biological Laboratory during 1994–97. She started her career in 1997 as a research scientist at the Stony Brook University where she worked until 2001 and on her return to India, she joined the Division of Cancer Biology and Inflammatory Disorder of the Indian Institute of Chemical Biology where she holds the position of a senior principal scientist. In between, she had two stints as a visiting scientist abroad; first at the Scripps Research Institute in 2002 and then at the University of Connecticut in 2007. She is also a visiting professor at the Department of Environmental Science of the University of Calcutta.

Swarnakar resides along Lake Road in Kolkata.

== Legacy ==
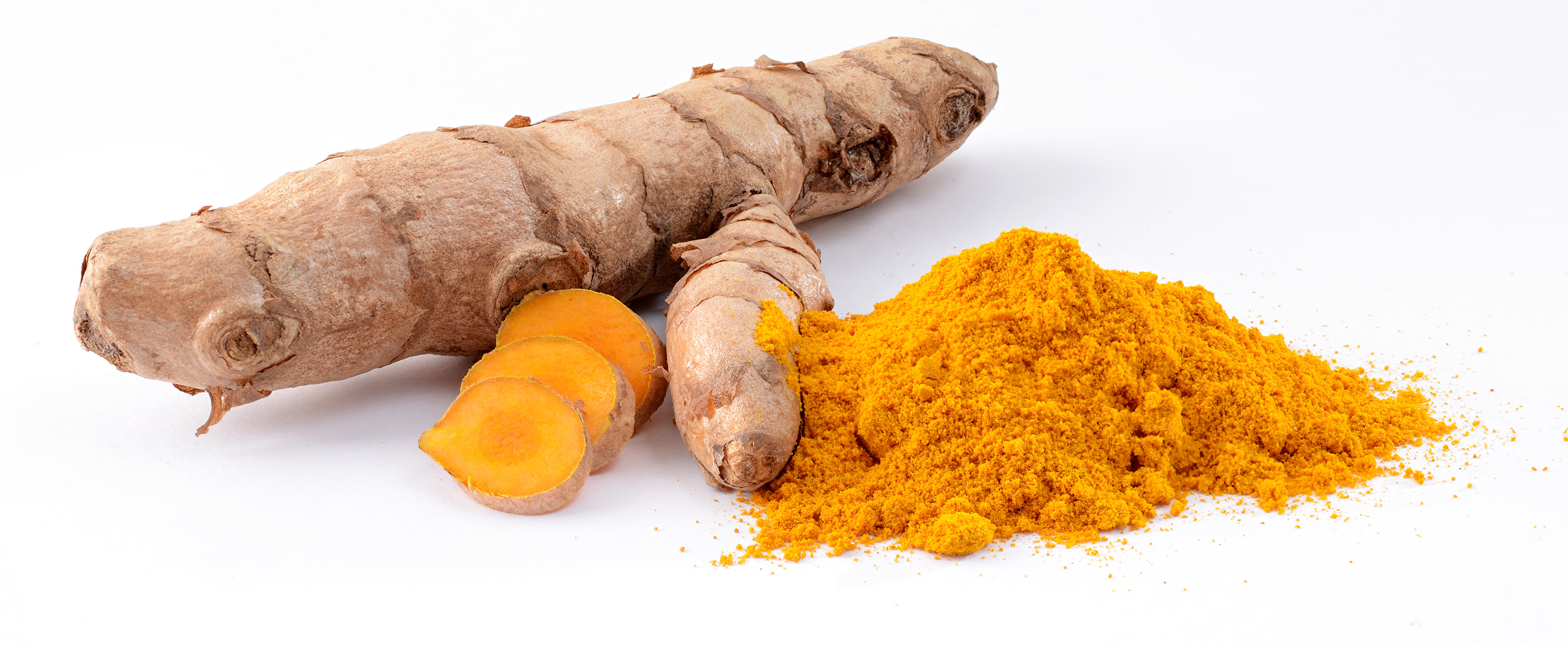
Turmeric rhizome and powder

Swarnakar's research is focused on cancer biology and she is known to have conducted basic and translational research on various types of cancers such as lung, brain, oral, breast, pancreatic, blood and cervical cancers. She led a team of scientists who worked on the therapeutic properties of turmeric and they identified that the controlled dosage of curcumin, an ingredient of turmeric which gave the rhizome its yellow color, acted as a therapeutic agent for gastric inflammation and ulceration. They demonstrated that curcumin increased MMP2 enzyme level while deceasing the MMP9 enzyme, thus ensured balance of the two enzymes which acted in opposite ways in the formation of new blood vessels. They also proposed a treatment protocol for gastric ulcers with the use of nanocapsules and antioxidants where quercetin, an antioxidant present in apples, tomatoes and onions is administered through nanocapsules to treat ethanol-induced gastric ulcers. (Note: The antioxidant cleaned the reactive oxygen species (ROS), a chemically reactive species that contained oxygen) Her studies have been documented by way of a number of articles (Note: Please see Selected bibliography section) and ResearchGate, an online repository of scientific articles has listed 103 of them. Besides, she has contributed chapters to books edited by others. She has also delivered invited or plenary speeches at science conferences and has mentored several scholars in their post-graduate and doctoral studies.

Swarnakar is member of the governing body of the ANB Memorial Foundation, a trust in memory of Amar Nath Bhaduri, the noted chemical biologist she was the secretary of the organizing committee of the 2nd International Meet on Advanced Studies on Cell Signaling Network (CeSiN 2014) held in Kolkata. She is the treasurer of the West Bengal Academy of Science and Technology and sits in the council of the Chemical Biology Society. She is also a life member of the Indian Science Congress Association, the Biotech Research Society, India, the Society for Free Radical Research, the International Society for Computational Biology and the Society of Biological Chemists, India.

== Awards and honors ==
The Department of Biotechnology of the Government of India awarded her the National Bioscience Award for Career Development, one of the highest Indian science awards in 2007. She was elected as a fellow by the National Academy of Sciences, India in 2012 and was one of the team members of Anirban Bandyopadhyay who won the Palo Alto Longevity Prize in 2013. She is also an elected fellow of the West Bengal Academy of Science and Technology.

== Selected bibliography ==
=== Chapters ===
- Naranjan S. Dhalla; Sajal Chakraborti (Eds); Sibani Sarkar, Somnath Chatterjee, Snehasikta Swarnakar (chapter authors) (22 November 2013). "Matrix Metalloproteinases in Ischemia - Reperfusion Injury in Brain: Anti-oxidants as Rescuer". Role of Proteases in Cellular Dysfunction. Springer Science & Business Media. pp. 67–. ISBN 978-1-4614-9099-9.
- Satya Prakash Gupta (Ed.); Snehasikta Swarnakar, Amartya Mishra, Susri Ray Chaudhuri (Eds) (7 April 2012). "The Gelatinases and Their Inhibitors: The Structure–Activity Relationships". Matrix Metalloproteinase Inhibitors: Specificity of Binding and Structure-Activity Relationships. Experientia Supplementum. Vol. 103. Springer Science & Business Media. pp. 57–82. doi:10.1007/978-3-0348-0364-9_3. ISBN 978-3-0348-0363-2.

=== Articles ===
- Ganguly, Krishnendu; Maity, Pallab; Reiter, Russel J; Swarnakar, Snehasikta (1 October 2005). "Effect of melatonin on secreted and induced matrix metalloproteinase-9 and -2 activity during prevention of indomethacin-induced gastric ulcer". Journal of Pineal Research. 39 (3): 307–315. doi:10.1111/j.1600-079x.2005.00250.x. ISSN 1600-079X. PMID 16150113. S2CID 22748433.
- Armstrong, P.B.; Melchior, R.; Swarnakar, S.; Quigley, J.P. (1998). "α2-Macroglobulin does not function as a C3 homologue in the plasma hemolytic system of the American horseshoe crab, Limulus". Molecular Immunology. 35 (1): 47–53. doi:10.1016/s0161-5890(98)80016-3. PMID 9683263.
- Armstrong, Peter B.; Swarnakar, Snehasikta; Srimal, Subita; Misquith, Sandra; Hahn, Elizabeth A.; Aimes, Ronald T.; Quigley, James P. (21 June 1996). "A Cytolytic Function for a Sialic Acid-binding Lectin That Is a Member of the Pentraxin Family of Proteins". Journal of Biological Chemistry. 271 (25): 14717–14721. doi:10.1074/jbc.271.25.14717. ISSN 0021-9258. PMID 8662968.

== See also ==
- Causes of cancer
- Cancer syndrome
