= VRDL =

VRDL may refer to:

- Victorian Roller Derby League
- Viral Research and Diagnostic Laboratories
