= COVID-19 pandemic in Sikkim =

COVID-19 in Sikkim, India

- Disease: COVID-19
- Pathogen: SARS-CoV-2
- Location: Sikkim, India
- First outbreak: Wuhan, Hubei, China
- Arrival date: 23 May 2020 (6 years and 4 months)
- Territories: All 4 districts

Government website
- www.covid19sikkim.org

The first case of the COVID-19 pandemic in India was reported on 30 January 2020, originating from China. Slowly, the pandemic spread to various states and union territories including the state of Sikkim.

== Timeline ==
Below is the timeline of the cases of Sikkim:

Major events of COVID-19 pandemic in Sikkim
18 March 2020	Closure of all Educational Institutions.
21 May 2020	Inaugurated Viral Research and Diagnostic Laboratories at STNM Hospital
23 May 2020	First case confirmed in the state
25 June 2020	More than 10000 samples had been tested
11 July 2020	Starts first Rapid antigen test
26 July 2020	First death confirmed in the state and Lockdown extend till 1 August
10 August 2020	Total recovery crossed 500
14 August 2020	Total confirmed cases crossed 1000
23 November 2020	Total death 100 in the state
17 May 2021	Started complete lockdown in Sikkim.

=== May 2020 ===
- The first case was recorded in this region on 23 May 2020.

=== June 2020 ===
- As of 3 June, the total number of cases in Sikkim was two, both of them active.
- As of 7 June, the total number of cases was seven, all of them active.
- As of 12 June, the total number of cases was 27, including 24 active cases and three recoveries.
- As of 17 June, the total number of cases was 70, including 65 active cases and 5 recoveries.
- As of 23 June, the total of cases was 78, including 49 active cases and 29 have recovered.
- As of 26 June, the total number of cases was 85, including 46 active cases and 39 have recovered.

=== July 2020 ===
- As of 2 July, the total number of cases in Sikkim was 101, including 48 active cases and 53 have recovered.
- As of 6 July, the total number of cases was 123, including 62 active cases and 61 have recovered.
- As of 7 July, the total number of cases was 125, including 60 active cases and 65 have recovered.
- As of 8 July, the total number of cases was 133, including 68 active cases and 65 cures.
- As of 11 July, the total number of cases was 151, including 70 active cases and 81 recoveries.
- As of 14 July, the total number of cases was 192, including 106 active cases and 86 recoveries.
- As of 15 July, the total number of cases was 209, including 112 active cases and 87 recoveries.
- As of 18 July, the total number of cases in Sikkim was 273, including 183 active cases and 90 cures.
- As of 22 July, the total number of cases in Sikkim was 438, including 326 active cases and 112 cures.
- As of 25 July, the total number of cases was 499, including 357 active cases and 142 recoveries.
- As of 26 July, the total number of cases was 545, including One death, 397 active cases and 147 recoveries.
- As of 27 July, the total number of cases was 555, including One death, 380 active cases and 174 recoveries.
- As of 28 July, the total number of cases was 579, including One death, 392 active cases and 186 recoveries.
- As of 29 July, the total number of cases was 596, including One death, 397 active cases and 198 recoveries.
- As of 30 July, the total number of cases was 610, including One death, 395 active cases and 214 recoveries.
- As of 31 July, the total number of cases was 639, including One death,407 active cases and 231 recoveries.

=== August 2020 ===
- As of 1 August, the total number of cases in Sikkim was 650, including 380 active cases and 269 have recovered. There has one 1 fatality so far.
- As of 4 August, the total number of cases in Sikkim was 783, including 483 active cases, 299 recoveries and one 1 fatality.
- As of 6 August, the total number of cases was 829, including 475 active cases, 353 recoveries and 1 death.
- As of 9 August, the total number of cases was 866, including 371 active cases, 494 recoveries and 1 death.
- As of 10 August, the total number of cases was 910, including 399 active cases, 510 recoveries and 1 death.
- As of 12 August, the total number of cases was 930, including 379 active cases, 550 cures and 1 death.
- As of 14 August, the total number of cases was 1080, including 456 active cases, 623 recoveries and 1 death. On this day, total number of cases in Sikkim crossed 1000 mark.
- As of 15 August, the total number of cases was 1148, including 486 active cases, 661 recoveries and 1 death.
- As of 19 August, the total number of cases in the state was 1232, including 440 active cases, 789 recoveries and 3 fatalities.
- As of 21 August, the total number of cases was 1336, including 440 active cases, 834 recoveries and 3 deaths.
- As of 22 August, the total number of cases was 1381, including 507 active cases, 871 recoveries and 3 deaths.
- As of 24 August, the total number of cases was 1403, including 529 active cases, 871 recoveries and 3 deaths.
- As of 25 August, the total number of cases in the state was 1475, including 475 active cases, 1057 cures and 3 fatalities.

=== September 2020 ===
- As of 1 September, the total number of cases in Sikkim was 1670, including 429 active cases, 1237 recoveries and 4 deaths.
- As of 6 September, the total number of cases was 1910, including 534 active cases, 1371 cures and 5 deaths.
- As of 11 September, the total number of cases was 2026, including 529 active cases, 1486 cures and 11 deaths.
- As of 16 September, the total number of cases was 2221, including 480 active cases, 1722 cures and 19 deaths.
- As of 23 September, the total number of cases was 2568, including 576 active cases, 1942 cures and 30 deaths.

=== October 2020 ===
- As of 2 October, the total number of cases in Sikkim was 3011, including 642 active cases and 2328 have recovered and 41 deaths.
- As of 7 October, the total number of was 3153, including 568 active cases and 2534 have recovered and 51 deaths.
- As of 14 October, the total number of was 3368, including 325 active cases and 2994 have recovered and 59 deaths.
- As of 26 October, the total number of was 3753, including 246 active cases and 3443 have recovered and 64 deaths.
- As of 30 October, the total number of was 3831, including 255 active cases and 3509 have recovered and 67 deaths.

=== November 2020 ===
- As of 8 November, the total number of cases in Sikkim was 4162, including 274 active cases and 3810 have recovered and 78 deaths.
- As of 10 November, the total number of cases was 4224, including 305 active cases and 3839 recoveries and 80 deaths.
- As of 23 November, the total number of cases was 4650, including 230 active cases and 4320 recoveries and 100 deaths.

=== December 2020 ===
- As of 2 December, the total number of cases in Sikkim was 4986, including 303 active cases and 4572 have recovered and 111 deaths.
- On 3 December, total number of cases in Sikkim crossed grim milestone of 5000 mark.
- As of 8 December, the total number of cases is 5131, including 371 active cases and 4619 have recovered and 117 deaths.
- As of 13 December, the total number of cases is 5244, including 356 active cases and 4770 recoveries and 118 deaths.
- As of 17 December, the total number of cases is 5312, including 294 active cases and 4896 cures and 122 deaths.
- As of 23 December, the total number of cases is 5538, including 397 active cases and 5016 cures and 125 deaths.
- As of 28 December, the total number of cases is 5769, including 549 active cases and 5094 cures and 126 deaths.
- As of 31 December, the total number of cases is 5795, including 529 active cases and 5139 cures and 127 deaths.

=== January 2021 ===
- As of 6 January, the total number of cases in Sikkim was 5856, including 464 active cases and 5263 recoveries and 129 deaths.
- As of 11 January, the total number of cases was 5889, including 322 active cases and 5443 have recovered and 129 deaths.
- As of 22 January, the total number of cases was 5968, including 140 active cases and 5697 have recovered and 131 fatalities.

=== February 2021 ===
- As of 1 February, the total number of cases in Sikkim was 5996, including 84 active cases and 5779 recoveries and 133 deaths.
- As of 8 February, the total number of cases was 6015, including 67 active cases and 5813 recoveries and 135 deaths.
- As of 20 February, the total number of cases was 6031, including 53 active cases and 5843 recoveries and 135 deaths.

=== March 2021 ===
- As of 6 March, the total number of cases in Sikkim was 6070, including 44 active cases and 5891 recoveries and 135 fatalities.
- As of 22 March, the total number of cases was 6109, including 50 active cases and 5924 recoveries and 135 deaths.
- As of 29 March, the total number of cases was 6130, including 43 active cases and 5952 recoveries and 135 deaths.

=== April 2021 ===
- As of 4 April, the total number of cases in Sikkim was 6156, including 51 active cases and 5970 recoveries and 135 fatalities.
- As of 12 April, the total number of cases was 6293, including 174 active cases and 5983 recoveries and 136 deaths.

=== May 2021 ===
- As of 9 May, the total number of cases in Sikkim was 9673, including 2637 active cases and 6869 recoveries and 167 deaths.
- On 11 May, total number of cases in Sikkim crossed grim milestone of 10000 mark. As of 11 May, the total number of cases in the state was 10165, including 2741 active cases and 7042 recoveries and 177 deaths.
- As of 18 May, the total number of cases was 11481, including 3052 active cases and 8217 cures and 212 deaths.
- As of 27 May, the total number of cases is 14010, including 3612 active cases and 10158 cures and 240 deaths.

=== June 2021 ===
- As of 17 June, the total number of cases in Sikkim was 18646, including 2907 active cases and 15452 recoveries and 287 deaths.
- As of 26 June, the total number of cases in Sikkim was 19941, including 2170 active cases and 17218 recoveries and 301 have died.

=== July 2021 ===
- As of 13 July, the total number of cases in Sikkim was 22623, including 2281 active cases and 19767 recoveries and 317 deaths.

=== August 2021 ===
- As of 30 August, the total number of cases in Sikkim was 29841, including 1186 active cases and 28003 recoveries and 370 deaths.

=== September 2021 ===
- As of 23 September, the total number of cases in Sikkim was 31074, including 642 active cases and 29741 recoveries and 381 deaths.
- As of 26 September, the total number of cases in Sikkim was 31226, including 617 active cases and 29911 recoveries and 385 deaths.

=== Oct to Dec 2021 ===
- As of 7 October, the total number of cases in Sikkim was 31585, including 383 active cases and 30498 recoveries and 388 deaths.
- As of 23 October, the total number of cases was 31868, including 195 active cases and 30960 cures and 394 deaths.
- As of 2 November, the total number of cases was 31979, including 195 active cases and 31063 cures and 396 fatalities.
- As of 4 December, the total number of cases was 32343, including 206 active cases and 31734 recoveries and 403 fatalities.
- As of 29 December, the total number of cases was 32483, including 53 active cases and 32021 recoveries and 409 deaths.

=== Jan to Mar 2022 ===
- As of 9 January, the total number of cases in Sikkim was 32649, including 152 active cases and 32088 recoveries and 409 deaths.
- As of 15 January, the total number of cases was 34399, including 1726 active cases and 32260 cures and 413 fatal cases.
- As of 28 January, the total number of cases was 37816, including 1450 active cases and 35938 cures and 428 deaths.
- As of 8 February, the total number of cases was 38784, including 568 active cases and 37779 recoveries and 437 deaths.
- As of 21 February, the total number of cases was 39030, including 119 active cases and 38470 recoveries and 441 fatalities.
- As of 25 February, the total number of cases was 39060, including 78 active cases and 38540 recoveries and 442 fatalities.
- As of 19 March, the total number of cases was 39113, including 13 active cases and 38651 recoveries and 449 deaths.

=== Apr to Jun 2022 ===
- As of 11 April, the total number of cases in Sikkim was 39144, including 2 active cases and 38690 recoveries and 452 deaths.
- As of 18 April, the total number of cases was 39148, including 4 active cases and 38692 recoveries and 452 deaths.
- As of 1 May, the total number of cases was 39153, including 4 active cases and 38697 cures and 452 deaths.
- As of 12 May, the total number of cases was 39154, including 1 active case and 38701 cures and 452 deaths.
- As of 28 May, the total number of cases was 39165, including no active case and 38713 cures and 452 deaths. There hasn't been any Covid death in the state of Sikkim in more than 2 months.
- As of 9 June, the total number of cases was 39175, including 9 active cases and 38713 cures and 453 fatal cases.
- As of 16 June, the total number of cases was 39188, including 12 active cases and 38723 cures and 453 fatal cases.

=== July to December 2022 ===
- As of 8 July, the total number of cases in Sikkim was 39342, including 101 active cases and 38785 recoveries and 456 fatal cases.
- As of 26 August, the total number of cases was 43581, including 214 active cases and 42882 recoveries and 485 deaths.
- As of 31 August, the total number of cases was 43714, including 146 active cases and 43079 cures and 489 fatal cases.
- As of 10 September, the total number of cases was 43906, including 77 active cases and 43335 recoveries and 494 fatal cases.
- As of 24 September, the total number of cases was 44125, including 84 active cases and 43545 recoveries and 496 deaths.

=== 2023 ===
- As of 22 March, the total number of cases in Sikkim was 44333, including 4 active cases and 43829 recoveries and 500 fatal cases.

== Containment zones ==
- On 8 July 2020, State authorities declared 130 RCC, General Reserve Engineer Force (GREF) Compound of Rongli, East Sikkim notified as containment zone after 6 new positive COVID-19 Cases.
- On 11 July 2020, Rongli Bazar, East Sikkim had been declared containment zones due to the detection of 26 more positive COVID-19 cases at 130 RCC, General Reserve Engineer Force (GREF) Compound of nearby Rongli Bazar.
- On 15 July 2020, Sikkim CM called for enforcement of complete lockdown in Rongli and Pakyong subdivisions in East Sikkim due to the recent spike in cases in these subdivisions.

== COVID-19 vaccines with approval for emergency or conditional usage ==
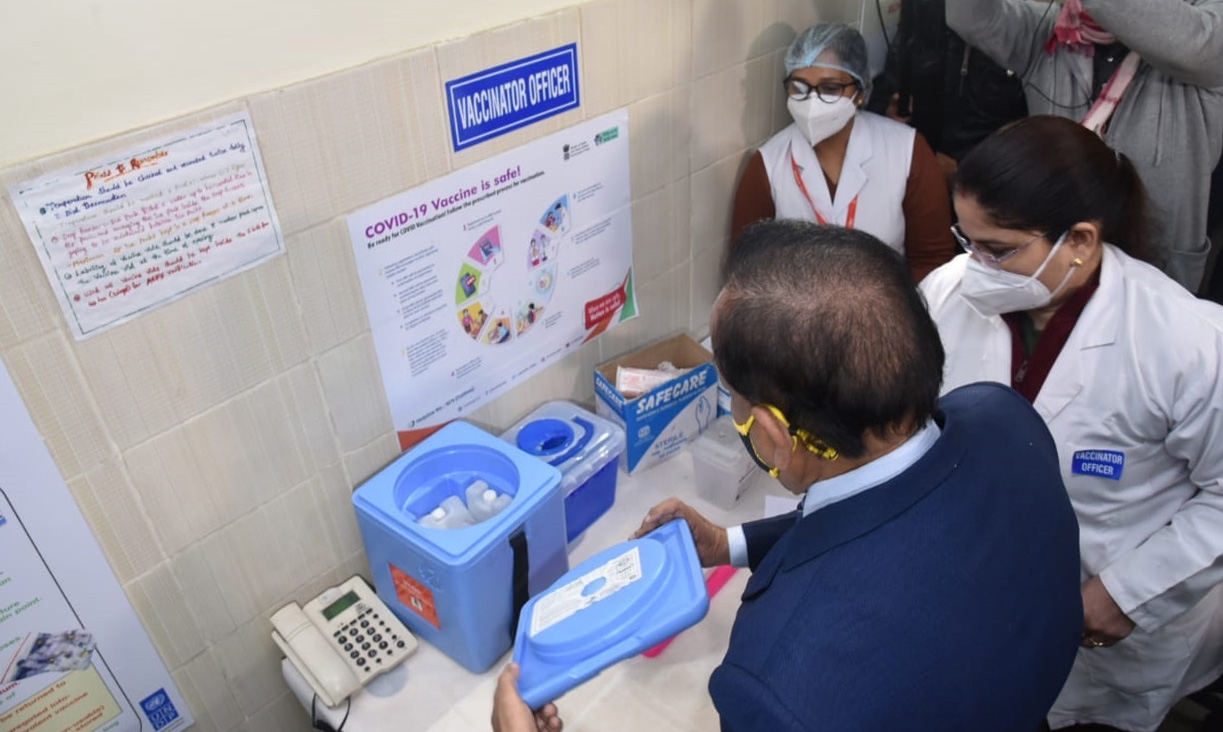
Union Minister for Health & Family Welfare, Dr. Harsh Vardhan visiting the GTB Hospital, Shahdara to review the preparedness of Dry Run of COVID-19 vaccine, in Delhi on January 02, 2021.

=== Covishield ===
On 1 January 2021, the Drug Controller General of India, approved the emergency or conditional use of AstraZeneca's COVID-19 vaccine AZD1222 (marketed as Covishield). Covishield is developed by the University of Oxford and its spin-out company, Vaccitech. It's a viral vector vaccine based on replication-deficient Adenovirus that causes cold in Chimpanzees. It can be stored, transported and handled at normal refrigerated conditions (two-eight degrees Celsius/ 36-46 degrees Fahrenheit). It has a shelf-life of at least six months.

On 12 January 2021, first batches of Covishield vaccine were despatched from the Serum Institute of India.

=== Covaxin ===
On 2 January 2021, BBV152 (marketed as Covaxin), first indigenous vaccine, developed by Bharat Biotech in association with the Indian Council of Medical Research and National Institute of Virology received approval from the Drug Controller General of India for its emergency or conditional usage.

On 14 January 2021, first batches of Covaxin vaccine were despatched from the Bharat Biotech, albeit it was still in the third phase of testing.

=== Others ===
On 19 May 2021, Dr Reddy's Labs received Emergency Use Authorisation for anti-COVID drug 2-DG. On 21 February 2022, Drugs Controller General of India granted approval to Biological E's COVID-19 vaccine Corbevax, that can be used for children between 12 and 18 years of age.

On 21 October 2021, India completed administering of one billion Covid vaccines in the country.

On 8 January 2022, India crossed 1.5 billion Covid vaccines milestone in the country.

On 19 February 2022, India crossed 1.75 billion Covid vaccines milestone in the country.

== See also ==
- COVID-19 pandemic in India
- COVID-19 pandemic
- COVID-19 vaccination in India
