= Acetoin—ribose-5-phosphate transaldolase =

Class of enzymes

Acetoin-ribose-5-phosphate transaldolase

Identifiers
- EC no.: 2.2.1.4
- CAS no.: 87843-76-3

Databases
- IntEnz: IntEnz view
- BRENDA: BRENDA entry
- ExPASy: NiceZyme view
- KEGG: KEGG entry
- MetaCyc: metabolic pathway
- PRIAM: profile
- PDB structures: RCSB PDB PDBe PDBsum
- Gene Ontology: AmiGO / QuickGO
Search
- PMC: articles
- PubMed: articles
- NCBI: proteins

Acetoin-ribose-5-phosphate transaldolase (EC 2.2.1.4) is an enzyme that catalyzes a chemical reaction whch produces 1-deoxy-D-altro-heptulose phosphate from the sugar phosphate, ribose 5-phosphate and acetoin, with acetaldehyde as a byproduct. The enzyme was characterised from Bacillus pumilus.

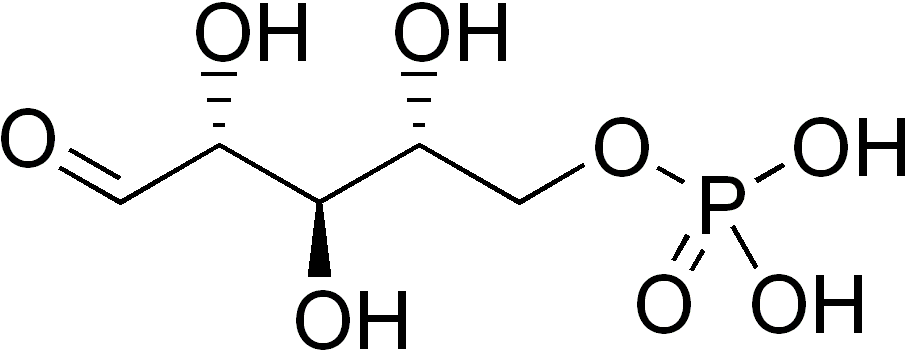
ribose 5-phosphate
+
acetoin
1-deoxy-D-altro-heptulose 7-phosphate
+
acetaldehyde

This enzyme belongs to the family of transferases, specifically those transferring aldehyde or ketonic groups (transaldolases and transketolases, respectively). The systematic name of this enzyme class is 3-hydroxybutan-2-one:D-ribose-5-phosphate aldehydetransferase. Other names in common use include 1-deoxy-D-altro-heptulose-7-phosphate synthetase, 1-deoxy-D-altro-heptulose-7-phosphate synthase, 3-hydroxybutan-2-one:D-ribose-5-phosphate aldehydetransferase [wrong, and substrate name]. It uses one cofactor, thiamin diphosphate.
