= Protein-Npi-phosphohistidine-sugar phosphotransferase =

protein-N(PI)-phosphohistidine-sugar phosphotransferase

Identifiers
- EC no.: 2.7.1.69
- CAS no.: 37278-09-4

Databases
- IntEnz: IntEnz view
- BRENDA: BRENDA entry
- ExPASy: NiceZyme view
- KEGG: KEGG entry
- MetaCyc: metabolic pathway
- PRIAM: profile
- PDB structures: RCSB PDB PDBe PDBsum
- Gene Ontology: AmiGO / QuickGO
Search
- PMC: articles
- PubMed: articles
- NCBI: proteins

In enzymology, a protein-Npi-phosphohistidine-sugar phosphotransferase (EC 2.7.1.69) is an enzyme that catalyzes the chemical reaction

protein Npi-phospho-L-histidine + sugar $\rightleftharpoons$ protein histidine + sugar phosphate

Thus, the two substrates of this enzyme are protein Npi-phospho-L-histidine and sugar, whereas its two products are protein histidine and sugar phosphate.

This enzyme belongs to the family of transferases, specifically those transferring phosphorus-containing groups (phosphotransferases) with an alcohol group as acceptor. The systematic name of this enzyme class is protein-Npi-phosphohistidine:sugar Npi-phosphotransferase. Other names in common use include glucose permease, PTS permease, phosphotransferase, phosphohistidinoprotein-hexose, enzyme IIl4ac, gene glC proteins, gene bglC RNA formation factors, PEP-dependent phosphotransferase enzyme II, PEP-sugar phosphotransferase enzyme II, phosphoenolpyruvate-sugar phosphotransferase enzyme II, phosphohistidinoprotein-hexose phosphotransferase, phosphohistidinoprotein-hexose phosphoribosyltransferase, phosphoprotein factor-hexose phosophotransferase, protein, specific or class, gene bglC, ribonucleic acid formation factor, gene glC, sucrose phosphotransferase system II, and protein-Npi-phosphohistidine:sugar N-pros-phosphotransferase. This enzyme participates in 7 metabolic pathways: glycolysis / gluconeogenesis, fructose and mannose metabolism, galactose metabolism, ascorbate and aldarate metabolism, starch and sucrose metabolism, aminosugars metabolism, and phosphotransferase system (pts).

== Structural studies ==
As of late 2007, 29 structures have been solved for this class of enzymes, with PDB accession codes 1A3A, 1A6J, 1AX3, 1BLE, 1E2A, 1E2B, 1F3Z, 1GGR, 1GLA, 1GLB, 1GLC, 1GLD, 1GLE, 1GPR, 1H9C, 1IBA, 1IIB, 1NRZ, 1O2F, 1O53, 1PDO, 1TVM, 1VRC, 1WCR, 2A0J, 2E2A, 2F3G, 2FEW, and 2GPR.
