= Vibha Tandon =

Indian scientist and academician

Vibha Tandon is an Indian scientist and academic known for her contributions to the field of chemistry and molecular medicine. As of 2024 she is the director of CSIR-Indian Institute of Chemical Biology and has previously held the position of chair of the Special Centre for Molecular Medicine, Jawaharlal Nehru University in New Delhi, India.

== Education ==
Tandon completed her Bachelor of Science degree in chemistry, Zoology, and Botany from T.D. College, Deen Dayal Upadhyay Gorakhpur University in 1984. She obtained a Master of Science degree in Organic Chemistry from the same institution in 1986. In 1991, she earned her Doctor of Philosophy degree from the Department of Chemistry at the University of Allahabad, India.

== Career ==
Tandon joined the Delhi University in 2009, where she was promoted to professor in 2013. In 2014 she moved to Jawaharlal Nehru University as a professor. In 2023 she was named the director of the CSIR Indian Institute of Chemical Biology.

== Selected publications ==
- Tiwari, Manisha; Tandon, Vibha (2004). Medicinal Plants. Vol. 1. Delhi: Gyan Publishing House. ISBN 978-81-8205-097-6.
- Gupta, Rajesh Kumar; Kesari, Achyut Narayan; Murthy, P. S.; Chandra, R.; Tandon, V.; Watal, Geeta (13 May 2005). "Hypoglycemic and antidiabetic effect of ethanolic extract of leaves of Annona squamosa L. in experimental animals". Journal of Ethnopharmacology. 99 (1): 75–81. doi:10.1016/j.jep.2005.01.048. ISSN 0378-8741. PMID 15848023.
- Shokeen, Poonam; Anand, Prachi; Murali, Y. Krishna; Tandon, Vibha (1 November 2008). "Antidiabetic activity of 50% ethanolic extract of Ricinus communis and its purified fractions". Food and Chemical Toxicology. 46 (11): 3458–3466. doi:10.1016/j.fct.2008.08.020. ISSN 0278-6915. PMID 18790711.
- Kamran, Mohammad Zahid; Ranjan, Atul; Kaur, Navrinder; Sur, Souvik; Tandon, Vibha (2016). "Radioprotective Agents: Strategies and Translational Advances". Medicinal Research Reviews. 36 (3): 461–493. doi:10.1002/med.21386. ISSN 0198-6325. PMID 26807693.

== Honors and awards ==
Tandon was elected a member of the National Academy of Sciences, India in 2023.

== Criticism and Controversy ==
Recent developments at the Indian Institute of Chemical Biology have brought significant attention to the leadership of Tandon as director. PhD students have reported that Tandon's tenure has been marked by persistent verbal abuse, creating a hostile and demoralizing environment for scholars and staff. Scholars have claimed there has been a significant drop in the institute's academic output since Tandon took over as director. This decline has raised concerns about the institute's reputation and effectiveness in research. However, In December 2025, she organised an international conference on Redox biology and its implications on Health and Diseases along with the 19th Annual meeting of the Society for Free-Radical research at IICB. Several internationally recognised scientists including Prof. P. Balaram and Prof. G. Mugesh from IISc delivered lectures. Subject matter included in-vivo generation of free-radicals in living systems in the context of the Indian population.
