= Amar Nath Bhaduri =

Indian molecular enzymologist and chemical biologist

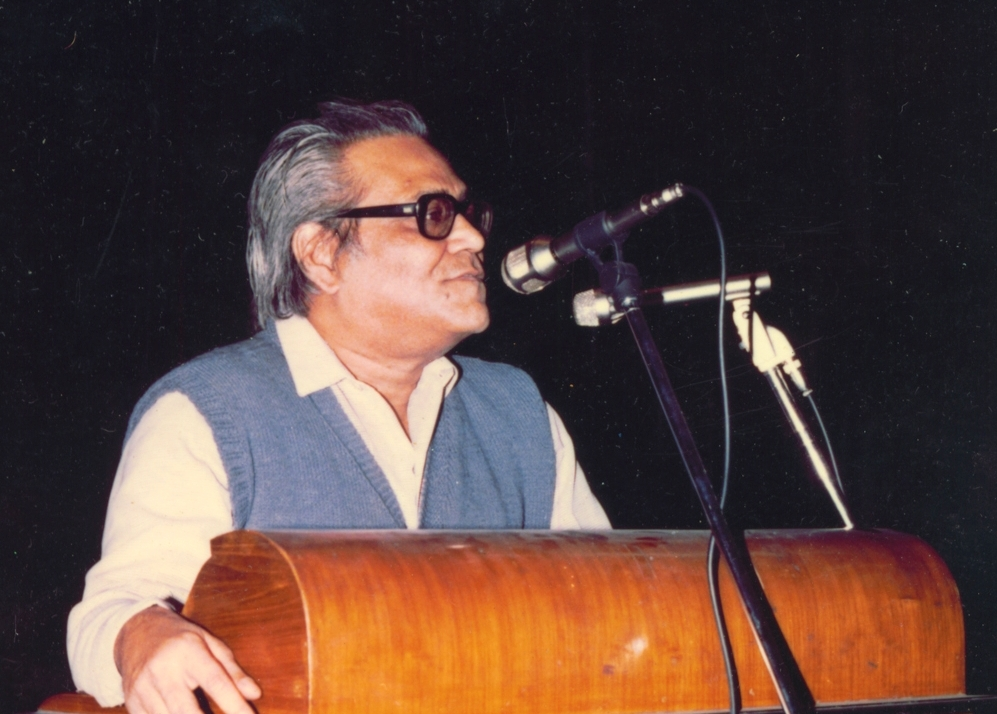
- Born: 12 November 1935; Shyambazar, West Bengal, India
- Died: 6 June 2003 (aged 67); Kolkata, West Bengal, India
- Education: Scottish Church Collegiate School; Presidency College; Rajabazar Science College; University of Michigan, Ann Arbor; Harvard Medical School
- Known for: Studies on UDP-glucose 4-epimerase
- Awards: 1979 Shanti Swarup Bhatnagar Prize; 1995 INSA Jagadis Chandra Bose Medal
- Scientific career
- Fields: Enzymology; Parasitology
- Workplaces: Jadavpur University; Indian Institute of Chemical Biology

Amar Nath Bhaduri (12 November 1935 – 6 June 2003) was an Indian molecular enzymologist and chemical biologist, known for his studies on UDP-glucose 4-epimerase, a homodimeric epimerase found in cells and his work on Leishmania donovani, the protozoal pathogen for Kala-azar. He was the director of the Indian Institute of Chemical Biology (IICB), Kolkata and an elected fellow of the Indian National Science Academy and the Indian Academy of Sciences. The Council of Scientific and Industrial Research, the apex agency of the Government of India for scientific research, awarded him the Shanti Swarup Bhatnagar Prize for Science and Technology, one of the highest Indian science awards, in 1978, for his contributions to biological sciences.

== Biography ==
Amar Nath Bhaduri, born on 12 November 1935 at Shyambazar, in northern Kolkata in the Indian state of West Bengal, did his schooling at the Scottish Church Collegiate School before continuing his college studies at Presidency College and the University College of Science, Technology & Agriculture of Calcutta University. Moving to the US, he secured the degree of Doctor of Science from University of Michigan, Ann Arbor in 1964 and after completing his post-doctoral studies at Harvard Medical School, returned to India in 1966 to join the Jadavpur University as a member of faculty of the department of pharmacy. He served the institution till his move to the Indian Institute of Chemical Biology (IICB) in 1985 and superannuated as the director of the institute; in between, he had a short stint at Roche Institute of Molecular Biology during 1975–76. Post his retirement, he continued his association with IICB as an emeritus scientist. He was also serving as an honorary professor at Calcutta and Jadvapur universities when he died on 5 June 2003 at Kolkata, succumbing to age-related illnesses, at the age of 67, survived by his wife, son and daughter. The Indian National Science Academy has documented his life in their Biographical Memoirs.

== Legacy ==
At the University of Michigan, Ann Arbor, Bhaduri was associated with Paul Srere and worked on citrate metabolism and fatty acid biosynthesis. It was during his post-doctoral studies at Harvard Medical School, he elucidated the effect of uridine nucleotides on an epimerase. Later, he continued his researches at Jadavpur University and discovered methodologies for the purification of Glucose-6-phosphate dehydrogenase and for the regulation of UDP-glucose 4-epimerase from S. fragilis. His researches revealed that the enzyme was allosterically activated by metabolically-related sugar phosphates and its allosteric kinetics is uni-directional, a property helpful in the regulation of galactose metabolism. He also proposed a protocol for the desensitization of the enzyme by heat, thereby generating hyperbolic kinetics and demonstrated that the addition and dissociation of Nicotinamide adenine dinucleotide activated or de-activated the enzyme. His work was reported to have widened the understanding about the active sites of the enzyme as well as of the molecular mechanisms of allostericity. He studied the host-parasite interaction of Leishmania donovani, a protozoal pathogen affecting humans, and his work attempted to explain the biomodulatory role for Ca2+ in the life cycle of the parasite. His researches have been published by way of several articles and he mentored many scholars in their doctoral researches.

Bhaduri, who sat in the editorial boards of journals such as the Journal of Biosciences from 1986 to 1992 and the Indian Journal of Biochemistry and Biophysics from 1983 to 1991, was a member of the national organizing committee of the International Union of Biochemistry and Molecular Biology (IUBMB) Congress held in New Delhi in 1994. He served as the project director for the UNDP project on Molecular Biology and Biotechnology of Parasites and presided the biochemistry and biophysics section of the Indian Science Congress held in Kochi in 1990. He was a president of the Institute of Science, Education and Culture (ISEC), Kolkata.

== Awards and honors ==
Bhaduri delivered several award orations including the B. C. Guha Memorial Lecture of the University of Calcutta in 1989. An elected fellow of the Indian National Science Academy (1986) and the Indian Academy of Sciences (1989), he was awarded the Shanti Swarup Bhatnagar Prize, one of the highest Indian science awards, by the Council of Scientific and Industrial Research in 1979. Indian National Science Academy honored him again with Jagadis Chandra Bose Medal in 1995. He has received DSc (Honaris Causa) from Burdwan University in 1995 and his name has been included in the list of 200 illustrious alumni of Presidency University during their Bicentenary celebration.

== See also ==
- UDP-glucose 4-epimerase
- Indian Institute of Chemical Biology
