= North Bengal Medical College and Hospital =

Medical school and hospital in Siliguri, West Bengal, India

- Motto: Latin: Servitium Do Populum
- Motto in English: Serving the Population
- Recognition: NMC; INC
- Type: Public Medical college & Hospital
- Established: November 18, 1968; 57 years ago
- Founder: Bidhan Chandra Roy
- Academic affiliations: West Bengal University of Health Sciences
- Principal: Dr. Sujoy Mistri
- Students: Totals: 250 UG seats (MBBS); 90 PG seats (MD & MS)
- Location: Sushrutanagar, Siliguri, Siliguri Metropolitan Area, West Bengal-734012, India; 26.687°N 88.385°E
- Campus: 161 acres (65 ha); Semi Urban
- Website: nbmch.ac.in

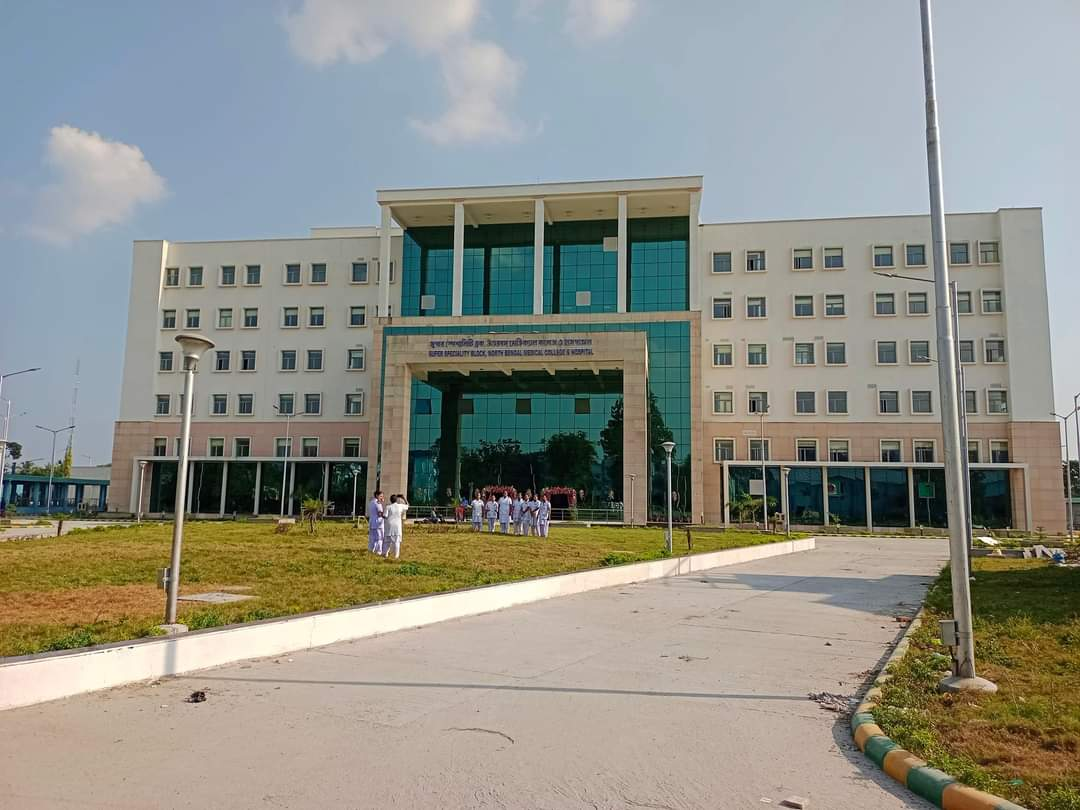
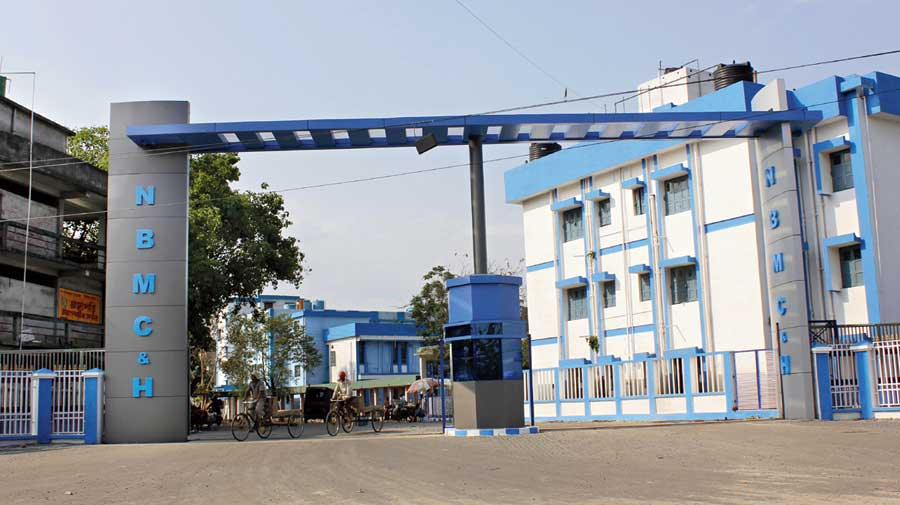
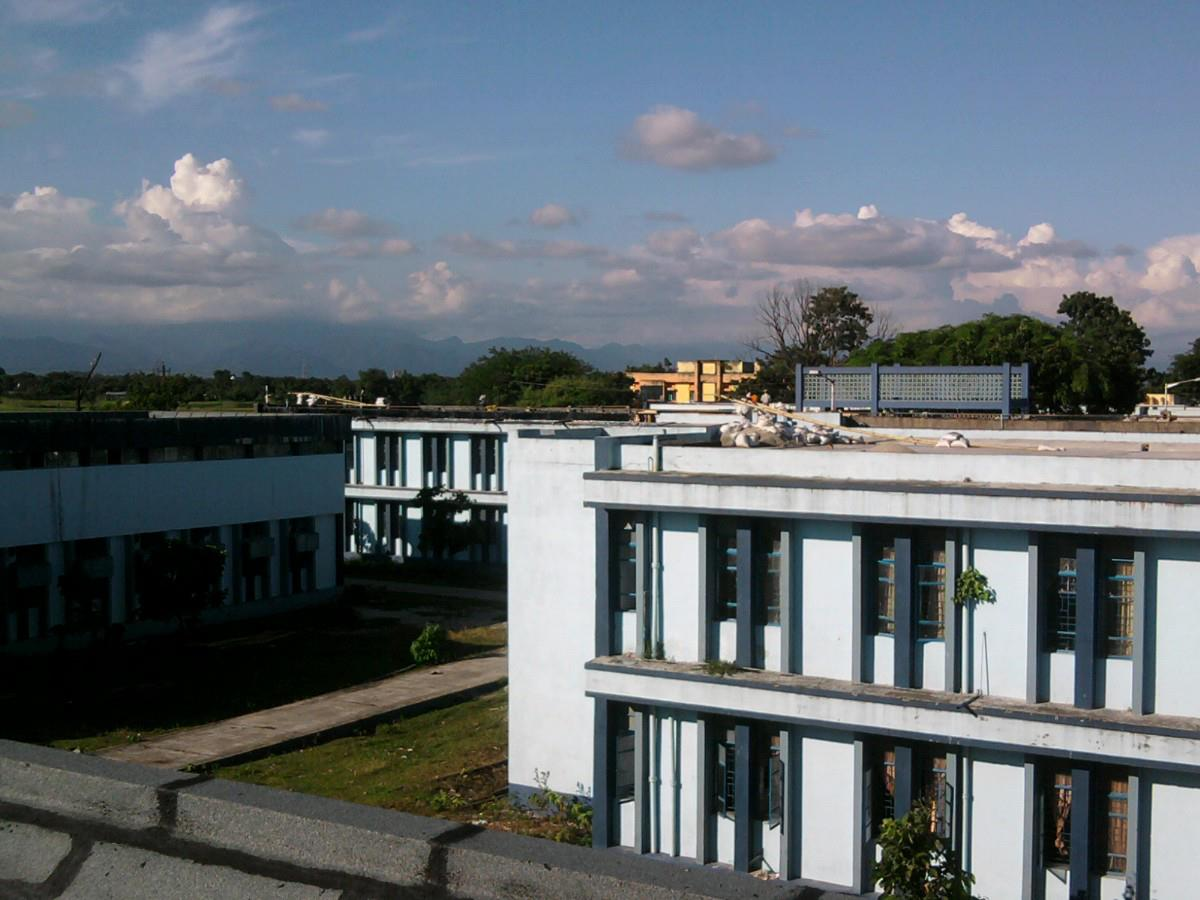
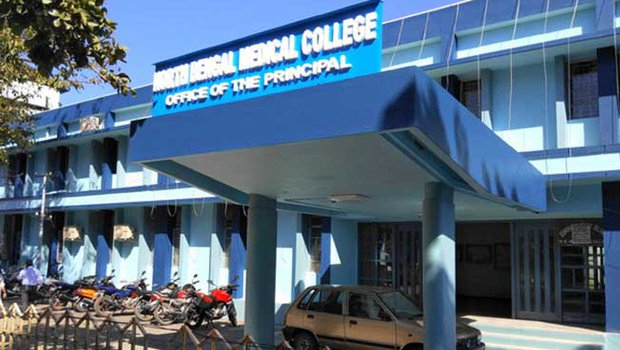

North Bengal Medical College and Hospital (NBMC&H) is a public medical college and hospital in Siliguri, West Bengal, India. Established in 1968, it is the first medical college in the northern region of West Bengal. It is one of the 26 government medical colleges in West Bengal and the largest in terms of area. The hospital has a bed strength of 1,500.

== Latest events ==
In the recent train collision on 17 June 2024, the injured people were brought up to this hospital. The Ministry of Railways announced a compensation of ₹10 lakh (US$12,000) for the dead, ₹2.5 lakh (US$3,000) for those seriously injured and ₹50,000 (US$600) for those with minor injuries.

== History ==
It was established in 1968 as the first medical college of North Bengal. Originally envisioned by Bidhan Chandra Roy, the planning was executed by Ajit Kumar Panja, the then state health minister. Ajit Kumar Duttagupta joined as the first official principal of the college which was then known as North Bengal University Medical College. NBUMC was rechristened in August 1978 to North Bengal Medical College & Hospital and the administrative control went from University of North Bengal to Government of West Bengal and later to West Bengal University of Health Sciences.

=== The first batches ===
The premedical classes started on 6.11.67 in a makeshift arrangement at Jackson medical school, Jalpaiguri. 2nd to 6th batch of students undertook their premedical course at Raigunj University College. 7th batch onwards, the students started their premedical course at NBMC campus, Sushrutanagar, their own place.

Classes for 1st-year MBBS course for 1st batch started on 18.11.68 in NBU campus. MBBS classes started in Sushrutanagar, the present site of NBMC in 1972. The first 5 batches had to migrate to SSKM hospital for their clinical lessons after passing 2nd prof. First 2 batches completed internship and housemanship there. The college got its recognition from the Medical Council of India in 1978.

=== Introduction of postgraduation courses ===
In 2004, the institute achieved the milestone to be reckoned as the Post-graduate institute with introduction of MD/MS courses in five specialised disciplines like Anatomy, Physiology, Community Medicine, Pathology and Anesthesiology, which were recognized by the Medical Council of India in 2007. Since then more postgraduate courses were added in the fields of Forensic Medicine & Toxicology, General Medicine, General Surgery, Gynaecology & Obstetrics, Orthopaedics, Paediatrics, Ophthalmology, Radiodiagnosis, Psychiatry, Otorhinolaryngology and other subjects.

=== Increase of undergraduate seats ===
From 2013 onwards Undergraduate seats had been increased by 50, which made the annual undergraduate students intake to 150 but from the year 2017 the newly added 50 seats were slashed by the MCI on grounds of lack of infrastructure but again in the year 2018, intake was increased to 150. From 2019 intake was again increased to 200 (EWS Scheme).

== Campus ==
North Bengal Medical College & Hospital is located in Sushrutanagar, locally known as Noukaghat, to the west of Siliguri, connected to the town by the 3rd Mahananda bridge. Sushrutanagar, Darjeeling (situated at Thiknikata Gram Panchayet), otherwise referred to as 'medical' by the local people, is more or less 5 km from proper Siliguri. The nearest Railway Station is New Jalpaiguri Junction about 11 km away and the nearest Airport is Bagdogra International Airport about 9 km from the Campus.

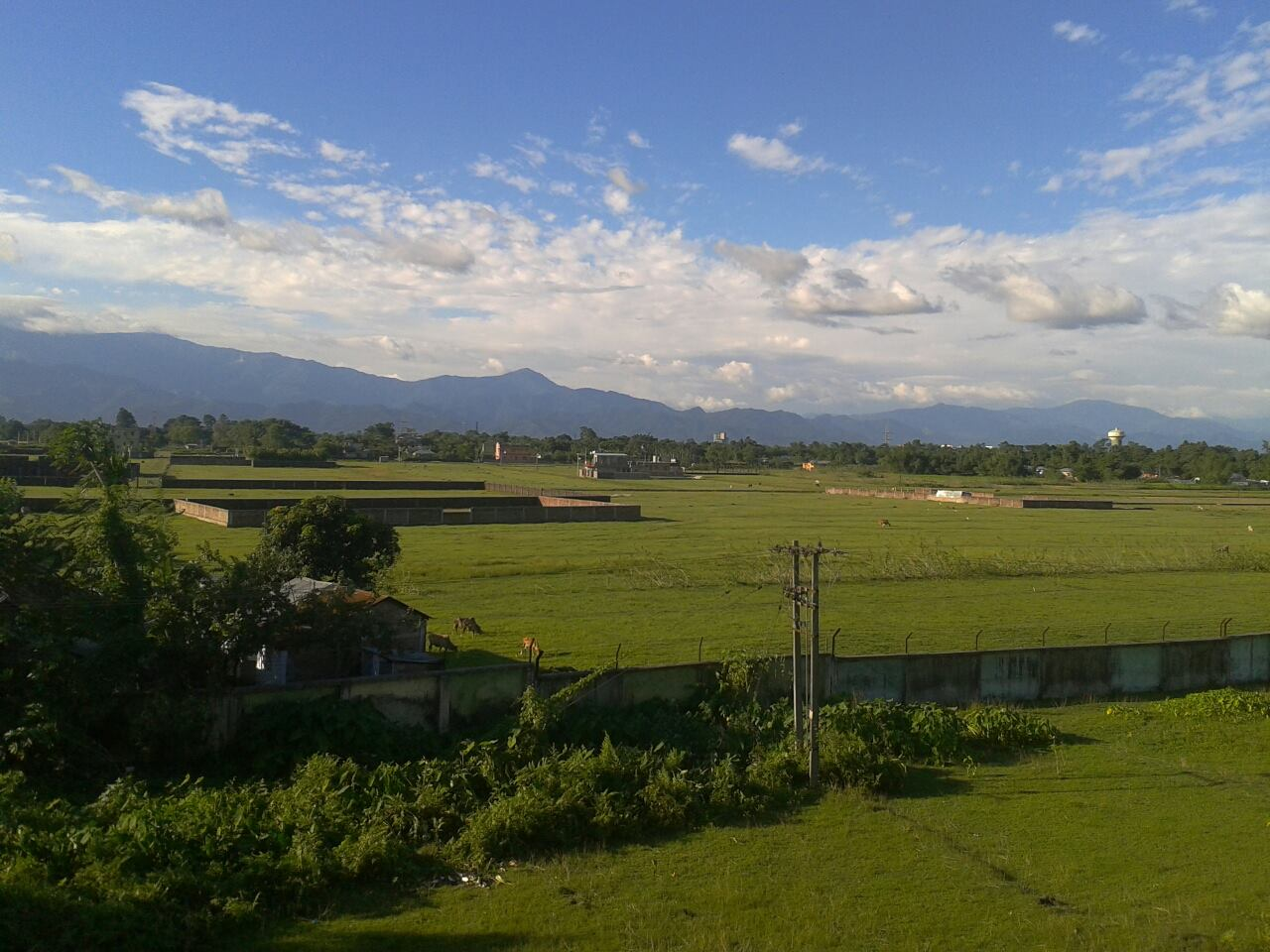
View from JBH UTTARAN Interiors of Uttaran

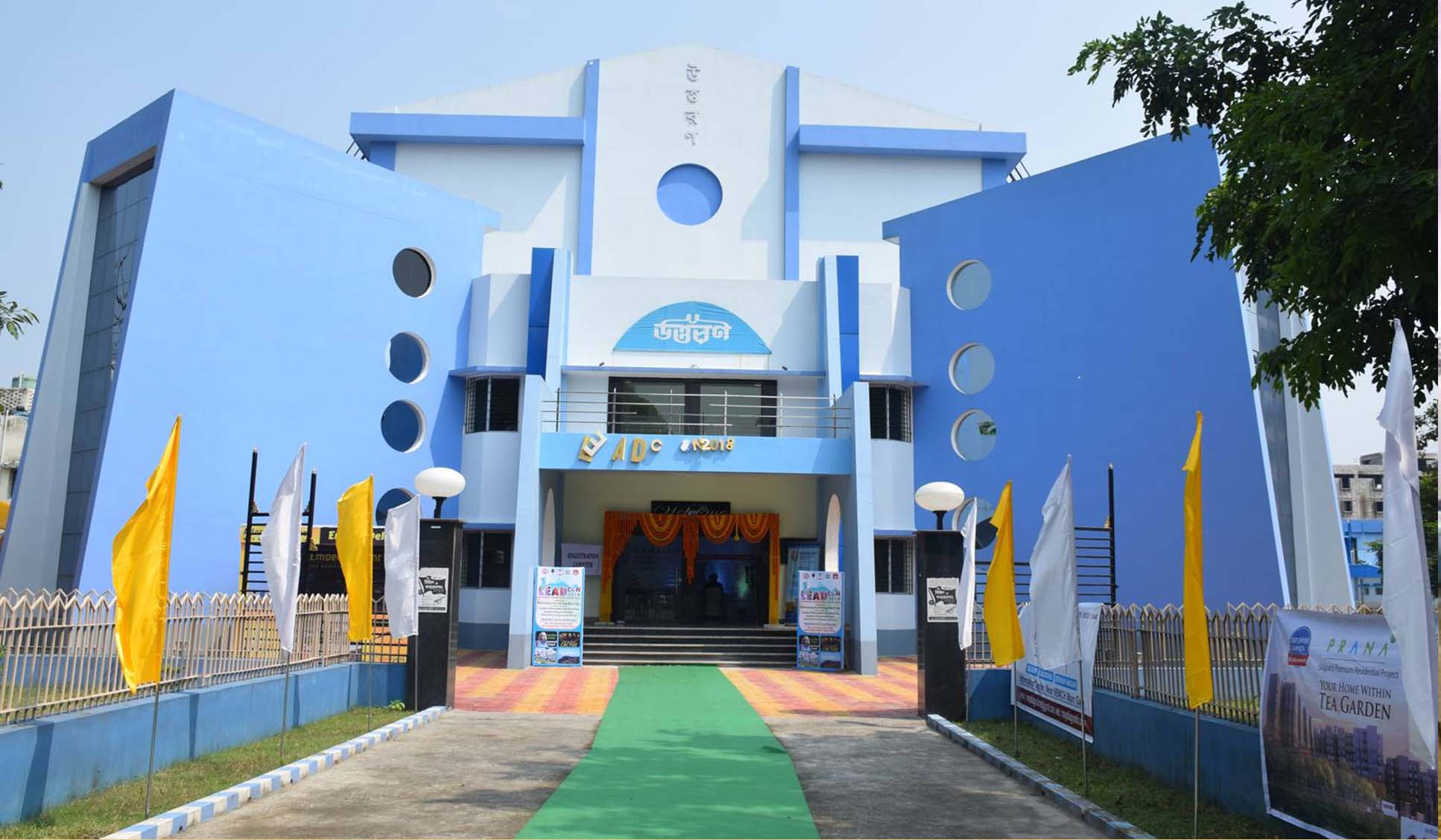
The Auditorium of NBMCH, Uttaran

The college and hospital buildings, spread over a sprawling campus of 161 acres (0.65 km^{2}), are connected by very long corridors which total a length of 2.6 km. The North Bengal Dental College and the Nursing Training College are also located in the same campus.

In 2021, the hospital established the Virus Research & Diagnostic Laboratory (VRDL), which has been instrumental in testing for respiratory viruses, including during the COVID-19 pandemic. By 2022, the hospital expanded its testing capabilities to include 21 different viruses, further strengthening its role in managing infectious diseases. In 2023, NBMCH planned to start adenovirus testing, capable of testing at least 50 samples per day from all North Bengal districts.

== Organisation and administration ==
=== Governance ===
The college and hospital are funded and managed by the Government of West Bengal.

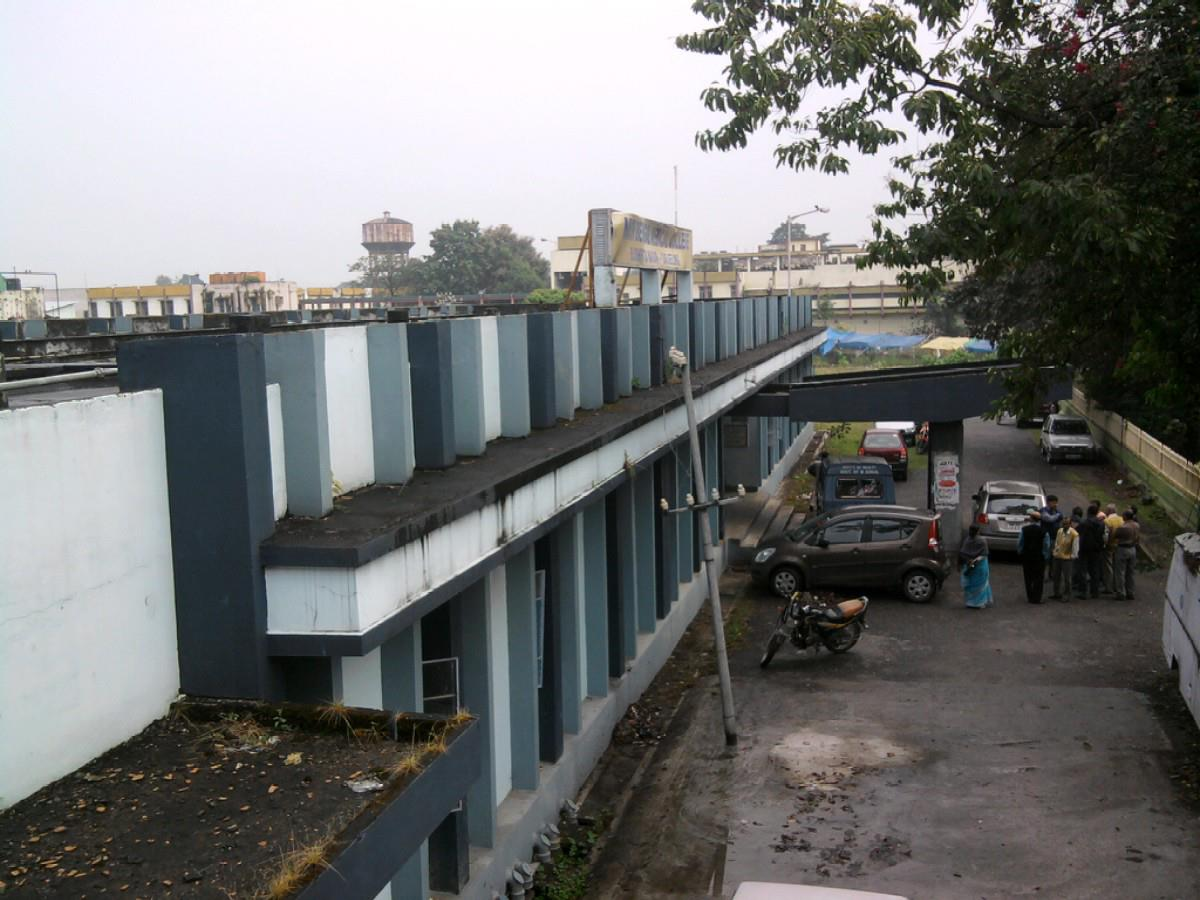
Academic Block (AD Block) in 2011

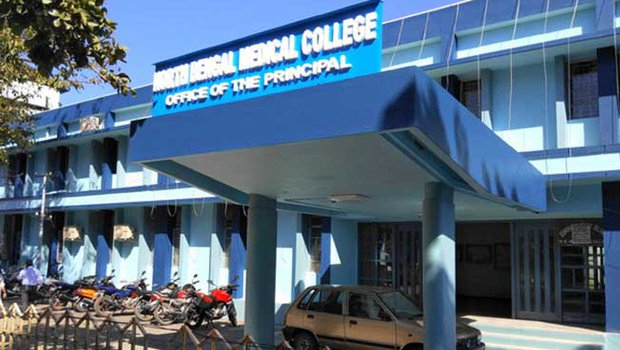
Academic Block after extension in 2017

=== Principals ===
- A. K. Dutta Gupta (09.11.1970 to 30.11.1973)
- S. C. Laha (01.12.1973 to 11.07.1974)
- L. K. Ganguli (12.07.1974 to 31.03.1978)
- J. N. Bhadury (01.04.1978 to 03.03.1981)
- S. K. Biswas (04.03.1981 to 21.10.1982)
- A. K. Ram (22.10.1982 to 21.03.1983)
- J. N. Bhadury (22.03.1983 to 10.12.1985)
- A. Nandy (11.12.1985 to 14.08.1985)
- P. K. Gupta (15.08.1986 to 31.03.1987)
- S. P. Banerjee (02.04.1987 to 04.08.1988)
- G. K. Das (05.08.1988 to 10.11.1992)
- P. K. Mukherjee (11.11.1992 to 04.05.1995)
- A. K. Kar (04.05.1995 to 14.06.1995)
- S. K. Basu (14.06.1995 to 25.03.1998)
- B. Sarkar (25.03.1998 to 27.10.1999)
- Dipti Basu (27.10.1999 to 07.09.2001)
- Udayan Ganguly (07.09.2001 to 06.09.2002)
- Utpal Kumar Datta (06.09.2002 to 31.03.2004)
- Sangita Bhattacharyya (31.03.2004 to 31.03.2006)
- J. B. Saha (31.03.2006 to 28.07.2006)
- Udayan Ganguly (28.07.2006 to 21.08.2009)
- J. B. Saha (21.08.2009 to 17.01.2011)
- T. K. Bhattacharya (17.01.2011 to 30.06.2011)
- Anup Kr. Roy (04.07.2011 to 2015)
- Samir Ghosh Roy (2015 to 2018)
- Gen. P. K. Deb (2018 to 2021)
- Indrajit Saha (2021 to 2024)
- Sanjay Kumar Mallick (2024 to 21.07.2026)
- Sujoy Mistri (22.07.2026–present)

== Academics ==
=== Affiliation ===
The college was affiliated to the University of North Bengal since its inception. Starting from the 2003 admission batch, it is formally affiliated to the newly formed West Bengal University of Health Sciences.

=== Admission ===
Entrance to the college for MBBS is on the basis of ranks achieved by the student in National Eligibility cum Entrance Test (Undergraduate) conducted by the NTA, as is the case with nearly all other medical colleges in the country by a Supreme Court order.

For postgraduate courses, one has to clear the National Eligibility cum Entrance Test (Postgraduate).

=== Academic programmes ===
The courses offered are:

==== Undergraduate courses ====
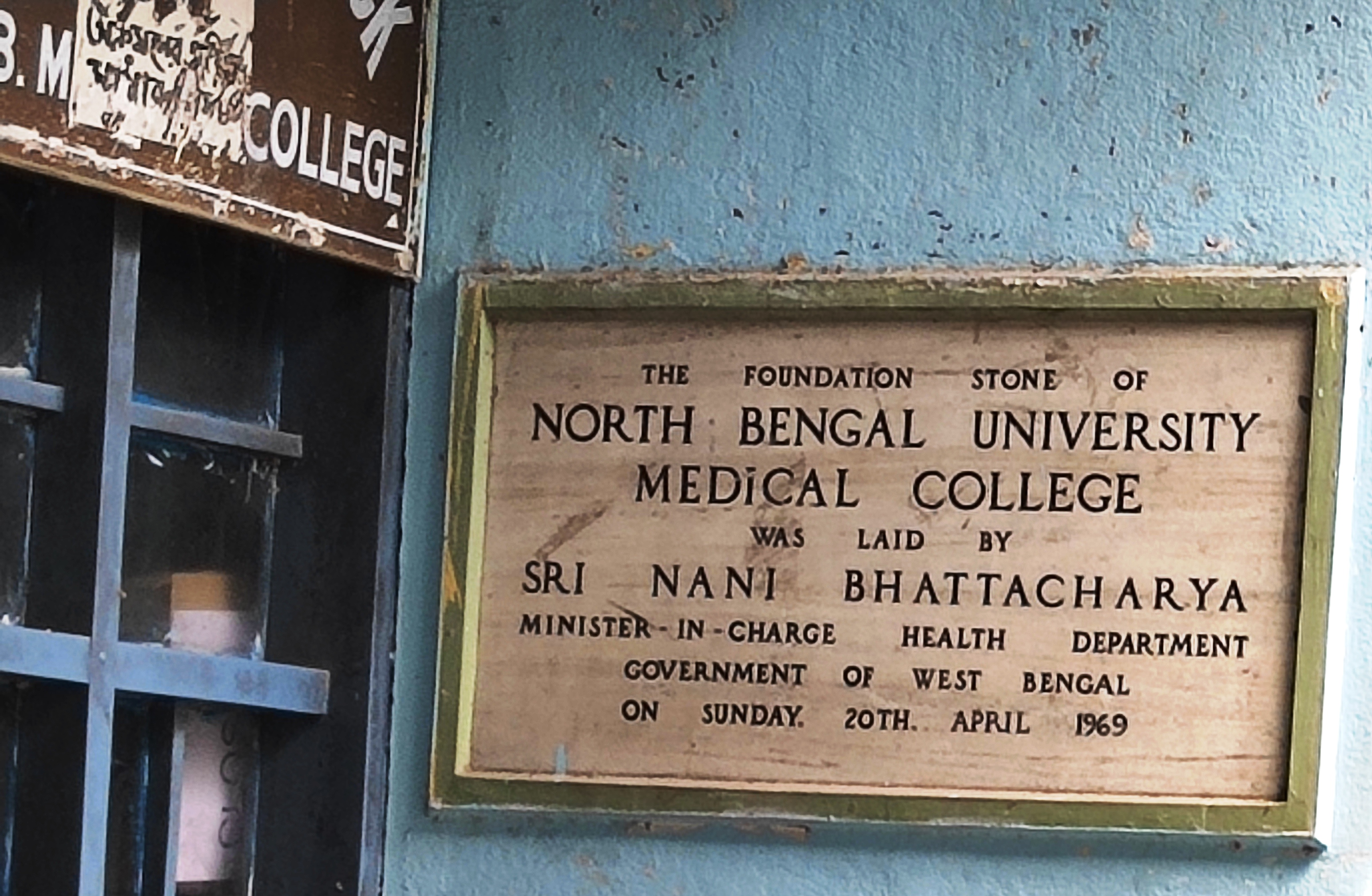
Foundation Stone of North Bengal University Medical College

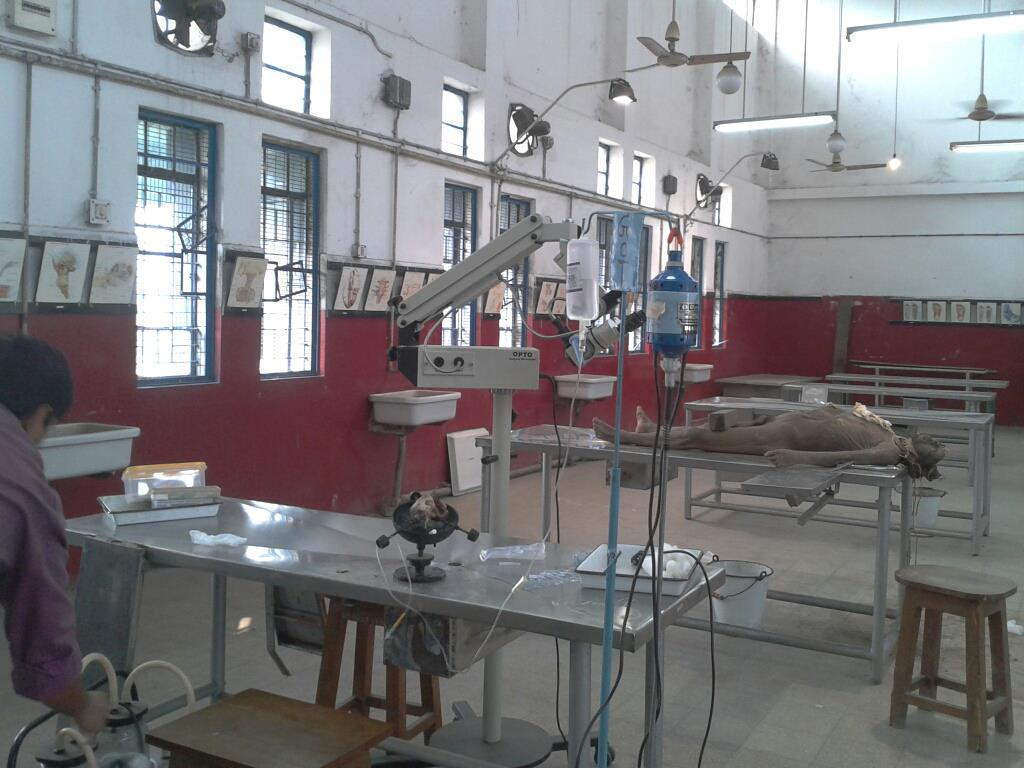
Anatomy Dissection Hall

- M.B.B.S. (Annual intake of 250 students)
- B.Sc. in Nursing
- GNM Nursing
- ANM Nursing

==== Post-graduate courses ====
- MD Anaesthesiology (11 seats)
- MD Biochemistry (4 seats)
- MD Community Medicine (3 seats)
- MD Forensic Medicine and Toxicology (2 seats)
- MD General Medicine (18 seats)
- MD Paediatrics (4 seats)
- MD Pathology (7 seats)
- MD Physiology (4 seats)
- MD Psychiatry (2 seats)
- MD Radiodiagnosis (6 seats)
- MS Anatomy (4 seats)
- MS Gynaecology and Obstetrics (9 seats)
- MS Ophthalmology (2 seats)
- MS Orthopaedics (2 seats)
- MS Oto-rhino-laryngology (2 seats)
- MS General Surgery (6 seats)
- M.Sc Nursing

==== Research level (super-specialization) ====
- Nephrology
- Cardiology
- Neurology
- Rheumatology
- Plastic and Reconstructive Surgery
- Pediatric Surgery
- Neurosurgery
- Cardiothoracic and Vascular Surgery
- Oral and Maxillofacial Surgery
- Selected by ICMR-NICED for establishment of Model Rural Health Research Unit (MRHRU).

==== Paramedical and Technologist under State Medical Faculty of West Bengal ====
- D.M.L.T. - Diploma in Medical Lab Technology
- D.P.T. - Diploma in Physical Medicine
- D. Dial - Diploma in Dialysis
- D.R.D. - Diploma in Radiology
- D.C.C.T. - Diploma in Critical Care Technology

=== Conferences and workshops ===
The college hosts numerous Undergraduate & Postgraduate Conferences throughout the year. Notable Conferences hosted/will be hosted by the institution includes-

- NUMESCON- It is the national undergraduate medical students' conference of North Bengal Medical College held in the month of March. The conference has hands-on workshops, sessions by eminent speakers of the medical fraternity and various other interactive events.

The First Numescon was in 2015 and saw participation from all over India as well as neighbouring countries as Bangladesh.

- Embarkon – an annual intra-college Undergraduate conference & workshop

== Hospital services ==
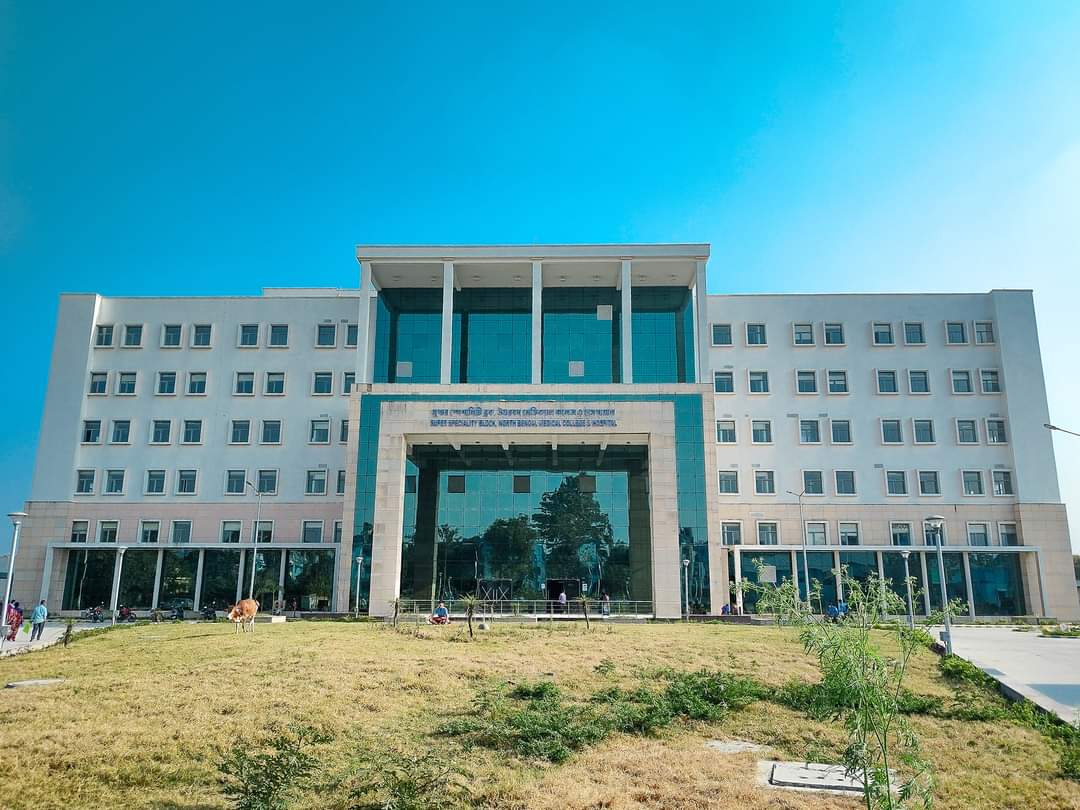
Super speciality Block of NBMCH

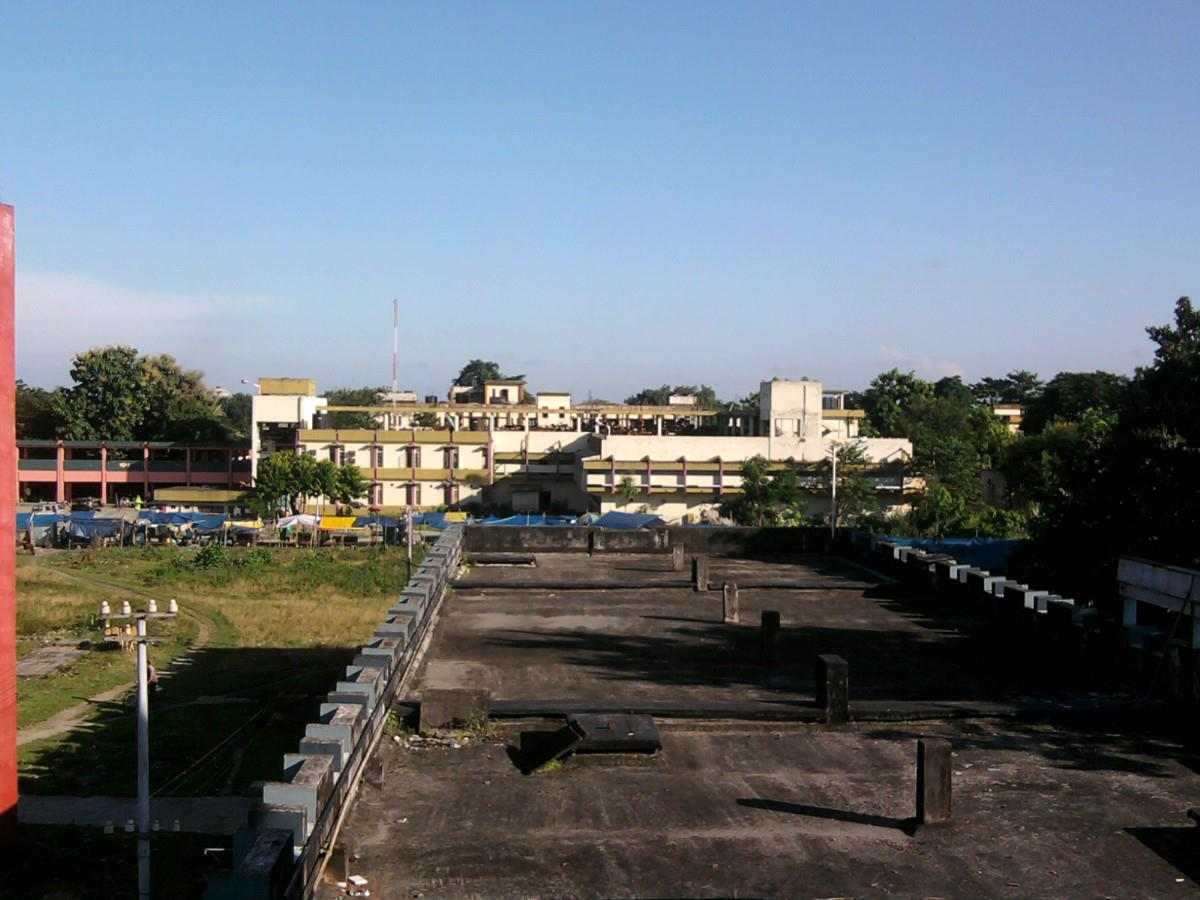
Hospital Campus

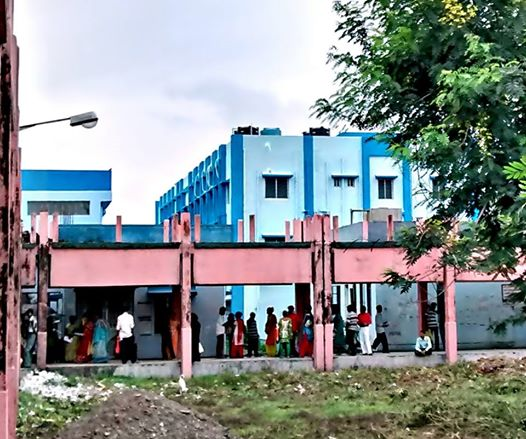
View of Trauma Care Facility (Level II) from OPD ticket Counter

- Emergency
- Outdoor services
- Indoor services
- Regional Blood Transfusion Centre (RBTC)
- Hybrid Critical Care Unit (HDU+CCU)
- Surgical Intensive Care Unit (SICU)
- Intensive Coronary Care Unit (ICCU)
- Neonatal Intensive Care Unit (NICU)
- Paediatric Intensive Care Unit (PICU)
- Sick Neonatal Intensive Care Unit (SNCU)
- Trauma Care Facility (Level II)
- A.R.T Centre
- V.C.T.C
- V.R.D.L
- Preventive Cardiology
- Tele-Medicine
- Counselling
- Diagnostic & Investigation
- Fair Price Medicine Shop
- Intermediate State Reference Laboratory for Multi Drug Resistance-TB
- Physiotherapy and Rehabilitation centre (under PMR department)
- Pain Clinic (under PMR department)
- Super speciality Block

Selected under MoHFW PMSSY scheme (phase III) for super Speciality care (along with Medical College Kolkata, Bankura Sammilani Medical College & Malda Medical College) which would include 255 beds for super speciality care in neurosurgery, CTVS, Plastic surgery and Burn, Paediatric Surgery, Cardiology, Neurology and so forth.

== Student life ==
=== Demography ===
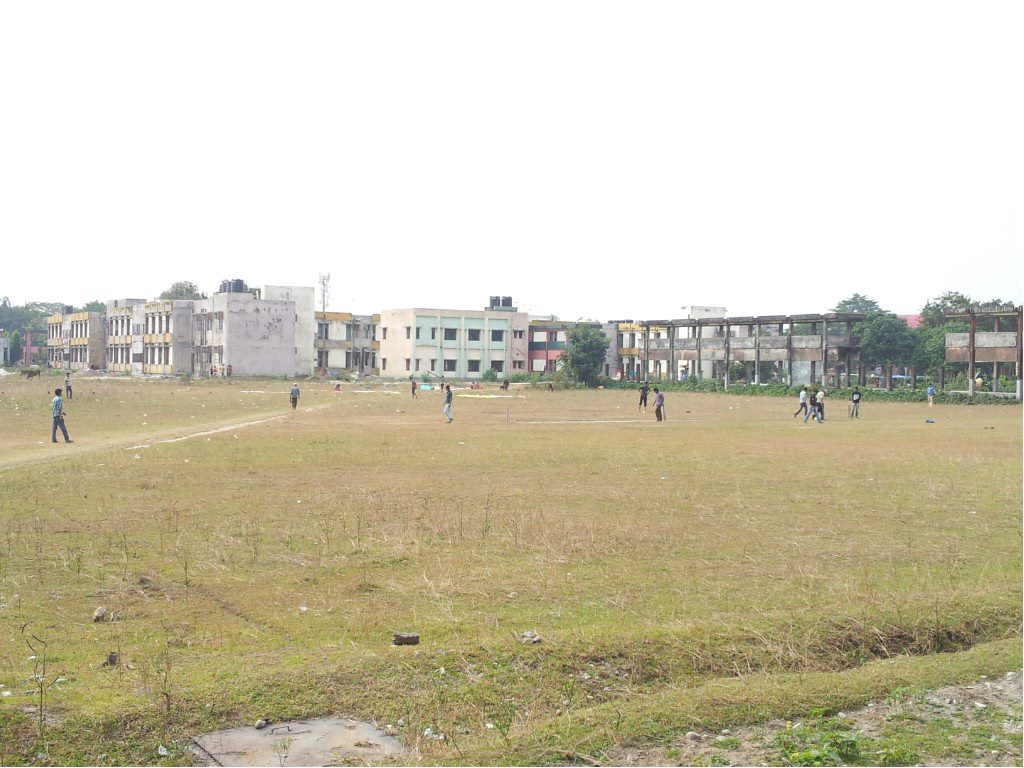
Playground behind Medicine Dept

Every year 200 (Initially it was started with 50 seats, increased to 100 then 150; 50 more seats increased from 2019) students graduate from the college. Besides, there are postgraduate students in various streams. Most students are from outside Siliguri and stay in the campus hostels. From the 2013 to 2014 session, it has been decided to increase the number of undergraduate (MBBS) seats by 50.

=== Hostels ===
==== Boys ====
- J.B.H. (Junior Boys Hostel) - for 1st year and 2nd-year students. (4 storied)
- N.B.H. (A.K Dutta Memorial Hostel) - for 3rd year and 4th-year students. (4 storied)
- S.B.H. (Senior Boys Hostel) - for final year students and interns
- Intern Hostel - for House staffs and Internees. The postgraduate trainees are also accommodated in the same hostel. (Near the Emergency Gate)
- P.G Boys Hostel- for post graduate students.

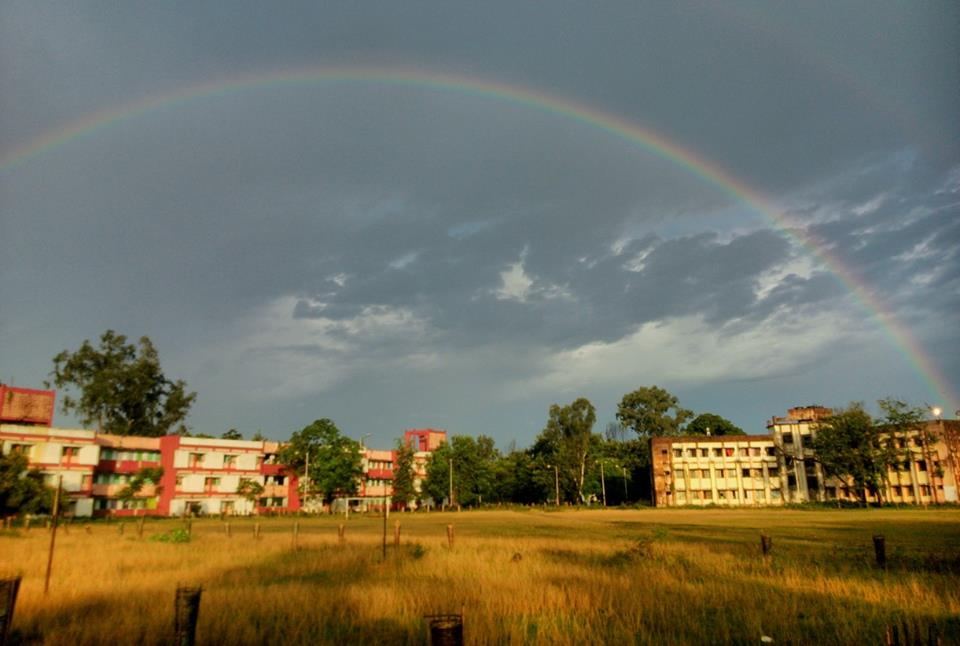
Rainbow over NBH & SBH

==== Girls ====
- L.H. (Ladies Hostel) - 2nd year and 3rd-year students and house staffs.
- K.G.H (Kadambini Ganguly memorial Girl's Hostel) - for 4th year, final year students, interns and house staffs.
- N.G.H. (New Girls Hostel) - for 1st-year students.
- P.G Girls hostel - for post graduate students.

=== Associations ===
- NBMC ex-students association

=== Cultural programmes ===
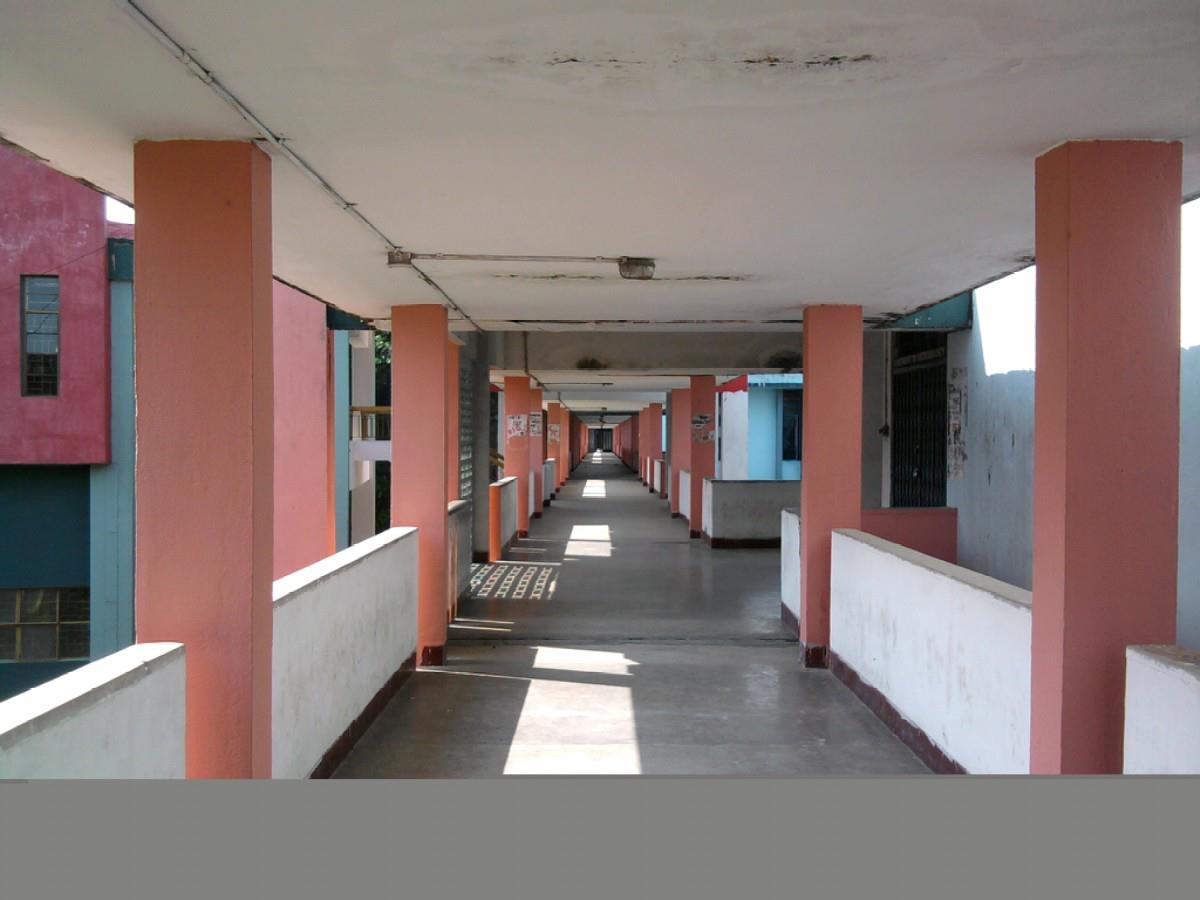
Corridors of NBMC

- The annual inter-college fest Plasma spanning 4 days is held in the month of September. It is a big event with noted artists performing and students displaying their creative fervour. Other than NBMC students, Plasma also sees active participation by students from nearby colleges like North Bengal Dental College, Siliguri Institute of Technology, North Bengal University, Jalpaiguri Government Engineering College.
- Ujan (উজান) - This is a popular Cultural Forum formed by the Medical, Dental and Paramedical students of this institution. "নবচেতনা"(Nabachetana) is the official magazine of Ujan.
- Students also celebrate Martyrs' day of Saheed-e-Azam Bhagat Singh, Mastarda Surya Sen, Khudiram Bose and birthday of Netaji, Norman Bethune every year.
- The ex-students re-union Nostalgia is held in the post weekend of 18 November o every year for two days in a row.
- The freshers' welcome takes place every year to greet the new batch of MBBS students.
- Students celebrate Saraswati Puja every year in traditional style.
- Rabindra Jayanti is another annual event marking the birthday anniversary of Rabindranath Tagore.
- The college Foundation Day is observed every year on 18 November.
- College also organises Grand Iftar, during Ramadan.
- Students also celebrates Kali Puja, During Diwali, Which is a unique event.

The college students have formed their own bands. Umami, Whistling Woods, Intoxication, Doctors Chamber, Bipolar and Phonation are the most famous in the campus. 2017, the Golden Jubilee year Plasma, was celebrated with the welcome of eminent band like Fossils.

== See also ==
- List of institutions of higher education in West Bengal
