= Indian Institute of Chemical Biology =

Biomedical research centre in Kolkata, West Bengal

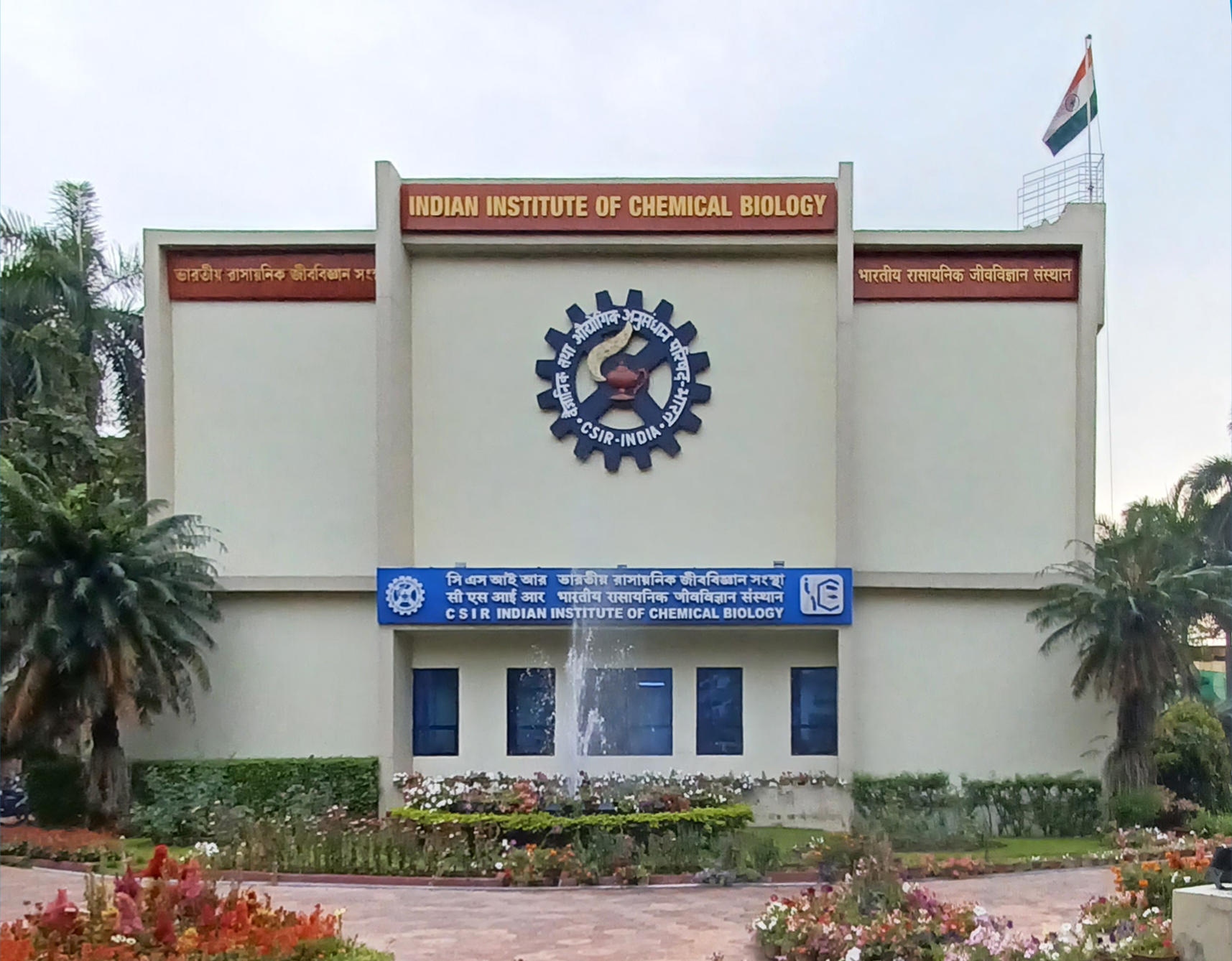
- Nickname: IICB, Kolkata
- Established: c. 1935; 91 years ago
- Laboratory type: Research and development
- Research type: Multidisciplinary Medical research
- Field of research: Cancer Biology; Inflammatory disorder; Cell biology; Physiology; Infectious Diseases; Immunology; Molecular genetics; Organic chemistry; Medicinal chemistry; Structural biology; Bioinformatics
- Director: Vibha Tandon
- Location: Kolkata, West Bengal, India; 22°29′51″N 88°22′12″E
- Campus: Large city
- Affiliations: AcSIR
- Operating agency: Council of Scientific & Industrial Research
- Website: iicb.res.in

Indian Institute of Chemical Biology (IICB) is a biomedical research centre in Kolkata, West Bengal, India.

Established in 1935 as Indian Institute of Experimental Medicine (IIEM), it was inducted under the aegis of the Council of Scientific & Industrial Research (CSIR) in 1956 and renamed to its present form in 1982. It has 6 R&D divisions:- Cancer Biology & Inflammatory Disorder, Cell Biology & Physiology, Chemistry, Infectious Diseases & Immunology, Molecular & Human Genetics, and Structural Biology & Bioinformatics.

== Notable people ==
- Amar Bhaduri, Director of CSIR-IICB, Kolkata (1990-1995) and President of Society of Biological Chemists of India (1999-2000), known for outstanding contribution in Kala-azar research in India.
- Santasabuj Das, Director of NIRBI
