= Santasabuj Das =

Indian medical doctor and immunologist

- Born: 23 June 1968 (age 58); West Bengal, India
- Education: University of Calcutta; Indian Institute of Chemical Biology; Sanjay Gandhi Postgraduate Institute of Medical Sciences; Thomas Jefferson University; Tufts Medical Center
- Known for: Studies on human Salmonella infections
- Awards: N-BIOS Prize (2011)
- Scientific career
- Fields: Immunology; Bioinformatics
- Workplaces: National Institute for Research in Bacterial Infections

Santasabuj Das is an Indian medical doctor, molecular immunologist, bioinformatician, scientist and the current Director of the National Institute for Research in Bacterial Infections, Kolkata. He is known for his studies on the pathogenesis of various types of infections caused by Salmonella in humans and is an elected fellow of the West Bengal Academy of Science and Technology. He is a former Fulbright scholar and a life member of the Probiotic Association of India, the Society of Biological Chemists, India and the Indian Science Congress Association. The Department of Biotechnology of the Government of India awarded him the National Bioscience Award for Career Development, one of the highest Indian science awards, for his contributions to biosciences, in 2011.

== Biography ==
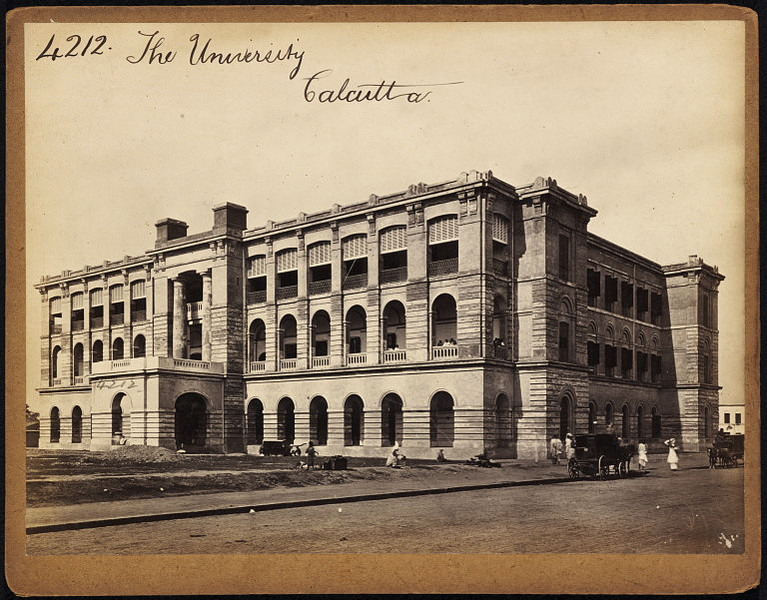
Calcutta University - a Francis Frith image

Born in the Indian state of West Bengal, Santasabuj Das did his medical studies at the University of Calcutta from where he earned an MBBS in 1990 and an MD in 1996. He started his career as a research associate at the division of cellular immunology of the Indian Institute of Chemical Biology but moved to complete his residency at the Sanjay Gandhi Postgraduate Institute of Medical Sciences. Subsequently, he served as a post-doctoral fellow at the National Center for Biological Sciences from 1998 and in 2000, he moved to the US to work as a post doctoral fellow at the Kimmel Cancer Center of the Thomas Jefferson University. In 2002, he joined the Molecular Oncology Research Institute of the Tufts Medical Center as a post-doctoral research associate where he stayed until 2004. On his return to India, he joined the National Institute for Research in Bacterial Infections in Kolkata as a grade C scientist in 2005 and holds the positions of a grade E scientist and assistant director. He has also been serving as a senior scientist of the Indian Council of Medical Research since 2013. In 2025, he was appointed as the director of NIRBI.

== Professional profile ==
Das' research focus is on the various types of infections caused by Salmonella in humans and he has done studies in the fields of pathogenesis of Salmonella Typhi and vaccine development against the pathogen. He holds two international and one national patent for the processes he has developed. His studies have been documented by way of a number of articles (Note: Please see Selected bibliography section) and through chapters contributed to books published by others. He is the coordinator for the Biomedical Informatics Centre of the National Institute for Research in Bacterial Infections, and is a life member of the Society of Biological Chemists, India, the Indian Science Congress Association and the Probiotic Association of India.

== Awards and honors ==
The Department of Biotechnology (DBT) of the Government of India awarded him the National Bioscience Award for Career Development, one of the highest Indian science awards in 2011. The Bureau of Educational and Cultural Affairs (ECA) of the United States Department of State selected him for the Fulbright scholarship in 2012. The West Bengal Academy of Science and Technology elected him as a fellow in 2016.

== Selected bibliography ==
=== Chapters ===
- Gunjan Arora; Andaleeb Sajid; Vipin Chandra Kalia (21 March 2017). Drug Resistance in Bacteria, Fungi, Malaria, and Cancer. Springer. pp. 577–. ISBN 978-3-319-48683-3.

=== Articles ===
- Thakur, Bhupesh Kumar; Dasgupta, Nirmalya; Ta, Atri; Das, Santasabuj (8 July 2016). "Physiological TLR5 expression in the intestine is regulated by differential DNA binding of Sp1/Sp3 through simultaneous Sp1 dephosphorylation and Sp3 phosphorylation by two different PKC isoforms". Nucleic Acids Research. 44 (12): 5658–5672. doi:10.1093/nar/gkw189. ISSN 0305-1048. PMC 4937308. PMID 27060138.
- Theeya, Nagaraja; Ta, Atri; Das, Sayan; Mandal, Rahul S.; Chakrabarti, Oishee; Chakrabarti, Saikat; Ghosh, Amar N.; Das, Santasabuj (1 February 2015). "An Inducible and Secreted Eukaryote-Like Serine/Threonine Kinase of Salmonella enterica Serovar Typhi Promotes Intracellular Survival and Pathogenesis". Infection and Immunity. 83 (2): 522–533. doi:10.1128/iai.02521-14. ISSN 0019-9567. PMC 4294231. PMID 25404028.
- Ghosh, Shubhamoy; Chakraborty, Krishnendu; Nagaraja, Theeya; Basak, Surajit; Koley, Hemanta; Dutta, Shanta; Mitra, Utpala; Das, Santasabuj (22 February 2011). "An adhesion protein of Salmonella enterica serovar Typhi is required for pathogenesis and potential target for vaccine development". Proceedings of the National Academy of Sciences. 108 (8): 3348–3353. Bibcode:2011PNAS..108.3348G. doi:10.1073/pnas.1016180108. PMC 3044360. PMID 21300870.

== See also ==
- TLR5
- Eukaryote
