= National Institute for Research in Bacterial Infections =

Medical Research Institute in Kolkata, India

- Former name: National Institute of Cholera and Enteric Diseases (NICED)
- Established: c. 1962; 64 years ago
- Research type: Medical research
- Field of research: Diarrheal diseases; Intestinal infectious diseases; HIV/AIDS research; Antimicrobial resistance
- Director: Santasabuj Das
- Location: Kolkata, West Bengal, India; 22°33′53.51″N 88°23′49.18″E
- Campus: P-33, CIT Road, Subhas Sarobar Park, Phoolbagan, Beliaghata
- Nickname: NIRBI
- Affiliations: AcSIR
- Operating agency: Indian Council of Medical Research
- Website: nirbi.org.in

National Institute for Research in Bacterial Infections or NIRBI (also known as ICMR-NIRBI) previously known as National Institute of Cholera and Enteric Diseases is an Indian medical institute that conducts research and develops prevention and treatment and control strategies related to enteric diseases and HIV/AIDS. The headquarter of NIRBI is located at Kolkata, West Bengal. NIRBI is affiliated to Academy of Scientific and Innovative Research and financed by Indian Council of Medical Research.

== History ==
Eastern India and the Gangetic Plain have had a long history of cholera and related epidemics. Indian Council of Medical Research (ICMR) set up a cholera research centre at Kyd Street, Kolkata, West Bengal. The aim of establishing this centre was to conduct research related to cholera and other enteric diseases. In 1979, the cholera research centre was renamed to National Institute of Cholera and Enteric Diseases (NICED). In 1980 the institute received the World Health Organization's recognition as "WHO Collaborative Centre for Research and Training on Diarrhoeal Diseases".

The state-of-the-art viral diagnostic and research laboratory (VRDL) at ICMR-NIRBI is established under the VRDL network by the Department of Health Research, Ministry of Health & Family Welfare, Government of India. It was set up as part of the scheme "Establishment of a Network of Laboratories for Managing Epidemics and Natural Calamities" to enhance the infrastructure for viral diagnostics across the country. The laboratory became operational in July 2015.

In 2019, ICMR-NICED established the first National Antimicrobial Resistance Hub in India, funded by ICMR, reflecting its expanded role in addressing contemporary health challenges.

During the COVID-19 pandemic in India (2020), NICED and their microbiologists and researchers played an important role. According to a news article published in The New Indian Express in April 2020, the scientists were working round the clock in shifts.

In 2022 the institute planned open to a rural health research unit in North Bengal Medical College and Hospital. Around ₹ 4 crore will be spent on the infrastructure. For the unit, an MoU has been signed between NBMCH and ICMR, detection of acute encephalitis syndrome, alcoholic liver diseases, skin diseases found in tea gardens, diaorrhea and other localised diseases can be done faster. It will help in early intervention and treatment.

In early 2026, a mobile BSL-3 laboratory was established at ICMR-NIRBI in Beliaghata, Kolkata. Deployed by NIV Pune following Nipah cases in Barasat, this facility enables onsite RT-PCR confirmation, significantly accelerating diagnostic timelines and strengthening regional viral surveillance.

== Organisation and administration ==
Divisions:

- Bacteriology
- Biochemistry
- Bioinformatics
- Clinical Medicine
- Data Management
- Electron Microscopy
- Epidemiology
- Immunology
- Parasitology
- Pathophysiology
- Training & Extension
- Virology
- ICMR-NICED Virus Laboratory

== Academic collaborations ==
In January 2024, Okayama University renewed its MoU with (NICED), now known as ICMR-National Institute for Research in Bacterial Infections (ICMR-NIRBI) for collaborative research in infectious diseases.

== Recognition ==
In 1968 the institute was given the status of "International Reference Centre for Vibrio Phage Typing" by the World Health Organization (WHO). In 1980 the institute received the recognition as "WHO Collaborative Centre for Research and Training on Diarrhoeal Diseases".

NICED (now ICMR-NIRBI) has developed a Shigella vaccine, licensed in 2019, but human trials are pending, with potential availability by 2026 if successful.

== Notable alumni ==
- Kausik Chattopadhyay, is an Indian structural biologist, Protein biologist
