= Viral Research and Diagnostic Laboratories =

Indian virology research centers

The Viral Research and Diagnostic Laboratories (VRDL) scheme was introduced by the Government of India under Department of Health Research - Indian Council of Medical Research as outbreaks of viral agents is very common in India. The Central government announced the establishment of 166 research and diagnostics laboratories in 2016. By 2019, 103 new VRDLs were established across India, taking the total count to 105.

== History ==
There were only two apex testing laboratories in India; National Institute of Virology, Pune and National Centre for Disease Control, New Delhi. These undertook the heavy burden investigations resulting in delay of diagnosis of diseases. In order to strengthen the infrastructure for timely diagnosis of viral epidemics and continuous monitoring of existing as well as new viral strains, new diagnostic centres and institutions were sorely needed.

In 2016, the Central government decided to set up 160 virus testing laboratories across the country. These laboratories will also be equipped to handle cases of bio-terrorism.

The Department of health research of the Ministry of Health and Family Welfare is setting up a three-tier national network of Viral Research and Diagnostic Laboratories (VRDLs). The network is being set up under the department's ongoing research scheme called the Establishment of Network of Laboratories for Managing Epidemics and Natural Calamities.

== Objectives of the scheme ==
1. Creating infrastructures for timely identification of viruses and other agents causing morbidity significant at public health level and specifically agents causing epidemics and/or potential agents for bioterrorism.
2. Developing capacity for identification of novel and unknown viruses and other organisms and emerging-reemerging viral strains and develop diagnostic kits.
3. Providing training to health professionals.
4. Undertaking research for identification of emerging and newer genetically active/ modified agents.

== Evaluation of work ==
The various activities of the Virology Labs will be regularly monitored and guided by the Evaluation Committee, whose findings will be reported to the DHR for information/further action.

The major monitorable targets/ indicators that will be used to review the various categories of Virology Lab.

The scheme has turned out to be hugely successful. As against two VRDL labs in whole of India till 2016; there are now 105 VRDLs operating in India. This expansion is relevant in the context of emerging viral infections and their potential to spread across regions and countries.

== Labs ==
=== Functional VRDLs testing for COVID-19 ===
There are 62 functional VRDL laboratories across the country capable of testing for the COVID-19 virus as of March 17.

Lab and location	State
Sri Venkateswara Institute of Medical Sciences, Tirupati	Andhra Pradesh
Rangaraya Medical College, Kakinada	Andhra Pradesh
Sidhartha Medical College, Vijayawada	Andhra Pradesh
GMC, Anantapur, AP	Andhra Pradesh
Regional Medical Research Centre, Port Blair, Andaman and Nicobar	Andaman and Nicobar Islands
Gauhati Medical College, Guwahati	Assam
Regional Medical Research Centre, Dibrugarh	Assam
Silchar Medical College, Silchar	Assam
Jorhat Medical College, Jorhat	Assam
Tezpur Medical College, Tezpur
ICMR-Rajendra Memorial National Institute of Health Research (ICMR-RM NIHR) - Formerly (ICMR-RMRIMS), Patna	Bihar
All India Institute of Medical Sciences, Patna	Bihar
Post Graduate Institute of Medical Education and Research, Chandigarh	Chandigarh
All India Institute Medical Sciences, Raipur	Chhattisgarh
All India Institute Medical Sciences, Delhi	Delhi
BJ Medical College, Ahmedabad	Gujarat
M.P.Shah Government Medical College, Jamnagar	Gujarat
Pt. B.D. Sharma Post Graduate Inst. of Med. Sciences, Rohtak, Haryana	Haryana
BPS Govt Medical College, Sonipat	Haryana
Indira Gandhi Medical College, Shimla, Himachal Pradesh	Himachal Pradesh
Dr.Rajendra Prasad Govt. Med. College, Kangra, Tanda, HP	Himachal Pradesh
Sher-e- Kashmir Institute of Medical Sciences, Srinagar	Jammu and Kashmir
Government Medical College, Jammu	Jammu and Kashmir
Government Medical College, Srinagar	Jammu and Kashmir
MGM Medical College, Jamshedpur	Jharkhand
Bangalore Medical College and Research Institute, Bangalore	Karnataka
National Institute of Virology Field Unit Bangalore	Karnataka
Mysore Medical College & Research Institute, Mysore	Karnataka
Hassan Inst. of Med. Sciences, Hassan, Karnataka	Karnataka
Shimoga Inst. of Med. Sciences, Shivamogga, Karnataka	Karnataka
National Institute of Virology Field Unit, Kerala	Kerala
Govt. Medical College, Thriuvananthapuram, Kerala	Kerala
Govt. Medical College, Kozhikhode, Kerala	Kerala
Govt. Medical College, Thrissur	Kerala
Govt. Medical College, Ernakulam
All India Institute Medical Sciences, Bhopal	Madhya Pradesh
National Institute of Research in Tribal Health (NIRTH), Jabalpur	Madhya Pradesh
NEIGRI of Health and Medical Sciences, Shillong, Meghalaya	Meghalaya
Indira Gandhi Government Medical College, Nagpur	Maharashtra
Kasturba Hospital for Infectious Diseases, Mumbai	Maharashtra
NIV Mumbai Unit	Maharashtra
J N Inst. of Med. Sciences Hospital, Imphal-East, Manipur	Manipur
Regional Institute of Medical Sciences, Imphal	Manipur
Regional Medical Research Centre, Bhubaneswar	Odisha
All India Institute of Medical Sciences, Bhubaneswar	Odisha
SCB Medical College and Hospital, Cuttack	Odisha
Jawaharlal Institute of Postgraduate Medical Education and Research, Puducherry	Puducherry
Indira Gandhi Medical College and Research Institute, Puducherry	Puducherry
Government Medical College, Patiala, Punjab	Punjab
Government Medical College, Amritsar	Punjab
Sawai Man Singh, Jaipur	Rajasthan
Dr. S.N Medical College, Jodhpur	Rajasthan
Jhalawar Medical College, Jhalawar, Rajasthan	Rajasthan
RNT Medical College, Udaipur	Rajasthan
SP Med. College, Bikaner, Rajasthan	Rajasthan
King Institute of Preventive Medicine and Research, Chennai	Tamil Nadu
Government Medical College, Theni	Tamil Nadu
Tirunelveli Medical College, Tirunelveli	Tamil Nadu
Govt. Medical College, Thiruvarur	Tamil Nadu
Government Medical College, Agartala
North Tripura District Hospital, Dharmanagar	Tripura
Gandhi Medical College, Secunderabad	Telangana
Osmania Medical College, Hyderabad	Telangana
King's George Medical University, Lucknow	Uttar Pradesh
Institute of Medical Sciences, Banaras Hindu University, Varanasi	Uttar Pradesh
Jawaharlal Nehru Medical College, Aligarh	Uttar Pradesh
Government Medical College, Haldwani	Uttarakhand
National Institute for Research in Bacterial Infections, Kolkata	West Bengal
IPGMER, Kolkata	West Bengal
North Bengal Medical College and Hospital, Siliguri	West Bengal
