= Sugar phosphates =

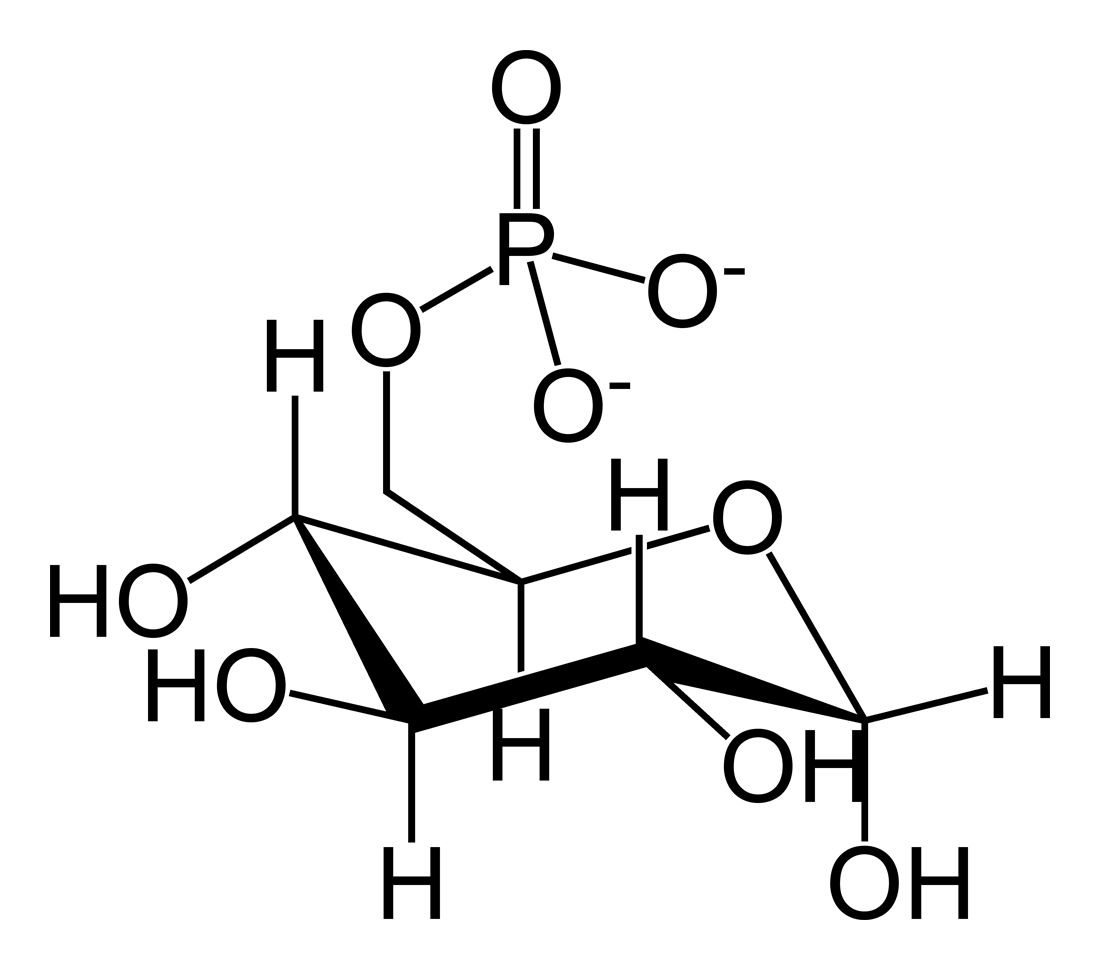
Glucose-6-phosphate

Phytic acid

Sugar phosphates (sugars that have added or substituted phosphate groups) are often used in biological systems to store or transfer energy. They also form the backbone for DNA and RNA. Sugar phosphate backbone geometry is altered in the vicinity of the modified nucleotides.

Examples include:

- Dihydroxyacetone phosphate
- Glucose-6-phosphate
- Phytic acid
- Teichoic acid

== Electronic structure of the sugar-phosphate backbone ==
The sugar-phosphate backbone has multiplex electronic structure and the electron delocalisation complicates its theoretical description. Some part of the electronic density is delocalised over the whole backbone and the extent of the delocalisation is affected by backbone conformation due to hyper-conjugation effects. Hyper-conjugation arises from donor-acceptor interactions of localised orbitals in 1,3 positions.

== Phosphodiesters in DNA and RNA ==
The phosphodiester backbone of DNA and RNA consists of pairs of deoxyribose or ribose sugars linked by phosphates at the respective 3' and 5' positions. The backbone is negatively charged and hydrophilic, which allows strong interactions with water. Sugar-phosphate backbone forms the structural framework of nucleic acids, including DNA and RNA.

Sugar phosphates are defined as carbohydrates to which a phosphate group is bound by an ester or an either linkage, depending on whether it involves an alcoholic or a hemiacetalic hydroxyl, respectively. Solubility, acid hydrolysis rates, acid strengths, and ability to act as sugar group donors are the knowledge of physical and chemical properties required for the analysis of both types of sugar phosphates. The photosynthetic carbon reduction cycle is closely associated with sugar phosphates, and sugar phosphates are one of the key molecules in metabolism, oxidative pentose phosphate pathways, gluconeogenesis, important intermediates in glycolysis. Sugar phosphates are not only involved in metabolic regulation and signaling but also involved in the synthesis of other phosphate compounds.

== Peptide nucleic acids ==
Peptide nucleic acid (PNA) is a nucleic acid in which natural nucleic acid has been replaced by a synthetic peptide backbone formed from N-(2-amino-ethyl)-glycine units along with sugar phosphate backbone forming in an achiral and uncharged moiety that mimics RNA or DNA oligonucleotides. PNA cannot be degraded inside living cells but it is chemically stable and resistant to hydrolytic (enzymatic) cleavage.

== Role in metabolism ==
Sugar phosphates are major players in metabolism due to their task of storing and transferring energy. Not only ribose 5-phosphate but also fructose 6-phosphate are an intermediate of the pentose-phosphate pathway which generates nicotinamide adenine dinucleotide phosphate (NADPH) and pentoses from glucose polymers and their degradation products. The pathway is known as glycolysis where the same carbohydrates are degraded into pyruvates thus providing energy. Enzymes are catalysed for the reactions of these pathways. Some enzymes contain metal centers in their active site which is important part of the enzymes and as well as for the catalysed reaction. The phosphate group can coordinate to the metal center for example, 1,6-bisphosphatase and ADP-ribose pyrophosphatase.

Phosphoglycerate and several sugar phosphates that are known intermediates of the Calvin photosynthetic carbon cycle, stimulate light-dependent carbon dioxide fixation by isolated chloroplasts. This ability is shared by certain other metabolites (e.g. glucose 1-phosphate) from which the accepted Calvin-cycle intermediates could easily be derived by known metabolic routes.
