= All India Institute of Medical Sciences, Delhi =

Government University and Hospital in Delhi, India

- अखिल भारतीय आयुर्विज्ञान संस्थान, नई दिल्ली
- Official seal of AIIMS Delhi
- Motto: शरीरमाद्यं खलु धर्मसाधनम् Sharīramādyam khalu dharmasādhanam
- Motto in English: "The body is indeed the primary instrument of dharma."
- Type: Public medical school
- Established: 1956; 70 years ago
- Budget: ₹5,500.92 crore (US$570 million) (FY2026)
- President: Union Minister of Health and Family Welfare
- Director: Dr. Nikhil Tandon
- Academic staff: 859
- Administrative staff: 10,701
- Students: 3,769
- Undergraduates: 1,159
- Postgraduates: 2,071
- Doctoral students: 343
- Other students: 539
- Location: Delhi, Delhi NCT, India; 28.565°N 77.21°E
- Campus: 213.12 acres (86.25 ha); Urban
- Language: English
- Other campuses: Jhajjar; Ballabhgarh; Ghaziabad
- Average OPD Attendance: 16,419 (2024)
- Website: www.aiims.edu
- Government of India (MoHFW)

Organisation
- Type: Teaching hospital

Services
- Standards: NMC, INI
- Emergency department: Level I Trauma Center
- Beds: 3,657

Helipads
- Helipad: Yes

All India Institute of Medical Sciences, Delhi, also known as AIIMS New Delhi, is a public medical university and hospital in South Delhi, India. The institute is governed by the AIIMS Act, 1956 and operates autonomously under the Ministry of Health and Family Welfare. It is regarded as one of the best public medical research universities and hospitals in India.

== History ==
The idea of AIIMS arose in 1946, after a recommendation by the Health Survey of the Government of India. From then to the establishment and development of AIIMS (Delhi) over the ensuing years, several illustrious individuals played their part in bringing the idea to fruition. Originally proposed by the then Prime Minister of India Jawaharlal Nehru for establishment in Calcutta, it was established in Delhi following the refusal of Chief Minister of West Bengal Bidhan Chandra Roy. The foundation stone of AIIMS Delhi was laid in 1952.

On 18 February 1956, the then Minister of Health, Rajkumari Amrit Kaur, introduced a new bill in the Lok Sabha, that would eventually become the AIIMS Act. She said,

It has been one of my cherished dreams that for post graduate study and for the maintenance of high standards of medical education in our country, we should have an institute of this nature which would enable our young men and women to have their post graduate education in their own country.

The old and new main OPD blocks at AIIMS, Delhi are named after her. When the bill was adopted in May 1956, it became the All India Institute of Medical Sciences Act, 1956.

== Campuses ==
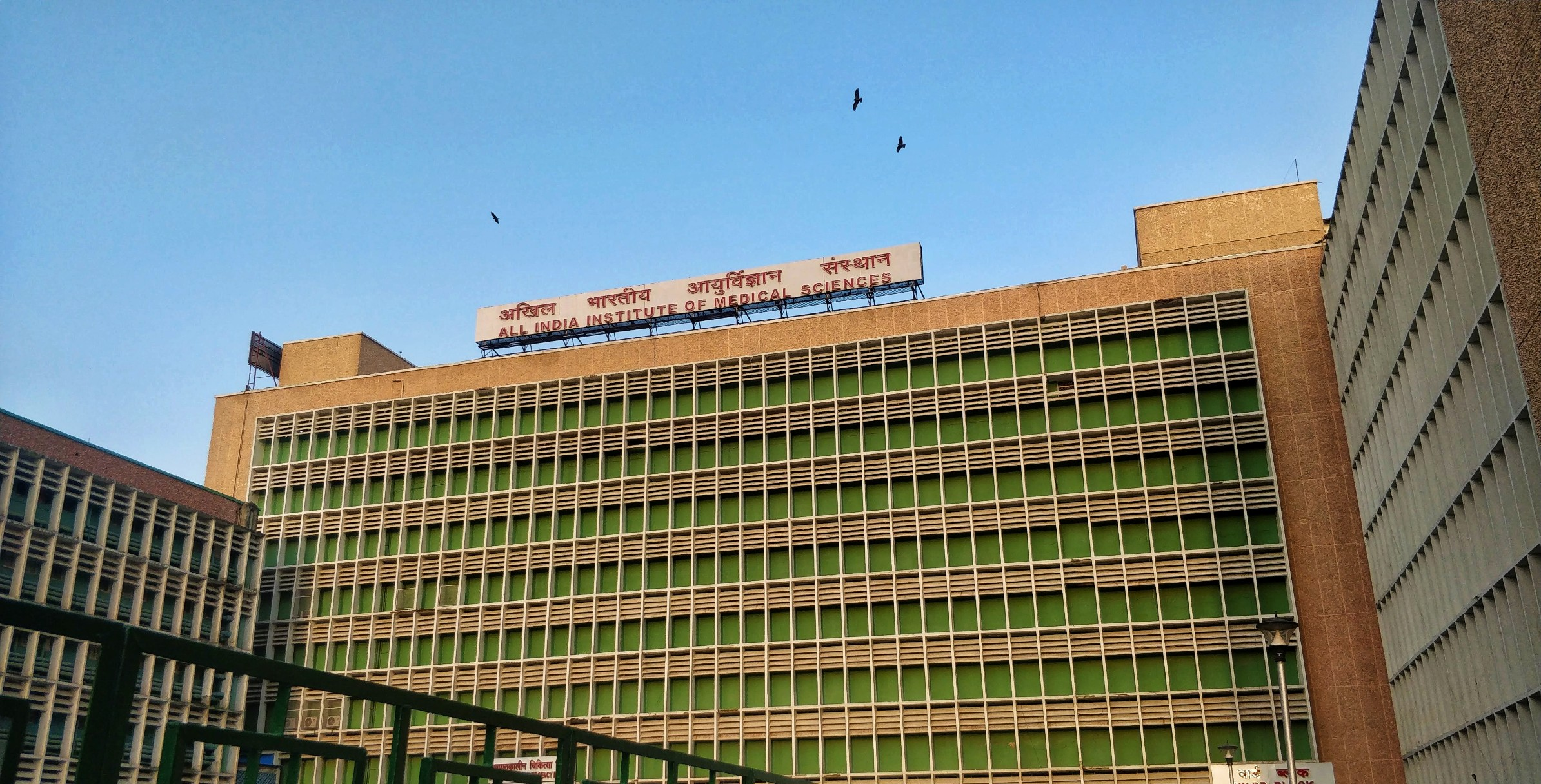
Emergency block building situated within the East Campus.

The whole campus is spread over an area of 213.12 acres.

=== Main campus ===
AIIMS, Delhi's main campus is located in Ansari Nagar in Delhi. It is adjacent to the South Extension-II market and lies on both sides of the Sri Aurobindo Marg, southwards to the AIIMS Roundabout flyover crossing.

AIIMS, Delhi's main campus is divided into five smaller campuses:

1. East Campus – Containing OPD Block, Main Hospital Block, Ward Block, Medical College, Research Section, Convergence Block, BB Dixit Library, Administrative Wing, Undergraduates Hostels, Central Lawn, Jawaharlal Auditorium and staff quarters. The 4 Specialty Centers for Cardiothoracic + Neurosciences, Cancer Center, Center for Ophthalmic Sciences and Center for Dental Education and Research are also within this East Campus.
2. West Campus – It comprises mainly staff quarters and residences.
3. JPNA Trauma Center – It is exclusively designated for Emergency services. In June 2018, a tunnel and ramp road link between the east campus and JPNA Trauma Center Campus was also opened. This link route is very useful in fast transferring of critical patients across the two Campuses. Beside JPNA Trauma Center, new 100 Bed Plastic and Burns Surgical Unit Hospital is also running, it will also comprise a Skin Bank for Burns Injuries.
4. Masjid Moth Campus – This site contains new Post-Graduate and Resident Doctor's apartments. Underground parking block is also situated here. Upcoming New Rajkumari Amrit Kaur OPD Block, Mother and Child Block, Surgical Block and Geriatric Block (National Centre for Ageing) are also functional here. Dr Prasun Chatterjee, is MD at this centre. He is an associate professor at Department of Geriatric Medicine.
5. Ayurvigyan Nagar Campus – It is too for faculty and staff's residential accommodations.

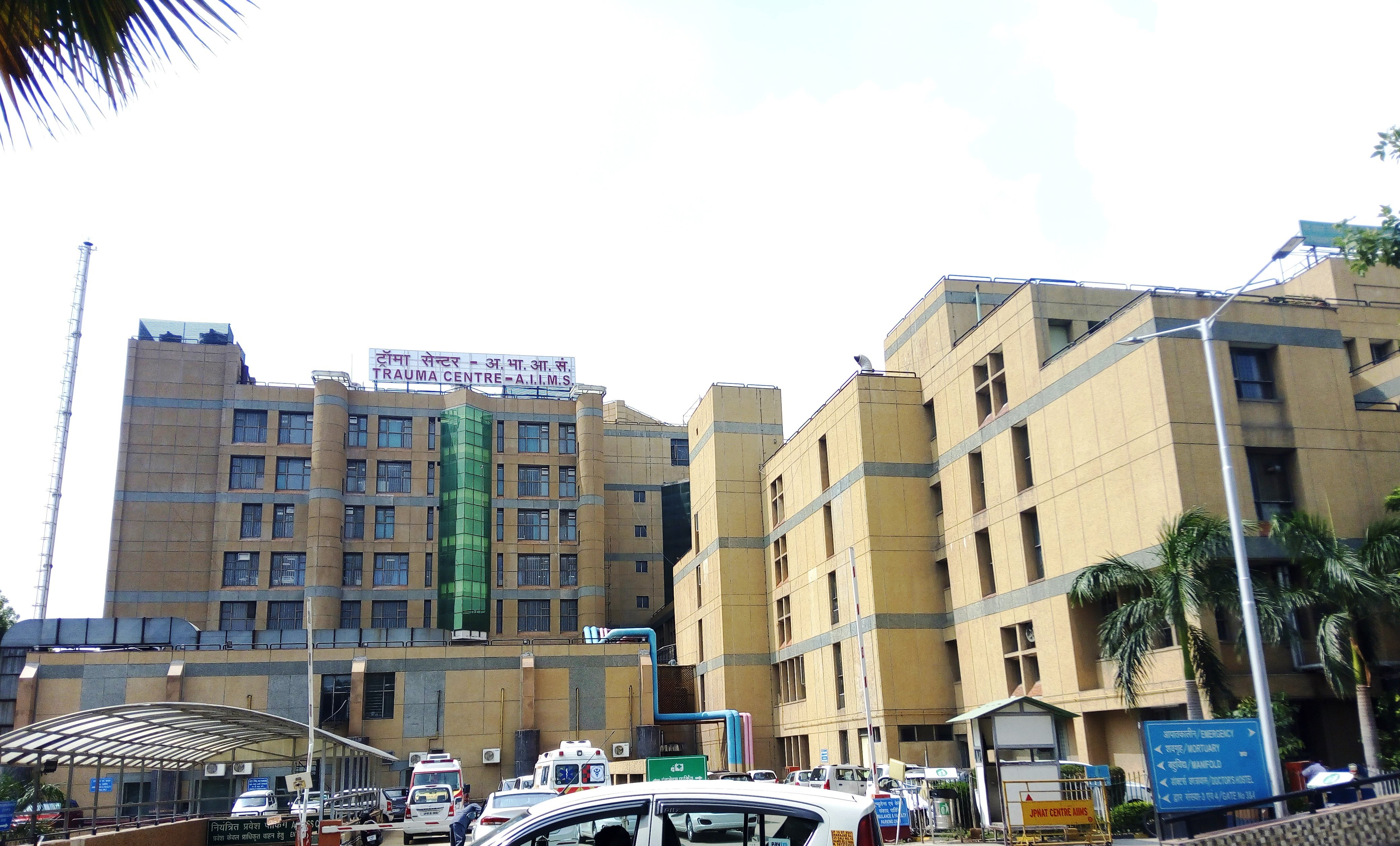
JPNA Trauma Center building

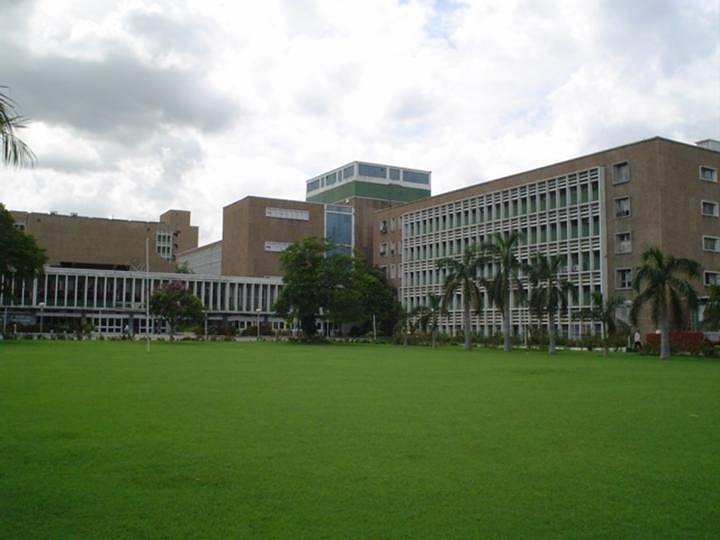
Central lawn, with teaching block in the background

Across AIIMS is Safdarjung Hospital and associated Vardhman Mahavir Medical College (of Guru Gobind Singh Indraprastha University). Also, adjacently lies the headquarters of Indian Council of Medical Research, the body that coordinates and funds medical research in India. In vicinity, also lies National Medical Library, run by the Directorate-General of Health Services of the Government of India. It has a vast collection of scientific and medical journals that can be accessed by researchers.

=== Extension campuses of AIIMS Delhi Jhajjar-AIIMS-II ===
The second campus of All India Institute of Medical Sciences (AIIMS-II), spread over 330 acres (1.335 square kilometres) of land was visualized during the period of Prof. Tirath Das Dogra as Director AIIMS Delhi and Anbumani Ramadoss (President, AIIMS), Minister of Health and Family welfare union of India in 2009 at Bhadsha village [also spelled Badsa] in Haryana's Jhajjar district. AIIMS-II was thought to be developed as the largest medical Education centre for super-specialities in the world to meet the enormous need of super-specialists in various field in India. The 330 acres of land was donated by the then Chief Minister Bhupinder Singh Hooda, of Haryana to Anbumani Ramadoss, in presence of Director AIIMS Tirath Das Dogra, in a big public function on 28 February 2009 at the proposed site. The National Cancer Institute is first to come up, next is the National Cardiovascular centre as a joint venture between Govt of Haryana and Union health ministry in a series of future developments as envisaged. The next under the plan is a unique collaborative centre between IITD-Jhajjar campus located adjacent to the AIIMS (Delhi)'s Jhajjar Extension. They jointly are to set up a "biomedical research park", running joint PhD/research programmes managed through the Foundation for Innovation and Technology Transfer (FITT).

==== National Cancer Institute (NCI) and upcoming National Heart Institute ====
The 710 bedded National Cancer Institute of India and Infectious and Community Diseases Centre at AIIMS (Delhi)'s Jhajjar Extension Campus is constructed at a cost of ₹2,034 crores on 32 acres along the lines of National Cancer Institute of the USA and it is focused on treatment and research on the India-specific cancer.

It became operational on 18 December 2018 including OPD, lab and 250-bed hospital which will be expanded to 710 beds by December 2019. It is headed by Dr. G.K. Rath former Head of Department of Oncology at AIIMS (Delhi). National Heart Institute (India) is also being established here. A heliport is being developed here in January 2019 for the Air Ambulance to serve emergency patients from remote areas.

==== Ballabhgarh Extension campus ====
Ballabhgarh, established in 1965, is an extension campus of AIIMS in Ballabhgarh city of Faridabad district in Haryana. This rural field practice OPD campus was set up in collaboration with Government of Haryana as "Comprehensive Rural Health Services Project" – "Ballabgarh Health and Demographic Surveillance System". In 1961 Rural Field Practice was established at AIIMS (Delhi) with the help of Rockefeller Foundation. In 1965, the Comprehensive Rural Health Services Project was set up at Ballabgarh with a 50-bed hospital, 24 hr emergency and obstetric facilities, outpatient services in medicine, surgery, pediatrics, gynaecology and obstetrics, eye, otorhinolaryngology, psychiatry, physical medicine and rehabilitation, pediatric surgery, dental care, homeopathy, NCD clinic, ANC (Antenatal Checkup) clinic, immunization clinic, laboratory, radiological and ultra-sonography services.

==== Ghaziabad Extension campus ====
An intensive field practice area, the National Drug Dependence Treatment Centre is an extension campus of AIIMS (Delhi) in Ghaziabad city of Uttar Pradesh.

The Drug Dependence Treatment Centre, AIIMS was established in the year 1988 and was functional in Delhi. In 2003 it was upgraded as a National Centre (National Drug Dependence Treatment Centre) and is fully operational from its new premises in Ghaziabad, Delhi-NCR since April 2003.

NDDTC has been established as the apex centre for treatment of drugs and substance abuse disorders in the country. It provides a state of art model for de-addiction treatments. This centre has full range of specialists and facilities. The NDDTC is situated on 10 acre beautiful campus. It is presently having 50 bedded treatment facilities

PhD Programme in the area of Addiction Psychiatry and DM (Addiction Psychiatry) Programme started since year 2012 and 2015 respectively.

The Ex-Chief of the centre was a member of the International Narcotics Control Board (INCB), a monitoring body under the United Nations.

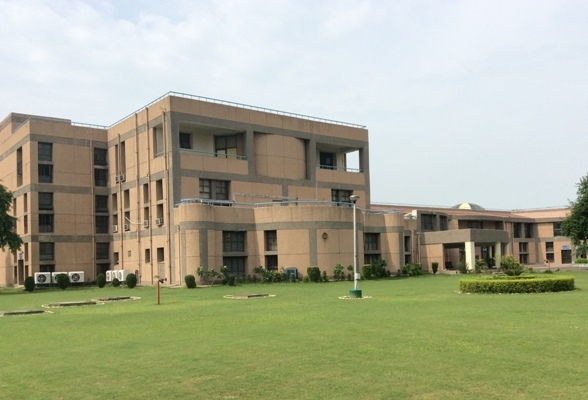
NDDTC of AIIMS

NDDTC has been designated as a WHO Collaborating Centre on Substance Abuse (2012–2020)

=== AIIMS (Delhi) Campus Redevelopment Master plan 2019 ===
In February 2019 The Union Cabinet chaired by Prime Minister of India has given 'in principle' approval to the Implementation of Master Plan to convert All India Institute of Medical Sciences (AIIMS), Delhi into a world class Medical University.

The visualization at the time of institute's construction (in 1950s) was for a limited number of patients. The medical institute was established as a tertiary-care centre, but now it has turned into a primary care centre. Over time, the requirement has increased manifold. The upcoming master plan will now have a vision for the next decade.

- The Master Plan envisages freeing up adequate space through redevelopment, vertical expansion and reorganizing the land usage, thus optimizing the infrastructure of the Institute for the next 20 years.
- It is proposed to re-develop the infrastructure of AIIMS, Delhi by consolidating the Patient Care, Teaching, Research, Administration and support services in areas in the East Ansari Nagar (Main) Campus and residential facilities from East Ansari Nagar (Main Campus) to Trauma Centre Extension (New Rajnagar) Campus.

Benefits:

The project would provide complete healthcare to the patients and a 'One Campus' answer to all the investigative, physiotherapeutic, operative, and rehabilitative needs of the patients. It would ensure mobility and accessibility for the patients and become a care centre for advancement of research, clinical applications and management of patients.

==== Works expected as per the Redevelopment Master plan ====
By 2024, AIIMS (Delhi) will add around 3,000 more beds to its existing strength of 2,478 beds. So there will be a facility of approximately 5,500 beds in service by then.

At the time of the plan's approval, the hospital had a daily footfall of about 15,000 patients and their attendants. The plan also aimed to strengthen patient-care services and residential facilities for faculty and staff.

Officials said the estimated cost of executing the master plan is around ₹10,345 crore, including ₹1,000 crore for hiring manpower. The project will be completed in two phases; while Phase 1 will be completed in 46 months, the second phase will be finalized in 70 months. As per the plan, a convention centre, a guesthouse with 40 rooms, a hostel with more than 4,500 rooms and 500 residential units with allied car parking will be set up.

As there is no scope of further expansion with the limited availability of land, residential facilities stretching from Trauma Centre campus, West Campus (Ansari Nagar) to East Campus (Ansari Nagar) and Ayurvigyan Nagar Campus will be relocated. This will free up space in the main campus and allow to expand vertically.

With senior faculty members raising issues of shortage of labs and operation theaters in the institute, the administration hopes the upcoming project will look into that concern. This new plan will also create scope for research projects, which have been pending due to space constraints.

== Healthcare ==
=== Clinical statistics for session 2024–2025 ===
Hospital Services at AIIMS, Delhi (2024–25) ( source: 69th Annual-Report)
Hospital/Centre	Outpatients (including casualty)	Inpatients (patients admitted)	Surgeries (operations/procedures)	Beds		
Hospital/Centre	Outpatients (including casualty)	Inpatients (patients admitted)	Surgeries (operations/procedures)	General	Private	TOTAL
Main Hospital	2,268,551	158,450	142,383	1,706	214	1,920
Cardiothoracic Centre	151,807	11,065	3,422	226	33	464
Neurosciences Centre	145,610	10,412	3,223	174	31	464
Dr. RP Centre (Ophthalmic Centre)	607,304	52,852	51,717	288	22	310
JPNA Trauma Centre	170,576	7,379	7,535	238	21	259
Dr. BRA-IRCH (Cancer Centre)	215,093	67,670	9,781	174	15	189
CCM (Centre for Community Medicine)	474,686	7,407	597	50		50
NDDTC (National Drug Dependence Treatment Centre)	347,054	1,345	- - -	50	- - -	50
CDER (Dental Centre)	282,475	1,376	945	20	- - -	20
NCI Jhajjar	104,009	43,280	36,348	387	8	395
Outreach patients (Badsha, Jhajjar, Haryana)	129,407	- - -	- - -	- - -	- - -	- - -
TOTAL:	4,843,572 (4.8 million+)	361,236 (360k+)	257,481 (257k+)	3,313	344	3,657 beds

=== Specialty centres ===
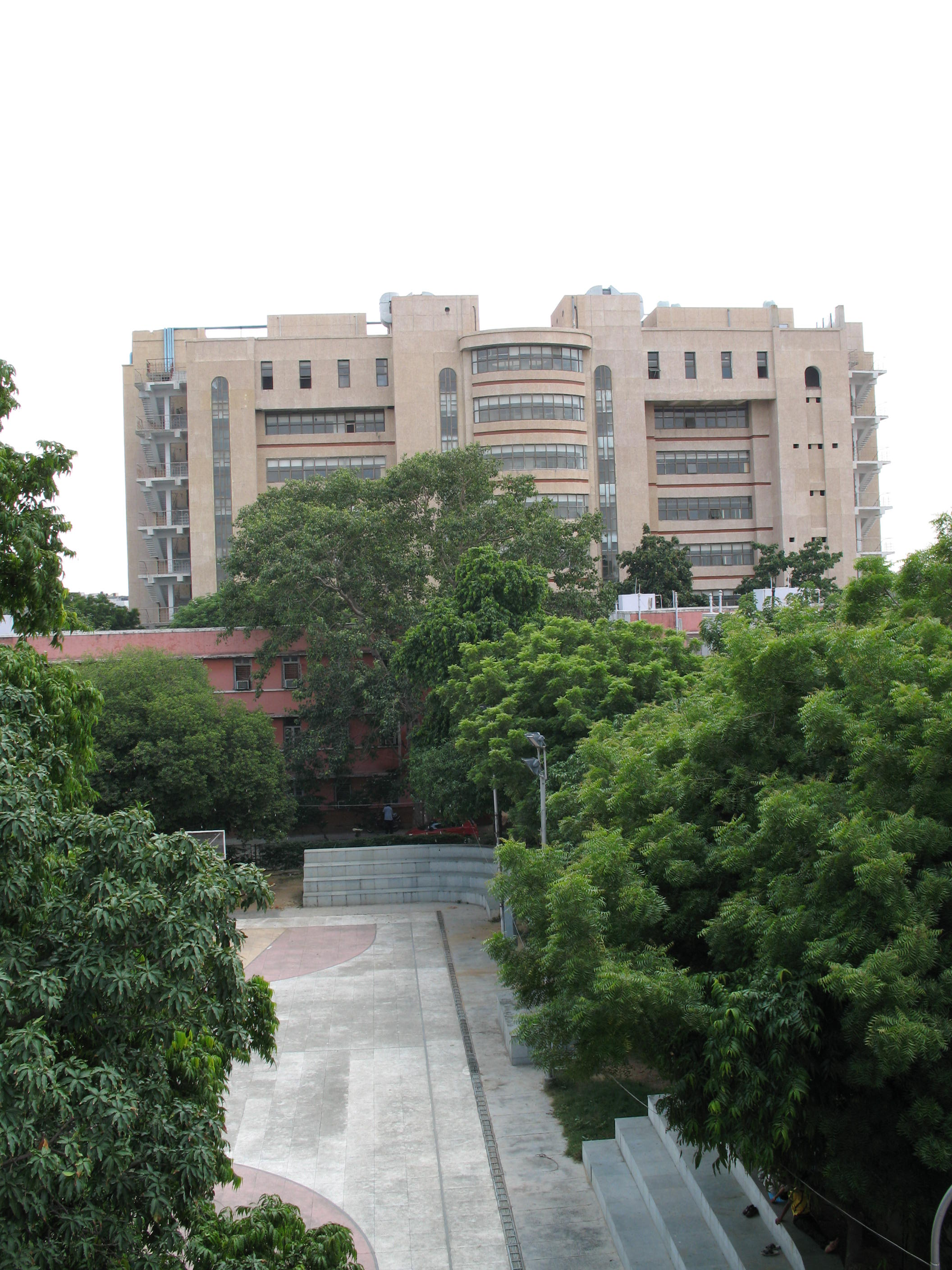
Centre for Dental Education and Research in background with hostels and the basketball court in foreground

- Dr. Rajendra Prasad Centre for Ophthalmic Sciences:
  Established in 1967 by the Ministry of Health and Family Welfare, it is a 310-bed ophthalmic specialty centre.
- Dr. BR Ambedkar Institute Rotary Cancer Hospital:
  It specialises in the treatment of cancer and hosts departments viz. surgical, medical and radiation oncology. Total beds are 182.
- Jai Prakash Narayan Apex Trauma Centre:
  It is India's first full-fledged centre to treat victims of trauma. It is located about 1 km west of the main campus. It has a bed strength of 243.
- Centre for Dental Education and Research:
  Located adjacent to the Hostels, is AIIMS' newest specialty centre. The centre commenced a 4-year collaboration with WHO for oral health promotion. The Ministry of Health and Family Welfare of the Government of India designated this centre as National Centre for Excellence for implementation of National Oral Health Programme in the country. This centre provides technical support on oral health to the government and WHO. Despite having very few faculty members, this centre has been giving best research output per person in the country. It contains 17 beds.
- Cardiothoracic and Neurosciences Centre:
  Offers superspecialty patient care, training and research in the respective fields. Containing totally 464 beds.
- National Drug Dependence Treatment Centre, Ghaziabad:
  It is a WHO collaborating centre on substance abuse containing 50 beds.
- Centre for Community Medicine, Ballabhgarh:
  It maintains a teaching and treatment facility at Ballabgarh, which is a periurban area outside Delhi, it also provides comprehensive services to 84000 population. Faculty members from AIIMS (Delhi) are posted there by rotation. It contains 50 beds.

== Academics ==
=== Admissions ===
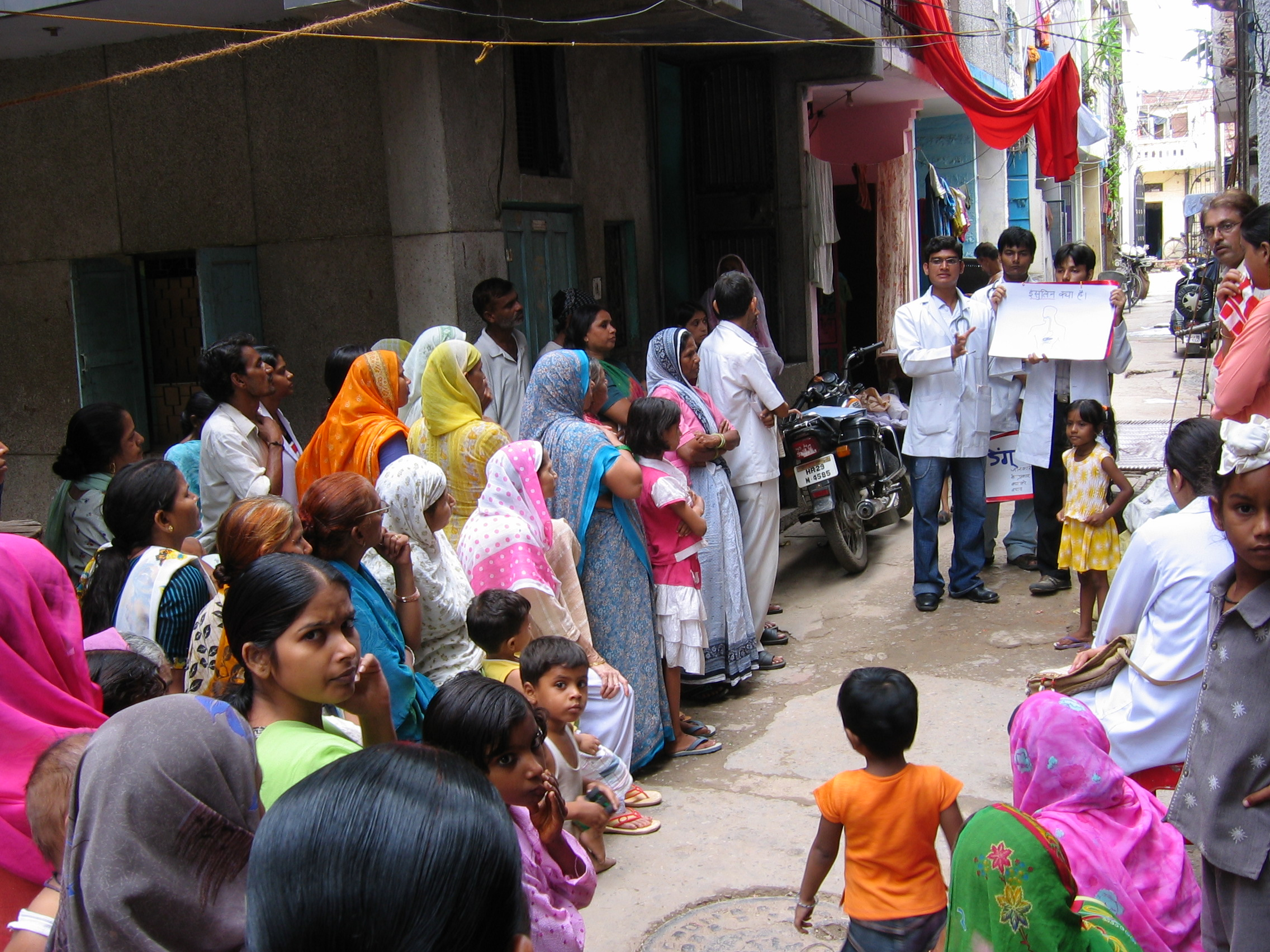
AIIMS students educating residents of a Delhi slum about preventing mosquito-borne illnesses

AIIMS (Delhi) was originally established as a super-specialty tertiary care centre with primary emphasis on research and specialized training facilities. MBBS is the basic medical course at bachelor's degree level. This is followed by master's degree level specialisation in general surgery, general medicine, pediatrics and other fields. Superspecialties are those healthcare fields whose practitioners need specialised certification after completing their postgraduation, examples being cardiothoracic and vascular surgery, rheumatology, neurology, and pediatric neurology. There are at least 45 superspecialties at AIIMS (Delhi) at higher master's degree level. AIIMS also offers MSc and PhD level research courses.

There are about forty-two specialty post-graduate courses conducted at AIIMS (Delhi). The entry is through a nationwide competitive examination, INI-CET, held every six months. Each year nearly 50 thousand medical graduates and 25 thousand dental graduates across the country compete for the limited number of positions, approximately <1% of the candidates are admitted through the process.

AIIMS publishes The National Medical Journal of India.

=== Changes in Entrance Examination pattern under the provisions of NMC Bill 2019 ===
As per the latest official notification released by the Ministry of Health and Family Welfare, AIIMS, JIPMER -Puducherry, PGI -Chandigarh & all INIs (Institutes of National Importance) were directed not to conduct any Undergraduate entrance exams from 2020 onwards.

Government has said that from 2020 session onwards, all such undergraduate admissions would be taken up only through a single national level examination NEET-UG conducted by NTA (National Testing Agency).

Many field experts however criticized this exam unification, specifically with respect to AIIMS (Delhi), citing the reason that the level of questions in AIIMS-UG entrance exams (for both MBBS & BSc Nursing courses separately) used to be of such a higher & deep logical-conceptual thinking capabilities, that they eventually served a greater advantage for selecting the most desirable students for such scientific courses. And that was something really crucial for the main objectives for which AIIMS (Delhi) was established, which are cutting-edge research, medical innovations and to demonstrate high standards of medical education to all medical colleges and allied institutions in India.

== Rankings ==
Life Sciences and Medicine University rankings

Medical – India
- NIRF (2024): 1
- India Today (2024): 1
- Outlook India (2024): 1

AIIMS was the first Indian medical center to perform a successful cardiac transplant. The surgery was performed by P Venugopal, the ex-director of AIIMS, in 1994. AIIMS is an advanced center of stem cell therapy in India, especially cardiac and neurological. It holds a reputation of being a pioneer in stem cell injection. The first in-vitro fertilization facility in the public sector was set up at AIIMS, Delhi in February 2008.

AIIMS Delhi was ranked 204th in the world and first in South Asia in the category of Life Sciences and Medicine by QS WUR in 2022. The institute was also featured in the World's Best Hospitals 2020 – Top 100 by Newsweek.

AIIMS Delhi was ranked first among medical colleges in India by the National Institutional Ranking Framework in 2024. It was also ranked first in India by India Today in 2024 and first among government colleges by Outlook India in 2024.

== Controversies ==
=== Scams and whistleblower case ===
- On 29 June 2012, IFoS officer Sanjiv Chaturvedi was made Deputy Secretary of AIIMS (Delhi). He was also given the charge of Chief Vigilance Officer (CVO) at AIIMS. As the CVO, Chaturvedi took action in a large number of corruption cases involving:
1. Selling of counterfeit medicines at a private on-campus pharmacy owned by an MLA
2. Corruption in recruitment
3. Purchase of medical equipments & consumables
4. Financial irregularities in ₹3,850 crore (equivalent to ₹79 billion or US$820 million in 2026) construction projects and tenure extension of then Head of Engineering-Wing supervising these projects
5. Unauthorized foreign trips by doctors
6. Single bid tendering
7. Corruption in computerization purchases
8. Treatment of officers' pet dog at institute
9. Matters of subletting
10. Pension fund scam
11. Sexual harassment
12. Serious violations by security contractor firms
- Chaturvedi initiated actions in around 200 corruption cases during his stint as AIIMS CVO; punishment was imposed in 78 cases, chargesheet was issued in 87 cases and more than 20 cases were referred to CBI for criminal investigation. These cases included the ones against senior IAS officer Vineet Chawdhry, of Himachal Pradesh cadre, who had worked earlier as Deputy. Director (Administration), former deputy director (Administration) Shailesh Yadav, a senior IPS officer, many senior faculty members, former Registrar V.P. Gupta and former Chief Administrative Officer Attar Singh.

==== CBI inquiries and further results ====
Subsequently, on many investigations done by Chaturvedi, CBI registered cases and recommended action against Vineet Chawdhry. As per India Today investigative report of June 2017, J P Nadda, Union Health Minister was found to have hushed up investigation into what the report termed as 7000 crore scam, detailing CBI report and scathing reports of Parliamentary Committee. Opposition parties on basis of this investigative report and documents mentioned in the report, accused Nadda of links with senior IAS officer Vineet Chawdhry who had earlier worked with Nadda in Himachal Pradesh

- Earlier in September 2013, CBI had registered a criminal case on basis of enquiry done by Vigilance Cell of AIIMS, regarding large scale fake payments made in security wing of AIIMS and financial irregularities into security contract award to a private company.
- In October 2015, CBI, on basis of enquiry done by Chaturvedi, found then AIIMS Director, Dr. M C Mishra, and certain other AIIMS officials including store officer guilty of involvement in corruption in purchase of medical items including disinfectants in trauma centre, on basis of wrong propriety certificate and recommended action against them to Health Ministry, as deemed fit.
- Again, in January 2018 CBI registered criminal case under sections of forgery and Prevention of Corruption Act, 1988 against certain AIIMS officials for corruption in purchase in Surgery Department, to favour particular firms, on basis of enquiry report sent by Chaturvedi as CVO to CBI in May 2014.
- However, it was found later on that all the major corruption cases exposed and being investigated by CVO Chaturvedi, involving senior IAS, IPS officers, AIIMS Director and senior AIIMS officials were being hushed up after Chaturvedi's removal and taking over of Health Ministry by J P Nadda.
- In August 2014, Chaturvedi was relieved from the charge of CVO.
- On 16 August, he wrote a letter to the new health minister Harsh Vardhan, alleging that his removal from the CVO post was a result of campaign by corrupt officials. He was supported by AIIMS staff, who wrote a letter to the Prime Minister asking for his reinstatement. The Aam Aadmi Party (AAP) held protests in his support

=== Institutional preference seats ===
- Around year 2002 AIIMS decision to reserving 33% of post-graduation seats as institutional preference seats for its own undergraduate MBBS students, resulted in a controversy as it practically resulted in a 100% reservation for subjects, was struck down by the Supreme Court of India. In 2006 Union Health Minister Anbumani Ramadoss, who was a supporter of 27% reservation for Other Backward Classes, caused a controversy when he replaced P. Venugopal with T. D. Dogra as Director of AIIMS (Delhi). The initial personality conflict between Ramadoss and Venugopal later become politicised as a conflict on reservation issue, as anti-reservation students and faculty of AIIMS (Delhi) went on strike in favor of Venugopal. The issue was put to rest when Venugopal was reinstated by the Supreme Court.

=== AIIMS server attack ===
On 23 November 2022, servers of AIIMS Delhi were hacked by a ransomware attack after an employee opened a phishing mail. The hackers have encrypted the servers and were demanding ₹200 crores in cryptocurrency, however Delhi Police did not confirm reports of ransom demand. Patient care services in emergency, outpatient, inpatient and laboratory wings were forced to be managed manually. Investigation has confirmed that five main servers were targeted by Chinese hackers based out of Hong Kong. Delhi Police, Representatives of Ministry of Home Affairs, Indian Computer Emergency Response Team (CERT-IN), Centre for Development of Advanced Computing (C-DAC) and National Informatics Centre (NIC) are investigating the ransomware attack. A case of extortion and cyber terrorism was registered by the Intelligence Fusion and Strategic Operations (IFSO) unit of the Delhi Police on 25 November. The online registration of new patients visiting the OPD at the AIIMS resumed on 6 December 2022 while online OPD booking system was restored by 2nd week of December 2022.

== Directors ==
- Bhalchandra Babaji Dikshit (1956–64), Padma Bhushan, founder Director
- Khushwant Lal Wig (1964–69), Padma Vibhushan, first Dean of the Faculty
- V. Ramalingaswami (1969–1979), Padma Vibhushan, first Director-General of Indian Council of Medical Research
- L. P. Agarwal (1979–80)
- H. D. Tandon (1980–1984)
- Sneh Bhargava (1984–1990)
- S. K. Kacker (1990–1995)
- L. M. Nath (1995–1996)
- L. K. Bhutani (1996)
- P. K. Dave (1996–2003)
- P. Venugopal (2003–2007) (May–June 2008), Padma Bhushan
- Tirath Das Dogra (2007–2009), a forensic expert in India
- Ramesh C. Deka (2009–2013)
- M. C. Misra (2013–2017)
- Randeep Guleria (2017–2022)
- M. Srinivas (2022–2026)
- Nikhil Tandon (2026–present)

== Notable people ==
=== Alumni ===
- B. K. Misra - Neurosurgeon, recipient of Dr. B. C. Roy Award
- Sudeep Gupta - Medical Oncologist. Director of Tata Memorial Hospital, Mumbai
- Amita Aggarwal, MBBS, MD, N-Bios laureate
- Rakesh Yadav, DM 1998, recipient of Dr. B. C. Roy Award (2014)
- Raj Kumar, MCh 1993, founding director of All India Institute of Medical Sciences, Rishikesh.
- Rakesh Aggarwal, MBBS 1983, National Bioscience Award for Career Development recipient
- Rameshwar Nath Koul Bamezai, Padma Shri recipient
- Sathyanarayana Srikanta, MD 1981, medical director at Samatvam Endocrinology Diabetes Center
- Soumya Swaminathan, MD - Chief Scientist, World Health Organization
- Ragini Sonkar, MBBS, MD - MLA Uttar Pradesh (Machhlishahr constituency)

=== Faculty ===
- Abul K Abbas, Chair of Department of Pathology at University of California San Francisco
- Alka Kriplani, Padma Shri recipient
- Dr. Arvind Kumar, B.C. Roy recipient and Founder Trustee of Lung Care Foundation
- Ashok Kumar Hemal, Padma Shri recipient
- Atul Kumar, Padma Shri recipient
- Autar Singh Paintal, physiologist
- B. N. B. Rao, Padma Shri recipient
- Balram Bhargava, Padma Shri recipient
- Deepak Chopra, Indian-American writer and new age alternative medicine promoter
- Jitendra Nath Pande, Padma Shri recipient
- K. Srinath Reddy, Padma Bhushan recipient and Head of Public Health Foundation of India
- Lalit Kumar, Padma Shri recipient
- Meharban Singh, Neonatologist
- Naval Kishore Vikram, N-Bios laureate
- Pramod Kumar Julka, Padma Shri recipient
- Rakesh Yadav, recipient of Dr. B. C. Roy Award
- Ramesh Bijlani
- Randeep Guleria, former director of AIIMS Delhi
- Sanjiv Chopra, Dean of Continuing Medical Education at Harvard Medical School
- Sujata Sharma, N-Bios laureate
- Tirath Das Dogra, forensic pathologist
- Vinay Kumar, Chair of Pathology Department at University of Chicago
- Suresh Chandra Sharma, Chairman of National Medical Commission
- Vinod Kumar Paul, NITI Aayog member
- Dr. Ambuj Roy, Professor of Cardiology
- Vipin Buckshey, Padma Shri recipient

=== Recipients of Shanti Swarup Bhatnagar Award ===
The following individuals who have trained or worked at AIIMS, Delhi, have won the CSIR's Shanti Swarup Bhatnagar Prize for Science and Technology for research:

- Anil Kumar Mandal, Ophthalmologist
- Anurag Agrawal, Pulmonologist
- B. K. Anand, Physiologist
- Birendra Nath Mallick, Neurobiologist
- Deepak Gaur, Molecular biologist
- Indira Nath, founder Head of the Department of Biotechnology at AIIMS, Delhi
- Maharaj Kishan Bhan, Pediatrician and Padma Bhushan recipient
- Narinder Kumar Mehra, Immunologist
- Nuggehalli Raghuveer Moudgal, Endocrinologist
- Pradeep Seth, Microbiologist
- Pushkar Sharma, Medical Scientist
- Ravinder Goswami, Endocrinologist
- Santosh G. Honavar, Ocular oncologist
- Satish K. Gupta, Immunologist
- Shashi Wadhwa, Neurobiologist
- Shiv Kumar Sarin, Gastroenterologist and a former chairman of the Board of Governors of the Medical Council of India.
- Subrat Kumar Panda, Virologist
- T. C. Anand Kumar, Reproductive biologist
- Turaga Desiraju, Neurophysiologist
- V. Ramalingaswami, Pathologist
- Vijay Kumar, Molecular Biologist

== See also ==
- AIIMS - list of all AIIMS institutes in India
