= Satish K. Gupta =

Indian immunologist

- Born: 20 April 1953 (age 73); Chhachhrauli, Haryana, India
- Education: University of Delhi; AIIMS Delhi
- Known for: Studies on reproductive immunology
- Awards: 1982 INSA Young Scientists Medal; 1984 ICMR Shakuntala Amir Chand Prize; 1994 VASVIK Industrial Research Award; 1997 Shanti Swarup Bhatnagar Prize; Population Control and Family Planning Award; 2011 Ranbaxy Research Award
- Scientific career
- Fields: Immunology
- Workplaces: National Institute of Immunology

Satish Kumar Gupta (born 20 April 1953) is an Indian immunologist and an Emeritus Scientist at the National Institute of Immunology. Known for his research in reproductive immunology, Gupta is an elected fellow of all the three Indian science academies viz. Indian Academy of Sciences, National Academy of Sciences, India and Indian National Science Academy (Note: Long link – please select G and click on SK Gupta to see details) He is also a J. C. Bose Fellow of the Department of Biotechnology and an elected fellow of the National Academy of Medical Sciences. The Council of Scientific and Industrial Research, the apex agency of the Government of India for scientific research, awarded him the Shanti Swarup Bhatnagar Prize for Science and Technology, one of the highest Indian science awards for his contributions to Medical Sciences in 1997. (Note: Long link – please select award year to see details)

== Biography ==
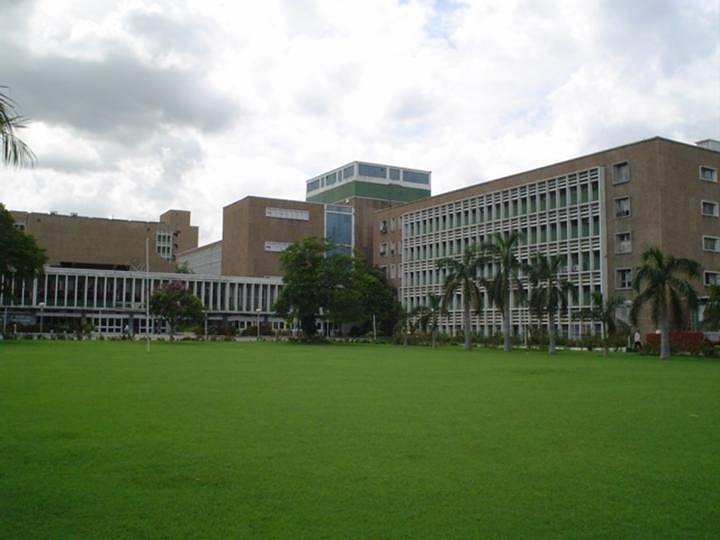
AIIMS, Delhi

Born on 20 April 1953 at Chhachhrauli in the Indian state of Haryana to Gur Prasad Gupta and Satya Rani, S. K. Gupta did his early college studies at the University of Delhi from where he earned his graduate degree (BSc). Moving to the All India Institute of Medical Sciences, Delhi, he completed his master's degree and started his career as a research officer at National Institute of Immunology, India which had only been established the previous year. During this period, he pursued his doctoral studies simultaneously at AIIMS and secured a PhD in 1983. At NII, he held various posts including that of the head of Gamete Antigen Laboratory and after superannuation, he serves as an emeritus scientist at the institution. In between, he served as a visiting faculty at several institutions abroad; Johns Hopkins University, Pasteur Institute, Laboratory of Molecular Biology, Wayne State University, Centers for Disease Control and Prevention and Hyogo College of Medicine featuring among them. He has also served as the principal investigator in a number of projects undertaken by the National Institute of Immunology.

Gupta is married to Rita and the couple has two sons, Ashish (married to Nidhi, blessed with 2 sons named Tanish and Aadish) and Manish (married to Ankita, blessed with a daughter named Anaisha. The family lives in Gurgaon.

== Career ==
Gupta's research covered the field of reproductive biology and he is known to have made studies on the effect of human hormones viz. Human chorionic gonadotropin and Gonadotropin-releasing hormone on reproductive functions. The team led by him has carried out elaborate investigations on Zona pellucida, a layer of glycoprotein enveloping the plasma membrane of mammalian oocytes and these studies have assisted in the efforts to develop immunocontraceptive protocols. Along with Gursaran Talwar, he pioneered Hybridoma technology in India and has designed diagnostic kits for HIV-1 and HIV-2 infections, Group A streptococcal infection and pregnancy detection. His research has been documented by way of several articles (Note: Please see Selected bibliography section) and his work has drawn many citations. Besides, he has published two texts on Immunology titled Reproductive Immunology and Immunology: Perspectives in Reproduction and Infection.

Gupta sat in the Scientific Advisory Committee of the Indian Council of Medical Research in 2005 and headed the Expert Group on Reproductive Health and Biologyof the Department of Biotechnology in 2013. He is a trustee of the Immunology Foundation, a member of the Indian Immunology Society and has been a member of the International Society for Immunology of Reproduction (1998–2004). His associations with international medical conferences include the VII International Congress of Reproductive Immunology held in New Delhi in October 1998 where he served as the convenor. He is a former member of the editorial boards of Reproductive Biomedicine Online, Journal of Reproductive Immunology and Reproductive Biology and Endocrinology and sits in the editorial boards of Indian Journal of Experimental Biology and Indian Journal of Medical Research.

== Awards and honors ==
Gupta received the Young Scientists Medal of the Indian National Science Academy in 1982 and the Shakuntala Amir Chand Prize of the Indian Council of Medical Research in 1984. A decade later, he received the 1994 VASVIK Industrial Research Award. The Council of Scientific and Industrial Research awarded him Shanti Swarup Bhatnagar Prize, one of the highest Indian science awards in 1997. He is also a recipient of the Population Control and Family Planning Award of Labhsetwar Foundation and the 2011 Ranbaxy Research Award. The National Academy of Medical Sciences elected him as a fellow in 1994 followed by the Indian Academy of Sciences in 1997. He became a fellow of the Indian National Science Academy in 2001 and the National Academy of Medical Sciences followed suit in 2005. The Award orations delivered by him include Smt. Swaran Kanta Dingley Oration of the Indian Council of Medical Research (1995) and Dr. Nitya Anand Endowment Lecture of Indian National Science Academy (2003). He also held the Tata Innovation Fellowship and the J. C. Bose Fellowship of the Department of Biotechnology during various tenures.

== Selected bibliography ==
- Gupta SK, Jethanandani P, Afzalpurkar A, Kaul R, Santhanam R (1997). "Prospects of zona pellucida glycoproteins as immunogens for contraceptive vaccine". Hum Reprod Update. 3 (4): 311–324. doi:10.1093/humupd/3.4.311. PMID 9459277.
- Satish K. Gupta, Villuppanoor A. Srinivasan, Pankaj Suman, Sriraman Rajan, Singanallur B. Nagendrakumar, Neha Gupta, Abhinav Shrestha, Pooja Joshi, Amulya K. Panda (2011). "Contraceptive Vaccines Based on the Zona Pellucida Glycoproteins for Dogs and Other Wildlife Population Management". Am J Reprod Immunol. 66 (1): 51–62. doi:10.1111/j.1600-0897.2011.01004.x. PMID 21501280.
- Nachiket Shembekar, Vamsee V. Aditya Mallajosyula, Arpita Mishra, Leena Yeolekar, Rajeev Dhere, Subhash Kapre, Raghavan Varadarajan, Satish Kumar Gupta (2013). "Isolation of a High Affinity Neutralizing Monoclonal Antibody against 2009 Pandemic H1N1 Virus That Binds at the 'Sa' Antigenic Site". PLOS ONE. 8 (1) e55516. Bibcode:2013PLoSO...855516S. doi:10.1371/journal.pone.0055516. PMC 3561186. PMID 23383214.
- Nutan, Manoj Modi, Tanvi Goel, Tiyasa Das, Shweta Malik, Samiksha Suri, Ajay Kumar Singh Rawat, Sharad Kumar Srivastava, Rakesh Tuli, Swadesh Malhotra, Satish Kumar Gupta (2013). "Ellagic acid & gallic acid from Lagerstroemia speciosa L. inhibit HIV-1 infection through inhibition of HIV-1 protease & reverse transcriptase activity". Indian J Med Res. 137 (3): 540–548. PMC 3705663. PMID 23640562.
