= Saroj Chooramani Gopal =

Indian medical doctor

- Born: 25 July 1944 (age 82); Mathura, Uttar Pradesh, India
- Education: Sarojini Naidu Medical College, All India Institute of Medical Sciences, New Delhi
- Occupations: Paediatric surgeon and academic
- Years active: Since 1973
- Awards: Padma Shri; Dr. B. C. Roy Award; Commonwealth Medical Scholarship; INSA Senior Fellowship; Indo German Fellowship; Indo Finnish Fellowship; University Grants Commission Fellowship; President's Medal; Shushila Nair Shield; Dr. Mridula Rohtagi Oration Award; Col. Sangam Lal Oration Award

Saroj Chooramani Gopal (born 25 July 1944) is an Indian medical doctor and medical educater. She was awarded the Padma Shri in 2013 for her contributions to the fields of medicine and medical education. She is the first woman to get an M.Ch. in Pediatric Surgery in the country.

== Biography ==
Scientific evidence has unequivocally established that tobacco consumption and exposure to tobacco smoke causes death, disease and disability. There is clear scientific evidence that prenatal exposure to tobacco smoke causes adverse health and developmental conditions for children. Secondhand smoke exposure causes heart disease and lung cancer in nonsmoking adults. Nonsmokers who are exposed to secondhand smoke at home or work increase their heart disease risk by 25–30% and their lung cancer risk by 20–30%.There is no risk-free level of secondhand smoke exposure. India enforced the ban on smoking in public places on 2 October 2008 and we must join hands to implement it effectively.says Dr. Saroj Gopal.

Saroj Chooramani Gopal was born on 25 July 1944, in the pilgrim city of Mathura, Uttar Pradesh, India. After schooling, she chose a career in medicine, graduated from the Sarojini Naidu Medical College, Agra in 1966 and did MS at the same college, in 1969. This was followed by securing MCh in paediatric surgery from the All India Institute of Medical Sciences, New Delhi, in 1973, the first woman to obtain a degree in paediatric surgery in India.

Saroj Gopal's career started by joining the faculty of the Institute of Medical Sciences, Banaras Hindu University in 1973 where she worked till her retirement in 2008 as the Medical Superintendent of the medical college hospital and as the Dean of the Faculty of Medicine. That year, she was selected as the Vice Chancellor of the King George's Medical University (KGMU), Lucknow, becoming the first woman to head the university which for a while during the reign of Mayawati, was under the name, the Chhatrapati Shahuji Maharaj Medical University. She retired from the university in 2011.

== Legacy ==
Saroj Chooramani Gopal is reported to have pioneered several techniques in paediatric surgery and is known for the developmental efforts put in by her during her tenure with KGMU, besides the many research articles she has published.

=== Scientific and administrative contributions ===
Gopal is credited with many low cost innovations intended to benefit the financially compromised people. The National Research Development Corporation, (NRDC) New Delhi have issued patents for six of those innovations to Saroj Gopal. She has also been reported to have invented new surgical techniques and she has published the details of three of such techniques. She helped establish a well equipped Department of Child and New Born Surgery at the Institute of Medical Sciences during her tenure at the institute. She has also organized many international symposia in paediatric surgery, has delivered key note addresses at a few of them and has participated in many social campaigns.

=== Publications ===
Gopal has published several articles, counted at 120, in peer-reviewed national and international journals. Some of her articles on hemangioma and teratoma have provided valuable insights on the treatment of the disease.

- Anand Pandey; Ajay Narayan Gangopadhyay; Saroj Chooramani Gopal; Vijayendra Kumar; Shiv Prasad Sharma; Dinesh Kumar Gupta; Chandrasen Kumar Sinha (2009). "Twenty years' experience of steroids in infantile hemangioma—a developing country's perspective". Journal of Pediatric Surgery. 44 (4): 688–694. doi:10.1016/j.jpedsurg.2008.10.038. PMID 19361627.
- Anand Pandey; Ajay Narayan Gangopadhyay; Shiv Prasad Sharma; Vijayendra Kumar; Saroj Chooramani Gopal; Dinesh Kumar Gupta (2009). "Conservative management of ulcerated haemangioma - twenty years experience". International Wound Journal. 6 (1): 59–62. doi:10.1111/j.1742-481x.2008.00562.x. PMC 7951731. PMID 19291117.
- Sunita Singh; Jiledar Rawat; Intezar Ahmed (2011). "Immature extragastric teratoma of infancy: a rare tumour with review of the literature". Case Reports. 2011.

== Positions ==
Saroj Gopal holds the position of the honorary Professor of the Centre of Biomedical Research. She was the President of the Indian Association of Pediatric Surgeons, in 1998, of which she is currently a member. She has been a member of the Expert Panel of the National Academy of Medical Sciences, New Delhi, an examiner with many universities and an inspector of the University Grants Commission. Currently she is the President of the National Academy of Medical Sciences, New Delhi.

She is also a member of professional bodies like the Association of Surgeons of India, the Indian Medical Association and the Indian Academy of Medical Sciences.

== Awards and recognitions ==
Saroj Gopal is a recipient of many honours such as:

- Commonwealth Medical Scholarship, 1984
- Senior Commonwealth Medical Scholarship, 1994
- INSA Senior Fellowship - Indian National Science Academy - 1994
- Indo German Fellowship - 1997
- Indo Finnish Fellowship - 1994
- University Grants Commission Fellowship
- National Academy of Medical Sciences Fellowship

The Government of India conferred the Dr. B. C. Roy Award on Gopal in 2002, and followed it up with the civilian award of the Padma Shri, in 2013. She has also received the President's Medal in 1966, Shushila Nair Shield for excellence in studies, Dr Mridula Rohtagi Oration Award of the Association of Pediatric Surgeons of India in 2005, Col. Sangam Lal Oration Award of Indian National Medical Academy in 2007.

== See also ==
- King George's Medical University
- Institute of Medical Sciences
