= Sujata Sharma =

Indian biophysicist

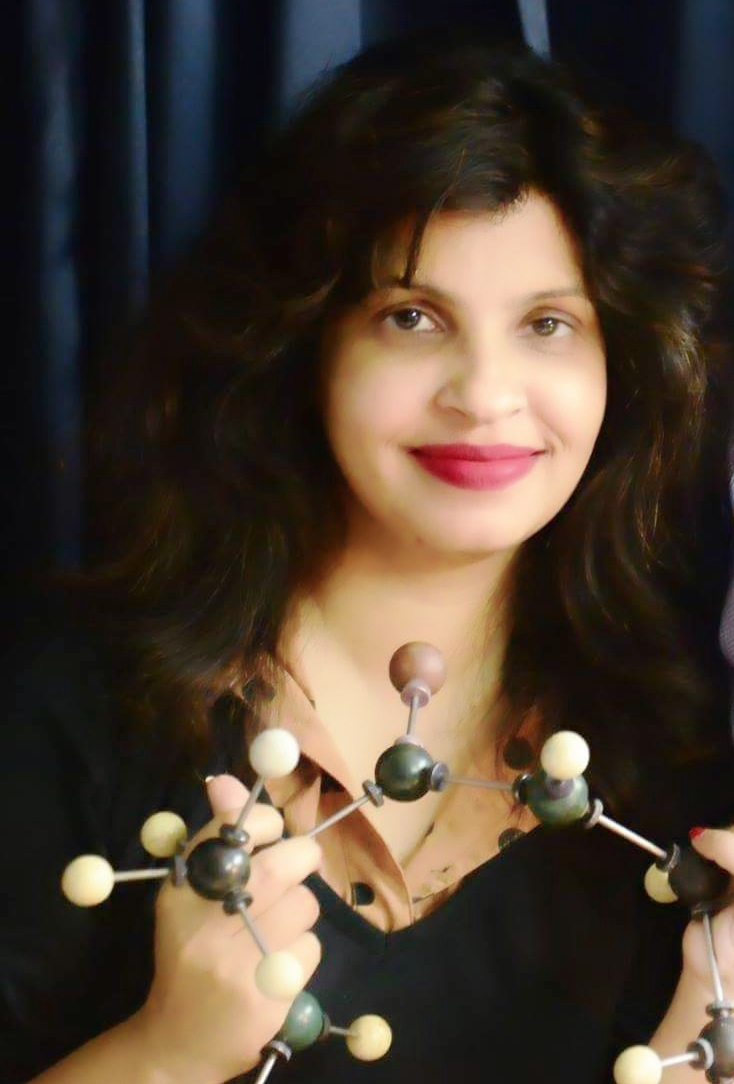
- Born: New Delhi, India
- Education: AIIMS Delhi
- Known for: Lactoferrin, Structure Based Drug Design Science Communication
- Spouse: Naval Kishore Vikram
- Children: Alma Vikram Sitab Vikram
- Awards: 2021 TWAS Regional Awards in Public Understanding and Popularization of Science; 2020 Kalpana Chawla Excellence Award; 2011 N-BIOS Prize; 2006 BRSI Woman Scientist Award; 2007 DBT National Woman Bioscientist Award
- Scientific career
- Fields: Biophysics
- Workplaces: AIIMS Delhi
- Doctoral advisor: Tej P Singh

Sujata Sharma is an Indian structural biologist, author, science communicator and professor in the Department of Biophysics at the All India Institute of Medical Sciences, New Delhi. Her research focuses on protein structure determination, structure-based drug design and antimicrobial therapeutics.

Sharma’s research integrates structural biology, molecular biology and translational medicine to develop novel antimicrobial strategies.

In addition to her research contributions, Sharma has been active in science communication and public engagement with science. She has authored books that explore science, medicine, and personal narratives from the perspective of a scientist.

== Early life and education ==
Sujata Sharma was born at the All India Institute of Medical Sciences, New Delhi. She is the daughter of the Hindi writer Maitreyi Pushpa and pharmacologist Dr. R. C. Sharma. She completed her schooling at Delhi Public School, R. K. Puram, New Delhi and joined the All India Institute of Medical Sciences, New Delhi as an undergraduate student.

Sharma later joined the same institution as a faculty member as an Assistant Professor. She currently serves as a Professor in the Department of Biophysics at the All India Institute of Medical Sciences, New Delhi.

== Contributions in structural biology ==
Sharma has made extensive contributions to the structural and functional characterization of lactoferrin and its derived fragments, exploring their roles in innate immunity, antimicrobial activity, and therapeutic applications.

She was the first structural biologist to successfully demonstrate the proteolytic C-terminal molecular half of lactoferrin (C-lobe) and determine its three-dimensional structure and studies examining the molecular mechanisms by which lactoferrin modulates oxidative stress and its potential role in modulating oxidative stress in inflammatory conditions. Sharma and collaborators have examined the antifungal activity of lactoferrin and its derived functional peptides against mucormycosis-causing fungi demonstrating that lactoferrin and its functional fragments may act as adjunct therapeutic agents and could contribute to the development of new strategies for the management of mucormycosis.

Her studies have established the fact that lactoferrin has a direct role in chelating the unbound non-steroidal anti-inflammatory drugs (NSAIDs) which in turn leads to the reduction in the NSAID-induced gastropathy.

The studies on the structure determination of Peptidoglycan Recognition Protein which is a component of the innate immune system and are conserved from insects to mammals, have given a new direction for the development of this protein as a natural protein antibiotic. The structural studies on the lactoperoxidase system, that is, lactoperoxidase along with its inorganic ion substrates, hydrogen peroxide, and oxidized products have given new insights into the structure-function interrelationships of this antimicrobial protein. Her structural studies on SPX-40 have demonstrated that the molecule acts as a protective signalling factor for breast cancer cells and have validated this protein as a drug target for breast cancer. She has also been involved in the designing of inhibitors, both small organic and inorganic compounds and peptides, against these protein targets. She has successfully demonstrated the potency of these ligands in several animal models.

== Awards and honours ==
- TWAS Regional Awards in Public Understanding and Popularization of Science in 2021
- Kalpana Chawla Excellence award in 2020
- National Bioscience Award for Career Development in 2011.
- National Young Woman Bioscientist Award of the Department of Biotechnology in 2007
- Woman Scientist Award of the Biotech Research Society of India in 2006

== Books ==
Sharma has also authored several books spanning science, medicine, and reflective narratives.

- A Dragonfly's Purpose ISBN 978-1-64650-765-8 Personal narrative in which Sharma reflects on illness, recovery, and the search for meaning through her experience with Guillain–Barré syndrome
- Conversations with Shambhu ISBN 978-81-973806-9-3 A reflective work exploring issues of mental health among teenagers and young adults through reflective conversations that address anxiety, self-doubt, identity, and emotional resilience.
- Kovi's Promise ISBN 979-8-88503-777-8 Children’s fantasy story set during the COVID-19 pandemic that promotes awareness about health, empathy, and responsible behaviour through the journey of a young character navigating an unusual and uncertain time.
- Tumhara Bholu – a Hindi work that explores human relationships and emotional bonds through storytelling.
- Warriors in White ISBN 978-1-63745-511-1 Collection of narratives highlighting the experiences and dedication of healthcare workers during COVID-19
- The Secret of the Red Crystals ISBN 978-1-947988-83-5 Memoir describing scientific discovery and research experiences at the All India Institute of Medical Sciences, New Delhi.`

== See also ==
- Lactoferrin
- Haem peroxidase
- Lactoperoxidase
