= Pushkar Sharma =

Pushkar Sharma may refer to:

- Pushkar Sharma (medical researcher)
- Pushkar Sharma (cricketer)
