= Gursaran Talwar =

Indian medical researcher

Gursaran Talwar FNA, FASc, FAMS
- Born: Gursaran Prasad Talwar; 2 October 1926 (age 99); Hissar, British India
- Education: Punjab University, Lahore (MSc); University of Paris (DSc)
- Known for: Discovery of Mycobacterium indicus pranii Development of the first leprosy vaccine Immunocontraception
- Awards: Legion of Honour (1991); Padma Bhusan (1992)
- Scientific career
- Fields: Biochemistry
- Workplaces: All India Institute of Medical Sciences; National Institute of Immunology; International Centre for Genetic Engineering and Biotechnology
- Doctoral advisor: Jacques Monod

Gursaran Prasad (Note: Also spelled "Prashad" (see INSA profile)) ("Pran") Talwar (born 2 October 1926) is an Indian medical researcher who is known for developing vaccines and immunocontraceptions. His discovery of a unique strain of bacterium, eponymously named Mycobacterium indicus pranii (MIP) led to the development of the first leprosy vaccine (commonly called MIP vaccine) in the world. He is most popularly known for founding the National Institute of Immunology, an autonomous research institute of the government of India, and the Talwar Foundation, a non-governmental organisation for continuing research in vaccines.

== Biography ==
Talwar was born in Hissar (now a city in Haryana state, India). At an early age, his family moved to Lahore (now capital of Pakistan), where he grew up and completed his school education. His original aim was to study medicine and become a physician, but his father suggested that he continued in basic science. He enrolled in the Government College, Lahore for BSc course. The college was at the time affiliated under Punjab University, Lahore (becoming an independent university as Government College University, Lahore in 1997). During his college days, Talwar was captain of the college rowing team and won all competitions he participated in, the most notable being the Harper-Nelson-Manmohan Boating Race Competition of 1938. After completing BSc with honours in chemistry, he entered the main Punjab University to study master's in chemical engineering.

Talwar's first year in the university was at the time of Indian independence for the British empire in 1947. The colonial India was separated into India and Pakistan, and the ensuing political and social turmoils in an event known as partition of India prompted millions of Indians to flee from the new country and settled in mass refugee camps in Delhi. It was from such a migrant camp that Talwar finished his final examinations and received MSc (Tech) degree from the Punjab University in 1948. In 1950, he received a scholarship for pursuing doctoral programmes in Europe, and chose France, as he later remarked, "because I had a leftist inclination … liberté, égalité, fraternité [the national motto of France]."

Talwar joined Pasteur Institute in Paris and for the doctoral degree he enrolled in the Sorbonne (the University of Paris). (Pasteur Institute does not award degrees and is affiliated with other universities for the degrees). He was initially assigned to fermentation section to study on yeasts for making champagne. He did not like it, saying, "The first time that I tasted champagne, I wondered why it was so special. It had no taste. I was not interested." He was transferred to biochemistry section under the supervision of Jacques Monod, who later received the Nobel Prize in Physiology or Medicine in 1965.

After receiving Doctor of Science degree from the Sorbonne, Talwar went to Germany as an Alexander von Humboldt Postdoctoral Fellow (from the Alexander von Humboldt Foundation) and worked at various universities including at Tübingen, Stuttgart and Munich. In 1956, he came across an advertisement for the establishment of All India Institute of Medical Sciences (AIIMS) in New Delhi. He joined as an associate professor of biochemistry (1956), and later became professor and head of the department till 1983. He was appointed Head of the Indian Council of Medical Research (ICMR)-World Health Organization (WHO) Research and Training Centre in Immunology for India and South East Asia between 1972 and 1991). In 1983, the government of India instituted the National Institute of Immunology (NII) appointing him as the founding director and retired from it as professor of eminence in 1994.

Immediately upon retirement from government service, Talwar was appointed professor of eminence and senior consultant at the International Centre for Genetic Engineering and Biotechnology (ICGEB), a project of the United Nations Industrial Development Organization (UNIDO) started in 1983. He worked there till 1999. Among honorary positions, Talwar was visiting professor at College de France (1991), Wellcome Professor at Johns Hopkins (1994–95), and distinguished professor at the Institute of Bioinformatics and Biotechnology and then at the University of Pune (2005–10).

In 1982, Talwar founded an independent research organisation, the Talwar Research Foundation in New Delhi. The Department of Scientific and Industrial Research (DSIR) of India officially approved it as Scientific and Industrial Research Organization (SIRO). Similar to Pasteur Institute, the foundation conducts research, especially in vaccine development, by which students can earn doctorates from affiliated universities. In 2000, he became its director.

In a 1994 paper, his group demonstrated that women could be vaccinated to prevent pregnancy.

== Awards and honours ==
- National Award in Bio-Medicine by the Indian Ministry of Health and Family Planning (1969)
- Elected fellow of the National Academy of Medical Sciences of India (1969), the Indian National Science Academy (1971), the Indian Academy of Sciences (1974)
- Sunder Lal Hora Medal by the Indian National Science Academy (1978)
- Legion of Honour (Officier de la Légion d'honneur), from the French government (1991)
- Indira Gandhi Priyadarshini Award (1994)
- Padma Bhusan, the third-highest civilian award of India (1992)
- Life Time Achievement Award by the Indian Immunology Society (1998)
- Mastroianni-Segal Award by the World Academy of Art and Science (1999)
- Elected president of the Indian Immunology Society (1973–77), the Endocrine Society of India (1978), the Indian College of Allergy and Applied Immunology (1979), the Association of Clinical Biochemists of India (1982), the Federation of Immunological Societies of Asia-Oceania (1992–95), the Indian Academy of Vaccinology and Immunobiology (1994–98), the International Society for Immunology of Reproduction (1995–98), and the 10th International Congress of Immunology (1998).
