= Master controversies =

2021 film controversy

The 2021 Indian film Master faced several controversies. Filming was disrupted by an income tax raid at the home of the film's lead actor Vijay and protests by the ruling Bharatiya Janata Party (BJP). The film, which was originally scheduled for release on 13 January 2021, was delayed by the COVID-19 lockdown. It was initially planned to be released with 100% seating capacity in theatres, following a personal request by Vijay to then Chief Minister Edappadi K. Palaniswami, and in line with other Tamil films. After protests from doctors and social activists, and the Central Government's decision against full occupancy in theatres, this plan was revoked and the film was released with 50% seating occupancy.

Unknown individuals pirated several scenes from the film before the theatrical release. On 29 January 2021, shortly after its run in theatres, the film was made available for streaming on Amazon Prime Video—16 days after its theatrical release— leading to criticism from theatre owners and exhibitors.

== Income tax raid ==
On 5 February 2020, the Income Tax Department raided the Chennai home of the film's lead actor Vijay, investigating potential tax evasion related to his investment in immovable properties inherited from the production studio AGS Entertainment, which bankrolled Bigil (2019). The investigation occurred while Vijay was shooting for Master in Neyveli, causing disruption to the project. Nearly ₹77 crore was seized from properties belonging to AGS Entertainment—the creative producer of Bigil, Archana Kalpathi, and film financer Anbu Cheliyan.

In March 2020, another raid occurred at the residence of the film's co-producer-and-distributor Lalit Kumar, and at his production house 7 Screen Studios, due to the film's pre-release business. Kumar had received a share of ₹50 crore from the film's ₹220 crore profit. (Note: This deal was finalised before COVID-19 lockdown and after the film's postponement to 13 January 2021, the deal was later revised to ₹158.3 crore.) On 13 March 2020, the IT department reported nothing significant was found during the raid and that Vijay had paid all due taxes. The Income Tax Department later released figures from the tax evasion probe showing Vijay received ₹50 crore for Bigil and ₹80 crore from Master. Member of Parliament Dayanidhi Maran accused the ruling Bharatiya Janata Party (BJP) of politically targeting Vijay through these IT raids because of his criticism of the party.

== Protests by Bharatiya Janata Party ==
On 7 February 2020, members of the BJP protested in front of a coal mine owned by Neyveli Lignite Corporation (NLC), where the film's final shooting schedule was being held. The party members protested against the NLC administration for granting permission for the shoot. Although the film crew had obtained permission for the shoot, the protesters said the area was highly secured and not suitable for a movie shoot, and they threatened to continue their protests if filming continued.

Later that day, fans of Vijay arrived and mounted a counter protest in support of the actor. Both groups of protesters dispersed after police intervention.

== Theatre seating capacity in Tamil Nadu ==
The Government of Tamil Nadu initially granted the makers of Master permission to release the film with 100% seating capacity in theatres, following a personal request from Vijay to Chief Minister Edappadi K. Palaniswami. This decision was made despite the rise in COVID-19 cases in India, particularly in Tamil Nadu.

Shortly thereafter, the Central Government of India issued a directive against the Tamil Nadu government's decision, stating 100% seating occupancy violated the guidelines of the Minister of Home Affairs, which permitted only 50% seat occupancy in theatres. Many doctors and social activists also protested against allowing 100% seating capacity. The Central Government's notice was upheld and the seating capacity in Tamil Nadu theatres was halved.

Prior to the issues regarding occupancy, exhibitors urged Vijay to reduce his salary for the film so the budget could be cut and the film would become more profitable for the distributors. Eventually, the distributors planned for Master to have a solo theatrical release in Tamil Nadu to maximise collections.

Tiruppur Subramanian, head of the Tamil Nadu Theatre Owners Association, said Master might receive priority in theatres if it was screened at 50% occupancy. After the film's theatrical release, more than 10 theatres in Chennai were fined for allowing full seat occupancy and violating COVID-19 safety precautions.

== Online piracy ==
On 12 January 2021, a day before Master's theatrical release, some scenes from the film were leaked on social media by anonymous individuals, triggering controversy within the film industry. Lokesh Kanagaraj and Malavika Mohanan urged the public not to share the leaked scenes and requested they watch the film in theatres while observing safety precautions. Many directors, producers, and actors from the South Indian film industry supported Lokesh on this issue.

The social media platform Twitter later assisted the production team to identify the source of the leak. It was revealed a person who worked for a digital company that had acquired the distribution rights abroad had allegedly stolen and leaked a copy of the film on the Internet.

== Early streaming release ==
Master began streaming on Amazon Prime Video from 29 January 2021, 16 days after its theatrical release; this was the shortest interval between cinematic and streaming releases for a Tamil film, a first for an Indian film. Xavier Britto said the film's early streaming release was due to it not being released in primary overseas centres. Theatre owners objected to the early streaming release, saying piracy websites would upload high-definition copies of the film, which could negatively affect its box-office collections.

Theatre owners demanded a 10% share from the theatrical screenings on Master but the film's producers proceeded with their streaming plans. Following the film's early streaming release, theatre owners announced that no film should premiere on a streaming service less than 30 days after its theatrical release. Despite this, theatre owners continued to screen the film due to fan demand and a lack of interest in films released after Master, which they attributed to poor content and ineffective promotional activities.

== Other issues ==
Three days of location filming for Master took place at a school for visually challenged children in Poonamallee, where the behaviour of the crew drew mixed reactions. Saravana Pandian, the school coordinator, was upset with Vijay for not meeting or interacting with the school's students as reported. He also criticized some crew members for smoking on the school premises, despite the presence of students.

The Chief Metropolitan Magistrate in Egmore directed the CB-CID to file a first information report (FIR) against producer Xavier Britto for copyright infringement. This court order resulted from a case filed by Novex Communications Private Limited, a music copyright company. According to the petitioner, some songs from Master were played at the film's audio launch on 15 March 2020 without obtaining copyright permission from Think Music, one of Novex's clients.

Film writer K. Rangadas filed a petition alleging plagiarism, saying Master's storyline is based on one of his works registered with the South Indian Film Writers Association in 2017.
