= Santosh Kumar Kacker =

Indian physician and medical researcher

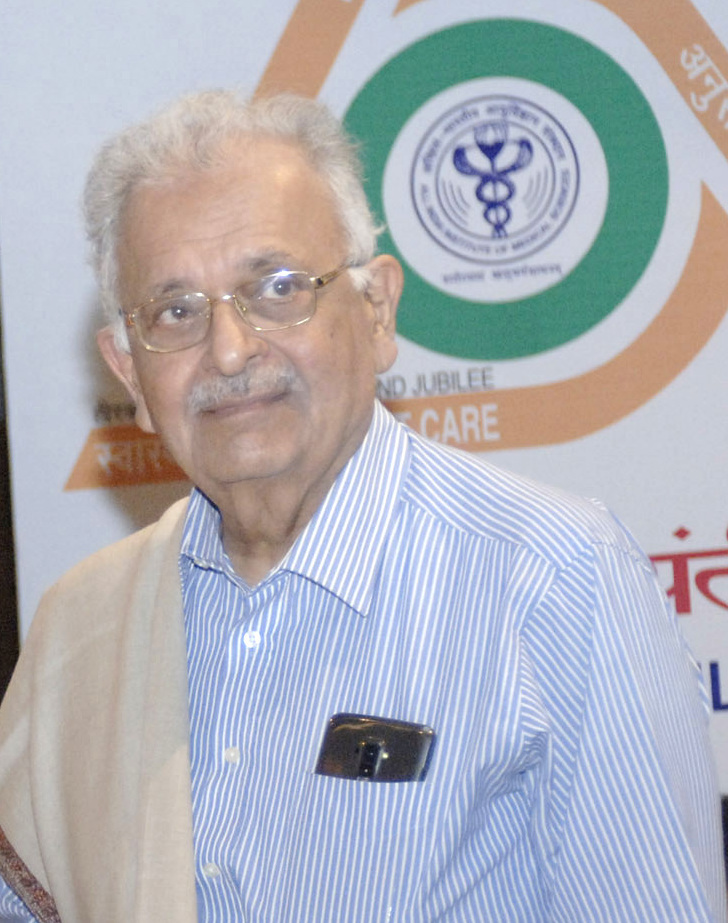
- Dr. Santosh Kumar Kacker receiving Lifetime achievement award.
- Born: India
- Occupation: Otorhynolaryngologist
- Years active: Since 1963
- Awards: Padma Shri

Santosh Kumar Kacker is an Indian otorhynolaryngologist and a former director of the All India Institute of Medical Sciences, Delhi. He graduated in medicine in 1960 and completed his post graduate degree (MS) in Otorhynolaryngology from the present day King George's Medical University, Lucknow, in 1963 to start his medical practice. He also secured the fellowship of the Royal College of Surgeons of London in 1968.

Kacker is a member of the expert panel of the Indian Council of Medical Research (ICMR) and the Association of the Otorhynolaryngologists of India. and chairs the Committee for developing aids for the Handicapped. A former honorary surgeon to the President of India, he has published his medical research findings as original research articles and medical papers in many peer reviewed journals. The Government of India awarded him the fourth highest Indian civilian honour of Padma Shri in 1986. Retiring from the post of the Senior Consultant at Sitaram Bhartia Institute of Science and Research, New Delhi, he continues his practice from home and attends to surgeries at charitable hospitals.
