= Daya Kishore Hazra =

Indian physician

- Born: Uttar Pradesh, India
- Education: Sarojini Naidu Medical College
- Occupation: Physician
- Awards: Padma Shri

Daya Kishore Hazra is an Indian medical doctor, known for his expertise in nuclear medicine and endocrinology. The Government of India honoured him, in 2014, with the award of Padma Shri, the fourth highest civilian award, for his contributions to the fields of medicine.

== Biography ==
Daya Kishore Hazra was born in Agra, Uttar Pradesh, India to Dr. J.N. Hazra, the eminent Homeopath who later became the Guru of the Radha Soami Sect and completed his primary studies from St. Peter's College, Agra it is ranked one of the oldest and best ICSE schools in India.He graduated in medicine from Sarojini Naidu Medical College, Agra. Later, he went to London for higher studies in endocrinology and nuclear medicine, returned to his alma mater, in 1970, to work there till 2000. This was followed by his stint with the Indian College of Physicians, where he worked as the Dean. His present profile is as the Head of Nuclear Medicine at the Boston Medical Centre, Agra. On his retirement from Sarojini Naidu Medical College, he was conferred the title of Professor Emeritus.

Hazra, considered by many as a pioneer of nuclear medicine in India, is best known for his contributions to radioimmunoassays and enzyme-linked immunosorbent assays. He is credited with pioneering contributions in the monitoring of hypothyroidism and in the analysis of triiodothyronine (T3) and Thyroid-stimulating hormone TSH hormones. He is reported to have developed T3 and TSH hormone tests and the technique to contain cancerous cells using isotopes, deploying a therapeutic protocol called radio-bioconjugate therapy. Reports confirm that these achievements assisted him to be shortlisted for the Nobel Prize for Physiology in 1977.

Hazra's studies on obesity and the effect of iodized salt are well documented. He asserted that iodized salt, contrary to popular belief, has an adverse effect on human physiology, especially in the care of women. One of the early Indian medical scientists in the area of evidence based endocrinology, Dr. Hazra pioneered the studies on small intestines functions in diabetes mellitus. He is a frequent speaker at various national and international seminars, and has published over 100 research papers in peer reviewed journals of repute. Microsoft Academic Search has listed 12 of his articles in their repository. A Random selection of his articles reads as:

- Daya Kishore Hazra (2003). "Patient safety during radiobioconjugate targeting". National Academy of Medical Sciences - CME Monograph. VI.
- Priyali Shaha; Anoop Misra; Nidhi Gupta; Daya Kishore Hazra; Rajeev Gupta; Payal Seth; Anand Agarwal; Arun Kumar Gupta; Arvind Jain; Atul Kulshreshta; Nandita Hazra; Padmamalika Khanna; Prasann Kumar Gangwar; Sunil Bansal; Pooja Tallikoti; Indu Mohana; Rooma Bhargava; Rekha Sharma; Seema Gulati; Swati Bharadwaj; Ravindra Mohan Pandey & Kashish Goel (April 2010). "Improvement in nutrition-related knowledge and behaviour of urban Asian Indian school children: findings from the 'Medical education for children/Adolescents for Realistic prevention of obesity and diabetes and for healthy aGeing' (MARG) intervention study". British Journal of Nutrition. 104 (3): 427–436. doi:10.1017/S0007114510000681. PMID 20370939.

Hazra, the president of the Nuclear Medicine Society and an elected fellow of the National Academy of Medical Sciences, also serves as the editorial board member of Diabetes India and is the life patron of Nimitt Matra Charitable Society.
