= B. N. B. Rao =

Indian surgeon, medical academic and writer

- Born: 21 January 1910; Channapatna, Ramanagara District, Karnataka, India
- Died: 7 March 1995 (aged 85); India
- Occupations: Surgeon; Medical academic Medical writer
- Years active: 1936–1995
- Known for: Medical academics Medical research
- Parent(s): B.K. Narayana Rao; Nacharamma
- Awards: Padma Shri

Basavapatna Narayana Balakrishna Rao (1910–1995) was an Indian surgeon, medical academic, researcher, writer and the president of the Association of Surgeons of India. He was a professor and head of the department of surgery at the All India Institute of Medical Sciences, New Delhi. One of the founder fellows of the National Academy of Medical Sciences, he was also an elected fellow of the Indian Academy of Sciences. The Government of India awarded him the fourth highest civilian honour of the Padma Shri, in 1971, for his contributions to medical science.

== Biography ==
Balakrishna Rao was born on 21 January 1910 at Channapatna, a town known as a manufacturing centre for lacquered wooden toys, in Ramanagara District of the south Indian state of Karnataka in a Sankethi Brahmin family to Nacharamma and Rajasevasakta Narayana Rao, an ophthalmologist and the founder of Minto Eye Hospital, who migrated to Mysore from Palakkad, Kerala. He did his early schooling in Mysore and after graduating in medicine from Mumbai University, he continued his medical studies in England to secure an LRCP, followed by MRCS in 1936. He also completed his FRCS there in 1937 before returning to India to join Mysore State Services as an assistant professor in 1940 and became a professor and head of the department of surgery at Mysore Medical College in 1945. After serving there for two years, he moved to Gajara Raja Medical College, Gwalior in 1947 and served as a professor, head of the department of surgery and a dean till 1964. His next move was to the All India Institute of Medical Sciences, Delhi where he continued till his superannuation in 1972, after which he served as a Scientist Emeritus of the Indian Council of Medical research till 1975. He also worked at Choithram Hospital and Research Centre, Indore, for two years from 1976 to 1978.

Rao, who was known to have researched on Neurosciences and Renal calculi, published many articles which included Primary carcinoma of the liver in infancy: report of a case, Active immunization against E. coli as a protective measure against haemorrhagic shock and Bilateral Prefrontal Leucotomy in Indian Patients. He served as the honorary surgeon to the President of India for a number of years and was the president of the Association of Surgeons of India (ASI) for two terms during 1962–63. He was one of the founders of the National Academy of Medical Sciences and is on the list of their founder fellows. The Indian Academy of Sciences elected him as their fellow in 1945 and the Government of India awarded him the civilian honor of the Padma Shri in 1971. He became a member of the International College of Surgeons in 1993 and, two years later, he died on 7 March 1995, at the age of 85. The Association of Surgeons of India instituted an annual award oration, Dr. Balakrishna Rao Oration, in 2000, in honor of its former president.
