= Sneh Bhargava =

Indian radiologist

Prof. Dr. Sneh Bhargava Padma Shri
- Born: 23 June 1930 (age 95); Ferozepur, Punjab, India
- Education: Lady Hardinge Medical College (MBBS); Imperial College School of Medicine (Fellowship in Diagnostic Radiology)
- Occupations: Radiologist; Medical academic
- Known for: Widespread availability of CT machines in India
- Notable work: The Woman Who Ran AlIMS: The Memoirs of a Medical Pioneer
- Title: Director, AIIMS New Delhi
- Term: 1984-1990
- Predecessor: Prof. (Dr.) H. D. Tandon
- Successor: Prof. (Dr.) S. K. Kacker
- Board member of: AIIMS New Delhi
- Honours: Padma Shri

Sneh Bhargava is an Indian radiologist, medical academic and a former director and Professor Emeritus of the All India Institute of Medical Sciences, New Delhi. Born in 1930, she is a former vice president and an elected Fellow of the National Academy of Sciences, India, one of the premier scientific societies in India. She has delivered several keynote addresses and has been part of medical ethics related investigations of the National Medical Commission. After superannuation from AIIMS, she works at Dharamshila Narayana Superspeciality Hospital in Mayur Vihar Phase 3, New Delhi. The Government of India awarded her the fourth highest civilian award of the Padma Shri, in 1991. She played a major role in the unsuccessful attempt to revive Indira Gandhi right after the latter's assassination attempt.

== See also ==
- All India Institute of Medical Sciences Delhi
- National Academy of Sciences, India
