= Meharban Singh =

Indian neonatologist

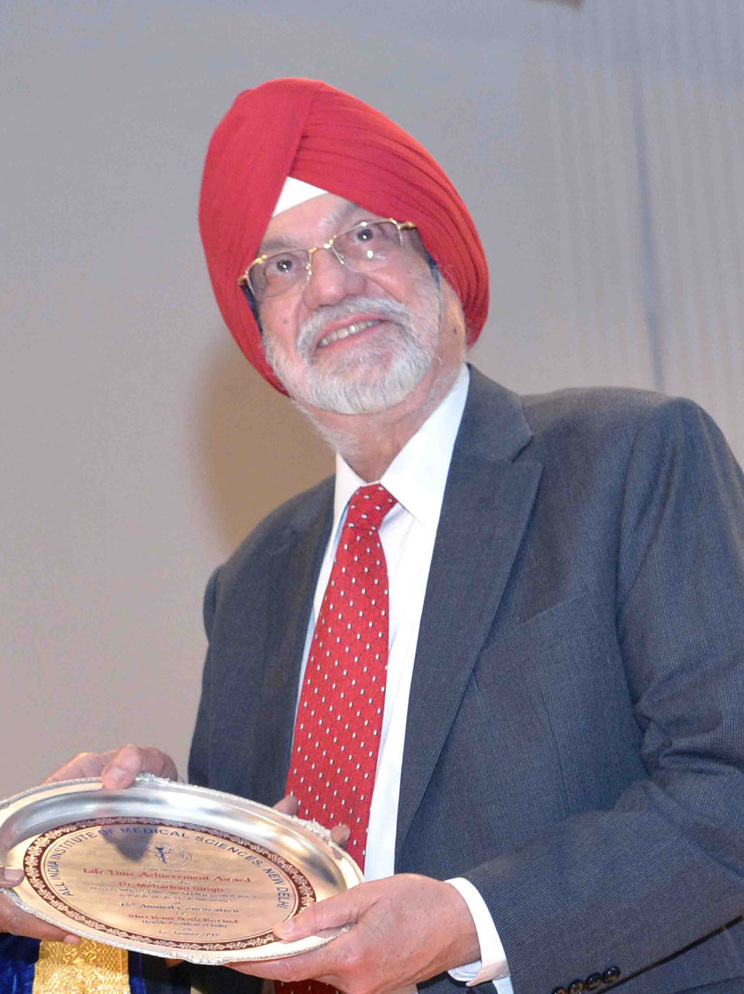
- Dr. Meharban Singh with Lifetime Achievement award.
- Born: 14 October 1937 (age 88); Rawalpindi, Punjab, British India
- Citizenship: India
- Scientific career
- Fields: Neonatology
- Institutions: All India Institute of Medical Sciences, New Delhi

Meharban Singh is an Indian pediatrician, neonatologist and medical writer, who has published on child care. He was WHO consultant on Newborn Care in South-East Asia for longtime. He has served for more than 3 decades in All India Institute of Medical Sciences, New Delhi. He was president of the Indian Academy of Pediatrics in 1993.

== Positions held ==
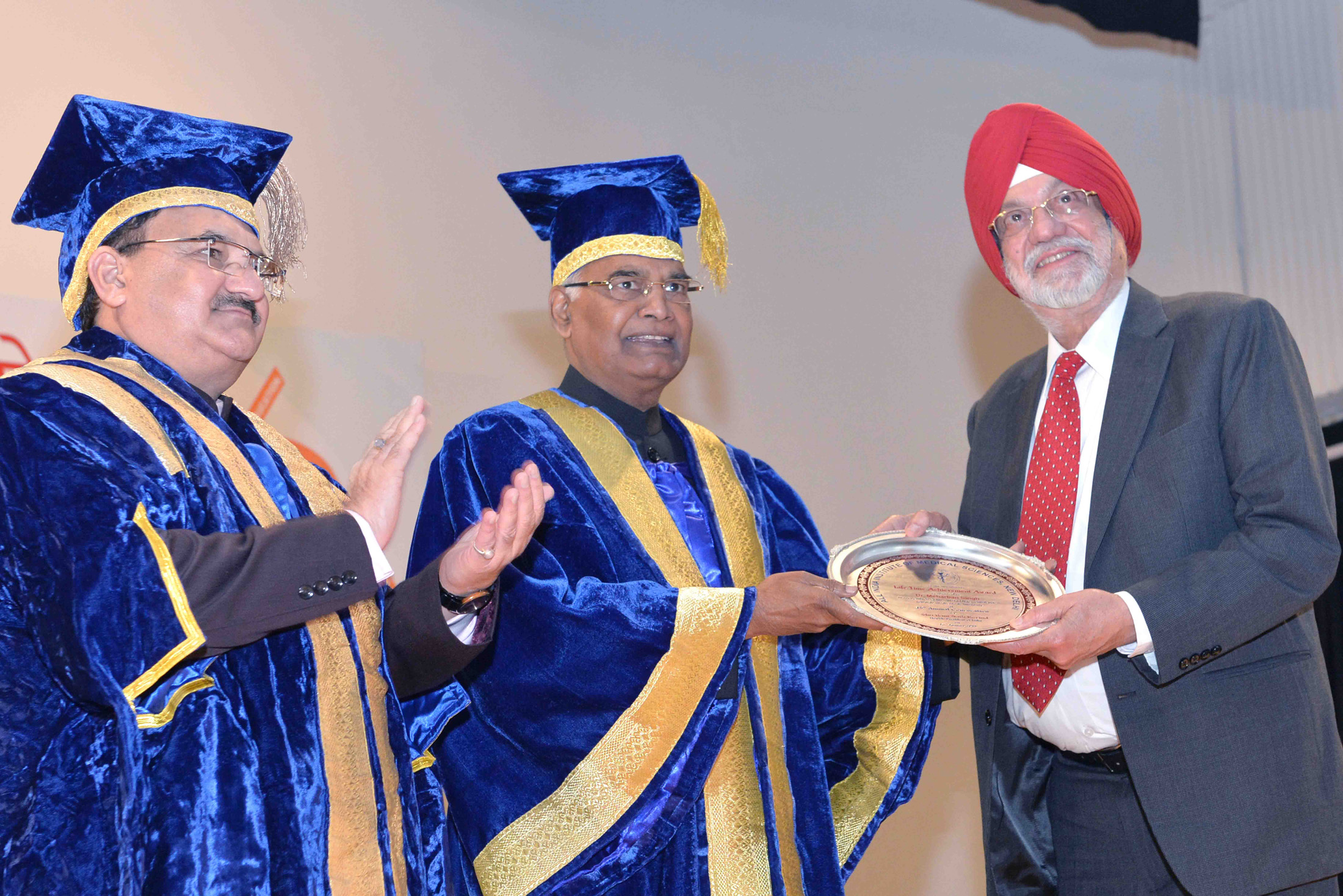
The President, Shri Ram Nath Kovind presenting lifetime achievement award, at the 45th Institute Annual Convocation of the All India Institute of Medical Sciences, at AIIMS, in New Delhi, in 2018.

Professor and Head, Department of Pediatrics and Neonatology Division, All India Institute of Medical Sciences, New Delhi. He has also been a visiting professor of pediatrics at various institutions.

Singh was formerly the director of the Indira Gandhi Institute of Child Health in Kabul, Afghanistan during 1979–83.

Secretary-General and President of the National Neonatology Forum of India and President of the Indian Academy of Pediatrics.

== Medical writer ==
He is a medical writer and teacher who has published 10 books on various aspects of Pediatrics and Neonatology, 40 chapters in Pediatric textbooks, 5 Monographs on various aspects of Neonatology, and over 325 research papers, reviews and editorials in National and International Medical Journals.

=== Books authored ===
- A Manual of Essential Pediatrics (Second edition, 2013), Theme medical and scientific publishers, Noida, (ISBN 978-93-82076-29-2).
- Care of the Newborn (Revised eighth edition, 2017), CBS publishers and distributors, New Delhi ( ISBN 978-81-239-2588-2)
- Drug Dosages in Children (along with Ashok K. Deorari, Tenth edition, 2019) CBS publishers and distributors, New Delhi (ISBN 9789388902663)
- Essential Pediatrics for Nurses (Third edition, 2014), CBS publishers and distributors, (ISBN 978-8123924489)
- Medical Emergencies in Children (Fifth edition, 2018), CBS publishers and distributors, (ISBN 978-8123928982)
- Medical Quotations (2009), Sagar publications, New Delhi (ISBN 978-8170820321)
- Pearls of Wisdom and Art of Living (2009), Sagar publications, New Delhi.
- Pediatric Clinical Methods (Fourth edition, 2011), Sagar publications, New Delhi. (ISBN 81-7082-060-X)
- The art and science of baby & child care : a complete book on parenting.
