= Ashok Kumar Hemal =

Indian urologist and academic

- Born: 5 September 1960 (age 65); India
- Education: Gajra Raja Medical College, Gwalior
- Occupations: Urologist, Robotic Surgeon
- Known for: Laparoscopy, Minimally invasive and Robotic surgery, Uro-oncology
- Awards: Padma Shri; UGC Outstanding Social Scientist Award

Ashok Kumar Hemal is a urologist and medical academic, known as the first surgeon to perform robotic surgery in India.

== Career ==
He is a former professor of the All India Institute of Medical Sciences, Delhi and is credited with efforts in establishing the department of robotic surgery at AIIMS where he has performed over 100 surgeries for cancer on kidney, prostate glands and urinary bladder. He has also served at Wake Forest Baptist Medical Center, Winston-Salem, as a professor and was a member of the team which developed teaching modules for the Centre for Medical Education Technology of AIIMS and Indira Gandhi National Open University. He has been involved in with many medical conferences and has published several medical articles; PubMed, an online repository of medical articles has listed 320 of them. Besides, he has authored a medical text book, Robotics in Urological Surgery, published by Springer Verlag. He is an elected fellow of the National Academy of Medical Sciences and a recipient of the 2005 Outstanding Social Scientist Award of the University Grants Commission. The Government of India awarded him the fourth highest civilian honour of the Padma Shri, in 2007, for his contributions to medical science.
