= Rakesh Yadav =

Indian cardiologist working at AIIMS New Delhi

- Born: Gaya district
- Title: Professor, doctor
- Awards: Dr. B. C. Roy Award (2014, awarded in 2017); Yash Bharti Award (2015)

Academic background
- Education: Sarojini Naidu Medical College (MD); All India Institute of Medical Sciences, New Delhi (DM)

Academic work
- Institutions: All India Institute of Medical Sciences, New Delhi

Rakesh Yadav is a cardiologist and a professor working at All India Institute of Medical Sciences, New Delhi.

== Early life and education ==
He was born in Gaya district of Bihar and moved to Gonda district of Uttar Pradesh during his childhood. He was U.P. Board (Board of High School and Intermediate Education Uttar Pradesh) topper in 10th standard (High School). He did his MD from Agra (Sarojini Naidu Medical College). After that he did DM in Cardiology from All India Institute of Medical Sciences, New Delhi.

== Career and achievements ==
He joined All India Institute of Medical Sciences, New Delhi in Cardiology department after getting his DM Cardiology degree and now working as a Professor there. In 2015, he was awarded Yash Bharti Award, the highest civilian award of Uttar Pradesh state. He was honoured with Dr. B. C. Roy Award as awardee for year 2014 in the award ceremony of 2017.
