= Sarojini Naidu Medical College =

Medical college in Agra, India

- Motto: LIVE TO SERVE
- Type: State Medical College
- Established: 1854; 172 years ago
- Academic affiliations: Atal Bihari Vajpayee Medical University
- Principal: Dr. Prashant Gupta
- Location: Agra, Uttar Pradesh, India; 27°11′13″N 78°00′23″E
- Campus: Urban
- Nickname: SNMC
- Website: www.snmcagra.ac.in

Sarojini Naidu Medical College (SNMC) is one of the oldest medical schools of India. It is located in Agra, Uttar Pradesh state. It is named after the first female Governor of the United Provinces, poet and freedom fighter, Bharat Kokila Smt. Sarojini Naidu. The college has the hospital attached to it named Sarojini Naidu Hospital.

== History ==
In 1854, during the British Empire's government, the medical college was founded for the practice of British military doctors. The name of S N Medical College was originally Thomason Hospital, named after Lt. Governor Sir James Thomason, founder of the college. Plans for establishing the school were made by the British East India Company; the maintenance cost was also borne by it. The hospital attached to the Medical School was known as the Thompson Hospital.

In 1857 the first batch of Indian doctors was passed out from Thomson School. Surgeon John Murray was the first principal of the school, from 1854 until 1858. From 1872 onwards civilian students were also admitted to the L.M.P. course, which was later changed into L.S.M.F. by the Uttar Pradesh State Medical Faculty. In 1883 Lady Lyall Duuerin Hospital was founded as a separate section for the medical training of female students. The first batch of female doctors was passed out in 1886.

In 1939 Agra Medical School was upgraded as a full fledged medical college to meet the growing demand for doctors in United Provinces. The first batch of M.B.B.S. was graduated in 1944, with the degree awarded by Agra University. In 1947 the name of the medical school was changed to Sarojini Naidu Medical College after the name of the first Lady Governess of Uttar Pradesh, the poet and freedom fighter, Bharat Kokila. At the same time the Thomson Hospital was also renamed Sarojini Naidu Hospital. In 1948 the S N Medical College was recognized by the Medical Council of India and the General Medical Council of Great Britain.

== Courses ==
Undergraduate courses MBBS (medical school degree, equivalent to Doctor of Medicine or MD in some countries)

Postgraduate courses

- MS - Human Anatomy, Obstetrics & Gynecology, Ophthalmology, Orthopedics, Surgery
- MD - Forensic Medicine, Pharmacology, Human Physiology, Microbiology, Pathology, SPM, Anesthesiology, Skin and VD, Medicine, Pediatrics, Radio Diagnosis, Psychiatry, Radiotherapy, Pulmonary Medicine.

Postgraduate Diplomas - Pharmacy, Obstetrics & Gynecology, Pediatrics, ENT, Ophthalmology, Radio diagnosis, Psychiatry, Radiotherapy, Pulmonary Medicine

== Admissions ==
Entry to this institute is highly competitive, with admission offered to less than the top 1% of applicants. The medical college entrance examination for SNMC is through NEET exam in India.

== Upgradation ==
In August 2014, the Government of India has decided to upgrade the institute on lines of All India Institute of Medical Sciences as part of phase-3 of Pradhan Mantri Swasthya Suraksha Yojana (PMSSY) whereby the Central Government will bear 80% of the cost of up gradation and 20% cost will be borne by State Government.

== Notable alumni ==
- Javed Agrewala
- Saroj Chooramani Gopal
- Om Dutt Gulati
- Daya Kishore Hazra
- Lalit Kumar
- Jai Pal Singh
- Mukesh Verma
- Rakesh Yadav
- Ramakant Yadav

== Notable Staff ==
- Sir Alexander Christison Principal from 1865 to 1882
