= Javed Agrewala =

Indian immunologist (born 1961)

- Born: 14 May 1961 (age 64); Agra, Uttar Pradesh, India
- Education: Dr. Bhimrao Ambedkar University, Sarojini Naidu Medical College
- Known for: Studies on Tuberculosis
- Awards: 2005 Shanti Swarup Bhatnagar Prize; 2006 N-Bios Prize; New Idea Research Talent Award
- Scientific career
- Fields: Immunology
- Institutions: Indian Institute of Technology Ropar; Institute of Microbial Technology; Royal Postgraduate Medical School; Trudeau Institute

Javed Naim Agrewala (born 14 May 1961) is an Indian immunologist, the prof. at Indian Institute of Technology Ropar and the chief scientist and professor at the Institute of Microbial Technology, Chandigarh. Known for his research on Tuberculosis, Agrewala is an elected fellow of all the three major Indian science academies viz. National Academy of Sciences, India, Indian National Science Academy and Indian Academy of Sciences. The Council of Scientific and Industrial Research, the apex agency of the Government of India for scientific research, awarded him the Shanti Swarup Bhatnagar Prize for Science and Technology, one of the highest Indian science awards for his contributions to Medical Sciences in 2005. (Note: Long link – please select award year to see details) He is also a recipient of the National Bioscience Award for Career Development of the Department of Biotechnology.

== Biography ==
Javed N. Agrewala, born on 14 May 1961 in Agra in the Indian state of Uttar Pradesh, graduated in science from Dr. Bhimrao Ambedkar University in 1980 and earned a master's degree from the same institution in 1982 after which he did his doctoral studies at Sarojini Naidu Medical College to secure a PhD in 1986.

== Awards and honors ==
A Biotechnology Overseas Associate of the Department of Biotechnology and a member of the American Association of Immunologists, Agrewala was elected as a fellow of the National Academy of Sciences, India in 2004. The Council of Scientific and Industrial Research awarded him Shanti Swarup Bhatnagar Prize, one of the highest Indian science awards in 2005. and he received the National Bioscience Award for Career Development of the Department of Biotechnology in 2006. He became an elected fellow of the Indian National Science Academy in 2010 and the Indian Academy of Sciences in 2015. He also is a recipient of the New Idea Research Talent Award of the Council of Scientific and Industrial Research.
