= National Institute of Immunology, India =

Indian government biomedical research centre

National Institute of Immunology

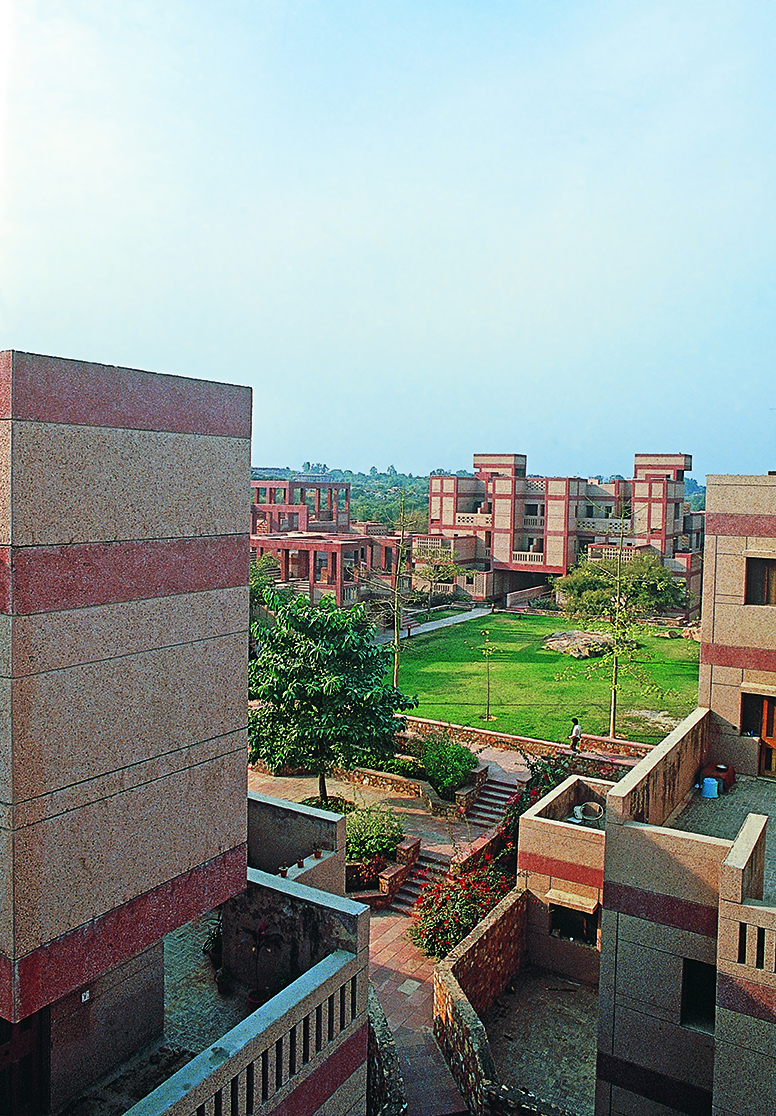

Agency overview
- Formed: 24, June 1981
- Jurisdiction: Government of India
- Headquarters: New Delhi
- Agency executive: Dr. Debasisa Mohanty, Director
- Parent department: Department of Biotechnology
- Website: www.nii.res.in

National Institute of Immunology (NII) is an autonomous research institute located in New Delhi, under the Department of Biotechnology (DBT) for research in immunology.

NII was established on 24 June 1981, with M. G. K. Menon as chairman of its governing body. It has its origins in the ICMR–WHO Research & Training Centre in Immunology at the All India Institute of Medical Sciences (AIIMS), Delhi, which was merged with NII in 1982. However, NII continued to function from AIIMS laboratory of its honorary director G.P. Talwar, till its new building was constructed in 1983, carved out of the Jawaharlal Nehru University (JNU) campus. G.P. Talwar is the founder director of this institute. A first of its kind vaccine for leprosy in India was developed by NII and it was named as mycobacterium indicus pranii.
