= Jai Pal Singh =

Indian physician and surgeon (born 1930)

Dr Jai Pal Singh
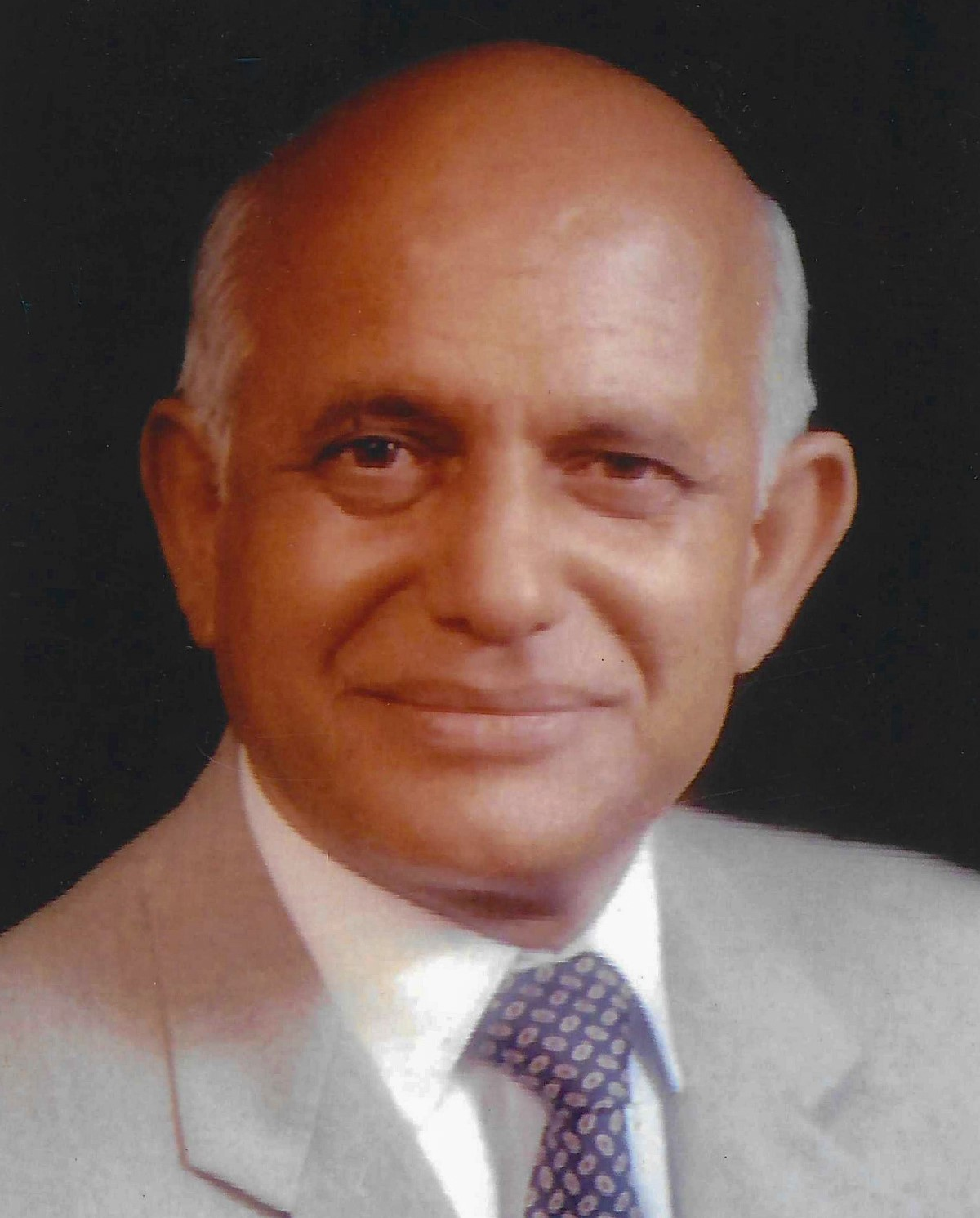
- Singh in 1987

Director of PGIMS, Rohtak
- In office 1989–1992

Medical Superintendent, Dr RML Hospital, New Delhi
- In office 1986–1989

Head of Department, UCMS, New Delhi
- In office 1980–1986
- Department: Surgery

Personal details
- Born: 13 May 1930 Mhow, Indore district, Madhya Pradesh
- Died: 24 September 1997 (aged 67) Delhi, India
- Spouse: Vedvati
- Education: Bachelor of Medicine, Bachelor of Surgery; General Surgery
- Alma mater: Sarojini Naidu Medical College, Agra
- Profession: Surgeon; Professor
- Awards: Padma Shri (1991)

Jai Pal Singh (13 May 1930 – 24 September 1997) was an Indian physician, surgeon, and educator. He made contributions to medical science and education in India, particularly in the fields of surgery and medical administration. He was honoured with the Hari Om Ashram Prerit Award in 1986 and the Padma Shri award presented by the President of India in 1991.

== Early life and education ==
Singh was born on 13 May 1930 in Mhow, Indore district, Madhya Pradesh. He pursued his Bachelor of Medicine, Bachelor of Surgery at Sarojini Naidu Medical College, Agra, in 1952. He completed his post-graduate qualifications in surgery in 1955 from Sarojini Naidu Medical College, Agra. His father, Dr. Yogendra Singh, was also a doctor who served in the British Army.

== Career ==
Singh’s career spanned over four decades, during which he held several prestigious positions. He began his career as a Clinical Tutor at Sarojini Naidu Medical College, Agra, and later served as a registrar in surgery at Lady Irwin Hospital, New Delhi. He was appointed as an honorary assistant professor of surgery at Lady Hardinge Medical College and The Willingdon Hospital, New Delhi, where he supervised Master of Surgery students.

From 1980 to 1986, Singh was a professor and head of the department of surgery at the University College of Medical Sciences, University of Delhi. He also served as the medical superintendent of Dr. Ram Manohar Lohia Hospital, New Delhi, from 1986 to 1989. His last official position was as the director of Rohtak Medical College & Hospital (now Pt. B. D. Sharma PGIMS Rohtak) in Haryana from 1989 to 1992.

Singh was recognised for his work in surgery and was appointed as honorary surgeon to two presidents of India. He made significant contributions to surgical science, particularly in the areas of childhood burns, hernia, surgical nutrition, and kidney stones. His research on amoebic liver abscess was published in The American Journal of Surgery.

== Research ==
Singh was a surgeon and medical researcher who over the course of 25 years published numerous articles in international journals. He conducted research and published in the areas of general surgery, pediatric surgery, oncology, and urology. He gained recognition in Indian surgery for his work on childhood burn hernias, surgical nutrition, a novel rectum prolapse procedure, kidney stone research, and large intestine motility investigations. In 1990, an editorial in the British Journal of Surgery referenced his research on amoebic liver abscess, which was published in The American Journal of Surgery.

== Awards ==
In 1986, he was awarded the Hari Om Ashram Prerit Award for his research on urinary calculi. In 1991, he was honoured with the Padma Shri, India’s fourth highest civilian award by the President of India.

== Personal life ==
Singh married Vedwati, the daughter of Chaudhary Charan Singh, 5th Prime Minister of India. Singh died on 24 September 1997 in Delhi, India.
