= Bhalchandra Babaji Dikshit =

Indian physician

Bhalchandra Babaji Dikshit FRCP
- Born: 7 September 1902; Amravati
- Died: 1977 (aged 74–75)
- Education: University of Bombay (M.B.B.S); University of Calcutta (D.P.H); University of Edinburgh (Ph.D)
- Known for: First Director of AIIMS, New Delhi
- Awards: Padma Bhushan (1965)

Bhalchandra Babaji Dikshit (7 September 1902 - 1977) was an Indian physician and pharmacologist. He was the first director of AIIMS, New Delhi. He obtained an M.B.B.S. in 1925 from Bombay University and a D.P.H. from Calcutta University in 1925. He gained both an M.R.C.P.E. in 1933 and a Ph.D. in 1934 from the University of Edinburgh.

He was awarded the Padma Bhushan, third highest civilian honour of India by the President of India, in 1965.
