= Subrat Kumar Panda =

Indian virologist

- Born: 1 June 1983 (age 43); Odisha, India
- Education: Utkal University; AIIMS Delhi; London School of Hygiene & Tropical Medicine
- Known for: Studies on Viral hepatitis
- Awards: 1995 Shanti Swarup Bhatnagar Prize
- Scientific career
- Fields: Virology
- Workplaces: AIIMS Delhi
- Doctoral advisor: Arie Zuckerman

Subrat Kumar Panda (born 1954) is an Indian virologist, professor and Head Department of Pathology at All India Institute of Medical Sciences, Delhi. Known for his researches in viral hepatitis, Panda is an elected fellow of the Indian Academy of Sciences, Indian National Science Academy (Note: Long link - please select P and click on SK Panda to see details) and the National Academy of Medical Sciences. The Council of Scientific and Industrial Research, the apex agency of the Government of India for scientific research, awarded him the Shanti Swarup Bhatnagar Prize for Science and Technology, one of the highest Indian science awards for his contributions to Medical Sciences in 1995. (Note: Long link - please select award year to see details)

== Biography ==
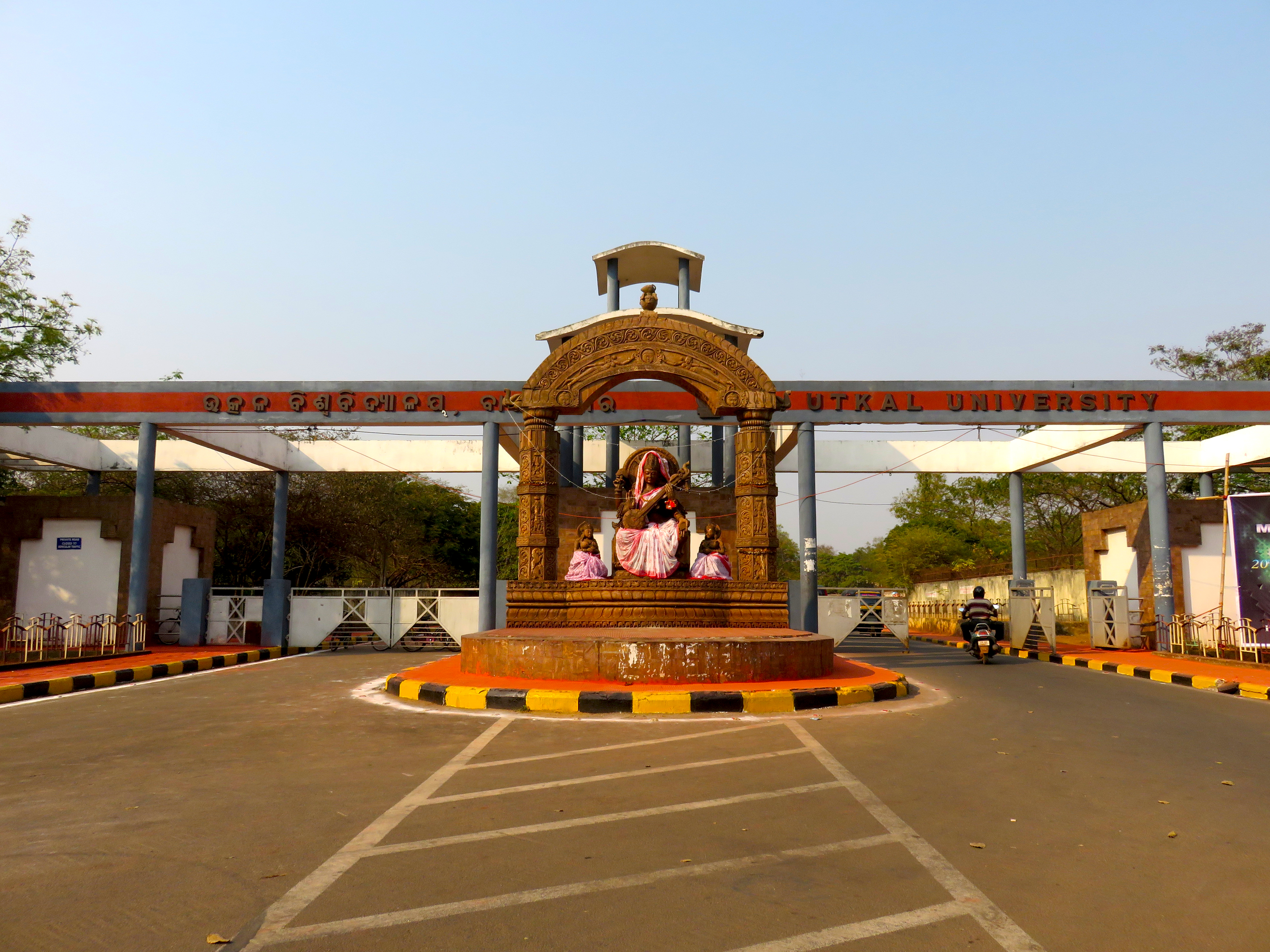
Utkal University

Born on 18 November 1954 in the Indian state of Odisha, S. K. Panda graduated in medicine from SCB Medical College, Cuttack in 1977 and earned an MD from the All India Institute of Medical Sciences, Delhi in 1981. Subsequently, he moved to the UK where he did his post-doctoral studies at the laboratory of Arie Zuckerman of London School of Tropical Medicine which he completed in 1987. Returning to India, he joined AIIMS Delhi as a member of faculty at the department of pathology and serves as the professor and head of the department.

Panda is married to Gita Satpathy, a professor of microbiology at AIIMS, Delhi and the family lives in AIIMS campus.

== Legacy ==
Panda, whose researches covered the fields of Molecular Virology and Liver Pathology, is known to have contributed to the wider understanding of viral hepatitis. He carried out extensive researches on various types of hepatitis virus such a B, C and E and elucidated the replication and transcription processes of Hepatitis E virus. These studies, based on Rhesus monkeys, demonstrated the relationship of the virus with liver diseases and protracted viremia. His researches have been documented by way of several articles; (Note: Please see Selected bibliography section) and online article repositories like Google Scholar and ResearchGate have listed a number of them.

== Awards and honors ==
The Council of Scientific and Industrial Research awarded him Shanti Swarup Bhatnagar Prize, one of the highest Indian science awards in 1995. Indian Academy of Sciences elected him as a fellow the same year, followed by the National Academy of Medical Sciences and the Indian National Science Academy in 2010.

== Selected bibliography ==
- Hazari, Sidhartha; Panda, Subrat Kumar; Datta Gupta, Siddharth; Batra, Yogesh; Singh, Rajbir; Acharya, Subrat Kumar (2004). "Treatment of hepatitis C virus infection in patients of northern India". Journal of Gastroenterology and Hepatology. 19 (9): 1058–1065. doi:10.1111/j.1440-1746.2004.03405.x. PMID 15304125. S2CID 21140515.
- Sengupta, Sonali; Rehman, Shagufta; Durgapal, Hemlata; Acharya, Subrat Kumar; Panda, Subrat Kumar (2007). "Role of surface promoter mutations in hepatitis B surface antigen production and secretion in occult hepatitis B virus infection". Journal of Medical Virology. 79 (3): 220–228. doi:10.1002/jmv.20790. PMID 17245717. S2CID 25783893.
- Bhatia, Vikram; Singhal, Amit; Panda, Subrat Kumar; Acharya, Subrat Kumar (2008). "A 20-year single-center experience with acute liver failure during pregnancy: is the prognosis really worse?". Hepatology. 48 (5): 1577–1585. doi:10.1002/hep.22493. PMID 18925633. S2CID 9830303.
- Kumar, Amit; Panda, Subrat Kumar; Durgapal, Hemlata; Acharya, Subrat Kumar; Rehman, Shagufta; Kar, Upendra K. (2010). "Inhibition of Hepatitis E virus replication using short hairpin RNA (shRNA)". Antiviral Research. 85 (3): 541–550. doi:10.1016/j.antiviral.2010.01.005. PMID 20105445.
- Prabhu, S. B.; Gupta, P.; Durgapal, H.; Rath, S.; Gupta, S. D.; Acharya, S. K.; Panda, Subrat Kumar (2010). "Study of cellular immune response against Hepatitis E Virus (HEV)". Journal of Viral Hepatitis. 18 (8): 587–594. doi:10.1111/j.1365-2893.2010.01338.x. PMID 20579277. S2CID 45382363.

== See also ==
- Herpes simplex
