= National Medical Library =

Indian medical library established in 1966

Coordinates: 28.5682°N 77.2155°E

The National Medical Library is a medical library established on 1 April 1966 by the Government of India. It is located in Ansari Nagar, New Delhi. It aims to provide library and information services to the health science professionals in India. It functions under the administrative control of the Directorate General of Health Services.

The library has 3.6 lakh volumes of books, reports, bound volumes of journals and other literature. It subscribes to around 2000 periodicals annually. The library has a good collection of 19th century literature. Books are classified according to the Dewey Decimal Classification. The library became the Indian focal point of HELLIS Network under World Health Organization in 1982.

The library has been organizing training programmes for medical/health science librarians since 1980. It has organized 17 Orientation Courses in Health Science Librarianship and trained over 150 librarians in India. It has also conducted training courses on specific topics like MEDLARS searching, computer applications, Library management, softwareIndexing and abstracting in different regions. A national Workshop was held in 1997 to evaluate these courses.

Any qualified medical person, student or faculty can becone a member of the library and use its services. One can also obtain a photocopy of any article by post, by paying a nominal fee.
