= Pradeep Seth =

Indian virologist

Pradeep Seth is an Indian virologist who injected himself in 2003 with a potential vaccine he had developed for HIV. He has been working in the field of virology since 1968 and is an elected fellow of the National Academy of Medical Sciences,

He did his MBBS and Masters (MD) in Microbiology from AIIMS in 1970 and then taught at the same institute till 2005. He holds 4 Indian Patent and 4 International Patent in the field of Virology. In 1986, he was awarded the Shanti Swarup Bhatnagar Prize for his contribution in Medical Sciences.
