= Sathyanarayana Srikanta =

Indian endocrinologist

Dr. Sathyanarayana Srikanta
- Citizenship: India
- Education: All India Institute of Medical Sciences
- Scientific career
- Workplaces: Harvard Medical School

Dr. Sathyanarayana Srikanta is an endocrinologist and researcher in the field of endocrinology. Since 1993 he is serving as the medical director at Samatvam Endocrinology Diabetes Center and Jnana Sanjeevini Medical Center in Bangalore, India. He became faculty at the Harvard Medical School and Clinical Investigator of National Institute of Health, USA at the age of 29 years.

== Education ==
Srikanta completed his MD in internal medicine from All India Institute of Medical Sciences, New Delhi, India. After this he was a fellow, faculty, and investigator for endocrinology, diabetes, and metabolism at Harvard Medical School, Brigham and Women's Hospital, and the Joslin Diabetes Center, US. He is also a Fellow at American College of Endocrinology.

== Public life ==
Dr. Srikanta has been a committed social worker by serving the poor and needy in India through his active contributions over the past three decades at Samatvam Trust. Samatvam's programs are DISHA -supporting children and youth with Type1 Diabetes, DOSTI - for adults with Type2 Diabetes and DEEPA.
