= Pramod Kumar Julka =

Indian oncologist

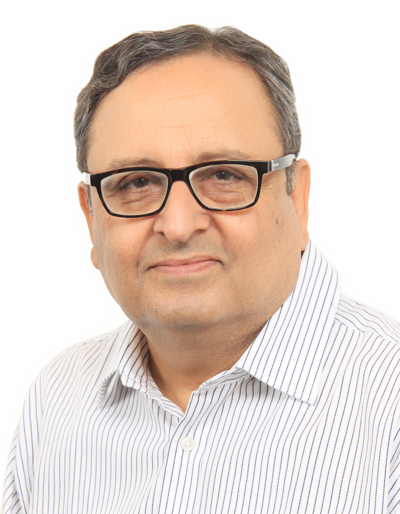
- Born: India
- Occupation(s): Cancer Specialist, Cancer Treatment
- Awards: Padma Shri; P. K. Haldar Oration Award; IMA Award; Dr. G.D. Pandey Oration Award; NDB Oration Award; Leading Scientist of the World Award; OISCA Foundation Award; IMA Gold Medal

Pramod Kumar Julka, is an Indian cancer specialist (oncologist), medical educationist and writer, known for performing the first peripheral blood stem cell transplant following high dose chemotherapy in Metastatic Breast Cancer in India. He was honoured by the Government of India, in 2013, by bestowing on him the Padma Shri, the fourth highest civilian award, for his contributions to the fields of medicine and medical education. The American Society of Clinical Oncology (ASCO) has awarded him by bestowing on him the honorary membership.

== Biography ==
About 70% of cancer cases reach hospitals in Stage Three or Four and only 30% come in Stage One or Two. It obviously affects the cure rate. In our cancer centre, we get 15,000 new cancer cases every year, says Dr. Pramod Kumar Julka.

Pramod Kumar Julka, a Delhiite, graduated in medicine and did MD in Radiotherapy from the Maulana Azad Medical College, New Delhi, in 1979. He has also had higher training at the M. D. Anderson Hospital, Houston, Texas, under World Health Organization fellowship and thereafter at the Long Beach Memorial Cancer Centre, Long Beach, California. He joined the All India Institute of Medical Sciences, New Delhi in the year 1984 and has served there as Dean-Academics and Professor of the Department of Radiotherapy and Oncology till the year 2016. He is presently working as Director-Oncology Daycare Centre at Max Healthcare. He has done extensive research in clinical oncology, radiation biology and chemotherapy.

With more than three decades of experience in cancer treatment and research and credited with major breakthroughs, he has treated cancer patients from all segments of the society without any discrimination. Hundreds of patients- throng through the congested corridors of the hospital, to find Dr. Julka welcoming them and patiently treating them of this dreadful disease. The only thing as relentless as cancer is his commitment and dedication to fight it which he instills into all his patients.

Julka has a fond attachment to academics. He has taught graduate, postgraduate and doctoral students at All India Institute of Medical Sciences. He works closely with Govt. of India and has been appointed by Ministry of Health and Family Welfare to inspect cancer centers across the country under the National Cancer Control Programme. He served as a member of Specialty Board (National Board of Examination) to form curriculum for DNB-RT in the country. He has also served as a member of Doctoral Committee for Ph.D (Radiotherapy) and an expert for the selection of Professors, Readers and Lecturers at various cancer hospitals across the country. He is the Nominated member for the Academic Council of Guru Gobind Singh Indraprastha University (GGSIPU, Delhi) and Chairman (imaging and radiotherapy) for Bureau of Indian Standards (BIS).

An active participant in TV and Radio programs on cancer, Julka has conducted a series of talks on “Early Detection of Cancer and its Management” on National Network of Doordarshan since 1980. He has answered public’s and patient’s queries in various Phone-in-Programmes at All India Radio and DD News such as “Cancer in Females”, “Smoking and Cancer”, “Cell Phones and Cancer” etc. As a true Samaritan, he is always more than willing to lend his services in communicating the message to the viewers. Revered by a large number of media houses and publications, he educates the public through apt use of mass media such as newspapers and magazines.

Julka has published many articles, over 250 of them, in national and international peer reviewed journals that has benefited eminent researchers across the globe; ResearchGate listing 184 articles by him. He has also authored a book under the name, Becoming A Successful Clinical Trial Investigator.

Julka is credited with the first peripheral blood stem cell transplant following high dose chemotherapy in Metastatic Breast Cancer in India which he performed on 9 May 1995. This feat was included by the Limca Book of World Records, in 1998. He was invited as the Expert Oncologist by the Indian Federation of United Nations Associations in 1983. He has been a member of the Indian Council of Medical Research Task Force for setting up cancer research projects across the country and is the oncology expert on the ICMR project review committee, since 1996. He is also a member of the Society of Cancer Research and the national advisory committee of Global Cancer Summit - 2015. The other positions held by Dr. Julka are: Former President - Association of Radiation Oncologists of India Former Chairperson - Indian College of Radiation Oncology (2000-2009)

== Awards and recognitions ==
Pramod Kumar Julka has won many awards and honours, besides the Padma Shri award (the fourth highest civilian award in the Republic of India) from the Government of India which he won in 2013 for his significant contribution to the field of medicine.

- Life Time Achievement Award by Association of Radiation Oncologists of India (AROI), 2013
- Fellow (FAMS) of the National Academy of Medical Sciences, 2013
- Indian Medical Association (IMA) Best Orator of the Year Award, 2009
- P K Haldar Oration Award - AROI Conference on Translational Research - 2007
- Indian Medical Association (IMA) Award for Clinical Oncology - 2006
- Dr. G.D. Pandey Oration Award - 2006
- NDB Oration Award - Indian Medical association - 2005
- Leading Scientist of the World Award - International Biographical Centre, Cambridge, England - 2005
- OISCA Foundation Award - 2001
- Indian Medical Association (IMA) Award for Medical Education and Research - 2000-2001
- Gold Medal - Indian Medical Association - 1995

== See also ==
- Maulana Azad Medical College
- All India Institute of Medical Sciences
