= Ramesh Bijlani =

Pakistani physician

- Born: 16 October 1947 (age 79); Sukkur, Pakistan
- Occupations: writer, inspirational speaker, medical scientist
- Writing career
- Genres: Yoga, nutrition, physiology
- Website: yespirituality.in

Ramesh Lal Bijlani, also known as R.L. Bijlani, (born 1947) is an Indian writer, inspirational speaker, medical scientist and retired Professor of Physiology who has specialized in physiology, nutrition, lifestyle medicine and yoga. He was educated at the All India Institute of Medical Sciences, New Delhi (MBBS, 1969; MD in Physiology, 1973) and the Massachusetts Institute of Technology, Cambridge, MA, USA (SM in Nutritional Biochemistry and Metabolism, 1979).

He is the author of more than 200 scientific papers (57 listed on PubMed), more than 100 popular articles, and more than 30 books for experts and the general public, for adults and children, on a wide variety of subjects, such as physiology, nutrition, research methodology, education, lifestyle diseases, yoga and spirituality.

His writings on yoga and spirituality are based on the integral yoga of Sri Aurobindo and the Mother. His books include a 1000-page textbook for medical students and teachers, Understanding Medical Physiology (2004), and a 32-page picture book for 5- to 8-year-olds, Our Body: A Wonderful Machine (1986), which was the best selling title published by the National Book Trust for the decade 1995–2005.

== Career ==
He was on the faculty of the All India Institute of Medical Sciences, New Delhi (AIIMS) from 1977 to 2005.

During this period, he went on leave for one year (1978-79) for studying at the Massachusetts Institute of Technology (MIT) on a United Nations University Fellowship, and was on deputation to the B.P. Koirala Institute of Health Sciences, Dharan, Nepal (BPKIHS), for two years (1994-1996) where he was Professor & Head of the Department of Physiology and Teaching Program Coordinator.

At AIIMS, he was Professor & Head of the Department of Physiology from 1996 to 2005. In the year 2000, he established at AIIMS a facility named ‘Integral Health Clinic’ for providing lifestyle modification courses based on yoga in tune with advances in mind-body medicine for prevention and management of chronic disease. He took voluntary retirement from AIIMS in 2005.

He has been staying and working at Sri Aurobindo Ashram (Delhi Branch) since 2006. In 2022, he initiated the online learning platform, YESpirituality, which stands for Yoga, Education & Spirituality, with a dedicated website and YouTube channel.

== Biography ==
=== Awards ===
1. Lifetime Achievement Award from the Association of Physiologists and Pharmacologists of India (APPI) in 2010. Bijlani gave a presentation during the award ceremony in March 2011 called "What is Life for Anyway?" Excerpts from the talk are on YouTube.
2. Yoga Forum Munchen Patanjali Award, 2018, of the Indian Association for the Study of Traditional Asian Medicine (IASTAM) for excellence in interdisciplinary development of yoga.
3. Conferred the title ‘Acharya Ratna Shiromani’ in recognition of selfless service and visionary leadership for the cause of world society through the field of medicine, yoga and holistic health during the 50th Anniversary Celebrations of Ananda Ashram, Pondicherry, by Yoga Jivana Satsangha (International), Pondicherry on 5 August 2018.
4. Atma Swasthya Sri Award (Instituted by Smt. Parvathi and Dr. H.B. Rajashekhar), 2018 on the occasion of the 129th Birth Anniversary Celebration of His Holiness Dr. Shivabasava Swamiji at a function held on 6 December 2018 at R.N. Shetty Polytechnic Campus, Shivabasavanagar, Belagavi, Karnataka.
5. Dr. Keshav Baliram Hedgewar Healing Honor Award for facilitating integrative and preventive healthcare by Rethink India on 21 June 2021.
6. Swami Kuvalayananda Yoga Puruskar for promotion of yoga and contributions to the science of yoga by Kaivalyadhama, Lonavala, on 22 October 2022.
7. Dr. B.K. Anand Memorial Award (2023) of the Nutrition Society of India for outstanding contributions to the field of Physiology and Nutritional Sciences on 26 November 2023.
8. Awarded the Lifetime Achievement Award of the All India Institute of Medical Sciences, New Delhi, on 21 March 2025 at the Convocation.
9. Delivered the Sixteenth Maulana Azad Memorial Lecture (2025) of the National Institute of Educational Planning and Administration, New Delhi, on 11 November 2025.
10. Awarded the Prime Minister’s Award for outstanding contributions to Promotion and Development of Yoga in the National (Individual) category (2024) on 19 December 2025.

=== Recognition ===
The Association of Physiologists of India instituted in 2021 the ‘Ramesh Bijlani Award for Contributions to Medical Sciences’. The first award was conferred upon Prof. Randeep Guleria, Director, AIIMS, New Delhi.

== Bibliography ==
- Eating Scientifically, Orient Longmans; 1974. ISBN 0-86125-049-4.
- Our Body: a wonderful machine, National Book Trust (India); 1986. ISBN 81-237-1104-2.
- The Human Machine: how to prevent breakdowns, National Book Trust (India); 1990. ISBN 81-237-1584-6.
- Nutrition: a practical approach, Jaypee; 1992. ISBN 978-81-8448-112-9.
- Understanding Medical Physiology, Jaypee; 3rd edition, 2004. ISBN 978-93-80704-81-4
- B.K. Anand: easy to admire, difficult to emulate, Jaypee; 1997. ISBN 81-7179-515-3.
- Fundamentals of Physiology, Jaypee; 2001. ISBN 81-7179-835-7.
- The Return of Ram, Gurgaon: Scholastics; 2006, ISBN 978-81-7655-579-1.
- Medical Research: all you wanted to know but did not know whom to ask, Jaypee; 2008. ISBN 978-81-8448-417-5.
- Back to Health through Yoga, Rupa; 2008. ISBN 978-81-291-1397-9.
- Eating Wisely and Well, Rupa; 2012. ISBN 978-81-291-1997-1
- Kavya Makes Up Her Mind, National Book Trust (India); 2014. ISBN 978-81-237-7218-9
- Kavya ka Faisla (Hindi Translation by the author), National Book Trust (India); 2015. ISBN 978-81-237-7639-2
- The School Called Marriage: how to graduate with flying colours (Co-author), Hay House (India); 2015. ISBN 978-93-84544-71-3
- A Primer on Yoga: theory and practice, National Book Trust (India); 2015. ISBN 978-81-237-7641-5
- What is Spiritual About Being Punctual? Discovering spirituality in unlikely places. Sri Aurobindo Ashram – Delhi Branch, 2018, 130 pp. ISBN 81-88847-83-6
- That’s Funny, That’s Not Funny. Illustrated by Pia Kwatra. Sri Aurobindo Ashram – Delhi Branch, 2018, 32 pp. ISBN 81-88847-81-X
- Hansne ki Baat Nahin Hai, Hansne ki Baat To Hai. (Hindi translation by the author). Illustrated by Pia Kwatra. Sri Aurobindo Ashram – Delhi Branch, 2018, 32 pp. ISBN 81-88847-82-8
- How Many Ice Creams, One or Two? Art Direction: Pia Kwatra, Illustrations: Kanchan Dhaila. Sri Aurobindo Ashram – Delhi Branch, 2018, 24 pp. ISBN 978-81-937314-1-3
- Ek Ice Cream Loon Yaa Do? (Hindi translation by the author) Art Direction: Pia Kwatra, Illustrations: Kanchan Dhaila. Sri Aurobindo Ashram – Delhi Branch, 2018, 24 pp. ISBN 978-81-937314-2-0
- The Story of Ram. Art Direction & Design: Pia Kwatra, Illustrations: Shalakya K Bhaduri. Sri Aurobindo Ashram – Delhi Branch, 2018, 32 pp. ISBN 978-81-937314-4-4
- Suno Kahani Ram Ki. (Hindi translation by the author) Art Direction & Design: Pia Kwatra, Illustrations: Shalakya K Bhaduri. Sri Aurobindo Ashram – Delhi Branch, 2019, 32 pp. ISBN 978-81-937314-6-8
- The Philosophy & Practice of Integral Education: a Handbook for Teachers & Parents. Sri Aurobindo Ashram – Delhi Branch, 2018, 176 pp. ISBN 978-81-937314-5-1
- A Small Ramayana for Big Boys & Girls. Illustrations: Bratin Khan. Design: Pia Kwatra. Sri Aurobindo Ashram – Delhi Branch, 2019, 48 pp. ISBN 978-81-937314-7-5
- Bijlani R. Chhotee-See Ramayana Bare Bachon Ke Liye. (Hindi translation by the author) Illustrations: Bratin Khan. Design: Pia Kwatra. Sri Aurobindo Ashram – Delhi Branch, 2020, 48 pp. ISBN 978-81-941078-4-2
- Understanding Spirituality … and Living It 24x7. Real Questions, Rational Answers. Sri Aurobindo Ashram – Delhi Branch, 2019, 352 pp. ISBN 978-81-941078-0-4 (pb.), ISBN 978-81-941078-1-1 (hc.)
- One Book, Two Stories. Deepa Knows Three Yogas. Anita Deals With a Quarrel. Illustrated by Sarita. Sri Aurobindo Ashram – Delhi Branch, 2020, 40 pp. ISBN 978-81-941078-7-3
- We Are All Drivers: Yoga for the Youth – A 3-Act Play. Illustrated by Sarita. Sri Aurobindo Ashram – Delhi Branch, 2020, 45 pp. ISBN 978-81-945458-0-4. Available only as an e-book on Amazon.
- Can You Kiss Your Own Face? Illustrated by Mohit Suneja. National Book Trust, India, 2020, 24 pp. ISBN 978-81-237-9381-8
- Sri Aurobindo for the Young. Illustrations: Subhash Chandra. National Book Trust, India, 2022, 86 pp. ISBN 978-93-5491-491-1
- What is Spiritual About Being Punctual? Rupa, 2022, 184 pp. ISBN 978-93-5520-780-7
- Sri Aurobindo: The Diary Divine – Daily Dose of Timeless Wisdom (Compiled by Ramesh Bijlani). National Book Trust, India, 2024, 379 pp. ISBN 978-93-5743-474-4
- Snippets Spiritual Inspired by Sri Aurobindo and The Mother. Sri Aurobindo Ashram – Delhi Branch, 2024, 112 pp. ISBN 978-81-955978-9-5
- Understanding Spirituality … and Living It 24x7. Real Questions, Rational Answers. Motilal Banarsidass Publishing House, 2025, 346 pp. ISBN ISBN 978-93-7100-531-9 (paper), ISBN 978-93-7100-869-3 (cloth).
- The Unwanted Coin. Based on the story titled ‘The Silver Shilling’ by Hans Christian Andersen. Illustrated by Sarita Jaiswal. Ink Impact Publishing (an imprint of Motilal Banarsidass Publishing House), 2025, 40 pp. ISBN 978-93-7100-747-4 (Hardcover), ISBN 978-93-6853-030-7 (Paperback)
