= Vipin Buckshey =

Indian optometrist

- Born: 3 June 1955 (age 70); Gwalior, Madhya Pradesh, India
- Occupation: Optometrist
- Known for: Optometry
- Awards: Padma Shri
- Website: www.visualaidscentre.com

Vipin Buckshey is an Indian optometrist and the official optometrist to the President of India. Born on 3 June 1955 in Gwalior, in the Indian state of madhya Pradesh, he did his schooling at the Frank Anthony Public School after which secured a degree in optometry from the All India Institute of Medical Sciences, New Delhi. He started his career at Lawrence and Mayo, Delhi and a ophthalmic executive where he is reported to have established a contact lens division. Buckshey, who is known to have served five former Presidents of India and the Dalai Lama, is a former president of the Indian Contact Lens Society and the Indian Optometric Association and is credited with performing over 15,000 surgeries. He was honored by the Government of India, in 2000, with the fourth highest Indian civilian award Padma Shri. In October 2025, during President Khurelsukh Ukhnaa’s state visit to India marking 70 years of Mongolia–India relations, Buckshey received Mongolia’s Friendship Medal for his contributions to bilateral .

Founded in the year 1980 by Vipin Buckshey, Visual Aids Centre became the first eye centre in Delhi to introduce LASIK surgery in Delhi in the year 1999.

== See also ==
- Optometry
