= Naval Kishore Vikram =

Indian physician

- Born: 1970 (age 55–56); India
- Known for: Studies on insulin resistance and obesity
- Awards: 2010 NASI-Scopus Young Scientist Award; 2012 N-BIOS Prize; 2013 AIIMS Excellence Award
- Scientific career
- Fields: Metabolic disorders; Diabetology
- Institutions: All India Institute of Medical Sciences, Delhi

Naval Kishore Vikram (born 1970) is an Indian physician, diabetologist and a professor at the department of medicine of the All India Institute of Medical Sciences, Delhi (AIIMS Delhi). He is known for his studies in the field of metabolic disorders with special emphasis on insulin resistance and obesity and his work assisted in profiling the Indian population with regard to imbalanced dietary practices and cardiovascular risk factors. He was a member of the group which proposed guidelines for obesity management, metabolic syndrome, and dietary controls for Asian Indians. His studies have been documented by way of a number of articles (Note: Please see Selected bibliography section) and ResearchGate, an online repository of scientific articles has listed 125 of them.

A member of the Institute Ethics Committee of AIIMS Delhi, Vikram received the NASI-Scopus Young Scientist Award in 2010. The Department of Biotechnology of the Government of India awarded him the National Bioscience Award for Career Development, one of the highest Indian science awards, for his contributions to biosciences, in 2012. He is also a recipient of the AIIMS Excellence Award, which he received in 2013.

== Selected bibliography ==
- Vikram, Naval K. (8 December 2017). "Cardiovascular and Metabolic Complications – Diagnosis and Management in Obese Children". The Indian Journal of Pediatrics. 85 (7): 535–545. doi:10.1007/s12098-017-2504-0. ISSN 0019-5456. PMID 29218646. S2CID 7372331.
- Madhusudhan, KumbleSeetharama; Yadav, AjayKumar; Gupta, ArunKumar; Vikram, NavalKishore; Nadarajah, Jeyaseelan (1 January 2015). "Acute hemorrhagic encephalitis: An unusual presentation of dengue viral infection". Indian Journal of Radiology and Imaging. 25 (1): 52–5. doi:10.4103/0971-3026.150145. PMC 4329688. PMID 25709166.
- Jain, Saransh; Sinha, Sanjeev; Sharma, Surendra K.; Samantaray, J. C.; Aggrawal, Praveen; Vikram, Naval Kishore; Biswas, Ashutosh; Sood, Seema; Goel, Manish (17 July 2014). "Procalcitonin as a prognostic marker for sepsis: a prospective observational study". BMC Research Notes. 7: 458. doi:10.1186/1756-0500-7-458. ISSN 1756-0500. PMC 4105100. PMID 25034373.

== See also ==
- Encephalitis
- Sepsis
