= Lalit Kumar =

Indian oncologist

- Born: India
- Education: Sarojini Naidu Medical College, Agra; Adyar Cancer Institute, Chennai; Royal Postgraduate Medical School
- Occupation: Medical Oncologist
- Awards: Padma Shri; B. C. Roy Award; ICMR Award; Ranbaxy Science Foundation Award; Fulbright fellowship

Lalit Kumar is an Indian oncologist, known to have contributed to the development of low cost medical facilities in Delhi. The Government of India honoured him, in 2014, with the award of Padma Shri, the fourth highest civilian award, for his contributions to the fields of medicine.

== Early life and education ==
Cancer cells grow everyday and very fast. So, loss of even a day is a great loss, says Dr. Lalit Kumar.

Kumar is a graduate in medicine from Sarojini Naidu Medical College, Agra. He completed his higher studies (DM) at the Adyar Cancer Institute, Chennai and followed it up with a post doctoral fellowship at the Royal Postgraduate Medical School of the Hammersmith Hospital, London. Kumar, a Fulbright scholar, is the Professor and Head of the Medical Oncology department at Dr. B. R. Ambedkar Institute Rotary Cancer Hospital, All India Institute of Medical Sciences (AIIMS), New Delhi where he focuses on Multiple Myeloma and Gynaecological malignancies. During his tenure at the AIIMS, Kumar is known to have developed cost effective treatment protocols for sustained bone marrow and stem cell transplantations.

== Career ==
Kumar is a member of the Indo British Health Initiative (IBHI), a foundation promoting scientific collaboration on healthcare between the UK and India. He represents AIIMS in the inter institutional collaborative initiative with Institute of Women's Health (IfWH) of the University College of London (UCL) in the area of gynecological oncology. He is also a member of the Expert Committee to examine the Serious Adverse Events (SAE) of deaths occurring during clinical trials.

Kumar's researches have been documented. Pubfacts, a knowledge repository with PubMed scientific data, has listed over 50 articles by Dr. Lalit Kumar. He also attends international conferences on a regular basis.

== Awards and recognition ==
Kumar has been honoured by the Indian Academy of Sciences (FASc) and the National Academy of Medical Sciences of India (FAMS) with fellowships. He is also a recipient of the Indian Council of Medical Research (ICMR) award and Ranbaxy Science Foundation award. In 2008, the Government of India honoured him with Dr. B. C. Roy Award, the highest award by the Indian government in the medical category. This was followed by another government honour, the Padma Shri when he was included in the Republic Day honours in 2014.

== See also ==
- Mukesh Batra
