= Pushkar Sharma (medical researcher) =

Indian medical scientist

Pushkar Sharma is a medical scientist working in the National Institute of Immunology, New Delhi, India. He was awarded the Shanti Swarup Bhatnagar Prize for science and technology, the highest science award in India, for the year 2013 in medical science category. Sharma's research interests are in the areas of genetics, cell signalling and cancer biology, with special focus on problems connected with dissection of eukaryotic cell signaling pathways.

Sharma secured M Sc degree from Bareilly College, Bareilly, Rohilkhand University, India and PhD from All India Institute of Medical Sciences, New Delhi.
