= Mycobacterium indicus pranii =

Scientific classification
- Domain: Bacteria
- Phylum: Actinomycetota
- Class: Actinomycetes
- Order: Mycobacteriales
- Family: Mycobacteriaceae
- Genus: Mycobacterium
- Species: M. indicus pranii

Binomial name
- Mycobacterium indicus pranii Ahmed et al. 2007; Saini et al. 2009

Synonyms
- Mycobacterium w

Species of bacterium

This species of the genus Mycobacterium was hierarchically and exhaustively described based on comparative genomics and evolutionary dynamics, and its name was officially coined as Mycobacterium indicus pranii (MIP), existing in evolution as a predecessor of the Mycobacterium avium-intracellulare complex (MAIC). Later, its species status was taxonomically established and described as a non-pathogenic Mycobacterium species based on its growth characteristics and genomic properties. The novelty of this bacterium is due to its translational application as an immunotherapeutic. The genome of the organism has since been completely sequenced.

The origin of the taxonomic name was based on a suggestive idea encompassing the country of isolation, India (indicus), and its initial discovery by Pran Talwar at the National Institute of Immunology, India (pranii).
