= Ministry of Health and Family Welfare =

Government ministry of India

- Branch of the Indian government

- Ministry of Health & Family Welfare

Agency overview
- Formed: 15 August 1947; 79 years ago
- Jurisdiction: Government of India
- Headquarters: Kartavya Bhavan-01 Janpath, New Delhi
- Annual budget: ₹106,530.42 crore (US$11 billion) (2026–27)
- Ministers responsible: J. P. Nadda, Cabinet Minister; Anupriya Patel, Ministers of state; Prataprao Ganpatrao Jadhav, Ministers of state
- Agency executives: Punya Salila Srivastava, IAS, Secretary of the Department of Health & Family Welfare; Rajiv Bahl, Secretary of the Department of Health Research; Dr. Loveneesh Gopal Krishna (CHS), Director General of Health Services; Sunil Kumar Barnwal(IAS), CEO of the National Health Authority
- Child agencies: Department of Health & Family Welfare; Department of Health Research
- Website: Official website

The Ministry of Health and Family Welfare (MoHFW) is a ministry of the Government of India charged with health policy in India. It is also responsible for all government programs relating to family planning in India.

The Minister of Health and Family Welfare holds cabinet rank as a member of the Council of Ministers. The current minister is Jagat Prakash Nadda, while the current Minister of State for Health are Anupriya Patel and Prataprao Ganpatrao Jadhav.

Since 1955, the Ministry regularly publishes the Indian Pharmacopoeia through the Indian Pharmacopoeia Commission (IPC), an autonomous body for setting standards for drugs, pharmaceuticals and healthcare devices and technologies in India.

== Organisation ==
The ministry is composed of various departments and organisation. Directorate General of Health Services (India) and Department of Health and Family Welfare and Department of Health Research.

=== Directorate General of Health Services ===
The Directorate General of Health Services (DGHS) is a department responsible for technical knowledge concerning Public Health, Medical Education and Health Care.

- National Medical Library

=== Department of Health ===
The Department of Health deals with health care, including awareness campaigns, immunisation campaigns, preventive medicine, and public health. Bodies under the administrative control of this department are:

- National AIDS Control Organisation (NACO) (see HIV/AIDS in India)
- National Board of Examinations in Medical Sciences(NBE)
- 14 National Health Programmes
  - National AIDS Control Programme (AIDS) Department Of Aids Control (National AIDS Control Organisation) (Details About Aids)
  - National Cancer Control Programme (cancer) (since 1985)
  - National Filaria Control Programme (filariasis)
  - National Iodine Deficiency Disorders Control Programme (iodine deficiency)
  - National Leprosy Eradication Programme (leprosy)
  - National Mental Health Programme (mental health)
  - National Programme for Control of Blindness (blindness)
  - National Programme for Prevention and Control of Deafness (deafness)
  - National Tobacco Control Programme (tobacco control)
  - National Vector Borne Disease Control Programme (NVBDCP) (vector-borne disease)
  - Pilot Programme on Prevention and Control of Diabetes, CVD and Stroke (diabetes, cardiovascular disease, stroke)
  - National Programme on Climate Change and Human Health (Climate change)
  - Revised National TB Control Programme (tuberculosis)
  - Universal Immunisation Programme
  - National Tele Mental Health Programme – Tele MANAS(mental health)
- National Institute of Mental Health & Neurosciences, Bangalore
- National commission for Allied And Healthcare Professionals (NCAHP)
- National Medical Commission (NMC)
  - Under-Graduate Medical Education Board (UGMEB)
  - Post-Graduate Medical Education Board (PGMEB)
  - Medical Assessment and Rating Board
  - Ethics and Medical Registration Board
- National Dental Commission (NDC)
- Pharmacy Council of India
- Indian Nursing Council
- All India Institute of Speech and Hearing (AIISH), Mysuru
- All India Institute of Physical Medicine and Rehabilitation (AIIPMR), Mumbai
- Food Safety and Standards Authority of India
- Central Drugs Standard Control Organization
- National Centre for Disease Control
- Health Division
  - Disaster Management Cell
  - Blindness Control
  - Bureau of Planning
  - Cancer Control Programme
  - Central Design Bureau
  - Central Health Service (CHS)
  - Drugs Food Quality control division
  - Emergency Medical Relief
  - International Health and Cooperation
  - Immunization
  - Institutes of National Importance-II
  - Medical Education
  - Medical Value Travel
  - Mental Health Division
  - National Programme For Prevention and Control of Cancer, Diabetes, Cardiovascular Disease and Stroke
  - National Programme for Health Care of the Elderly
  - National Programme for Prevention and Control of Deafness
  - National Center for Vector Borne Diseases Control
  - Non Government Organisations
  - National Health Mission Finance
  - National Health Mission policy & planning
  - National Universal Health Mission
  - Infrastructure & HR Division
  - E-Health
  - Medical Education Policy - II
  - Dental
  - Nursing
  - Pradhan Mantri Swasthya Suraksha Yojana (PMSSY)
  - Pre-Conception and Pre-Natal Diagnostic Techniques (PNTD)
  - Principal Accounts Office
  - Training
  - Procurement
  - Revised National Tuberculosis Programme
  - Statistics
  - Activities of Health and Family Welfare
  - OP & Nirodh Marketing
  - Drug De-Addiction Programme
  - Central Public Sector Enterprises
  - Drugs Regulation

=== Department of Family Welfare ===
The Department of Family Welfare (FW) is responsible for aspects relating to family welfare, especially in reproductive health, maternal health, pediatrics, information, education and communications; cooperation with NGOs and international aid groups; and rural health services. The Department of Family Welfare is responsible for:

- 18 Population Research Centres (PRCs) at six universities and six other institutions across 17 states
- National Institute of Health and Family Welfare (NIHFW), Delhi
- International Institute for Population Sciences (IIPS), Mumbai
- Central Drug Research Institute (CDRI), Lucknow

=== Department of Health Research ===
The Department of Health Research (DHR) is responsible for formulation, support, coordination and promotion of biomedical research in India

- Indian Council of Medical Research
  - National Institute of Nutrition (NIN), Hyderabad
  - National Animal Resource Facility for Biomedical Research (NARF-BR), Hyderabad
  - National Institute for Research in Tuberculosis (NIRT), Chennai
  - National Institute of Epidemiology (NIE), Chennai
  - National Institute of Cancer Prevention and Research (NICPR), Noida
  - National Institute of Malaria Research (NIMR), Delhi
  - Rajendra Memorial Research Institute of Medical Sciences (RMRIMS), Patna
  - National Institute for Research in Reproductive Health (NIRRH), Mumbai
  - National Institute of Virology (NIV), Pune
  - National Institute of Traditional Medicine (NITM), Belagavi
  - Microbial Containment Complex (MCC), Pune
  - National AIDS Research Institute (NARI), Pune
  - National Institute of Occupational Health (NIOH), Ahmedabad
  - National Institute of Pathology (NIP), Delhi
  - National Institute of Medical Statistics (NIMS), Delhi
  - Vector Control Research Centre (VCRC), Puducherry
  - National Institute of Cholera and Enteric Diseases (NICED), Kolkata
  - National Institute for Research in Tribal Health (NIRTH), Jabalpur
  - National Center for Disease Informatics and Research (NCDIR), Bengaluru
  - Bhopal Memorial Hospital and Research Center (BMHRC), Bhopal
  - National Institute for Research in Environmental Health (NIREH), Bhopal
  - National JALMA Institute for Leprosy & Other Mycobacterial Diseases (NJILOMD), Agra
  - Centre for Research in Medical Entomology (CRME), Madurai
  - National Institute of Immunohaemotology (NIIH), Mumbai
  - Enterovirus Research Centre (ERC), Mumbai
  - Genetic Research Centre (GRC), Mumbai
  - National Institute for Implementation Research on Non-Communicable Diseases (NIIRNCD), Jodhpur
  - Regional Medical Research Center (RMRC), Port Blair
  - Regional Medical Research Centre (RMRC), Gorakhpur
  - Regional Medical Research Center (RMRC), Bhubaneswar
  - Regional Medical Research Centre, Dibrugarh
  - ICMR Virus Unit (IVU), Kolkata
  - Institute of Reproductive Medicine (IRM), Kolkata
- Health Technology Assessment in India (HTAIn)

=== Think Tank/Other Autonomous Bodies ===
  - National Health Systems Resource Centre, a think-tank.
  - Central Medical Services Society
  - Pasteur Institute of India

== Cabinet Ministers ==
Portrait	Minister (Birth-Death) Constituency	Term of office			Political party	Ministry	Prime Minister
Portrait	Minister (Birth-Death) Constituency	From	To	Period	Political party	Ministry	Prime Minister
Minister of Health
	Rajkumari Amrit Kaur DStJ (1887–1964); MP for Central Provinces and Berar, till 1952; MP for Mandi Mahasu, from 1952	15 August 1947	17 April 1957	9 years, 244 days	Indian National Congress	Nehru I	Jawaharlal Nehru
	Rajkumari Amrit Kaur DStJ (1887–1964); MP for Central Provinces and Berar, till 1952; MP for Mandi Mahasu, from 1952	15 August 1947	17 April 1957	9 years, 244 days	Indian National Congress	Nehru II	Jawaharlal Nehru
	D. P. Karmarkar (1902–1991); MP for Dharwad North (Minister of State)	17 April 1957	9 April 1962	4 years, 357 days	Indian National Congress	Nehru III	Jawaharlal Nehru
	Sushila Nayyar (1914–2001); MP for Jhansi (Minister of State)	10 April 1962	24 January 1966	2 years, 145 days	Indian National Congress	Nehru IV	Jawaharlal Nehru
	Sushila Nayyar (1914–2001); MP for Jhansi (Minister of State)	10 April 1962	24 January 1966	2 years, 145 days	Indian National Congress	Nanda I	Gulzarilal Nanda
	Sushila Nayyar (1914–2001); MP for Jhansi (Minister of State)	10 April 1962	24 January 1966	2 years, 145 days	Indian National Congress	Shastri	Lal Bahadur Shastri
	Sushila Nayyar (1914–2001); MP for Jhansi (Minister of State)	10 April 1962	24 January 1966	2 years, 145 days	Indian National Congress	Nanda II	Gulzarilal Nanda
Minister of Health and Family Planning
	Sushila Nayyar (1914–2001); MP for Jhansi (Minister of State)	24 January 1966	13 March 1967	323 days	Indian National Congress	Indira I	Indira Gandhi
	Sripati Chandrasekhar (1918–2001); Rajya Sabha MP for Tamil Nadu (Minister of State)	13 March 1967	14 November 1967	246 days	Indian National Congress	Indira II	Indira Gandhi
	Satya Narayan Sinha (1900–1983); MP for Darbhanga	14 November 1967	14 February 1969	1 year, 92 days	Indian National Congress	Indira II	Indira Gandhi
	Kodardas Kalidas Shah (1908–1986); Rajya Sabha MP for Gujarat	14 February 1969	19 May 1971	2 years, 94 days	Indian National Congress (R)	Indira II	Indira Gandhi
	Uma Shankar Dikshit (1901–1991); Rajya Sabha MP for Uttar Pradesh	19 May 1971	5 February 1973	1 year, 262 days	Indian National Congress (R)	Indira III	Indira Gandhi
	Raghunath Keshav Khadilkar (1905–1979); MP for Khed (Minister of State)	5 February 1973	9 November 1973	277 days	Indian National Congress (R)	Indira III	Indira Gandhi
	Karan Singh (born 1931); MP for Udhampur	9 November 1973	24 March 1977	3 years, 135 days	Indian National Congress (R)	Indira III	Indira Gandhi
Minister of Health and Family Welfare
	Raj Narain (1917–1986); MP for Allahabad	28 March 1977	1 July 1978	1 year, 95 days	Janata Party	Desai	Morarji Desai
	Morarji Desai (1896–1995); MP for Surat (Prime Minister)	1 July 1978	24 January 1979	207 days	Janata Party	Desai	Morarji Desai
	Rabi Ray (1926–2017); Rajya Sabha MP for Odisha	25 January 1979	15 July 1979	171 days	Janata Party	Desai	Morarji Desai
	Morarji Desai (1896–1995); MP for Surat (Prime Minister)	16 July 1979	28 July 1979	12 days	Janata Party	Desai	Morarji Desai
	Rabi Ray (1926–2017); Rajya Sabha MP for Odisha	28 July 1979	14 January 1980	170 days	Janata Party (Secular)	Charan Singh	Charan Singh
	B. Shankaranand (1925–2009); MP for Chikkodi	16 January 1980	31 October 1984	4 years, 350 days	Indian National Congress	Indira IV	Indira Gandhi
	B. Shankaranand (1925–2009); MP for Chikkodi	4 November 1984	31 December 1984	4 years, 350 days	Indian National Congress	Rajiv I	Rajiv Gandhi
	Mohsina Kidwai (1932–2026); MP for Meerut	31 December 1984	24 June 1986	1 year, 175 days	Indian National Congress	Rajiv II	Rajiv Gandhi
	Rajiv Gandhi (1944–1991); MP for Amethi (Prime Minister)	24 June 1986	14 February 1988	1 year, 235 days	Indian National Congress	Rajiv II	Rajiv Gandhi
	Motilal Vora (1928–2020); Rajya Sabha MP for Madhya Pradesh	14 February 1988	24 January 1989	345 days	Indian National Congress	Rajiv II	Rajiv Gandhi
	Ram Niwas Mirdha (1924–2010); Rajya Sabha MP for Rajasthan (Minister of State, I/C)	24 January 1989	4 July 1989	161 days	Indian National Congress	Rajiv II	Rajiv Gandhi
	Rafique Alam (1929–2011); Rajya Sabha MP for Bihar (Minister of State, I/C)	4 July 1989	2 December 1989	151 days	Indian National Congress	Rajiv II	Rajiv Gandhi
	Nilamani Routray (1920–2004); MP for Puri	6 December 1989	23 April 1990	138 days	Janata Dal	Vishwanath	V. P. Singh
	Rasheed Masood (1947–2020); MP for Saharanpur (Minister of State, I/C)	23 April 1990	10 November 1990	201 days	Janata Dal	Vishwanath	V. P. Singh
	Shakeelur Rehman (1931–2016); MP for Darbhanga	21 November 1990	20 February 1991	91 days	Samajwadi Janata Party (Rashtriya)	Chandra Shekhar	Chandra Shekhar
	Chandra Shekhar (1927–2007); MP for Ballia (Prime Minister)	20 February 1991	21 June 1991	121 days	Samajwadi Janata Party (Rashtriya)	Chandra Shekhar	Chandra Shekhar
	Makhan Lal Fotedar (1932–2017); Rajya Sabha MP for Uttar Pradesh	21 June 1991	17 January 1993	1 year, 210 days	Indian National Congress	Rao	P. V. Narasimha Rao
	B. Shankaranand (1925–2009); MP for Chikkodi	18 January 1993	22 December 1994	1 year, 338 days	Indian National Congress	Rao	P. V. Narasimha Rao
	P. V. Narasimha Rao (1921–2004); MP for Nandyal (Prime Minister)	23 December 1994	11 June 1995	170 days	Indian National Congress	Rao	P. V. Narasimha Rao
	A. R. Antulay (1929–2014); MP for Kolaba	11 June 1995	16 May 1996	340 days	Indian National Congress	Rao	P. V. Narasimha Rao
	Sartaj Singh (born 1940); MP for Narmadapuram	16 May 1996	1 June 1996	16 days	Bharatiya Janata Party	Vajpayee I	Atal Bihari Vajpayee
	H. D. Deve Gowda (born 1933); Unelected (Prime Minister)	1 June 1996	29 June 1996	28 days	Janata Dal	Deve Gowda	H. D. Deve Gowda
	Saleem Iqbal Shervani (born 1953); MP for Badaun (Minister of State, I/C)	29 June 1996	9 June 1997	345 days	Samajwadi Party	Deve Gowda	H. D. Deve Gowda
	Saleem Iqbal Shervani (born 1953); MP for Badaun (Minister of State, I/C)	29 June 1996	9 June 1997	345 days	Samajwadi Party	Gujral	Inder Kumar Gujral
	Inder Kumar Gujral (1919–2012); Rajya Sabha MP for Bihar (Prime Minister)	9 June 1997	19 March 1998	283 days	Janata Dal	Gujral	Inder Kumar Gujral
	Dalit Ezhilmalai (1945–2020); MP for Chidambaram (Minister of State, I/C)	20 March 1998	14 August 1999	1 year, 0 days	Pattali Makkal Katchi	Vajpayee II	Atal Bihari Vajpayee
	Atal Bihari Vajpayee (1924–2018); MP for Lucknow (Prime Minister)	14 August 1999	16 August 1999	2 days	Bharatiya Janata Party	Vajpayee II	Atal Bihari Vajpayee
	A. K. Patel (born 1931); MP for Mehsena (Minister of State, I/C)	16 August 1999	13 October 1999	58 days	Bharatiya Janata Party	Vajpayee II	Atal Bihari Vajpayee
	N. T. Shanmugam; MP for Vellore (Minister of State, I/C)	13 October 1999	27 May 2000	227 days	Pattali Makkal Katchi	Vajpayee III	Atal Bihari Vajpayee
	C. P. Thakur (born 1931); MP for Patna	27 May 2000	1 July 2002	2 years, 35 days	Bharatiya Janata Party	Vajpayee III	Atal Bihari Vajpayee
	Shatrughan Sinha (born 1946); Rajya Sabha MP for Bihar	1 July 2002	29 January 2003	212 days	Bharatiya Janata Party	Vajpayee III	Atal Bihari Vajpayee
	Sushma Swaraj (1952–2019); Rajya Sabha MP for Uttarakhand	29 January 2003	22 May 2004	1 year, 114 days	Bharatiya Janata Party	Vajpayee III	Atal Bihari Vajpayee
	Anbumani Ramadoss (born 1968); Rajya Sabha MP for Tamil Nadu	23 May 2004	29 March 2009	4 years, 310 days	Pattali Makkal Katchi	Manmohan I	Manmohan Singh
	Panabaka Lakshmi (born 1958); MP for Nellore (Minister of State, I/C)	29 March 2009	22 May 2009	54 days	Indian National Congress	Manmohan I	Manmohan Singh
	Ghulam Nabi Azad (born 1949); Rajya Sabha MP for Jammu and Kashmir	29 May 2009	26 May 2014	4 years, 362 days	Indian National Congress	Manmohan II	Manmohan Singh
	Harsh Vardhan (born 1954); MP for Chandni Chowk	26 May 2014	9 November 2014	99 days	Bharatiya Janata Party	Modi I	Narendra Modi
	Jagat Prakash Nadda (born 1960); Rajya Sabha MP for Himachal Pradesh	9 November 2014	30 May 2019	4 years, 202 days	Bharatiya Janata Party	Modi I	Narendra Modi
	Harsh Vardhan (born 1954); MP for Chandni Chowk	30 May 2019	7 July 2021	2 years, 37 days	Bharatiya Janata Party	Modi II	Narendra Modi
	Mansukh Mandaviya (born 1972); Rajya Sabha MP for Gujarat	7 July 2021	9 June 2024	2 years, 338 days	Bharatiya Janata Party	Modi II	Narendra Modi
	Jagat Prakash Nadda (born 1960); Rajya Sabha MP for Gujarat	9 June 2024	Incumbent	2 years, 138 days	Bharatiya Janata Party	Modi III	Narendra Modi

== Ministers of State ==
Portrait	Minister (Birth-Death) Constituency	Term of office			Political party	Ministry	Prime Minister
Portrait	Minister (Birth-Death) Constituency	From	To	Period	Political party	Ministry	Prime Minister
Minister of State for Health and Family Planning
	Sripati Chandrasekhar (1918–2001); Rajya Sabha MP for Tamil Nadu	14 November 1967	26 June 1970	2 years, 224 days	Indian National Congress	Indira II	Indira Gandhi
	Bayya Suryanarayana Murthy (1906–1979); MP for Kakinada	18 February 1969	13 March 1971	2 years, 23 days	Indian National Congress	Indira II	Indira Gandhi
	Parimal Ghosh (1917–1985); MP for Ghatal	26 June 1970	18 March 1971	265 days	Indian National Congress	Indira II	Indira Gandhi
	D. P. Chattopadhyaya (1933–2022); Rajya Sabha MP for West Bengal	2 May 1971	5 February 1973	1 year, 279 days	Indian National Congress	Indira III	Indira Gandhi
	Ram Sewak Chowdhary (born 1927); Rajya Sabha MP for Uttar Pradesh	1 December 1975	24 March 1977	1 year, 113 days	Indian National Congress	Indira III	Indira Gandhi
Minister of State for Health and Family Welfare
	Jagadambi Prasad Yadav (1925–2002); MP for Godda	14 August 1977	26 January 1979	1 year, 165 days	Janata Party	Desai	Morarji Desai
	Nihar Ranjan Laskar (born 1932); MP for Karimganj	14 January 1980	15 January 1982	2 years, 1 day	Indian National Congress	Indira IV	Indira Gandhi
	Mohsina Kidwai (1932–2026); MP for Meerut	29 January 1983	2 August 1984	1 year, 186 days	Indian National Congress	Indira IV	Indira Gandhi
	Yogendra Makwana (born 1933); Rajya Sabha MP for Gujarat (Health)	31 December 1984	25 September 1985	268 days	Indian National Congress	Rajiv II	Rajiv Gandhi
	Saroj Khaparde; Rajya Sabha MP for Maharashtra	12 May 1986	4 July 1989	3 years, 53 days	Indian National Congress	Rajiv II	Rajiv Gandhi
	Taradevi Siddhartha (born 1953); MP for Chikmagalur	26 June 1991	18 January 1993	1 year, 206 days	Indian National Congress	Rao	P. V. Narasimha Rao
	K. V. Thangkabalu (born 1950); MP for Salem	19 January 1993	16 May 1996	3 years, 118 days	Indian National Congress	Rao	P. V. Narasimha Rao
	C. Silvera (1935–2016); MP for Mizoram	17 February 1994	15 September 1995	1 year, 210 days	Indian National Congress	Rao	P. V. Narasimha Rao
	Paban Singh Ghatowar (born 1950); MP for Dibrugarh (Indian System of Medicines and Homoeopathy)	15 September 1995	16 May 1996	244 days	Indian National Congress	Rao	P. V. Narasimha Rao
	Saleem Iqbal Shervani (born 1953); MP for Badaun	1 June 1996	29 June 1996	28 days	Samajwadi Party	Deve Gowda	H. D. Deve Gowda
	A. Raja (born 1963); MP for Perambalur	30 September 2000	21 December 2003	3 years, 82 days	Dravida Munnetra Kazhagam	Vajpayee III	Atal Bihari Vajpayee
	Vallabhbhai Kathiria (born 1954); MP for Rajkot	29 January 2003	30 January 2003	1 day	Bharatiya Janata Party	Vajpayee III	Atal Bihari Vajpayee
	Vallabhbhai Kathiria (born 1954); MP for Rajkot	9 January 2004	22 May 2004	134 days	Bharatiya Janata Party	Vajpayee III	Atal Bihari Vajpayee
	Panabaka Lakshmi (born 1958); MP for Nellore	23 May 2004	29 March 2009	4 years, 310 days	Indian National Congress	Manmohan I	Manmohan Singh
	S. Gandhiselvan (born 1963); MP for Namakkal	28 May 2009	20 March 2013	3 years, 296 days	Dravida Munnetra Kazhagam	Manmohan II	Manmohan Singh
	Dinesh Trivedi (born 1950); MP for Barrackpore	28 May 2009	12 July 2011	2 years, 45 days	Trinamool Congress	Manmohan II	Manmohan Singh
	Sudip Bandyopadhyay (born 1952); MP for Kolkata Uttar	12 July 2011	22 September 2012	1 year, 72 days	Trinamool Congress	Manmohan II	Manmohan Singh
	Abu Hasem Khan Choudhury (1938–2026); MP for Maldaha Dakshin Lok Sabha constituency	28 October 2012	26 May 2014	1 year, 210 days	Indian National Congress	Manmohan II	Manmohan Singh
	Santosh Chowdhary (born 1944); MP for Hoshiarpur	17 June 2013	26 May 2014	343 days	Indian National Congress	Manmohan II	Manmohan Singh
	Shripad Naik (born 1952); MP for North Goa	9 November 2014	5 July 2016	1 year, 239 days	Bharatiya Janata Party	Modi I	Narendra Modi
	Faggan Singh Kulaste (born 1959); MP for Mandla	5 July 2016	3 September 2017	1 year, 60 days	Bharatiya Janata Party	Modi I	Narendra Modi
	Anupriya Patel (born 1981); MP for Mirzapur	5 July 2016	30 May 2019	2 years, 329 days	Apna Dal (Soneylal)	Modi I	Narendra Modi
	Ashwini Kumar Choubey (born 1953); MP for Buxar	3 September 2017	7 July 2021	3 years, 307 days	Bharatiya Janata Party	Modi I	Narendra Modi
	Ashwini Kumar Choubey (born 1953); MP for Buxar	3 September 2017	7 July 2021	3 years, 307 days	Bharatiya Janata Party	Modi II	Narendra Modi
	Bharati Pawar (born 1978); MP for Dindori	7 July 2021	9 June 2024	2 years, 338 days	Bharatiya Janata Party	Modi II	Narendra Modi
	S. P. Singh Baghel (born 1960); MP for Agra	18 May 2023	9 June 2024	1 year, 22 days	Bharatiya Janata Party	Modi II	Narendra Modi
	Prataprao Ganpatrao Jadhav (born 1960); MP for Buldhana	9 June 2024	Incumbent	2 years, 138 days	Shiv Sena	Modi III	Narendra Modi
	Anupriya Patel (born 1981); MP for Mirzapur	9 June 2024	Incumbent	2 years, 138 days	Apna Dal (Soneylal)	Modi III	Narendra Modi

== See also ==
- National Medical Commission
- Central Health Service (CHS)
- Directorate General of Health Services (DGHS)
- Mission Indradhanush
- Arogyavani
- Integrated disease surveillance program (IDSP)
- Pradhan Mantri Digital Health Mission (PMDHM)
- Traditional Knowledge Digital Library
- Health effects of pesticides
- Pesticide poisoning
- Pesticide residue
- Environmental impact of pesticides
- Pesticide regulation in the United States
- Regulation of pesticides in the European Union
