= T. C. Anand Kumar =

Indian biologist

- Born: 18 January 1936; Madras Presidency, British India (now Tamil Nadu, India)
- Died: 26 January 2010 (aged 73); Bengaluru, Karnataka, India
- Education: Jai Narain Vyas University
- Known for: In vitro fertilisation; Neuroendocrinology; Primate biology
- Awards: 1977 Shanti Swarup Bhatnagar Prize; Sanjay Gandhi National Award
- Scientific career
- Fields: Reproductive biology
- Workplaces: All India Institute of Medical Sciences Delhi; National Institute for Research in Reproductive Health; Hope Infertility Clinic

Tiruchirappalli Chelvaraj Anand Kumar (1936–2010) was an Indian biologist and reproductive biologist and the creator of the second scientifically documented test tube baby in India. (Note: It was reported that the birth of Durga, the first test tube baby born in India, was pioneered by Subhas Mukhopadhyay which was subsequently acknowledged and supported by Anand Kumar.) He was the founder of Hope Infertility Clinic, Bangalore and the director of the National Institute for Research in Reproductive Health (then known as Institute for Research in Reproduction). He was an elected fellow of the Indian Academy of Sciences and the National Academy of Medical Sciences and a recipient of the Sanjay Gandhi National Award. The Council of Scientific and Industrial Research, the apex agency of the Government of India for scientific research, awarded him the Shanti Swarup Bhatnagar Prize for Science and Technology, one of the highest Indian science awards, in 1977, for his contributions to biological sciences.

== Biography ==
Born on 18 January 1936 in a Tamil family in the south Indian state of Tamil Nadu, Anand Kumar did his early college studies in Bengaluru before securing a doctoral degree from the Jai Narain Vyas University. Subsequently, he went to the UK for post-doctoral research but returned to India to join the All India Institute of Medical Sciences Delhi in 1969, where he worked till 1982. Later, he moved to the Institute for Research in Reproduction, Mumbai, (present-day National Institute for Research in Reproductive Health) where he worked till his superannuation from official service and founded Hope Infertility Clinic in Bengaluru, a center for infertility clinical service.

Kumar was married to Karpagam and the couple had a son, Vijay and a daughter, Ambika. The family lived in Bengaluru and it was here, he died on the Indian Republic Day (26 January) of 2010, at the age of 74, survived by his wife, children and three grandchildren.

== India's Second test tube baby ==
During his tenure at the National Institute for Research in Reproductive Health, Kumar was involved in research on in-vitro fertilization and led a team which created the first official test tube baby in India. The baby, Harsha Chawda née Harsha, was born on 6 August 1986 at King Edward Memorial Hospital and Seth Gordhandas Sunderdas Medical College, Mumbai, by a caesarian section performed by Indira Hinduja. Subsequently, he learned of the researches of Subhash Mukherjee and of the birth of Kanupriya Agarwal (Durga) on 3 October 1978 in Kolkata under the supervision of Mukherjee. Kumar checked the handwritten notes and research papers of Mukherjee and acknowledged that the first test tube baby born in India was Durga. (Note: Subhash Mukherjee, reportedly due to the negligence of his research accomplishment by the establishment, committed suicide on 19 June 1981.) He delivered the Subhas Mukerji Memorial Oration at the third National Congress on Assisted Reproductive Technology and Advances in Infertility Management held in Kolkata on 8 February 1997 and published an article under the title, Architect of India's first test tube baby: Dr. Subhas Mukherjee, the same year through which he established that many of Mukherjee's techniques were pioneering. His efforts were reported to have influenced the subsequent acceptance by the Indian Council of Medical Research (ICMR) which eventually recognized the work of Mukherjee.

== Other contributions ==
Kumar, whose researches covered many aspects of assisted reproductive technology and the role of neuroendocrine system in reproduction, was known to have introduced a technique for endonasal administration of hormones. His researches revealed the path of gonadal hormones to the brain through cerebro-spinal fluid and his technique of endonasal administration of steroids started a contraceptive administration protocol through nasal route which resulted in the preferential transfer of contraceptives into cerebro-spinal fluid, then known to be a novel approach in contraception. He was the author of several articles detailing his researches, published in peer reviewed national and international journals, PubMed, an online repository of scientific papers, has listed 53 of them. Soon after joining the All India Institute of Medical Sciences Delhi, he established an electron microscopy laboratory in 1970 and later a neuroendocrine research laboratory at the institution. In 1988, he founded the Indian Society for the Study of Reproduction and Fertility (ISSRF) for providing a platform for researches in reproductive biology and served as its founder president. He was a part of the Indian Council of Medical Research team which drafted the National Guidelines for Accreditation, Supervision and Regulation of ART Clinics in India in 2005. He was also associated with organizations such as the World Health Organization and the Council of Scientific and Industrial Research and government agencies such as the Department of Science and Technology and the Department of Biotechnology as their adviser.

== Awards and honors ==
The Council of Scientific and Industrial Research awarded Kumar the Shanti Swarup Bhatnagar Prize, one of the highest Indian science awards, in 1977 for his contributions in the field of neuroendocrinology of primate reproduction. The Indian Academy of Sciences elected him as a fellow in 1981 and he became a fellow of the National Academy of Medical Sciences in October 2011. He was also a fellow of the Gonville and Caius College, Cambridge and a recipient of the Sanjay Gandhi National Award. The Indian Society for the Study of Reproduction and Fertility has instituted an award oration, Founder-President Dr. T. C. Anand Kumar Memorial Oration in his honor.

== See also ==
- Subhash Mukhopadhyay (physician)
- Indira Hinduja
