= Amit Prakash Sharma =

Indian biologist (born 1968)

Amit P. Sharma
- Born: April 12, 1968 (age 58); India
- Education: Purdue University; Northwestern University; Oxford University
- Known for: Studies on malaria
- Awards: 2023 CB Sharma Memorial Lecture Award; 2020 Prof. M.G.K. Menon Lecture Award from National Academy of Sciences, India; 2019 Lakshmipat Singhania-IIM Lucknow National Leadership Award; 2018 Om Prakash Bhasin Award; 2015 Infosys Prize; 2011 Shanti Swarup Bhatnagar Prize; 2009 Goyal prize; 2007 N-BIOS Prize; 2007 Prof. Umakant Sinha Memorial Award; 2007 Dr M. O. T. Iyengar National Science Award
- Scientific career
- Fields: Structural parasitology
- Workplaces: International Centre for Genetic Engineering and Biotechnology; Trinity College, Oxford

Amit Prakash Sharma (born April 12, 1968) is an Indian parasitologist and former director of National Institute of Malaria Research, New Delhi. He is known for his studies on the disease of malaria and is an elected fellow of the Indian Academy of Sciences, Indian National Science Academy, The World Academy of Sciences and the National Academy of Sciences, India. He has been awarded the Shanti Swarup Bhatnagar Award in Biological Sciences, JC Bose Fellowship, Ranbaxy Science Research Award, Infosys Science Award in Biological Sciences, Om Prakash Bhasin Award in Biological Sciences and Lakshmipat Singhania- IIM Lucknow National Leadership Award.

== Biography ==
Amit Sharma was born on April 12, 1968, in India. He grew up in New Delhi and attended Delhi Public School, Mathura Road. Later, he went to U.S. for his undergraduate studies to Purdue University, did his master's and PhD at Northwestern University. He received a PhD in protein crystallography in 1995. He was an Elected Research Fellow at St. John's College, Oxford, and taught at St John's and Trinity Colleges (1996–2000). On his return to India in 2001, he joined as a Group Leader of the Structural Parasitology group in the Molecular Medicine division of the International Centre for Genetic Engineering and Biotechnology, New Delhi, and a J. C. Bose National Fellow. From 2019 to 2022 he was Director of the ICMR–National Institute of Malaria Research, New Delhi. In 2022 he was appointed Distinguished Visiting Professor at the Indian Institute of Technology Bombay. He has served on the Council of the Indian National Science Academy and on the research advisory committees of the Bose Institute, Kolkata, IISER Thiruvananthapuram and the Indian Council of Medical Research. In 2026 he was appointed to the Advisory Board of the Real Time Governance Society, Government of Andhra Pradesh.

== Legacy ==
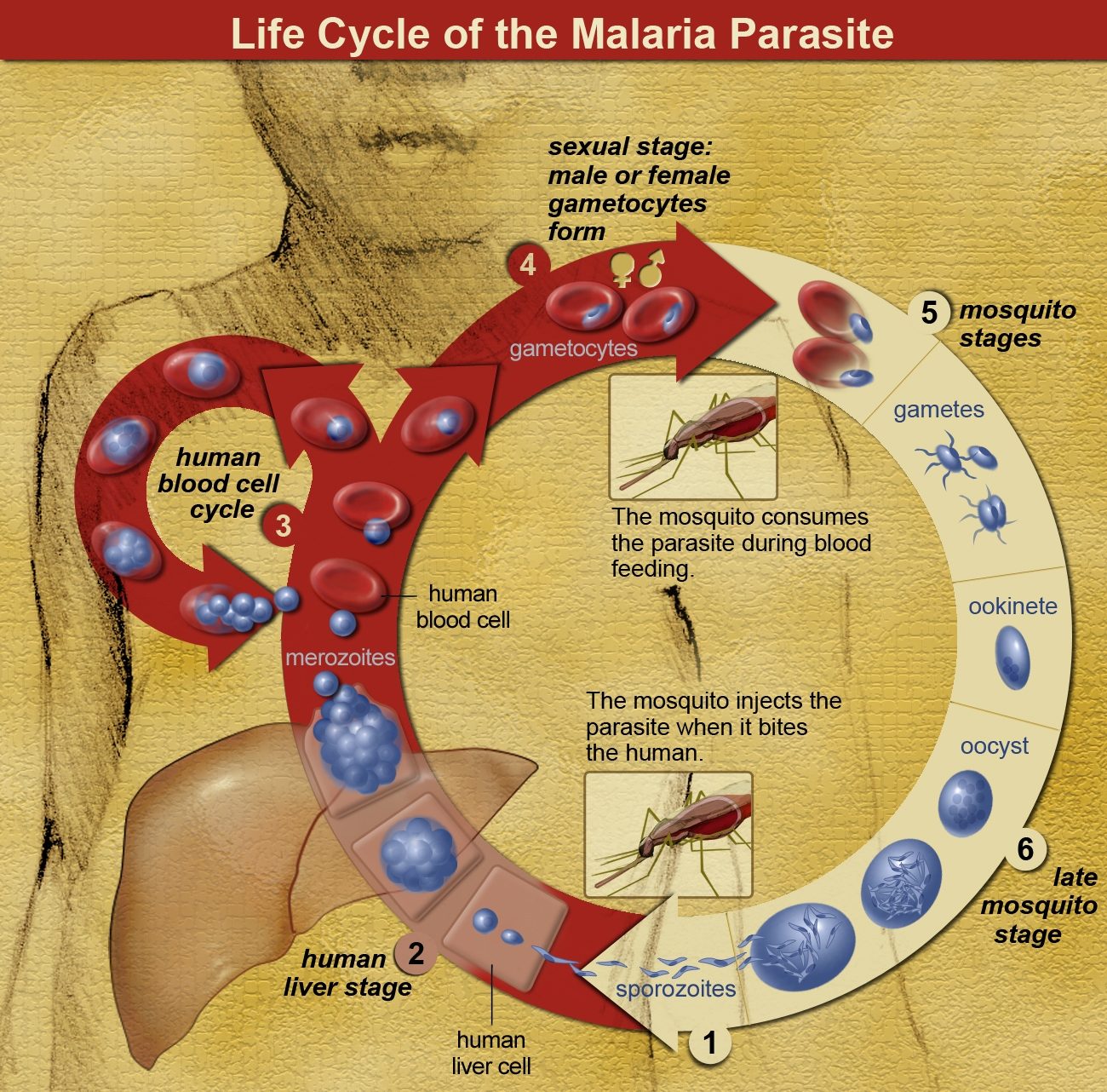
Life cycle of the malaria parasite

Sharma's research is focused in the field of structural parasitology, and he has carried out advanced research in malaria parasite biology. He led the ICGEB group of scientists who collaborated with the researchers from the Broad Institute who discovered a new compound, bicyclic azetidine, which showed potential against the Plasmodium parasite that caused malaria.

Sharma's early structural work included the crystal structure of the Plasmodium falciparum gametocyte protein Pfg27 and the structural basis for recognition of the Duffy antigen by the Plasmodium vivax Duffy-binding-like domain, which is relevant to P. vivax vaccine development.

From 2011 his group studied parasite aminoacyl-tRNA synthetases as drug targets, starting with tyrosyl-tRNA synthetase, and later reported structures of prolyl-, lysyl- and phenylalanyl-tRNA synthetases bound to inhibitors, including bicyclic azetidines. In 2017 he proposed "structure-based targeting of orthologous pathogen proteins" for drug discovery against several parasites, and in 2022 his group showed that two different inhibitors can bind prolyl-tRNA synthetase at the same time.

During the COVID-19 pandemic he co-authored a report of multidrug-resistant Candida auris infections in critically ill COVID-19 patients in India , and structural work on an antibody that neutralises SARS-CoV-2 Omicron variants.

As Director of NIMR he led the development of the NIMR Malaria Dashboard, a digital platform for analysing malaria surveillance data in India,and published on malaria elimination strategy, the links between malaria and malnutrition, and climate zones as a factor in malaria epidemiology.

His studies have been documented by way of a number of articles. Sharma has published more than 250 research papers and book chapters. His papers have appeared in journals including Nature, Science Translational Medicine, Nature Communications, Science Advances, Structure, PLOS Pathogens and The Lancet Regional Health – Southeast Asia.PublicationsList, an online repository of scientific articles, has listed several of them. Sharma has delivered keynote or invited speeches at many conferences and sits on the editorial board of Proceedings of the National Academy of Sciences, India for Section B - Biological Sciences.

== Awards and honors ==
Sharma is an elected fellow of four of India's national science academies and of The World Academy of Sciences:

- National Academy of Sciences, India (NASI), 2006
- Indian Academy of Sciences (IASc), 2012
- The World Academy of Sciences (TWAS), 2015
- Indian National Science Academy (INSA), 2016
- National Academy of Medical Sciences (NAMS), 2022

He has received various national and international honours:

- 1990–1991 – Howard Hughes Medical Institute Undergraduate Summer Research Fellowship
- 1993–1995 – U.S. National Institutes of Health National Research Scholarship
- 1996–2000 – Elected Research Fellow, St John's College, Oxford
- 2001–2006 – Wellcome Trust International Senior Research Fellowship
- 2006 – B. M. Birla Science Prize in Biological Sciences
- 2006 – Bachawat Memorial Award in Biomedical Sciences
- 2006 – Fellow, National Academy of Sciences, India
- 2007 – Prof. Umakant Sinha Memorial Award, Indian Science Congress Association
- 2007 – Dr M. O. T. Iyengar National Science Award for Biomedical Research, ICMR
- 2007/2008 – National Bioscience Award for Career Development, Department of Biotechnology
- 2008 – S. Jaswant Singh Rai Memorial Award in Life Sciences
- 2009 – Goyal Prize
- 2010 – Platinum Jubilee Lecture Award, Indian Science Congress Association
- 2011 – Shanti Swarup Bhatnagar Prize for Science and Technology, Biological Sciences
- 2012 – Fellow, Indian Academy of Sciences
- 2014 – J. C. Bose National Fellowship, Government of India
- 2014 – Ranbaxy Research Award in Medical Sciences (presented March 2015)
- 2015 – Infosys Prize in Life Sciences
- 2015 – Fellow, The World Academy of Sciences
- 2016 – Fellow, Indian National Science Academy
- 2017 – Asian Scientist 100
- 2017 – Selected for the Royal Society Commonwealth Science Conference
- 2018 – Om Prakash Bhasin Award for Science and Technology, Biological Sciences
- 2019 – Lakshmipat Singhania–IIM Lucknow National Leadership Award (15th edition, presented by the President of India in New Delhi on 9 December 2019)
- 2019 – Oration Award, ICMR–National Institute of Pathology
- 2020 – Prof. M. G. K. Menon Lecture Award, National Academy of Sciences, India
- 2022 – Elected Fellow, National Academy of Medical Sciences
- 2022 – Distinguished Visiting Professor, IIT Bombay
- 2023 – C. B. Sharma Memorial Lecture Award, IIT Roorkee
- 2025 – J. C. Bose Grant (ANRF/SERB) for structural biology
- 2025 – Wellcome Trust Grant for epidemiology of dengue and zika infection
