= Rajinder K Dhamija =

Indian neurologist

Rajinder K. Dhamija
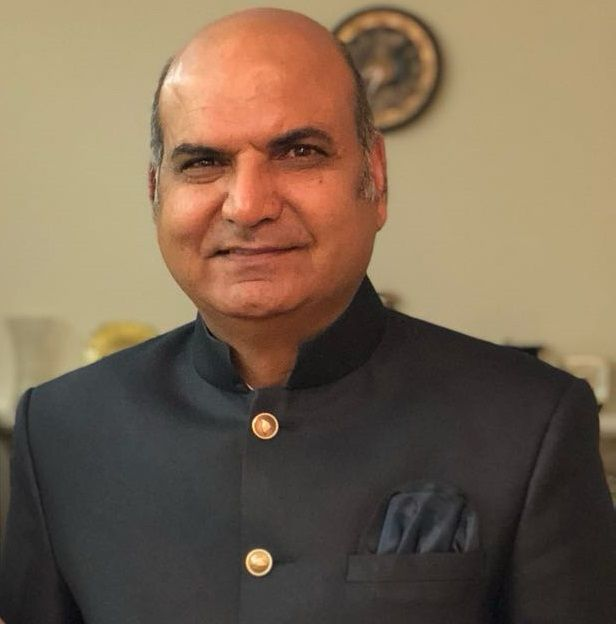
- Prof. Rajinder K. Dhamija at IHBAS, New Delhi
- Citizenship: Indian
- Education: MBBS, MD, DNB (Neurology), FRACP from Medical College Rohtak
- Occupations: Director, IHBAS Neurologist, Academic, Health activist
- Known for: Stroke research; Movement disorders; Neuropalliative care
- Awards: S. Radhakrishnan Memorial National Medical Teacher Award; National Award for Science and Technology (2021)
- Scientific career
- Workplaces: Institute of Human Behaviour and Allied Sciences (IHBAS); Lady Hardinge Medical College

Prof. Rajinder K. Dhamija is an Indian neurologist, health activist, researcher, and academician from New Delhi. He has been director of the Institute of Human Behaviour and Allied Sciences (IHBAS), Delhi, since 2022.

== Early life and education ==
Dhamija obtained his MBBS and MD from Medical College Rohtak. He subsequently obtained further qualifications including the Diplomate of National Board (Neurology), India. He was a WHO Fellow at the National Institute of Epidemiology, Chennai.

== Career ==
Dhamija’s work spans stroke epidemiology, movement disorders neurorehabilitation and mental health. Dhamija established the Department of Neurology at Lady Hardinge Medical College (LHMC), New Delhi, and was its head before becoming director of IHBAS. He was additional personal physician to the Prime Minister of India between 2002-2014.

He has published more than 140 peer-reviewed research papers and book chapters.

Dhamija has been an expert /advisory member for several organizations including WHO, EAN, NHRC, NIMHR, UPSC, J & K Public Service Commission, ICMR, UGC, DMC and National Medical Commission.

== Public engagement ==
Dhamija was leading IHBAS when it launched the National Tele-MANAS Programme, telecare for mental health in Delhi, in 2022.

In 2024, he was appointed as lead on the National Task Force on Brain Health.

He advocates for mental health and brain health for public health awareness and outreach on All India Radio and various national television and print media platforms.

Dhamija has advocated for public health awareness. He has hosted over 400 health education shows on All India Radio and national television, written columns for leading newspapers, and frequently appears in media programmes.

== Selected publications ==
- Dhamija, RK; Donnan, GA (November 2007). "Time is brain--acute stroke management". Australian Family Physician. 36 (11): 892–5. PMID 18043773.
- Dhamija, Rajinder K; Saluja, Alvee (November 2021). "Challenges in estimating the burden of neurological disorders across Indian states". The Lancet Global Health. 9 (11): e1503. doi:10.1016/S2214-109X(21)00413-7. PMID 34678190.
- Garg, Divyani; Dhamija, RajinderK (2020). "Teleneurorehabilitation for Parkinson's Disease: A Panacea for the Times to Come?". Annals of Indian Academy of Neurology. 23 (5): 592–597. doi:10.4103/aian.AIAN_566_20. PMC 7887501. PMID 33623256.
- Dhamija, Rajinder K; Saluja, Alvee (September 2022). "Seizures Associated with Cerebrovascular Disease: Experience from an Indian Tertiary Care Center". Neurology India. 70 (5): 2279–2280. doi:10.4103/0028-3886.359168. PMID 36352676.
- Sharma, Prerna; Baruah, Upasana; Yadav, Akanksha; Kushwaha, Suman; Dhamija, Rajinder K. (May 2024). "Understanding Psychosocial Functioning, Caregiver Burden, and Neuropalliative Care in Parkinson's Disease – A Mixed-Methods Study". Annals of Indian Academy of Neurology. 27 (3): 289–296. doi:10.4103/aian.aian_83_24. PMC 11232814. PMID 38902870.
