= Digital Health Mission =

Digital Health Mission may refer to these initiatives of the government of India:

- Ayushman Bharat Digital Mission, under the Ayushman Bharat health programme
- Pradhan Mantri Digital Health Mission, under the prime minister's office
