= Justin Rhodes =

American psychologist

Justin S. Rhodes
- Born: New York City, United States
- Education: University of Wisconsin–Madison (PhD 2002), Stanford University
- Scientific career
- Fields: Psychology, neuroscience
- Institutions: University of Illinois Urbana-Champaign
- Doctoral advisor: Theodore Garland, Jr.

Justin S. Rhodes is an American neuroscientist. He is a professor in the Department of Psychology at the University of Illinois Urbana-Champaign. His lab investigates a broad array of topics in the field of neuroscience with particular emphasis in exercise-induced hippocampal neurogenesis, neural circuitry involved in addictive behaviors, and brain plasticity in clownfish.

== Early life and education ==
After receiving a Bachelor of Science in biology at Stanford University, Rhodes obtained a PhD in zoology in 2002 from University of Wisconsin–Madison, under the supervision of Theodore Garland, Jr. After completing a postdoctoral fellowship at Oregon Health & Science University, he held a position as an instructor at Lewis & Clark College for a year before accepting a full-time faculty position in 2005 in the biological division of the Department of Psychology at the University of Illinois.

== Research ==
Rhodes research interests relate to neuronal plasticity. One interest includes understanding the role of voluntary exercise via wheel running in inducing the formation of new neurons in the dentate gyrus of the hippocampus. A major goal of this research would be to understand the biological organization, from gene and protein expressions, that regulate neurogenesis in the hippocampus.

Rhodes was one of the developers of the Drinking in the Dark model in mice. In this model, a specific mouse strain is found to voluntarily drink to the levels of intoxication. Many drugs used to treat alcoholism in humans have been shown to lead to reduced ethanol consumption in mice used in this model.

Another interest includes understanding changes in neural circuitry due to drug addiction. Research from his lab has shown that adult and adolescent mice given equal amounts of cocaine display significant differences in locomotor stimulation. His research has also shown that voluntary behaviors such as exercise could activate the same neurobiological pathways as alcohol and drug addiction. Most recently, his lab is investigating the impact of exercise on drug associative learning. As a career project, Rhodes tries to understand the evolution of behavior by selectively breeding for hyperactivity in mice. The overall goal is to identify how genes regulate multiple levels of biological organization.

Currently, Rhodes has also established a marine biology laboratory to research brain plasticity in clownfish undergoing sex change as a result of removal of the largest female from the group.

== Awards and honors ==
- Young Scientist Award, International Behavioural and Neural Genetics Society (2008)
- Evelyn Satinoff Professorial Scholar in Psychology (2013)

== Notable publications ==
- Rhodes, J. S.; Gammie, SC; Garland, Jr, T (2005). "Neurobiology of mice selected for high voluntary wheel-running activity". Integrative and Comparative Biology. 45 (3): 438–55. doi:10.1093/icb/45.3.438. PMID 21676789.
- Rhodes, Justin S; Crabbe, John C (2005). "Gene expression induced by drugs of abuse". Current Opinion in Pharmacology. 5 (1): 26–33. doi:10.1016/j.coph.2004.12.001. PMID 15661622.
- Rhodes, JS; Ford, MM; Yu, CH; Brown, LL; Finn, DA; Garland, Jr, T; Crabbe, JC (2007). "Mouse inbred strain differences in ethanol drinking to intoxication". Genes, Brain and Behavior. 6 (1): 1–18. doi:10.1111/j.1601-183X.2006.00210.x. PMID 17233637.
- Clark, P.J.; Brzezinska, W.J.; Thomas, M.W.; Ryzhenko, N.A.; Toshkov, S.A.; Rhodes, J.S. (2008). "Intact neurogenesis is required for benefits of exercise on spatial memory but not motor performance or contextual fear conditioning in C57BL/6J mice". Neuroscience. 155 (4): 1048–58. doi:10.1016/j.neuroscience.2008.06.051. PMID 18664375. S2CID 15051523.
- Rhodes, J. S.; Kawecki, T. (2009). "Behavior and Neurobiology". In Garland, T.; M. R. Rose (eds.). Experimental Evolution. University of California Press. pp. 263–300.
- Zombeck, J.A.; Lewicki, A.D.; Patel, K.; Gupta, T.; Rhodes, J.S. (2010). "Patterns of neural activity associated with differential acute locomotor stimulation to cocaine and methamphetamine in adolescent versus adult male C57BL/6J mice". Neuroscience. 165 (4): 1087–99. doi:10.1016/j.neuroscience.2009.11.038. PMC 2814970. PMID 19932887.
- Clint, E.K.; Sober, E.; Garland, T. Jr.; Rhodes, J.S. (2012). "Male superiority in spatial navigation". The Quarterly Review of Biology. 87 (4): 289–313. doi:10.1086/668168. PMID 23397795. S2CID 1001894.
