= DMRC =

DMRC may refer to:

- Dr Mahabubur Rahman Mollah College, Dhaka, Bangladesh
- Delhi Metro Rail Corporation
- Desert Medicine Research Centre
- DMRC Headley Court, a United Kingdom Ministry of Defence facility in Headley, Surrey, England
