= Rajendra Memorial National Institute of Health Research =

Medical college in Patna, Bihar

ICMR–Rajendra Memorial National Institute of Health Research
- Type: Research Institution
- Established: 1963; 63 years ago
- Parent institution: Indian Council of Medical Research
- Affiliations: University of Calcutta
- Director: Dr. Krishna Pandey
- Location: Agam Kuan, Sadikpur, Patna, Bihar, 800007, India; 25.5997386°N 85.1966277°E
- Website: www.rmrims.org.in
- Location in Patna Rajendra Memorial National Institute of Health Research (India)

The Rajendra Memorial National Institute of Health Research (ICMR-RM NIHR), which is located at Agam Kuan, Patna, Bihar, India is a permanent research institute of the Indian Council of Medical Research, New Delhi and an autonomous body of Ministry of Health and Family Welfare, Government of India.

== Location ==
It is located at Agamkuan in the eastern part of the city of Patna. It has an area of nine acres.

== Research ==
Its main thrust is research in different aspects of Visceral leishmaniasis also known as kala-azar, black fever and Dumdum fever.

== History ==
It is named after the memory of the first president of Republic of India, Dr. Rajendra Prasad. After the demise of Dr. Prasad due to chest disease in Bihar, an institute in the memory of his name focus on chest diseases was established. Thus, the RMRIMS was established on 3 December 1963.

In October 2008, RMRIMS entered into an agreement with the prestigious University of Calcutta, whereby, doctoral candidates of RMRIMS would be supervised by University of Calcutta faculty. The institute has been accorded affiliation by University of Calcutta for Ph.D and other academic activities.

With this, now the students of Bihar have a choice to conduct their research work under University of Calcutta while working at RMRIMS, Patna. It would help in stopping local students from going to Kolkata or other places for better academic institutions.

A few decades ago, the institute did a yeoman's job in inventing medicines for coal mine workers of Dhanbad. Pioneered by Dr. (Late) Harkirat Singh, the institute invented a medicine for coal miners' pneumoconiosis, an illness very similar to asthma.

== See also ==
- Education in India
- National Institute for Implementation Research on Non-Communicable Diseases
