= National Cancer Control Programme =

With the emergence of cancer as a growing threat to public health, the Indian Government, through the Ministry of Health and Family Welfare, initiated the National Cancer Control Programme (NCCP) in 1975.

== History ==
Initially, the focus of the programme was prevention as its aim was to educate the population and make detection and diagnosis resources available. Another goal for the programme was to increase capacity in the structures already dealing with cancer and address the short fallings of palliative care. The programme was subsequently revised between 1984 and 1985 to better set it up for success in its goal of reducing cancer morbidity and mortality in the country, mainly through primary prevention and early detection. Between 1990 and 1991, the cancer control programme was decentralised with the introduction of services at the district level. The last revision on the NCCP intervened in 2005.

== Achievements ==
Since its creation, the programme has had many major accomplishments such as the establishment of the National Cancer Registry Programme in 1982. Even though the registry does not cover the whole population affected by cancer, it gives the most updated information on the burden of cancer in the country and informs policies enacted to fight against cancer such as provisions for additional funding to public hospitals and the creation of cancer centres in 27 regions. Through the National Cancer Control Programme, the country was able to put in place effective policies to foster primary prevention such as a tobacco control policy to minimise the negative impacts of the use of tobacco. The country also disposes of policies to control and prevent obesity and alcohol use disorder, and policies to foster physical activity and ensure that is available for everyone. Cancer screening and early detection services are generally offered in public health centres, especially for breast and cervical cancer. The NCCP led to the creation of 27 cancer centres across the country, and 85 additional oncology programmes in medical schools.

== Challenges ==
Despite the successes, the National Cancer Control Programme is faced with numerous challenges. Accessibility, availability, and affordability of cancer care resources remain a major issue faced by the programme. Problems of access are due to lack of financial means to afford the resources that are available or the lack of financial to make the decisions that would reduce the risks of developing the disease. These include lifestyle decisions such as smoking, alcohol consumption, and nutrition patterns. Availability is a major problem particularly in rural areas because the resources are concentrated in cities and solving the geographical gap between resources such as facilities and personal remains a challenge for the NCCP.
