= Arogyavani =

Health helpline by Karnataka Government

- Country: India
- Ministry: Ministry of Health and Family Welfare
- Key people: U. T. Khader
- Launched: 30 June 2013; 13 years ago IT Park, Hubli, Karnataka.
- Status: Active

Arogyavani is an initiative first conceptualized and implemented by the Government of Karnataka. It is a toll-free health helpline number (Dial to 104) functioning 24/7 hrs for the convenience of general public. Arogyavani Health Information Helpline provides medical advice, health related schemes launched by various governments, and health counseling services.

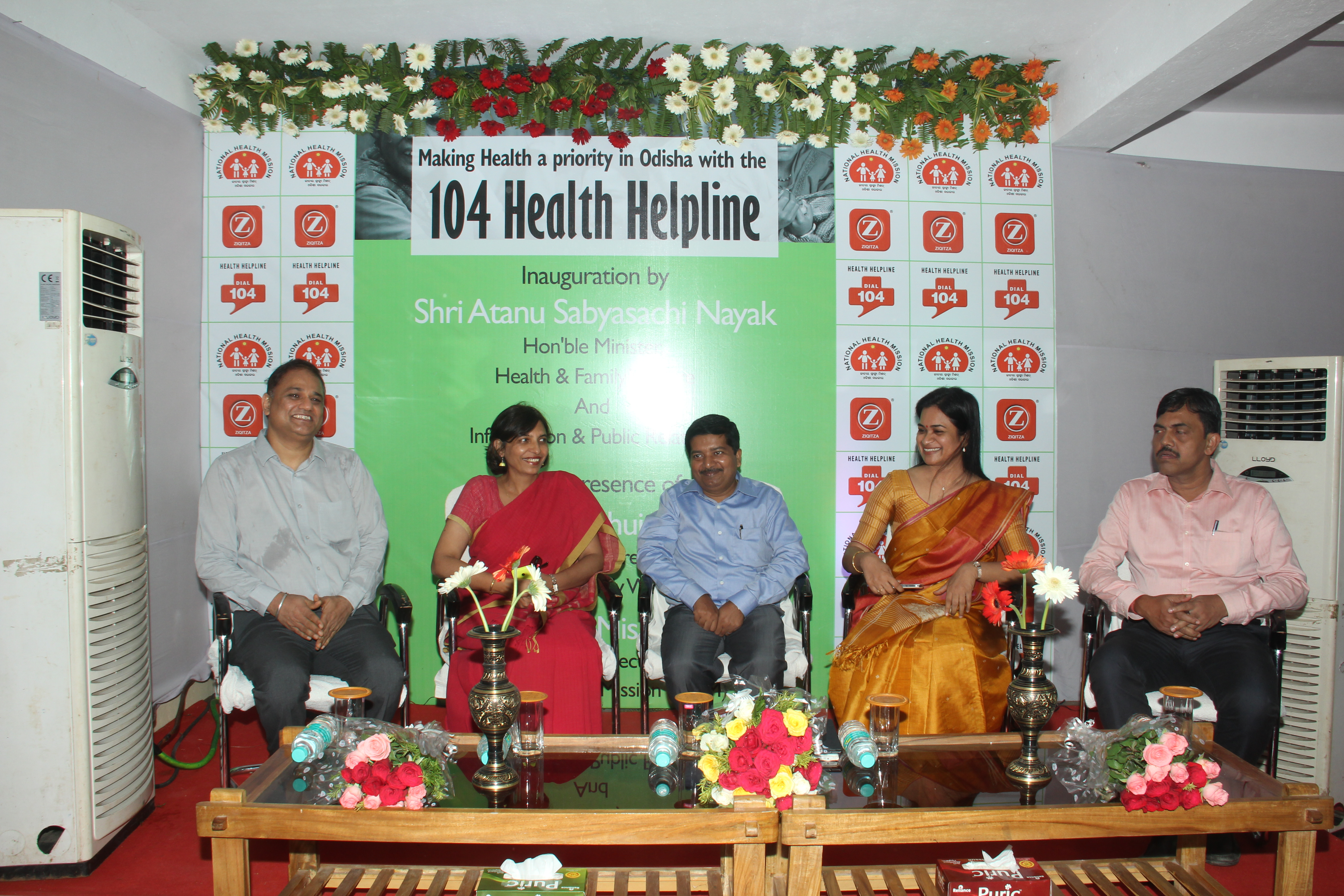
A still from the launch event of 104 Health Helpline Number in the state of Odisha.

== Presence in other States of India ==
After its success in Karnataka in agreement with Piramal Swasthya, the Government of Punjab started a 104 medical helpline call centre by entering into an agreement with Ziqitza Healthcare Limited from June 2014. In the state of Punjab, the services under the Arogyavani initiative are available in three languages namely Punjabi, Hindi and English. In its first year, the 104 medical helpline served for 47,476 people in the state of Punjab.

In the state of Odisha and Chhattisgarh, Ziqitza Healthcare Limited operates 104 health helpline number through tender processing under Public Private Partnership (PPP) with National Health Mission (NHM). The other states where 104 non-emergency medical helpline number is active are Assam, Chhattisgarh, Jharkhand, Gujarat, Rajasthan, Tamil Nadu, Telangana, and Madhya Pradesh.

== Objective ==
The main objective of the "104" medical helpline telephone number is to provide medical information and advice on health related services to the members of the general public who call seeking answers and/or resolution for health-related areas. Services:

- Information directory for tracking health service providers/ institutions, diagnostic services, hospitals, etc.
- Complaint registration about persons/ institutions relating to deficiency of service, negligence, corruption, etc., in government healthcare institutions.
- Advice on long term medical conditions like diabetes, heart trouble, etc.
- Response to health scares and other localized epidemics.
- Counselling and advice (stress, depression, anxiety, post-trauma recovery, HIV, AIDS, RTI, STI, etc.)
- Health and symptoms checker (initial assessment, flu advice, pregnancy related information, etc.)
- First aid information and advice.
- Any other health related service/ issues.
