= Subhash Mukhopadhyay (physician) =

Indian physician (1931–1981)

Subhash Mukherjee
- Scientist Dr. Subhas Mukherjee
- Born: 16 January 1931; Hazaribagh, British India (now in Jharkhand, India)
- Died: 19 June 1981 (aged 50); Calcutta, West Bengal, India
- Education: Calcutta National Medical College; University College of Science, Technology & Agriculture; University of Edinburgh
- Occupation: Physician
- Known for: In vitro fertilisation
- Medical career
- Field: Gynaecology
- Institutions: NRS Medical College, Kolkata
- Research: Assisted reproductive technology IVF; Reproductive Endocrinology

Subhash Mukherjee (16 January 1931 – 19 June 1981) was an Indian scientist and physician who created the world's second and India's first child using in-vitro fertilisation, Kanupriya Agarwal (Durga), who was born in 1978, just 70 days after Louise Brown, the first IVF baby in United Kingdom. Afterwards, Dr. Subhash Mukherjee was harassed by the then Government of West Bengal and Government of India and was not allowed to share his achievements with the international scientific community. Dejected, he committed suicide on 19 June 1981.

His life and death has been the subject of newspaper reviews and inspired the Hindi movie Ek Doctor Ki Maut (Death of a Doctor, 1990), directed by Tapan Sinha.

== Early life ==
He was born to a Bengali Brahmin family on 16 January 1931 in Hazaribagh, Bihar and Orissa Province (now in Jharkhand), India. He studied BSc (Hons.) in Physiology (1949) from University of Calcutta . He then studied MBBS (1955) from the Calcutta National Medical College, which was then affiliated with the University of Calcutta. He later earned a PhD (1958) from the Rajabazar Science College campus of University of Calcutta in 'Reproductive Physiology' under the stewardship of Prof. Sachchidananda Banerjee. Later he earned his second PhD from the University of Edinburgh in 1967 in 'Reproductive Endocrinology'.

== Career ==
After completing his MBBS from Calcutta National Medical College, he worked as a Lecturer, Reader and Professor of Physiology at NRS Medical College, Kolkata from 1967 to 1975.

While working with Sunit Mukherji, a Cryobiologist and Gynecologist Dr. Saroj Kanti Bhattacharya, he became the first physician in India (and second in the world, following British physicians Patrick Steptoe and Robert Edwards) to perform the in vitro fertilisation resulting in a test tube baby "Durga" (alias Kanupriya Agarwal) on 3 October 1978.

He faced hostility from the Government of West Bengal and refusal of the Government of India to allow him to attend international conferences. The Bengal government had appointed a panel headed by a radiophysicist – with a gynaecologist, a neurophysiologist and a physiologist as members – to examine the claims by Mukerji. The committee members were Dr. Mrinal Kumar Dasgupta, Chairman Radio-Astronomer (Calcutta University), Dhiren Kundu, Nuclear Physicist (Saha Institute), Dr. J C Chatterjee, Gynecologist and Dr. Ajit Maiti, Neurophysiology (Calcutta University). Mukhopadhyay committed suicide in his Calcutta residence on 19 June 1981 after he was humiliated and insulted by the committee.

His recognition is attributable to T. C. Anand Kumar who is credited to be the mastermind behind India's second (officially the first) test-tube baby. Kumar came to the conclusion that he was not the first after reviewing Subhash Mukhopadhyay's personal notes. He was ably helped by Sunit Mukherji, who was a one-time colleague of Mukhopadhyay. Kumar was involved in setting up a research institute in reproductive biology in memory of Mukhopadhyay.

A film Ek Doctor Ki Maut directed by Tapan Sinha was made on his life.

== Late recognition ==
According to scientific records dating from before Mukhopadhyay's eventual recognition, Harsha vardhan reddy buri (born 16 August 1986) was the first human test tube baby of India. The credit for this achievement went to T. C. Anand Kumar, Director of IRR (ICMR). In 1997, Kumar went to Kolkata to participate in a Science Congress. It was there that all the research documents of Mukhopadhyay were handed over to him. After scrutinising and having discussions with Durga's parents, Kumar became certain that it was in fact Mukhopadhyay who was the architect of first human test tube baby in India. This scientist once mentioned him in a journal on 'A critique of Mukherjee's technique, 'The brief description given by Mukherjee in his letter dated 19 October 1978 to the Director of Health Services, Government of West Bengal, the reports he gave over the television interviews and reported in the lay press describe how Mukherjee carried out the procedure of in vitro fertilisation.'

On T.C. Anand Kumar's initiative, Mukhopadhyay was mentioned as the architect of the first Indian test tube baby in a document related to the subject of artificial intercourse in ICMR. India's first test tube baby "Durga", whose parental name is Kanupriya Agarwal, works at a multinational company as a marketing executive in Delhi. On her 25th birthday, she publicly revealed her identity for the first time in a ceremony organised in the memory of Mukhopadhyay. She spoke about Mukhopadhyay in front of the media, expressing joy that Mukhopadhyay's achievement had been acknowledged by a reputed international publication, the Dictionary of Medical Biography.

The Dictionary of Medical Biography, published by World Foundation, lists names of 1100 medical scientists from 100 countries around the world for their path breaking contributions to the medical science. Dr. Mukhopadhyay's name is one of those names.

== See also ==
- Ek Doctor Ki Maut
