= Taruna Madan Gupta =

Indian scientist

- Born: New Delhi
- Education: Institute of Genomics and Integrative Biology, Medical Research Council (UK)
- Known for: Aspergillosis and innate immunity
- Awards: Indo-US Wiestemm WIS Fellowship 2019; CSIR Young Scientist Award & INSA Young Scientist Award
- Scientific career
- Fields: Innate immunology, Biological Sciences
- Workplaces: National Institute for Research in Reproductive Health, NIRRH-ICMR
- Doctoral advisor: Dr. P. Usha Sarma

Taruna Madan Gupta (Hindi: तरुना मदान गुप्ता) (Taruna Gupta), born on 14 May 1968 in New Delhi, is an Indian scientist F and Head of the Department of Innate Immunity at the National Institute for Research in Reproductive Health (NIRRH) in Mumbai, India. She has extensively worked on Aspergillosis and Lung Surfactant Proteins (SP-A, SP-D), with her research now more focused on role of Innate Immunity in host-pathogen interactions.

== Education and personal life ==
- Bachelor of Pharmacy (B.Pharm.) (year 1989, Gold Medallist) - Delhi Institute for Pharmaceutical Education and Research (DIPER), University of Delhi
- Master of Pharmacy (M.Pharm.) (year 1991, Gold Medallist) - Delhi Institute for Pharmaceutical Education and Research (DIPER), University of Delhi
- Ph.D. - Jointly with Delhi Institute for Pharmaceutical Education and Research (DIPER), University of Delhi and Institute of Genomics and Integrative Biology (IGIB), New Delhi.

Taruna is married to Dr. Sanjeev Kumar Gupta Ph.D. who is an accomplished professional in the area of Medical Device and In Vitro Diagnostic Devices (IVD) and Founder of PUNJ (Psoriasis Undone for New Joy) in India. They have one son, Urit Gupta.

== Professional life ==
- Post-doctoral research on "Role of lung collections in genetic predisposition to aspergillosis" as Senior Research Associate at Institute of Genomics and Integrative Biology (IGIB) (Council of Scientific and Industrial Research, CSIR), Delhi, India.
- Doctoral and post-doctoral research at Medical Research Council (MRC) Immunochemistry Unit, University of Oxford, Oxford, UK (July 1996 - September 1996 and July 2000 - September 2000).
- Scientist "C" in Allergy and Infectious Diseases Department, Institute of Genomics and Integrative Biology (IGIB) (Council of Scientific and Industrial Research, CSIR), Delhi, India (2002–2007)
- Scientist "F" at NIRRH since 2018

== Publications and patents ==
Taruna M. Gupta is a contributing author on over 100 peer-reviewed journal articles, and has been cited over 3000 times. Most of these articles concern the research of fungal aspergilosis and lung surfactant proteins.

She has three patents concerning the identification and treatment of aspergilli.

== Awards and recognition ==
- Received Indo-US Wistemm WIS Fellowship (IUSSTF) (2018). Under fellowship work was done at Brigham & Women's Hospital, Harvard Medical School, Boston, USA
- Young Women Bioscientist award from Indian Science Congress Association (2004).
- Council of Scientific and Industrial Research (CSIR) Young Scientist Award (Category -Life Sciences) (Year 2003).
- Indian National Science Academy (INSA) Young Scientist Medal Award (Category -Medical Sciences) (Year 1998).

Product Development: Developed ELISA kits for detection of Aspergillosis in serum under DBT Task Force
