= National Animal Resource Facility for Biomedical Research =

Indian research institute

- Established: 2015
- Research type: Public
- Budget: ₹338.58 crore (US$35 million)
- Field of research: Animal Biotechnology
- Director: Dr. Mukesh Kumar Gupta
- Location: Turkapally, Hyderabad, Telangana, India, India 500101; 17.6673335°N 78.6139701°E
- Campus: Turkapally
- Operating agency: ICMR
- Website: nipcr.icmr.gov.in

The National Animal Resource Facility for Biomedical Research is an Indian Biomedical research facility, and vivarium under the Indian Council of Medical Research. The new 33rd flagship institute of ICMR was founded in 2015, at Genome Valley in Hyderabad, India. The center is a state of the art Animal house and Animal sciences facility located near Turkapally, Shamirpet spread over 102 acres of land.

The institute proposes to breed specific pathogen free large and small animals such as mice, rats, hamsters, rabbit, guinea pigs, mini pigs, canines, swine, equines, horses, sheep, and goats. Various species of non-human primates such as rhesus, bonnet monkey, cynomolgus monkey, pig tail monkey, owl monkey and squirrel monkey among others needed for research purpose. By tenth year of its functioning, the institute proposes to be self sustainable. The project was conceived way back in 2001. It got delayed due to financial and technical reasons. However, it got impetus in 2015.

== Background ==
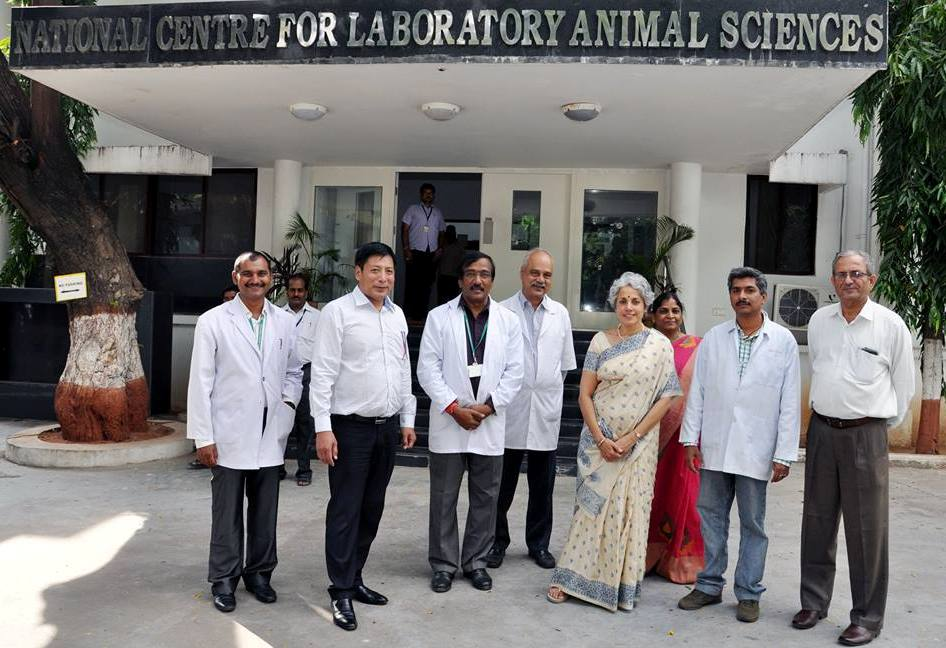
National Center for Laboratory Animal Sciences, Hyderabad

On 18 November 2015 the union Government of India, approved a long-pending proposal envisaging Rs 338.58 crore-world-class-facility for breeding beagle dogs, horses, and monkeys besides other animals on a large scale to indigenously to meet the needs of the country's pharma firms for drug testing and clinical research. Subsequently, The National Center For Laboratory Animal Sciences at the National Institute of Nutrition, Hyderabad is being integrated to form the National Animal Resource Facility for Biomedical Research.

== History ==
"The need for the NARF-BR has been consistently felt as the existing institutes like Central Drug Research Institute, Lucknow and National Institute of Nutrition, Hyderabad are working on small animals, mostly rodents. They cannot meet the demand and requirement of biomedical sector, which has no option but to depend on other countries like Indonesia, Singapore and Malaysia for testing their products," said a senior official from the Ministry of Health and Family Welfare. Sharing the cabinet decision with reporters after the cabinet meeting, Manoj Pant, Joint Secretary of Department of Health Research in the Ministry, "The institute is expected to cut down research cost by 60 per cent and consequently drugs and vaccine by about 30 per cent in the long run." For instance, while presently research experiment cost in US and China is around Rs 2 crore for 180 days, similar tests for the same duration at NARF will cost just Rs 51 lakhs.

== See also ==
- National Institute of Nutrition, Hyderabad
- Education in India
- Literacy in India
- List of institutions of higher education in Telangana
