= Ek Doctor Ki Maut =

- Theatrical release poster
- Directed by: Tapan Sinha
- Written by: Ramapada Chowdhury (story, Abhimanyu); Tapan Sinha (screenplay)
- Based on: Abhimanyu by Ramapada Chowdhury
- Produced by: National Film Development Corporation of India
- Starring: Pankaj Kapur; Shabana Azmi; Anil Chatterjee; Irrfan Khan; Deepa Sahi
- Cinematography: Soumendu Roy
- Edited by: Soumendu Roy
- Music by: Vanraj Bhatia
- Release date: 1990
- Running time: 122 minutes
- Country: India
- Language: Hindi

Ek Doctor Ki Maut (transl. Death of a Doctor) is a 1990 Indian Hindi language drama film by Tapan Sinha, which depicts the ostracism, bureaucratic negligence, reprimand and insult of a doctor and his research, instead of recognition. The film is based on the 1982 Ramapada Chowdhury story Abhimanyu. The movie is loosely based on the life of Dr. Subhash Mukhopadhyay, an Indian physician who pioneered the In vitro fertilisation treatment around the same time when another leading scientist Dr. Robert Edwards was conducting separate experiments in England.

== Plot ==
After years of painstaking research at the cost of his personal life, Dr. Dipankar Roy (Pankaj Kapur) discovers a vaccine for leprosy. The news is splashed over television, and overnight, an insignificant junior doctor receives international recognition. Professional jealousy and abuse of power threaten Dr. Roy, even as the Secretary of Health reprimands him for breaking the news to the press. He is asked to report to the Director of Health. Professional colleague Dr. Ramananda invites him to a lecture via proxies, but it is merely a pretense to humiliate him. Dr. Roy suffers a mild heart attack, but he refuses to go to the hospital. His wife (Shabana Azmi) and a few others like Dr. Kundu (Anil Chatterjee) and Amulya (Irfan Khan) stand by Dr. Roy, but the harassment continues; a letter from a British foundation, the John Anderson Foundation, is suppressed, and Dr. Roy is transferred to a remote village. The last straw is two American doctors receiving credit for discovering the same vaccine. Dr. Roy is shattered.

Dr. Roy gets an invitation from the John Anderson Foundation to be part of an eminent group of scientists working on other diseases. Dr. Roy realises that his research was fruitful. He also decides to accept the invitation, as he just wants to work for the betterment of mankind.

== Cast ==
- Pankaj Kapur as Dr. Dipankar Roy
- Shabana Azmi as Seema
- Anil Chatterjee as Dr. Kundu
- Irrfan Khan as Amulya
- Deepa Sahi
- Vijayendra Ghatge as Dr. Sen
- Sushant Sanyal
- Kaushal Kumar Singh

== Reception ==
The film was greatly applauded by film critics and writers. Tapan Sinha, the director, was inspired by the life and death of Subhash Mukhopadhyay and dedicates this film to him.

== Awards ==
=== 38th National Film Awards, India ===
- 1990 National Film Award for Second Best Feature Film
- 1990 National Film Award for Best Direction: Tapan Sinha
- 1990 National Film Award - Special Jury Award: Pankaj Kapoor (Dr. Dipankar Roy).

=== Bengal Film Journalists' Association Awards ===
- 1991 Best Film
- 1991 Best Director

=== Filmfare Awards ===
- 1992 Filmfare Best Screenplay Award: Tapan Sinha.
