= National Institute of Nutrition, Hyderabad =

Institution in Hyderabad, India

ICMR - National Institute of Nutrition

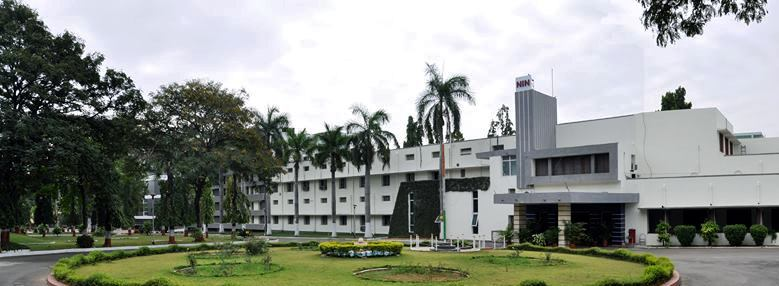
- Established: 1918 (Coonoor); 1958 (Hyderabad)
- Research type: Public
- Budget: ₹6.43 billion (US$69 million)
- Field of research: Nutrition; Micronutrients
- Director: Dr. Bharati Kulkarni
- Location: Jamai-Osmania, Tarnaka, Hyderabad
- Campus: Urban
- Affiliations: K.N.R.U.H.S. N.T.R.U.H.S. University of Hyderabad; Osmania University
- Operating agency: ICMR
- Website: www.nin.res.in

The National Institute of Nutrition (NIN) is an Indian public health, nutrition and translational research centre located in Hyderabad, India. The institute is one of the oldest research centres in India, and the largest centre, under the Indian Council of Medical Research, located in the vicinity of Osmania University. The institute has associated clinical and paediatric nutrition research wards at various hospitals such as the Niloufer Hospital for Women and Children, the Government Maternity Hospital, the Gandhi Hospital and the Osmania General Hospital in Hyderabad.

The National Centre for Laboratory Animal Science (to be integrated into the National Animal Resource Facility for Biomedical Research), the Food and Drug Toxicology Research Centre, the National Nutrition Monitoring Bureau are the other wings of NIN, for India's Ministry of Health and Family Welfare. The institute also derives funding from the Indian Department of Biotechnology. The institute majorly conducts research in obesity, diabetes, food chemistry, dietetics, clinical toxicology, and micronutrient deficiency in collaboration with centres such as the Rockefeller University, University of Colorado School of Medicine, Washington University School of Medicine, and the Johns Hopkins Bloomberg School of Public Health in the US, and the University of Wollongong in Australia.

== History ==
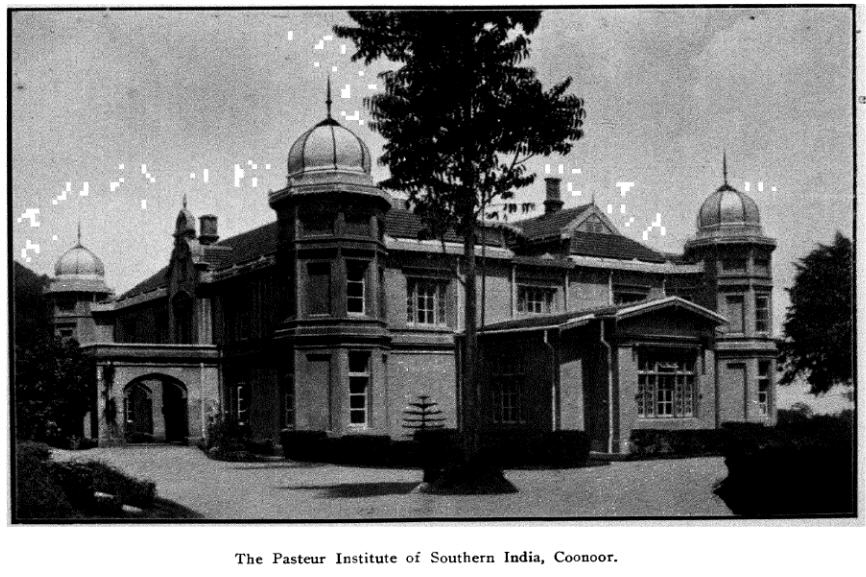
Pasteur Institute at Coonoor in 1927

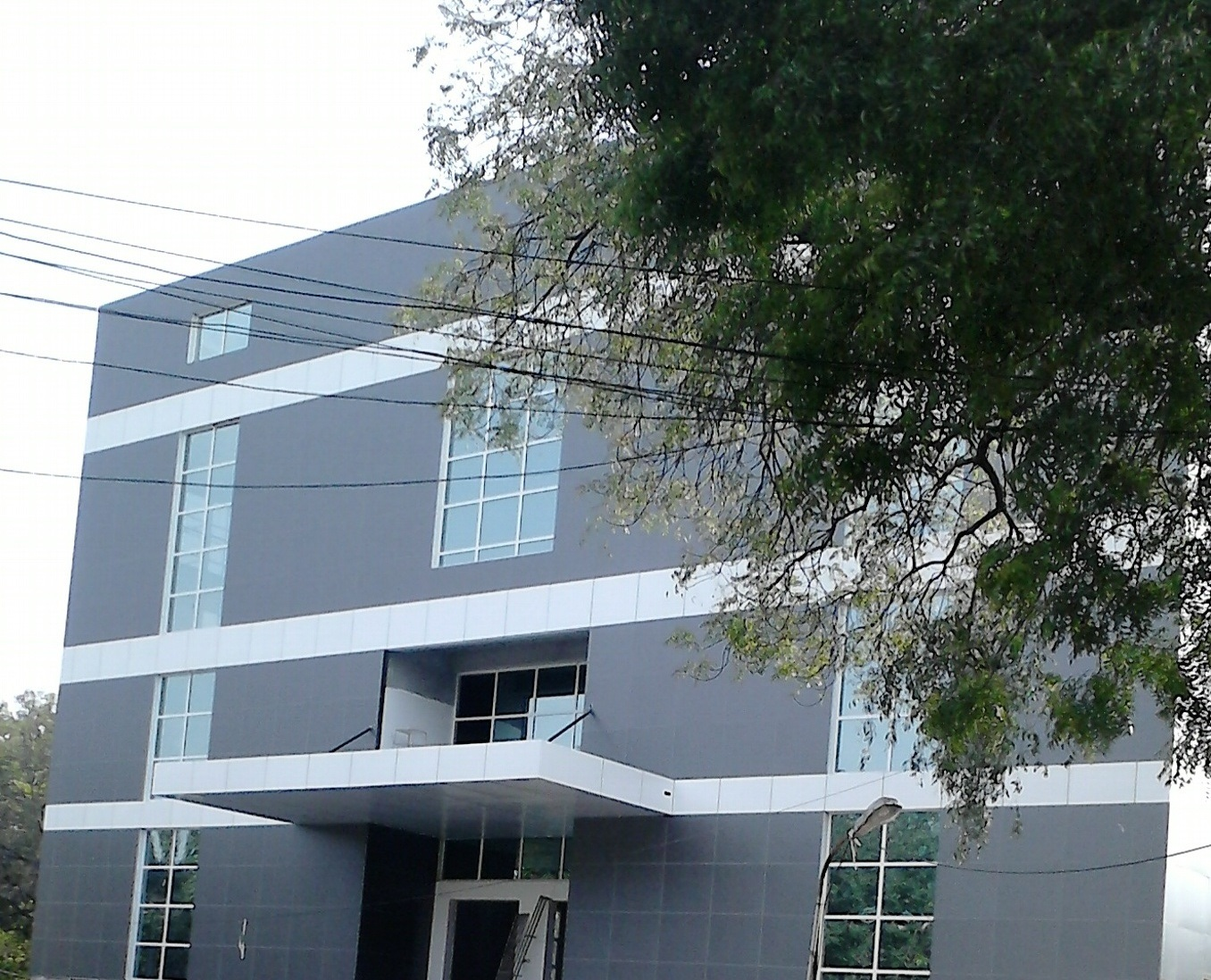
NIN at Hyderabad

The institute was founded in 1918 by Sir Robert McCarrison. It was originally a single room laboratory at the Pasteur Institute, Coonoor, Tamil Nadu for the study of Beriberi, and was called the Beri-Beri Enquiry Unit. McCarrison was invalided to Britain from 1920 to 1922, and in 1923 the enquiry was axed on financial grounds. It was restored two years later as the Deficiency Disease Inquiry, which McCarrison headed from 1925 to 1929. The scope of the laboratory expanded to include all deficiency diseases, and around 1928–1929 became the Nutrition Research Laboratories (NRL), with McCarrison as its first director, until his retirement in 1935, when he was succeeded by Dr. W.R. Ackroyd. The facility moved to Hyderabad in 1958 and in 1969 was renamed the National Institute of Nutrition.

== Research ==
High-throughput sequencing platform – Molecular Biology

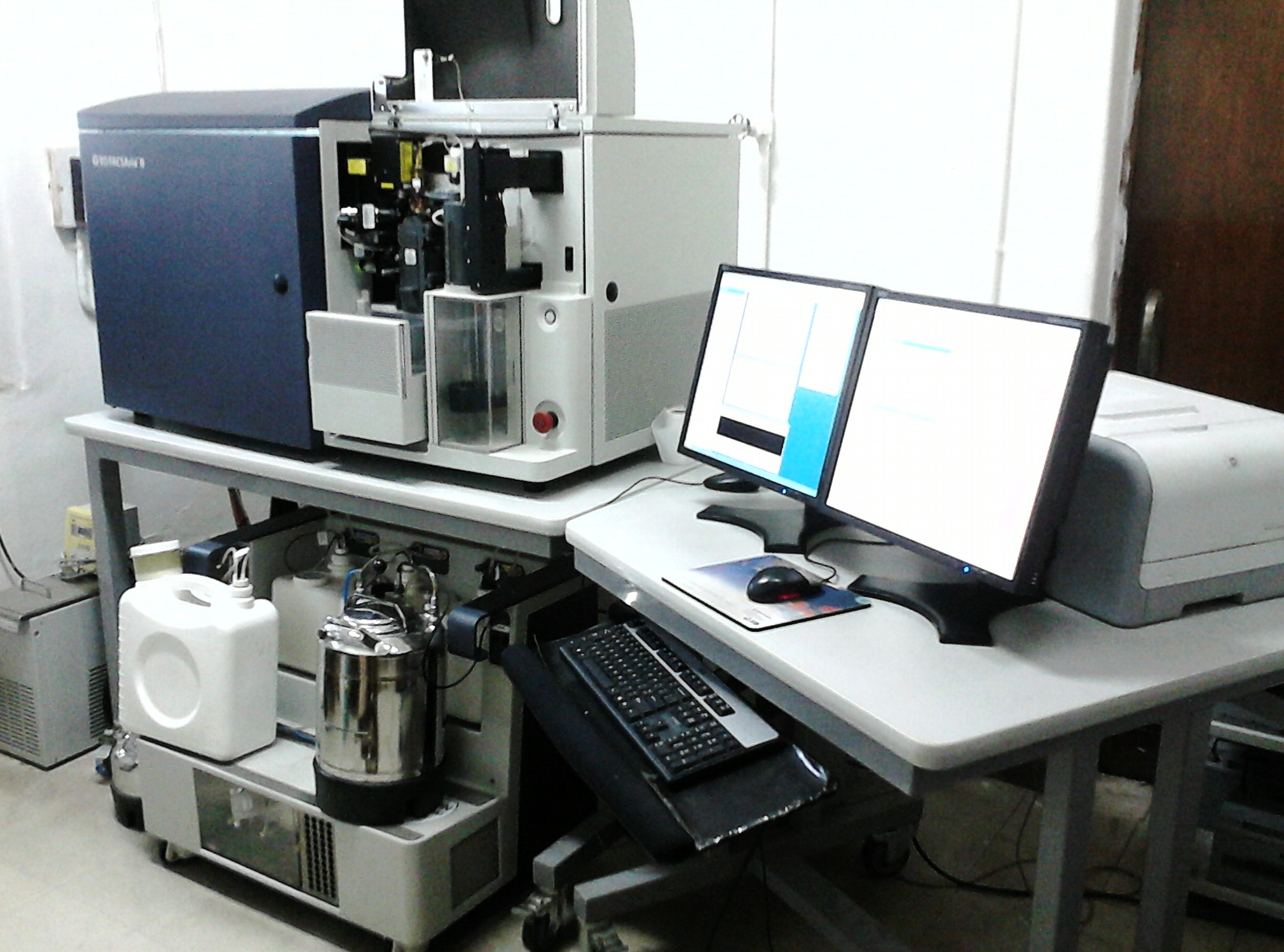
Flow cytometry – Immunology

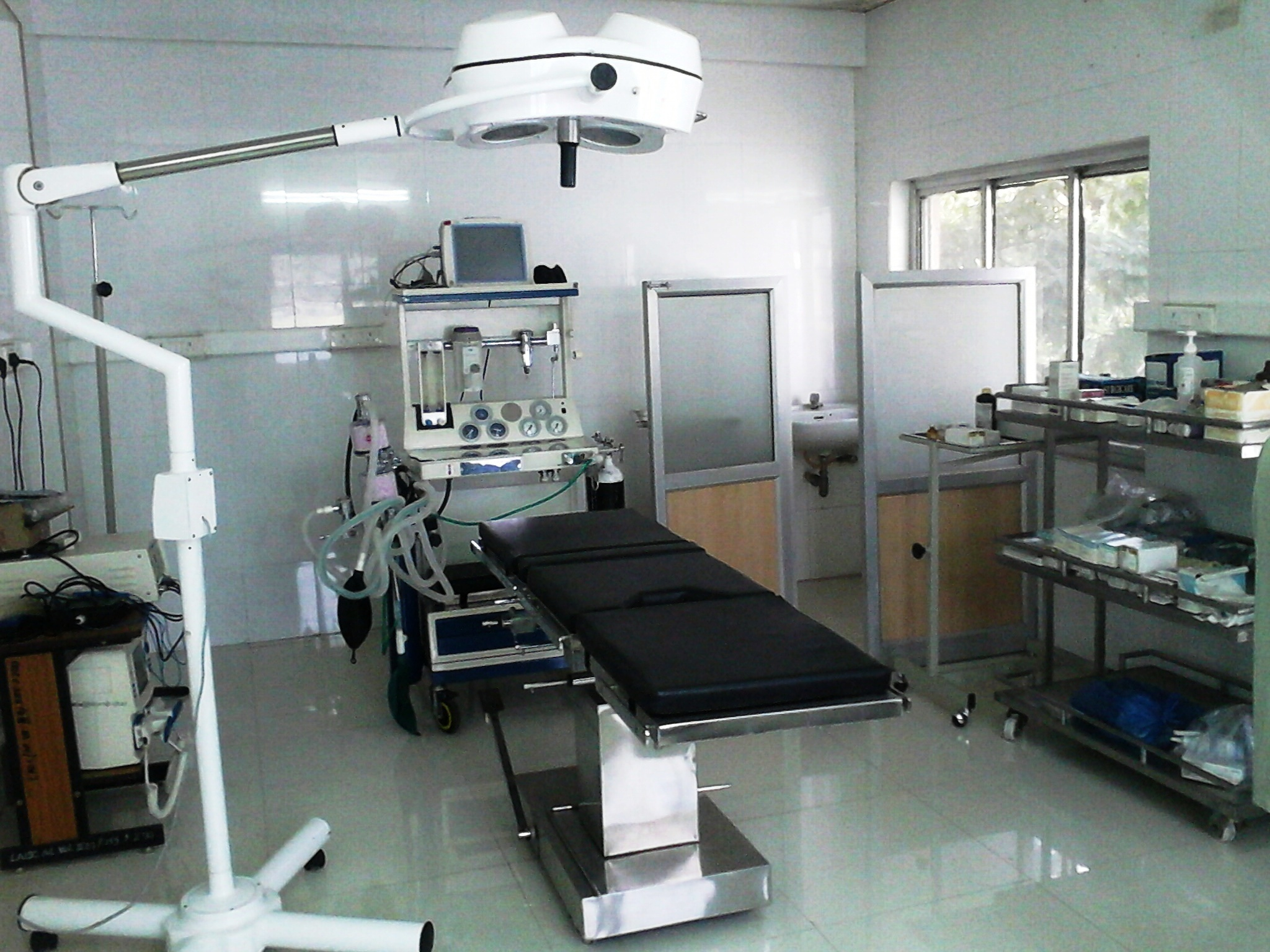
Primate Experimental Medicine & Surgery Unit

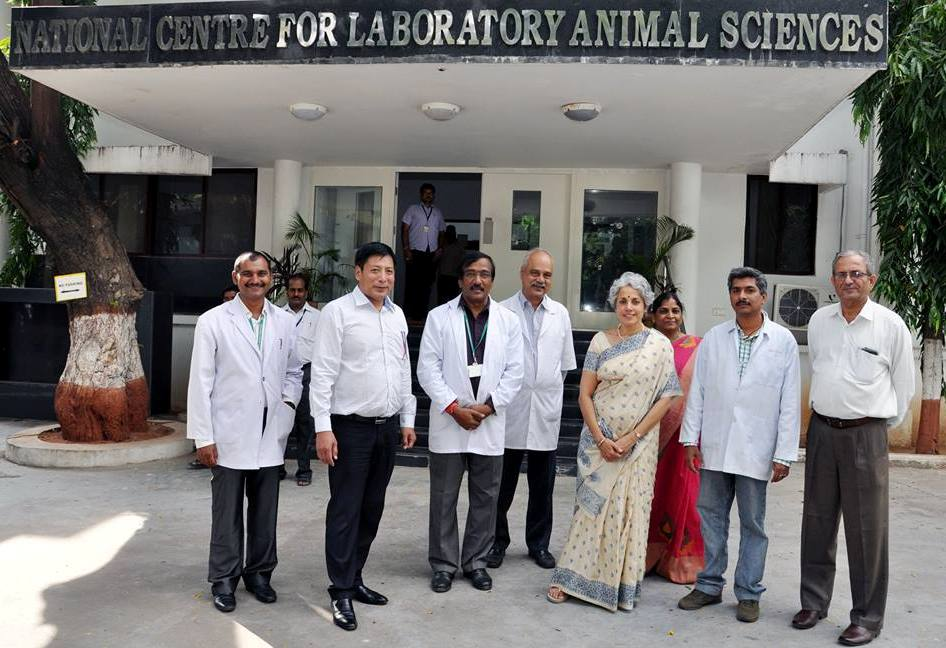
National Center for Laboratory Animal Sciences

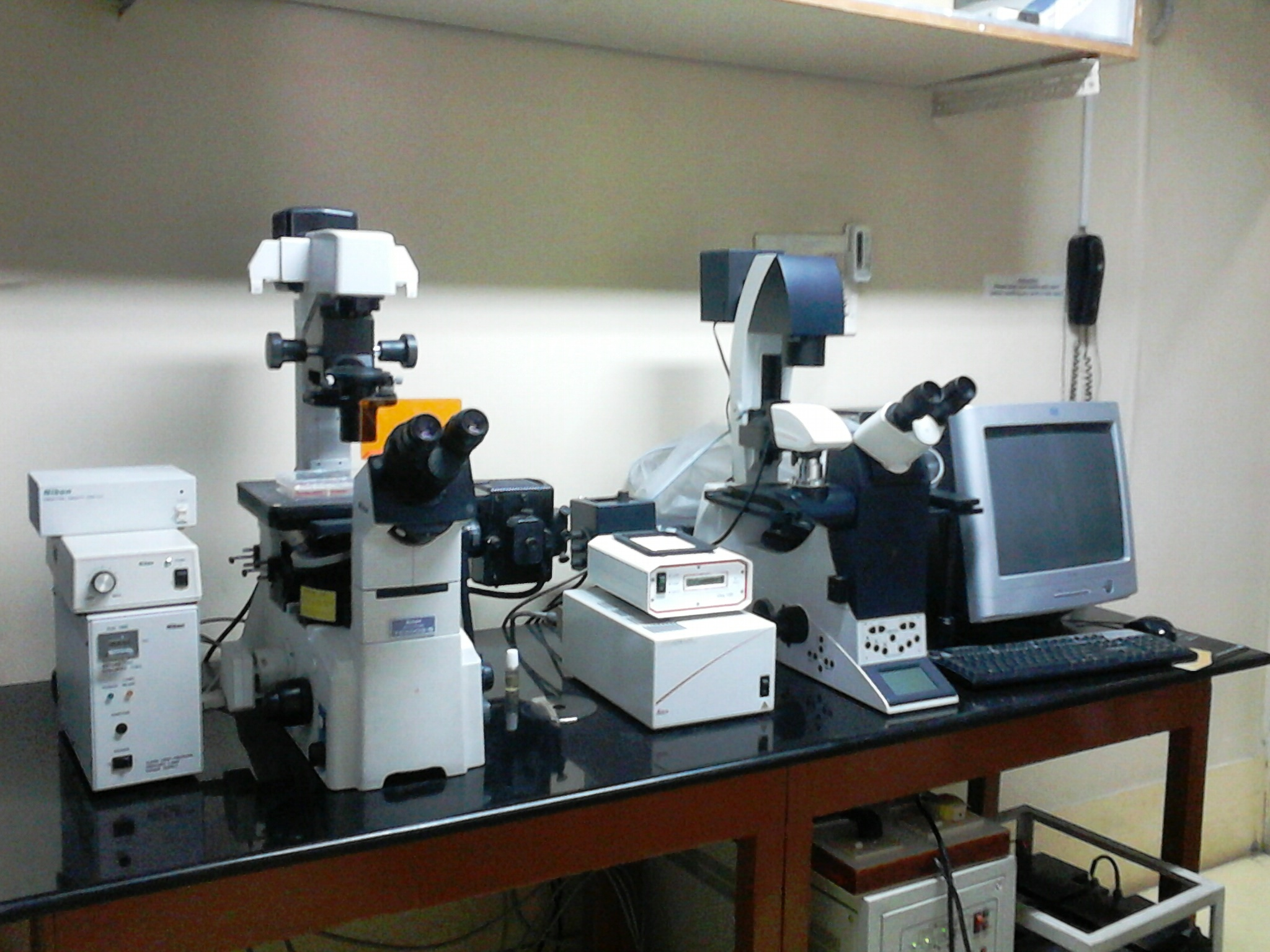
Microscopy – Biochemistry

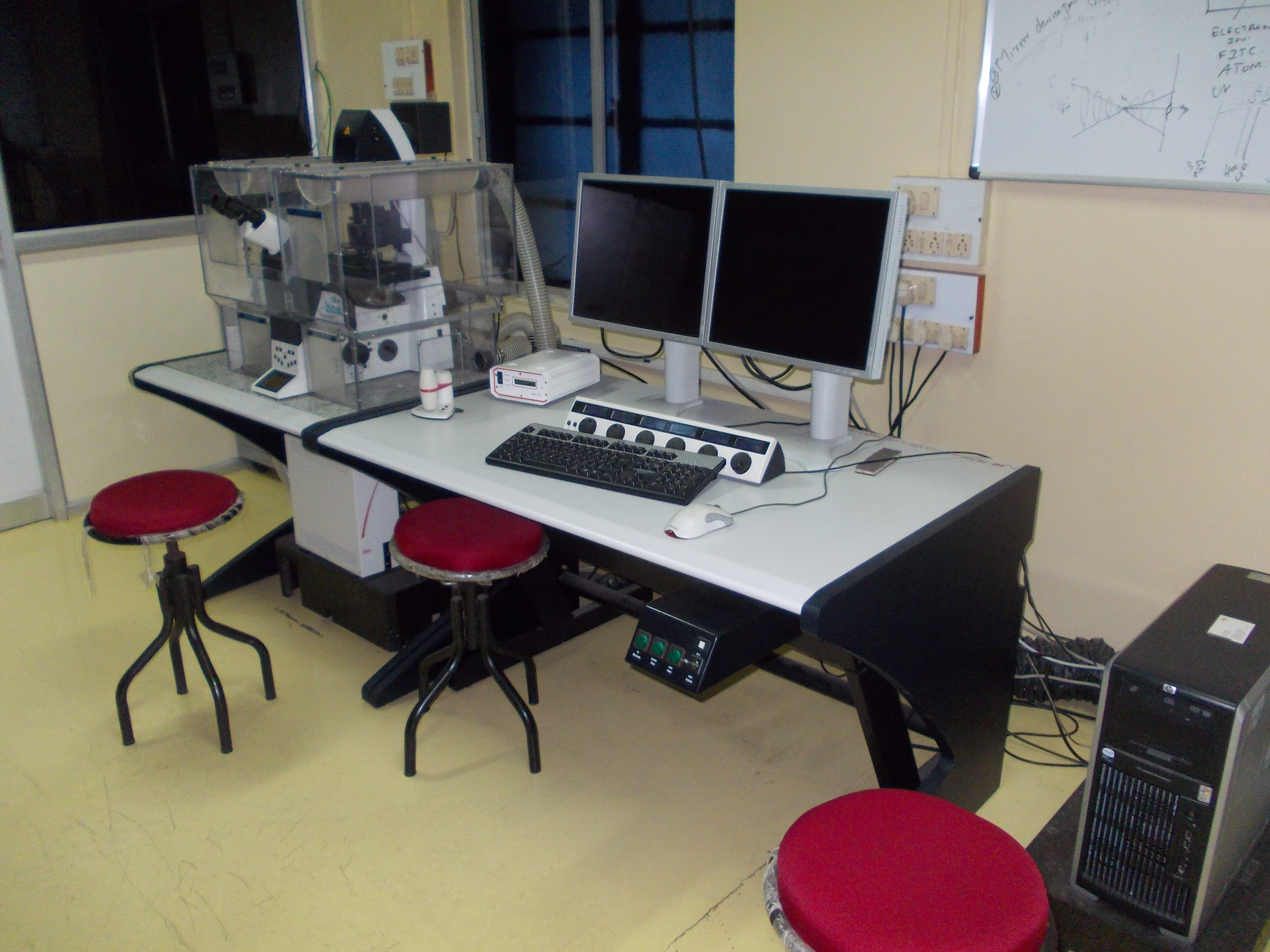
Confocal Microscopy – Biochemistry

The institute carries out research and patent development in clinical nutrition, outcomes research, pharmacology, pathology, toxicology, food chemistry, endocrinology, molecular biology, regenerative medicine, community nutrition, ophthalmology, and sports nutrition. Agencies such as WHO and FAO recognised the institute as a Centre for excellence in food quality, safety and nutrition research.

The institute is equipped with facilities including animal housing, In vivo imaging, automated electrophoresis, flow cytometry, DNA Microarray, liquid chromatography–mass spectrometry, atomic absorption spectroscopy, matrix-assisted laser desorption/ionization, scanning electron microscope, confocal laser scanning microscopy, Transmission electron microscopy, DNA sequencers, cryogenic equipment, thermal cyclers, etc.

== National Centre for Laboratory Animal Sciences ==
The National Centre for Laboratory Animal Sciences (NCLAS) was established in India in 1957 for spreading knowledge on Care, Breeding, Management and Experimentation using laboratory animals in biomedical research. It started as a unit called Laboratory Animal Information Service (LAIS) at the Indian Cancer Research Centre, Bombay, in 1957 and this unit was later shifted to National Institute of Nutrition (NIN), Hyderabad in 1976. it was renamed then as Laboratory Animal Information Service Centre (LAISC). In 1998, during the 7th Five Year Plan, additional support came from Department of Biotechnology (DBT) under the Ministry of Science and Technology, Government of India, which helped the unit to become the NCLAS. On 5 January 2016, the NCLAS is merged with NARF-BR and the former Unit becomes the NIN-animal facility. The scientists of NCLAS Developed obese and diabetic mutant rat models: WNIN/GR-Ob, WNIN/Ob, WNIN/Ob-IGT, to serve as pre-clinical animal models in drug development for chronic diseases like Obesity and Diabetes. Established a state of the art non-human primate facility with provision for experiments based on monkeys. NCLAS also came into the limelight due to the WNIN/Ob obese rat strain which is the heaviest inbred rat model available. It has been reported to reach up to 1.47 kg in body weight and shows various signs of increased DNA damage and significantly decreased lifespan.

== NIN and FSSAI ==
The Food Safety and Standards Authority of India (FSSAI) largely sources science-based knowledge and information for formulating the food regulations in the country. Many scientists of NIN are a part of various committee, panels and scientific groups that guide the FSSAI. The director is the co-chair of the three member panel that is looking into upcoming the front-of-pack labelling regulations. The FSSAI is responsible for protecting and promoting public health through the regulation and supervision of food safety. The FSSAI has been established under the Food Safety and Standards Act, 2006 which is a consolidating statute related to food safety and regulation in India.

== Education ==
NIN offers advanced education courses and MS-MD-PhD program(s) for nutrition, biochemistry, dietetics and laboratory animal sciences. The centre is recognised by Dr. N.T.R. University of Health Sciences and Kaloji Narayana Rao University of Health Sciences for pursuing post graduation in Applied Nutrition. Recently NIN has started awarding Research Fellowships to the toppers in the MSc course to pursue PhD in the institution. The institute is well recognised by Osmania University, University of Hyderabad, Jawaharlal Nehru Technological University, for pursuing PhD in various streams of Life Sciences especially Biochemistry and Nutrition. The institute has trained over 1600 health professionals from more than 35 countries. More than 150 candidates have successfully obtained PhD and MD degrees from NIN.

== Achievements ==
- Assessed dietary intake of individuals, house holds and nutritional profiles of different communities through periodic surveys of NNMB in 10 states.
- Suggested strategies to identify high risk pregnancies in rural areas of India. These were included in the National Reproductive and Child Health Program.
- Demonstrated TheraCyte Pancreatic Islet Transplantation technology in Primates and Rodents.
- Commercially delivered double fortified Salt – Tata Salt Plus, priced at an economical rate of ₹20 (21¢ US) per kg, is an iodine plus iron fortified salt, developed by double fortification technology. This technology was offered to Tata Chemicals under a long-term MoU after due studies on bio-availability across the population strata conducted and published by NIN.
- Exploded the protein myth and highlighted calorie gap as the major bottleneck for healthy growth of children.
- Developed simple and sensitive biochemical indicators for assessment of vitamin nutritive and pathogenic mechanisms of various nutritional deficiency syndromes.
- Established growth norms for Indian children.
- Emphasized the importance of growth monitoring for early diagnosis and appropriate management of protein energy malnutrition.
- Generated database on nutritive values of over 650 Indian foods, which is used by various national organisations, planners and academic research institutions
- Formulated Recommended Dietary Allowances (RDA) for Indians.
- Developed food based Dietary Guidelines for Indians.
- Developed National Nutrition Surveillance system (NSS-Triple A cycle of Assessment, Analysis and Action) to serve as an early warning system about nutrition problems.

== See also ==
- Genome Valley
- National Animal Resource Facility for Biomedical Research
- Central Drugs Standard Control Organization
