= National Institute for Research in Tuberculosis =

Indian research organization

- Established: 1956
- Research type: Public
- Budget: ₹90 crore (US$9.3 million)
- Field of research: Tuberculosis Research
- Director: Dr. Srinath Sathyanarayana
- Location: Chennai, India
- Campus: Urban, Chetpet
- Affiliations: University of Madras
- Operating agency: ICMR
- Website: nirt.res.in

The National Institute for Research in Tuberculosis (NIRT) is a tuberculosis research organization located in Chennai, Tamil Nadu. NIRT carries out research on clinical, bacteriological as well as behavioural and epidemiological aspects of tuberculosis and HIV-TB.

== Academics and Research ==
The NIRT (formerly known as the Tuberculosis Chemotherapy Centre) was set up in 1956 as a 5-year project, under the joint auspices of the Indian Council of Medical Research (ICMR), World Health Organization (WHO) and the British Medical Research Council (BMRC). The institute is recognized for post-graduate training leading to the Ph.D. degrees in bacteriology, biochemistry, immunology and statistics by the Madras University and by the Inter-University Board of India and Sri Lanka.
