= Indira Hinduja =

Indian gynecologist

- Born: 21 August 1946 (age 80); Shikarpur, British Sindh, British India
- Education: Bombay University
- Scientific career
- Fields: Infertility
- Workplaces: Inkus Infertility Clinic, KEM Hospital, Mumbai, Hinduja Hospital, Mumbai

Indira Hinduja (born 21 August 1946) is an Indian gynecologist, obstetrician and infertility specialist based in Mumbai. She pioneered the Gamete intrafallopian transfer (GIFT) technique resulting in the birth of India's first GIFT baby on 4 January 1988. Previously she delivered India's second test tube baby at KEM Hospital on 6 August 1986. She is also credited for developing an oocyte donation technique for menopausal and premature ovarian failure patients, giving the country's first baby out of this technique on 24 January 1991.

== Academic career ==
Dr. Hinduja's passion for medicine sparked when she was 9 years old. A broken bone had led her to the hospital, where she saw professionals in lab coats who appeared to have solutions. By the age of 32, she had completed her Doctorate in Medicine and was pursuing her phD in IVF research at the National Institute for Research in Reproductive Health.

She has obtained PhD degree for her thesis entitled 'Human in Vitro Fertilization and Embryo Transfer' from the Bombay University. She is a full-time practicing Obstetrician and Gynaecologist of the P.D. Hinduja Hospital, Mahim West, Bombay.

Hinduja is currently an honorary obstetrician and gynecologist at P.D. Hinduja National Hospital and Medical Research Centre in Mumbai.

Dr. Hinduja has 25 years of experience teaching students at Kind Edwards Memorial Hospital and Seth G.S. Medical Hospital and College.

== Awards ==
- Young Indian Award (1987)
- Outstanding Lady Citizen of Maharashtra State Jaycee Award (1987)
- Bharat Nirman Award for Talented Ladies (1994)
- International Women's Day Award by the Mayor of Bombay (1995; 2000)
- Lifetime Achievement Award by the Federation of Obstetrics and Gynaecological Society of India (1999)
- Dhanvantari Award by the Governor of Maharashtra (2000)
- Padma Shri award from the Government of India (2011)
