= National Institute of Malaria Research =

Indian research institute

- Abbreviation: NIMR
- Type: Professional Organisation
- Location: Sector 8, Dwarka, Delhi-110077
- Region served: India
- Director: Anup R. Anvikar
- Parent organisation: Indian Council of Medical Research
- Budget: ₹800 crore (US$83 million)
- Website: www.nimr.org.in

The National Institute of Malaria Research (NIMR), New Delhi, is one of the research institution of Indian Council of Medical Research under Department of Health Research, Ministry of Health & Family Welfare, Government of India, established in 1977 as Malaria Research Centre, which was renamed as National Institute of Malaria Research in November 2005.

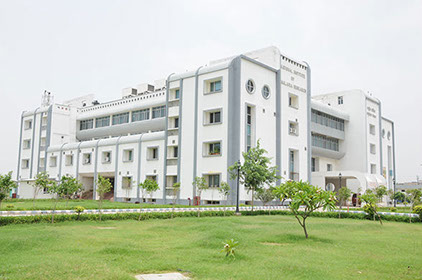
NIMR building

The primary task of the Institute is to find short term as well as long-term solutions to the problems of malaria through basic, applied and operational field research. The Institute also plays a key role in manpower resource development through trainings/workshops and transfer of technology. The major areas of research carried out over the years are on mosquito fauna surveys, development of genetic and molecular markers for important malaria vectors and parasites, cytotaxonomic studies identifying major vectors as species complexes and laboratory and field studies to examine the biological variations among sibling species, development of molecular identification techniques for sibling species, monitoring of insecticide resistance through space and time, preparation of action plans, etc. have yielded valuable information. Field evaluation of new insecticides, biolarvicides, insecticide-impregnated bed nets, drugs and parasite diagnostic kits have provided new armament to malaria control. Many of these have found place in national malaria control programme.

NIMR has a network of well developed laboratories at Delhi carrying out research on all aspects of malaria along with 10 field laboratories in malarious areas, which serve as testing ground for new technologies and help in the transfer of technologies.

== See also ==
- Desert Medicine Research Centre
