= National Institute of Translational Virology and AIDS Research =

Research institute in Pune, India

- Abbreviation: NITVAR
- Formation: 1992; 34 years ago
- Type: Public
- Legal status: Active
- Purpose: Medical research
- Headquarters: Pune, Maharashtra
- Location: 73-G, MIDC, Bhosari, Pune 411026, Post Box No. 1895
- Coordinates: 18.6237°N 73.8362°E
- Director: Sheela Godbole
- Administrative Officer: Swati Salunke
- Affiliations: Indian Council of Medical Research
- Budget: ₹1,050 crore (US$110 million)
- Website: www.nari-icmr.res.in

The National Institute of Translational Virology and AIDS Research (formerly National AIDS Research Institute NARI) is a research institute, run by Indian Council of Medical Research (ICMR), the apex body in India for the formulation, coordination and promotion of biomedical research. It was founded in 1992 with the purpose to provide leadership in biomedical research on HIV/AIDS in India. It is located in Bhosari, Pune, India. The current director of NARI is Dr Sheela Godbole.

== See also ==
- National AIDS Control Organisation
- HIV/AIDS in India
