= National Institute of Health Research, Dibrugarh =

One of six regional centres of Indian Council of Medical Research

ICMR–National Institute of Health Research, Dibrugarh
- Type: Education and Medical research
- Established: 1982 (44 years ago)
- Affiliations: Indian Council of Medical Research (ICMR)
- Director: Dr. Kanwar Narain
- Location: (India) Dibrugarh, Assam, India; 27.4727°N 94.9828°E
- Campus: Urban
- Acronym: ICMR-NIH, Dibrugarh
- Website: rmrcne.org.in
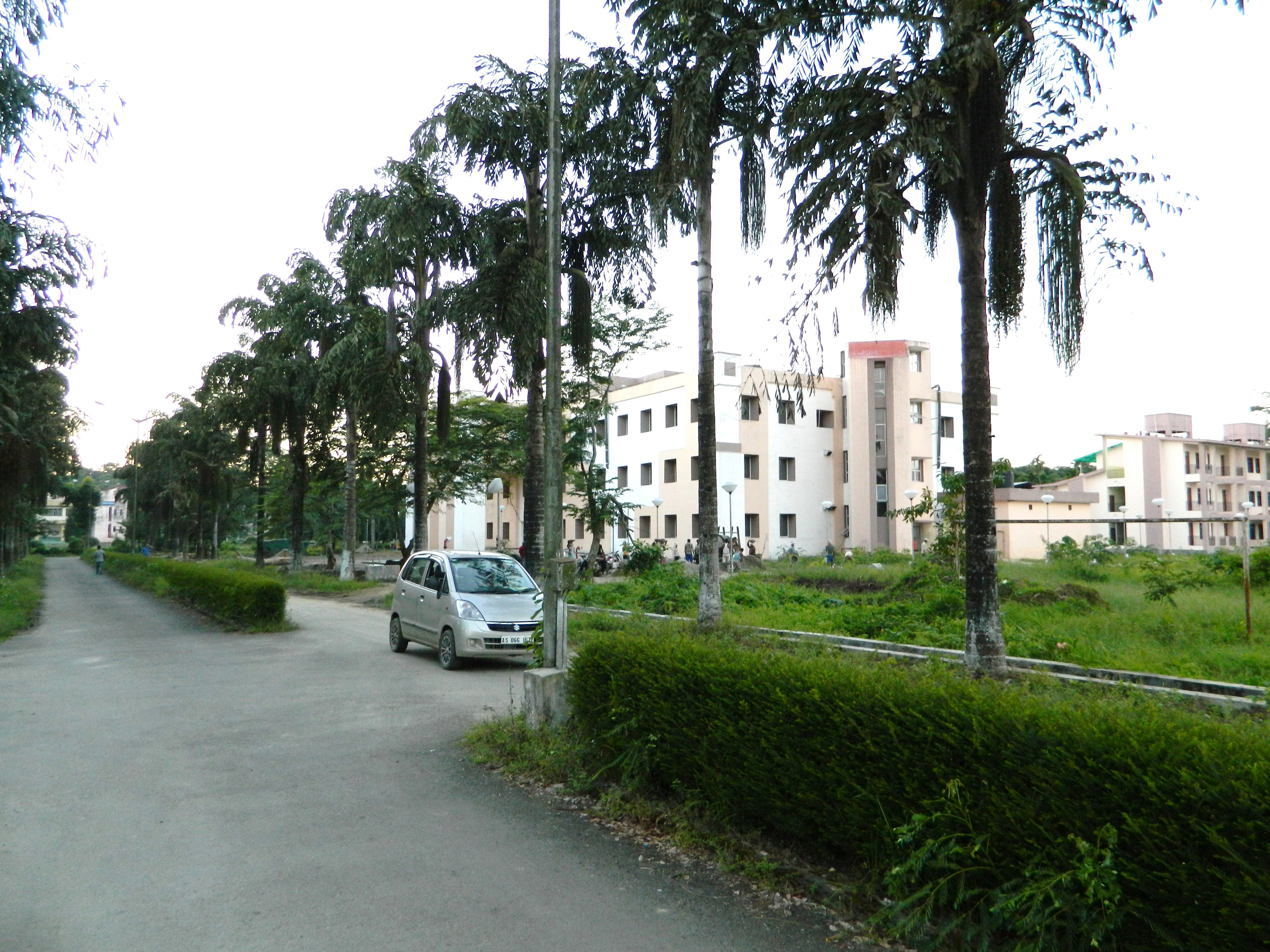

National Institute of Health Research, Dibrugarh (NIH, Dibrugarh, The International Centre of Excellence) is one of the six regional centres of Indian Council of Medical Research (ICMR) and is located in Dibrugarh city at Lahowal. It covers the most remote and less developed, eight states of the north-eastern region of India and is responsible for carrying out Biomedical Research in the region. It was established in 1982 and runs with intramural grant from ICMR and extramural ad hoc projects from different funding agencies.

This premier Medical Research institute has been recognized as an "International Centre of Excellence" by the National Institute of Health (NIH) and Washington University of USA.

The institute, in collaboration with Centre for Development of Advance Computing (CDAC), Pune, has been awarded the "MoSQuIT – mBillionth SAARC Countries Award 2013" recognized by The Grand Jury of The mBillionth Award South Asia as an Award Winner for the year 2013 for inventing disease surveillance system for malaria using mobile platform.

== Research projects ==
- Studies on bionomics of Anopheles dirus, the major vector of forest malaria in NE region of India.
- Epidemiological observations on malaria in some parts of Tengakhat PHC, Dibrugarh district, Assam
- Malariometric studies in some parts of Assam and Arunachal Pradesh
- Mosquito fauna of Northeast India with special reference to the medically important vectors.
- A study on prevalence and pattern of substance use in North-East India.
- Studies on prevalence of filariasis in some tea garden population of Assam
- Mosquito fauna of Dibrugarh district with special reference to Mansonia annulifera, a reported vector of Japanese encephalitis from the Dibrugarh district of Assam.
- Studies on paddy-field dermatitis (Panikaint) among workers in rice fields of upper Assam.
- Food-borne parasitic zoonosis: status of metacercarial infection in fishes of Assam.
- Study on Coronary Heart Disease and Hypertension (in Mizoram, Assam and Tea gardens of Upper Assam).
