= Rajiv Bahl =

Indian pediatrician and public health researcher

Dr. Rajiv Bahl
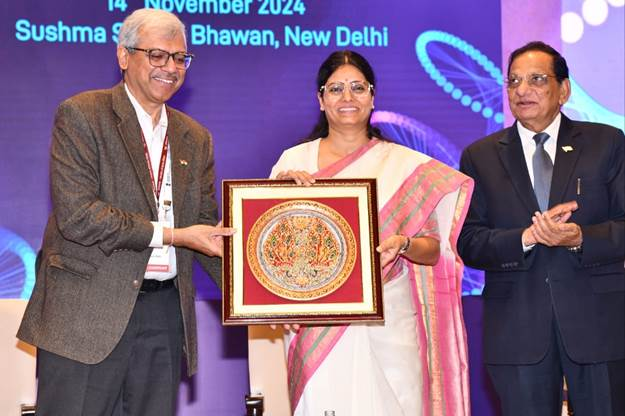
- Rajiv Bahl (1st from left) with Anupriya Patel and Vinod Kumar Paul at DHR-ICMR Heath Research Excellence Summit 2024
- Education: University College of Medical Sciences (MBBS); Lady Hardinge Medical College (MD); AIIMS New Delhi (PhD)
- Occupations: Director-general, Indian Council of Medical Research
- Employer: Government of India
- Website: https://www.icmr.gov.in/dg.html

Dr. Rajiv Bahl is an Indian paediatrician and public health researcher known for his research on maternal and child health research and health policy. He was the Head of Research on Maternal, Newborn, Child and Adolescent Health at the World Health Organization (WHO) from 2013 to 2022 and is currently the Director-General of the Indian Council of Medical Research.

== Early life and education ==
Rajiv Bahl received an MBBS from the University College of Medical Sciences, postgraduate in pediatrics from Lady Hardinge Medical College and a PhD in public health from AIIMS New Delhi.
