= Indian Council of Medical Research =

Government organization

- Abbreviation: ICMR
- Predecessor: Indian Research Fund Association (IRFA)
- Formation: 1911; 115 years ago (as IRFA)
- Type: Government Organisation
- Legal status: Active
- Headquarters: New Delhi, India
- Key people: Rajiv Bahl, Director General, Indian Council of Medical Research (Secretary, GoI – Department of Health Research)
- Parent organization: Ministry of Health and Family Welfare, Government of India
- Budget: ₹4,200 crore (US$440 million) (2026–27)
- Website: www.icmr.gov.in

The Indian Council of Medical Research (ICMR), the apex body in India for the formulation, coordination and promotion of biomedical research, is one of the oldest and largest medical research bodies in the world.

The ICMR is funded by the Government of India through the Department of Health Research, Ministry of Health and Family Welfare. In 2007, the organization established the Clinical Trials Registry - India, which is India's national registry for clinical trials.

ICMR's 26 national institutes conduct research on specific health topics like tuberculosis, leprosy, cholera and diarrhoeal diseases, viral diseases including AIDS, malaria, kala-azar, vector control, nutrition, food & drug toxicology, reproduction, immuno-haematology, oncology, medical statistics, etc. Its 6 regional medical research centres focus on regional health problems, and also aim to strengthen or generate research capabilities in different geographic areas of the country.

The council's research priorities coincide with national health priorities such as control and management of communicable diseases, fertility control, maternal and child health, control of nutritional disorders, developing alternative strategies for health care delivery, containment within safety limits of environmental and occupational health problems; research on major non-communicable diseases like cancer, cardiovascular diseases, blindness, diabetes and other metabolic and haematological disorders; mental health research and drug research (including traditional remedies). These efforts are undertaken with a view to reduce the total burden of disease and to promote health and well-being of the population.

== History ==
In 1911, the then British Government of India set up the Indian Research Fund Association (IRFA) with the specific objective of sponsoring and coordinating medical research in the country. It was established by Sir Harcourt Butler on November 15 that year. After independence, several important changes were made in the organisation and the activities of IRFA. It was redesignated as the Indian Council of Medical Research (ICMR) in 1949, with a considerably expanded scope of functions.

== Governing body ==
The governing body of the council is presided over by the Union Health Minister. It is assisted in scientific and technical matters by a scientific advisory board comprising eminent experts in different biomedical disciplines. The board, in its turn, is assisted by a series of scientific advisory groups, scientific advisory committees, expert groups, task forces, steering committees etc. which evaluate and monitor different research activities of the council.

The council promotes biomedical research in the country through intramural as well as extramural research. Over the decades, the base of extramural research and also its strategies have been expanded by the council.

Intramural research is carried out currently through the council's 30 permanent research institutes/centres which are mission-oriented national institutes located in different parts of India. The institutes pursue specific areas of research such as COVID-19, tuberculosis, leprosy, cholera and diarrhoeal diseases, viral diseases including Rotavirus, dengue, COVID-19, Ebolavirus, Influenza, Japanese encephalitis, AIDS, malaria, kala-azar, vector control, nutrition, food & drug toxicology, reproduction, immunohaematology, oncology, and medical statistics. Six Regional Medical Research Centres address regional health problems, and also aim to strengthen or generate research capabilities in different geographic areas of the country. It has also been involved in research related to rare diseases like Handigodu syndrome.

== Activities ==
Extramural research is promoted by ICMR by establishing Centres for Advanced Research in different research areas around existing expertise and infrastructure in selected departments of medical colleges, universities and other non-ICMR research institutes. The ICMR also funds task force studies which emphasise a time-bound, goal-oriented approach with clearly defined targets, specific time frames, standardised and uniform methodologies, and often a multicentric structure. Open-ended research is conducted on the basis of applications for grants-in-aid received from scientists in non-ICMR Research Institutes, Medical colleges and Universities located in different parts of the country. Collaborative research projects with other institutes such as that between Institute of Pathology, Delhi and NCRM are also undertaken.

ICMR's Viral Research and Diagnostic Laboratories (VRDL) for diagnosis of the viral and other infectious diseases is gradually evolving and is proposed to be the largest network of laboratories for timely identification of viruses and other agents causing morbidity significant at public health level and specific agents causing epidemics and/or potential agents for bioterrorism and undertake research for identification of emerging and newer genetically active/ modified agents. In addition to research activities, ICMR also provides international fellowship programme for research and training and exposure of Indian biomedical scientists in various countries as well as offering opportunities to scientists from developing countries to come and work in Indian institutes/laboratories. It is also the secretariat for Health Ministry's Screening Committee (HMSC) meeting organised monthly for consideration of international collaborative research projects. It also encourages human resource development in biomedical research through Research Fellowships, Short-Term Visiting Fellowships, Short-Term Research Studentships, and various training programmes and workshops conducted by ICMR institutes and headquarters.

For retired medical scientists and teachers, the council offers the position of emeritus scientist to enable them to continue or take up research on specific biomedical topics. The council also awards prizes to Indian scientists, in recognition of significant contributions to biomedical research as well as those who work in the underdeveloped parts of the country. At present, the council offers 38 awards, of which 11 are meant exclusively for young scientists (below 40 years). ICMR has supported research into bacteriophage therapy as a promising alternative to antibiotics for managing drug-resistant bacterial infections. Its activities include the isolation, characterization, and formulation of therapeutic phages, evaluation of their efficacy against multidrug-resistant pathogens, and investigation of phage–antibiotic synergy. ICMR has also provided funding to leading research institutes such as the Postgraduate Institute of Medical Education and Research (PGIMER), Chandigarh, and the All India Institute of Medical Sciences (AIIMS), New Delhi, to advance preclinical and clinical studies on phage therapy.(ref. https://www.the-microbiologist.com/features/antimicrobial-resistance-and-phage-therapy-in-india/1386.article)

The Indian Journal of Medical Research is published under the auspices of the council.

== List of ICMR research facilities in India ==
- National Institute of Nutrition (NIN), Hyderabad
- National Animal Resource Facility for Biomedical Research (NARF-BR), Hyderabad
- National Institute for Research in Tuberculosis (NIRT), Chennai
- National Institute of Epidemiology, Chennai
- National Institute of Cancer Prevention and Research (NICPR), Noida
- National Institute of Malaria Research (NIMR), Delhi
- Rajendra Memorial Research Institute of Medical Sciences (RMRIMS), Patna
- National Institute for Research in Reproductive Health (NIRRH), Mumbai
- National Institute of Virology (NIV), Pune
- National Institute of Traditional Medicine (NITM), Belagavi
- Microbial Containment Complex (MCC), Pune
- National Institute of Translational Virology and AIDS Research (NITVAR), Pune
- National Institute of Occupational Health (NIOH), Ahmedabad
- National Institute of Child Health & Development Research (NICH&DR), Delhi
- National Institute for Research in Digital Health and Data Science (NIRDH&DS), Delhi
- Vector Control Research Centre (VCRC), Puducherry
- National Institute for Research in Bacterial Infections (NIRBI), Kolkata
- ICMR Virus Unit (IVU), Kolkata
- Institute of Reproductive Medicine (IRM), Kolkata
- National Institute for Research in Tribal Health (NIRTH), Jabalpur
- National Centre for Disease Informatics and Research (NCDIR), Bengaluru
- Bhopal Memorial Hospital and Research Centre (BMHRC), Bhopal
- National Institute for Research in Environmental Health (NIREH), Bhopal
- National JALMA Institute for Leprosy & Other Mycobacterial Diseases (NJILOMD), Agra
- Centre for Research in Medical Entomology (CRME), Madurai
- National Institute of Immunohaemotology (NIIH), Mumbai
- Enterovirus Research Centre (ERC), Mumbai
- Genetic Research Centre (GRC), Mumbai
- National Institute of Health Research, Jodhpur
- Regional Medical Research Centre (RMRC), Port Blair
- Regional Medical Research Centre (RMRC), Gorakhpur
- National Institute of Health Research, Bhubaneswar
- National Institute of Health Research, Dibrugarh, Assam
