= National Institute of Epidemiology =

Medical research organization in Tamil Nadu, India

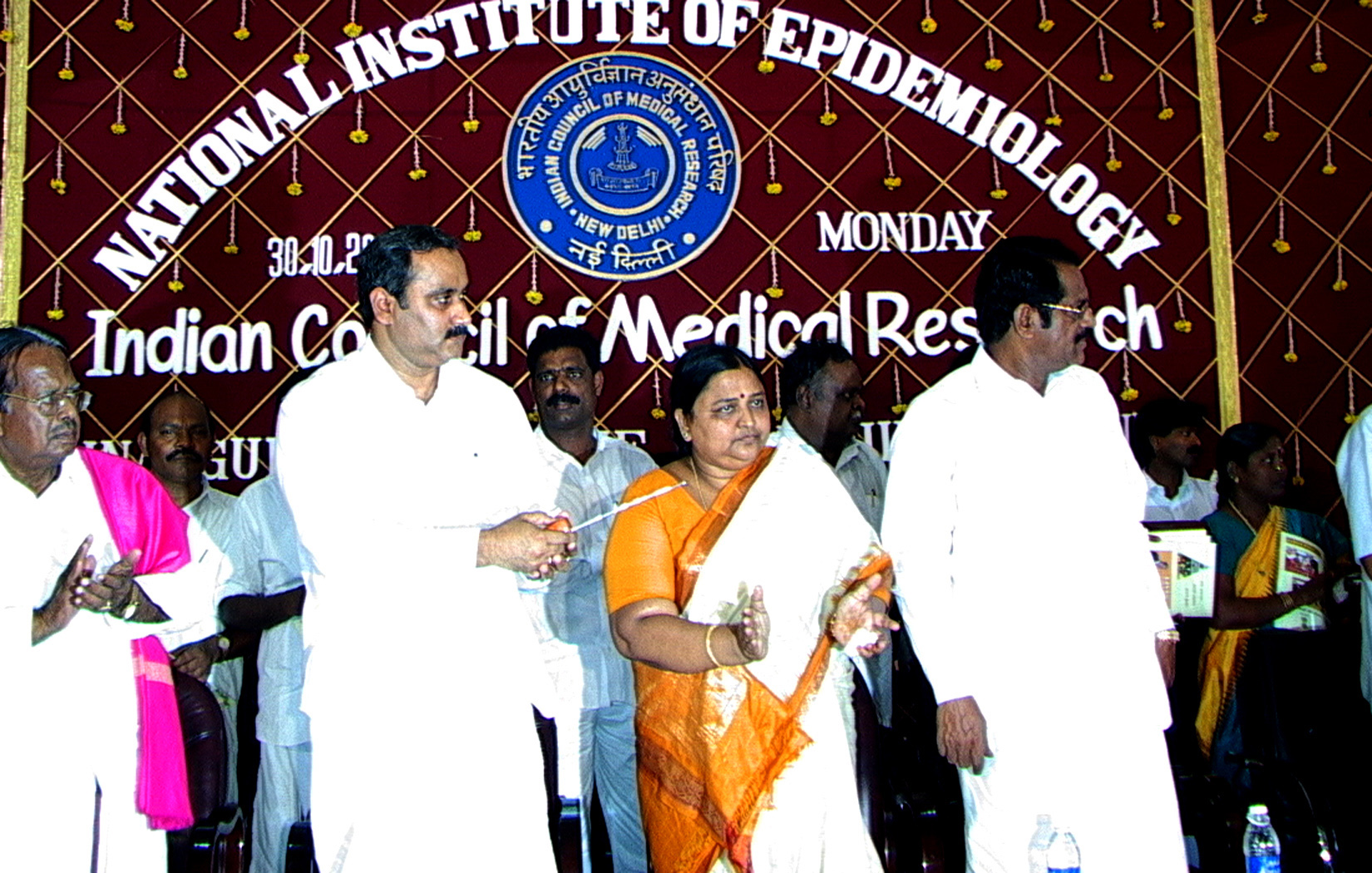
- Established: 1999
- Research type: Public
- Budget: ₹500 crore (US$53 million)
- Field of research: Epidemiology; Public Health
- Director: Dr. Manoj V. Murhekar
- Location: Chennai, India
- Campus: Urban, Ayappakkam
- Affiliations: SCTIMST, University of Madras
- Operating agency: ICMR
- Website: nie.gov.in

The National Institute of Epidemiology (NIE) is a medical research organisation located in Chennai, Tamil Nadu. NIE conducts research including interventional studies, disease modelling and health systems, conducts epidemiological investigations and clinical trials of traditional remedies.

== Academics ==
NIE has been conducting MPH (Epidemiology and Health Systems) programme of the Sree Chitra Thirunal Institute of Medical Sciences and Technology and M.Sc Biostatistics programme affiliated to Periyar university The Institute is also recognised by the University of Madras for research leading to Ph.D. degrees in the areas of epidemiology and bio-statistics.
