= Pradhan Mantri Digital Health Mission =

Indian digital health mission

Pradhan Mantri Digital Health Mission (PMDHM) is a health initiative of the Government of India that will provide a complete digital health record and ID for individuals. It will be launched by Prime Minister Narendra Modi on 27 September 2021. Andaman & Nicobar, Chandigarh, Dadra and Nagar Haveli and Daman and Diu, Ladakh, Lakshadweep, and Puducherry have already piloted the scheme.
