= National Institute for Research in Reproductive Health =

Indian research institute

National Institute for Research in Reproductive and Child Health
- Former names: IRR, ICRC, CTU, RPU, NIRRH
- Type: Public
- Established: 1970; 56 years ago
- Parent institution: Indian Council of Medical Research
- Academic affiliations: University of Mumbai
- Budget: ₹350 crore (US$36 million)
- Director: Dr. Geetanjali Sachdeva
- Academic staff: 42
- Location: Jehangir Merwanji Street, Parel, Mumbai, Maharashtra, 400012, India
- Campus: Urban
- Language: English
- Website: http://www.nirrh.res.in/

The National Institute For Research in Reproductive and Child Health (NIRRCH) is a research institute of the Indian Council of Medical Research (ICMR). It was previously known as the Institute of Research in Reproduction. It was established in 1970, by the joining two ICMR units, the Reproductive Physiology Unit and the Contraceptive Testing Unit.

It is affiliated to the University of Mumbai for M.Sc. and Ph.D. programmes in Biochemistry, Applied Biology and Life Sciences.
