= National Institute of Health Research, Jodhpur =

Indian research institute

- ICMR-NIHR Jodhpur
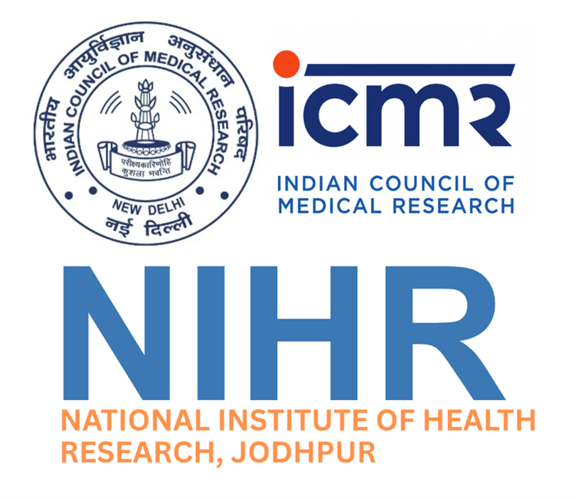
- ICMR NIHR Jodhpur
- Abbreviation: NIHR
- Established: 1984; 42 years ago
- Type: Public
- Legal status: Active
- Purpose: Medical research
- Headquarters: Jodhpur, Rajasthan, India
- Location: ICMR-NIHR(DMRC), Opposite Krishna Nagar, New Pali Road, Jodhpur– 342005, Rajasthan India
- Coordinates: 26.233705°N 73.026960°E
- Director: Prof.(Dr.) Pankaj Bhardwaj
- Affiliations: Indian Council of Medical Research
- Staff: Scientists, Technical, Administrative & Support Staff
- Website: niirncd.icmr.org.in

National Institute of Health Research, Jodhpur (NIHR), Jodhpur is an institute under the Indian Council of Medical Research (ICMR), dedicated to conducting research on non-communicable diseases (NCDs). The institute is located in Jodhpur, Rajasthan, India.

== History ==
The National Institute for Health Research (NIHR), located in Jodhpur, was originally established on 27 June 1984 as the Desert Medicine Research Centre (DMRC). It was later renamed the National Institute for Implementation Research on Non-Communicable Diseases (NIIRNCD) on 7 December 2019, and redesignated as NIHR on 29 April 2026.

The Institute houses state-of-the-art facilities for conducting basic laboratory-based research in microbiology, biochemistry, and vector biology. It is also actively strengthening its capacity and workforce to advance implementation research in non-communicable diseases (NCDs).

Currently, NIHR comprises a team of dedicated scientists and technical experts, supported by administrative and operational staff. The Institute’s key focus areas include cardiovascular diseases, chronic respiratory diseases, environmental health, nutritional disorders, cancers, injury and trauma, mental health conditions, including substance use disorders, genetic disorders, and other NCDs of public health significance in India.

NIHR aims to generate high-impact implementation research across these domains, build capacity through specialized training programmes, and develop effective behaviour change communication strategies to address NCD risk factors. The Institute welcomes collaboration with academic and research institutions, as well as individual researchers committed to advancing public health in alignment with national health priorities.

== Overview ==
The institute has state-of-the-art facilities to conduct basic laboratory-based research in its microbiology, biochemistry, and vector biology laboratories. It is expanding its manpower and infrastructure to strengthen its capacity in conducting Implementation research related to NCDs.

At present, the institute has a team comprising scientists, technical experts, and administrative and support staff.

== Vision ==
To be the leader in conducting implementation research for prevention and control of non-communicable diseases.

== Mission ==
To equip all health care workers in the country with the necessary skills and competencies so that they can contribute to the prevention, control, and treatment of diseases & providing a support to national health Programme.

== Goal ==
To reduce the burden of diseases and improve the quality of life of people.

== Objectives ==
- To conduct implementation research in non-communicable diseases of public health significance.
- To develop human resources and build capacities for strengthening implementation research capabilities in other institutions.
- To develop information, education, and communication (IEC) strategies and tools for prevention, control, and treatment of NCDs.
- To provide recommendations to policy makers and planners in framing policies for prevention, control, and treatment of NCDs.
- To collaborate with other institutions, agencies, and individuals for developing innovative solutions for NCDs’ prevention, control, and treatment.
- To create an interface between communicable diseases and non-communicable diseases.

== Research Focus ==
The institute’s thrust areas of research include:

- Cardiovascular disease
- Chronic respiratory disease
- Environmental health
- Nutritional Deficiencys
- Cancers
- Injury & Trauma
- Mental health and substance abuse
- Genetic disorders
- Other non-communicable diseases of public health significance in India.

== Research Laboratories ==
The research laboratories at NIHR include:

- Bio Technology Laboratory (Erstwhile Vector Biology Lab)
- Microbiology Laboratory
- Bio-Chemistry Laboratory
- Virology Laboratory
- Epidemiology Laboratory

== Collaborations and Capacity Building ==
NIIRNCD aspires to:

- Carry out implementation research in its thrust areas.
- Provide training for capacity building in implementation research to other academic and research institutions.
- Develop behavior change communication materials and models for tackling risk factors of various NCDs.
- Foster collaborations with national & international institutions and individuals interested in augmenting research on non-communicable diseases.
