= Regional Cancer Centre (disambiguation) =

Regional Cancer Centre may mean:

- Regional Cancer Centre, India
  - Regional Cancer Centre, Allahabad
  - Regional Cancer Centre, JIPMER, Pondicherry
  - Regional Cancer Center, Raipur
  - Regional Cancer Centre, Shimla
  - Regional Cancer Centre, Thiruvananthapuram
  - RST Regional Cancer Centre, Nagpur.
