= All India Institute of Medical Sciences, Madurai =

Indian public hospital and medical school

- Type: Public Medical School
- Established: 2021; 5 years ago
- President: Dr. Prashant Lavania
- Director: Dr. Vir Singh Negi (additional charge)
- Students: 50 (per year)
- Location: Madurai, Tamil Nadu, India; 9.887054°N 77.999495°E
- Campus: Semi Urban 222 acres (90 ha)
- Language: Tamil and English
- Website: aiimsmadurai.edu.in

All India Institute of Medical Sciences, Madurai (AIIMS Madurai) is an AIIMS public medical university of higher education Under PMSSY Division, Ministry of Health and Family Welfare, Government of India that is located at Thoppur near Madurai, Tamil Nadu, India, Currently operating in the temporary campus at GRMC, Ramnathapuram, Tamilnadu. The All India Institute of Medical Sciences (AIIMS) is a distinguished group of autonomous public medical institutions established to elevate health and wellness standards across India. Recognized as "Institutes of National Importance" by an Act of Parliament in 1956, AIIMS institutions are dedicated to advancing medical care, research, and education.

The yearly MBBS intake is 50 and selection is done through NEET(UG).

== History ==
The AIIMS was officially announced on 28 February 2015, in the budget speech for 2015–16, where the Minister of Finance Arun Jaitley announced five more AIIMS, in Jammu & Kashmir, Himachal Pradesh, Punjab, Assam and Tamil Nadu and an "AIIMS-like" institute in Bihar. Tamil Nadu had proposed five sites to set up an AIIMS. Besides Thoppur, Sengipatti (Thanjavur), Pudukottai town, Chengalpattu (Kanchipuram) and Perundurai (Erode) were considered. In 2018, the union cabinet gave an official approval for the location, on a 222-acre lot in the Thoppur, near Madurai.

By January 2019, the boundary wall of AIIMS Madurai campus was completed. Prime Minister Narendra Modi had laid the foundation stone of AIIMS Madurai in January 2019. The state government handed over the land to the Government of India in February 2020. In March 2021, the funding agency, Japan International Cooperation Agency (JICA), extended assistance. The All India Institute of Medical Sciences, Madurai, was officially established on July 3, 2020, through a Government of India gazette notification. The loan agreement was signed in February 2022. The Japan International Cooperation Agency (JICA) informed Minister for Health and Family Welfare of Tamil Nadu Ma. Subramanian in February 2023 that the construction of AIIMS Madurai would begin by the end of 2024 and be completed by 2028.

== Healthcare ==
=== Medical facilities ===
The AIIMS Madurai will have 15-20 super specialty departments.

=== Hospital ===
The hospital will have around 750 beds. As per the current operational AIIMS data, it is expected that the hospital will cater to around 1500 OPD patients per day and around 1000 IPD patients per month.

== Academics ==
=== Admission ===
Like all other AIIMS the institute select students for MBBS course through NEET(UG) annually.

=== Medical College ===
Currently being operated at the temporary campus, GRMC, Ramnathapuram, Tamilnadu. The college started with 50 students in April 2022, from the academic session 2021–2022. The institution presently accommodates three batches of students and is poised to welcome its fourth batch, reflecting its expanding educational capacity.
