= Alka Kriplani =

Indian gynecologist

- Born: Raipur, Chhattisgarh, India
- Occupation: Gynecologist
- Awards: Padma Shri; Dr. B. C. Roy Award; Rashtriya Gaurav Award; DMA Medical Teacher’s Award; C. L. Jhaveri Award; K. P. Tamaskar Award; Dr. Neera Agarwal Gold Medal; Jagadishwari Mishra Award; Bayer Schering APCOC Award; Dr. Nimish Shelat Research Prize; DGF Women of the Year Award; IMAAMS Distinguished Service Award

Alka Kriplani is an Indian gynecologist, medical writer and academic, known for her contributions to the fields of Reproductive Endocrinology and Gynaecological Endoscopy. She was professor and the Head of the Department of Gynecology and Obstetrics at the All India Institute of Medical Sciences, New Delhi. A recipient of the Dr. B. C. Roy Award in 2007, she was honoured by the Government of India in 2015 with Padma Shri, the fourth highest Indian civilian award.

== Biography ==
Alka Kriplani graduated in Medicine (MBBS) and secured a master's degree in gynecology and obstetrics (MD) from Pt. Jawahar Lal Nehru Memorial Medical College, Raipur, in the Indian state of Chhattisgarh. Later, she joined the All India Institute of Medical Sciences, New Delhi and is a professor and the head of the gynecology and obstetrics department there. She is an honorary Fellow of Royal College of Obstetricians and Gynaecologists (FRCOG) of London and holds the fellowships of Academy of Medicine, Singapore (FAMS), Indian College of Obstetricians and Gynaecologists (FICOG), Indian College of Maternal and Child Health (FICMCH) and the Federation of Immunological Societies of Asia-Oceania (FIMSA).

Dr. Kriplani is the president of the Gynaecological Endocrine Society of India (GESI) since 2011, a former president of Association of Obstetricians and Gynaecologists of Delhi (AOGD) and a former vice president of the Federation of Obstetricians and Gynaecological Societies of India and the Delhi Gynaecological Endoscopists Society. She has served AOGD in various capacities in the past and is a former member of the governing council of the Indian College of Obstetricians and Gynecologists, a subsidiary of FOGSI. She has also been a member of the editorial board of the Asian Journal of Obstetrics and Gynecology.

Kriplani is reported to have been involved in research and clinical trials in the field of gynecology and her findings have been recorded by way of several papers published in peer reviewed national and international journals. She is the author of 691 publications composed of 2 books, 269 medical papers, 271 abstracts and has contributed 53 chapters in books published by other authors. She has delivered over 500 guest lectures in India and abroad, conducted 79 live workshops and holds regular endoscopy training programs at AIIMS.

Kriplani, an elected fellow of the National Academy of Medical Sciences, is a recipient of several awards and honours such as C. L. Jhaveri (1995), Dr. Neera Agarwal Gold Medal (1999), K. P. Tamaskar award (2002), DMA Medical Teachers Award (2005), Jagadishwari Mishra Award (2006), Rashtriya Gaurav Award (2007), IMAAMS Distinguished Service Award (2007), Bayer Schering APCOC Talents Encouragement Award (2008), Dr. Nimish Shelat Research Prize in Reproductive Endocrinology (2010) and DGF Women of the Year Award (2010). The Government of India awarded her Dr. B. C. Roy Award, the highest Indian medical award, in 2007 and followed it up with the civilian award of Padma Shri in 2015.

== See also ==
- Endocrinology
- Endoscopy
