= Gurjeet Singh Toot =

Indian circle kabaddi player (1980/1981–2026)

Personal information
- Born: 1980 or 1981 Toot, Ferozepur district, Punjab, India
- Died: 11 August 2026 (aged 45) Faridkot, Punjab, India

Sport
- Country: India
- Sport: Kabaddi
- Position: Raider
- Team: India

Gurjeet Singh Toot (1980 or 1981 – 11 August 2026) was an Indian international circle kabaddi player who played as a raider. He competed in tournaments in England and Canada, winning the "Best Raider" award in England in 2005 and at the Canada Cup in 2007.

== Early life ==
Gurjeet Singh was born in Toot village in the Ferozepur district of Punjab. His father, Gurmail Singh, worked as a farmer, and his mother, Jaswinder Kaur, was a homemaker. He completed his secondary education up to Class 12.

Singh initially trained in basketball before switching to kabaddi in 1995 under coach Amarinder Singh Ruby. He made his competitive debut in a local 62 kg category match in his village.

== Career ==
In 2004, Singh began playing in the domestic circle kabaddi circuit in England, where he was named "Best Raider" the following year. During a subsequent tournament in Canada, he sustained a hip injury while competing, but returned in 2007 to win the "Best Raider" award at the Canada Cup tournament in Toronto.

According to his coach, Singh won several tournament prizes during his playing career, including five Royal Enfield motorcycles and a horse, and once won three separate kabaddi tournaments in a single day. Commentators and spectators frequently nicknamed him the "Burj Khalifa of Kabaddi" due to his physical stature.

== Personal life and death ==
Singh was married to Gursharan Kaur, with whom he had a daughter.

Following multiple sports injuries, Singh began using drugs around 2012, which developed into an addiction and later resulted in chronic kidney disease. He received medical treatment at AIIMS Bathinda and PGIMER Chandigarh. He was later admitted to Guru Gobind Singh Government Medical College in Faridkot, where he died on 11 August 2026, at the age of 45.

== In popular culture ==
Singh was referenced in Punjabi songs by singers Angrej Ali and Arjan Dhillon (in the track "Ilzaam").
