= Jasvinder K Gambhir =

Indian doctor, researcher and professor

- Education: Punjab University; Post Graduate Institute of Medical Education and Research
- Known for: Work on Homocysteine metabolism and Ayurvedic Anti-Diabetics
- Scientific career
- Fields: Clinical Biochemistry, Diabetes, Cardiology
- Workplaces: School of Medical Sciences and Research, Greater Noida

Jasvinder K Gambhir is an Indian doctor, researcher and professor in the fields of clinical biochemistry, diabetology and cardiology. Dr Gambhir completed her master's in biochemistry in 1972 from Punjab University and PhD from Post Graduate Institute of Medical Education and Research (PGIMER, Chandigarh). She has an experience in the field of over 40 years. She is Senior professor and Head of Department, Biochemistry at University College of Medical Sciences, New Delhi and Senior Professor at School of Medical Sciences and Research Noida. Dr. Gambhir is also a member of American Association of Clinical Chemistry.

Dr. Gambhir's work manifested the Anti Diabetic properties of Withania (Rishyagandha) a traditional Indian herb. Her work has been cited over 1000 times on Google Scholar. She has published over 50 research papers and case studies in a number of international journals, most notably, World Journal of Diabetes, United States National Library of Medicine, International Journal of Lipid Research, Indian Heart Journal, Clinica Chimica Acta, J Assoc Physicians and Hemodialysis International. Her works spans across numerous fields such as nephropathy, estrogen deficiency effects, lipoproteins, homocysteine and polymorphism.
