= Khuda Jassu =

Coordinates: 30.775°N 76.771°E

Khuda Jassu is a village in the Chandigarh district, in the Union Territory of Chandigarh, India. It is located on Chandigarh Mullanpur road and is at a distance of 1 kilometre (0.62 mi) from PGIMER Chandigarh. It has an area of 482 acres (195 ha) and has a population of 1438 as per the 2001 census.
