= All India Institutes of Medical Sciences =

Autonomous Indian public medical institute group

All Indian Institutes of Medical Sciences
- Other name: AIIMS
- Type: Public Medical University
- Established: 8 February 1956 (70 years ago)
- Parent institution: Ministry of Health and Family Welfare, Government of India
- Budget: ₹14,802.92 crore (US$1.6 billion) (FY2026 est.)
- Location: 26 cities in India
- Language: English

Location of various AIIMS:
Functioning Under construction Proposed

The All India Institutes of Medical Sciences (AIIMS) is a group of autonomous government public medical universities of higher education under the jurisdiction of Ministry of Health and Family Welfare, Government of India. These institutes have been declared by an Act of Parliament as Institutes of National Importance. AIIMS Delhi, the forerunner institute, was established in 1956. AIIMS is considered to be the premier health institution of India.

Since 1956, 24 more institutes were announced. As of November 2026, twenty one institutes are operating and 2 more are expected to become operational in upcoming years. Under premiership of Narendra Modi 20 AIIMS were announced and of which 13 have been operational.

== History ==
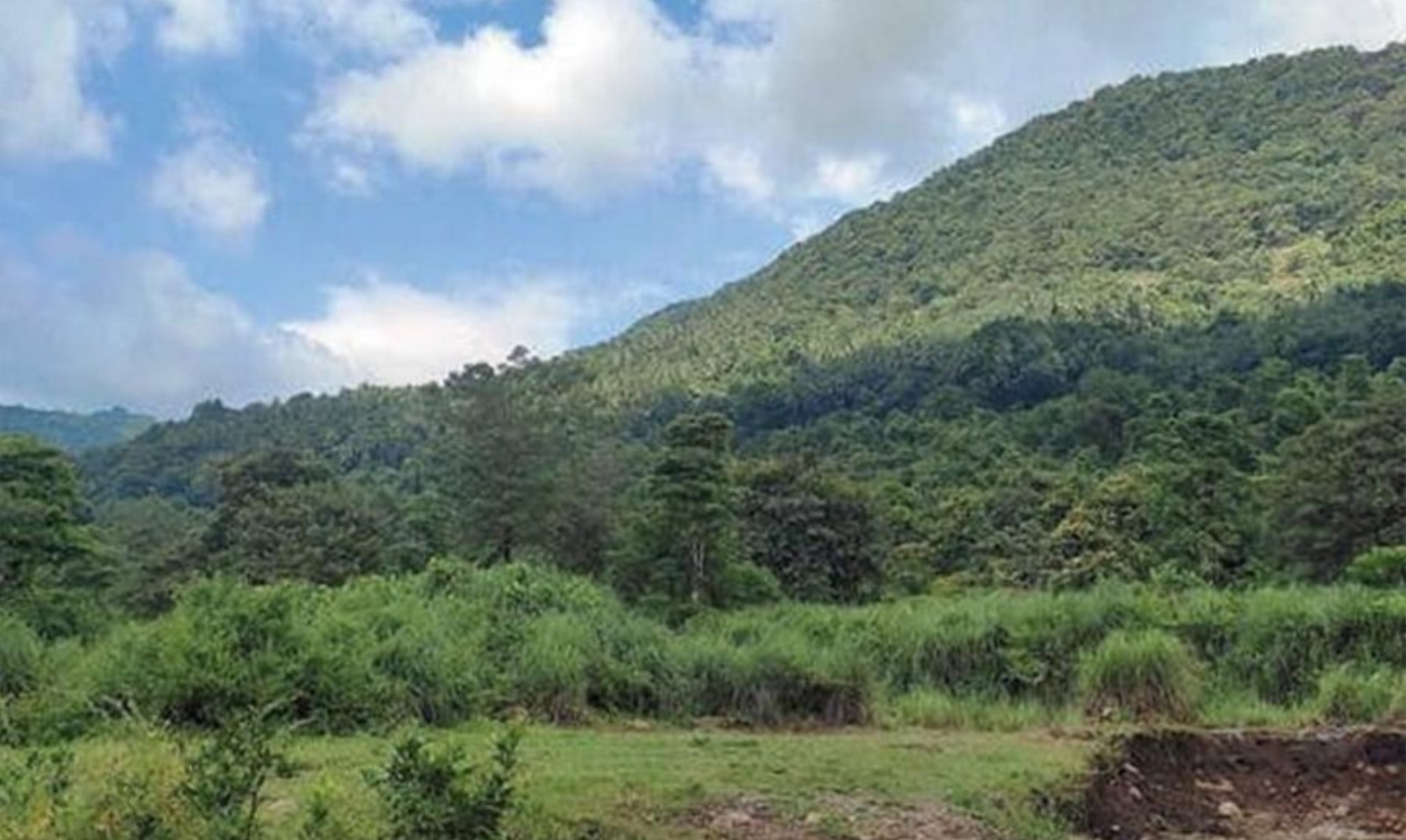
Keralam Government have proposed over 10 sites including Thiruvananthapuram, Kottayam, Ernakulam, Thrissur, Kozhikkode, Kasargod for the Setting up of AIIMS in Keralam

The foundation stone of the All India Institute of Medical Sciences (AIIMS) in Delhi was laid in 1952, during the tenure of Rajkumari Amrit Kaur as India’s Health Minister; later, on February 18, 1956, introduced a new bill in the Lok Sabha (House of the People). The first AIIMS was established in 1956 under the All India Institute of Medical Sciences Act, 1956. Originally proposed to be established in Calcutta, it was established in Delhi following the refusal of Chief Minister of West Bengal Bidhan Chandra Roy. The act established AIIMS Delhi, which was then known simply as All India Institute of Medical Sciences, and gave it the Institutes of National Importance (INI) status.

In 2003, the government of India announced the Pradhan Mantri Swasthya Suraksha Yojana initiative which aimed at "correcting regional imbalances in the availability of affordable/reliable tertiary healthcare services". This was to be done through two main channels: setting up AIIMS-like institutions and upgrading government medical colleges. Though the announcement and initiative was made in 2003 during Atal Bihari Vajpayee's tenure, the project was delayed owing to the power shift at the center. PMSSY was officially launched in March 2006 but six AIIMS-like medical institutes were announced in tenure of Vajpayee government only, before UPA government. The six institutes become operational through an Ordinance from September 2012. The All India Institute of Medical Sciences (Amendment) Bill, 2012 was introduced in the Lok Sabha on 27 August 2012 in order to replace that Ordinance. Lok Sabha passed the Bill on 30 August 2012, it was introduced in Rajya Sabha on 3 September 2012 and passed on 4 September 2012. The Act was published on 13 September 2012.

The act also allowed the institutes to operate more autonomously, and awarded them the INI status. It also conferred the power to establish other AIIMS-like institutes by gazette notification and give them equal status.

=== Phase I ===
PMSSY was officially launched in March 2006 and six AIIMS-like medical institutes were announced for under-served states in Patna, Raipur, Bhubaneswar, Bhopal, Jodhpur and Rishikesh. These were originally assigned ₹332 crore (equivalent to ₹12 billion or US$120 million in 2026) per institution, a sum which was raised to ₹820 crore (equivalent to ₹20 billion or US$210 million in 2026) in 2010. They were later retroactively denoted "Phase I institutes".

=== Phase II ===
In 2013 a further gazette notification was made under the same Act, establishing AIIMS Raebareli. It was later denoted as "Phase-II" of PMSSY.

=== Phase III ===
Six medical college hospitals in Uttar Pradesh will be modernized and converted into super-specialty facility on the lines of All India Institute of Medical Sciences (AIIMS), Uttar Pradesh, has influenced the decision to add two more colleges to the already cleared list of medical colleges that will be upgraded under Phase 3 of Pradhan Mantri Swasthya Suraksha Yojana (PMSSY). The four already under the third phase of the program are the ones at Gorakhpur, Allahabad, Meerut and Jhansi. Apart from this, Sarojini Naidu Medical College, Agra and Ganesh Shankar Vidyarthi Memorial (GSVM) Medical College, Kanpur also join the PMSSY list.

=== Phase IV ===
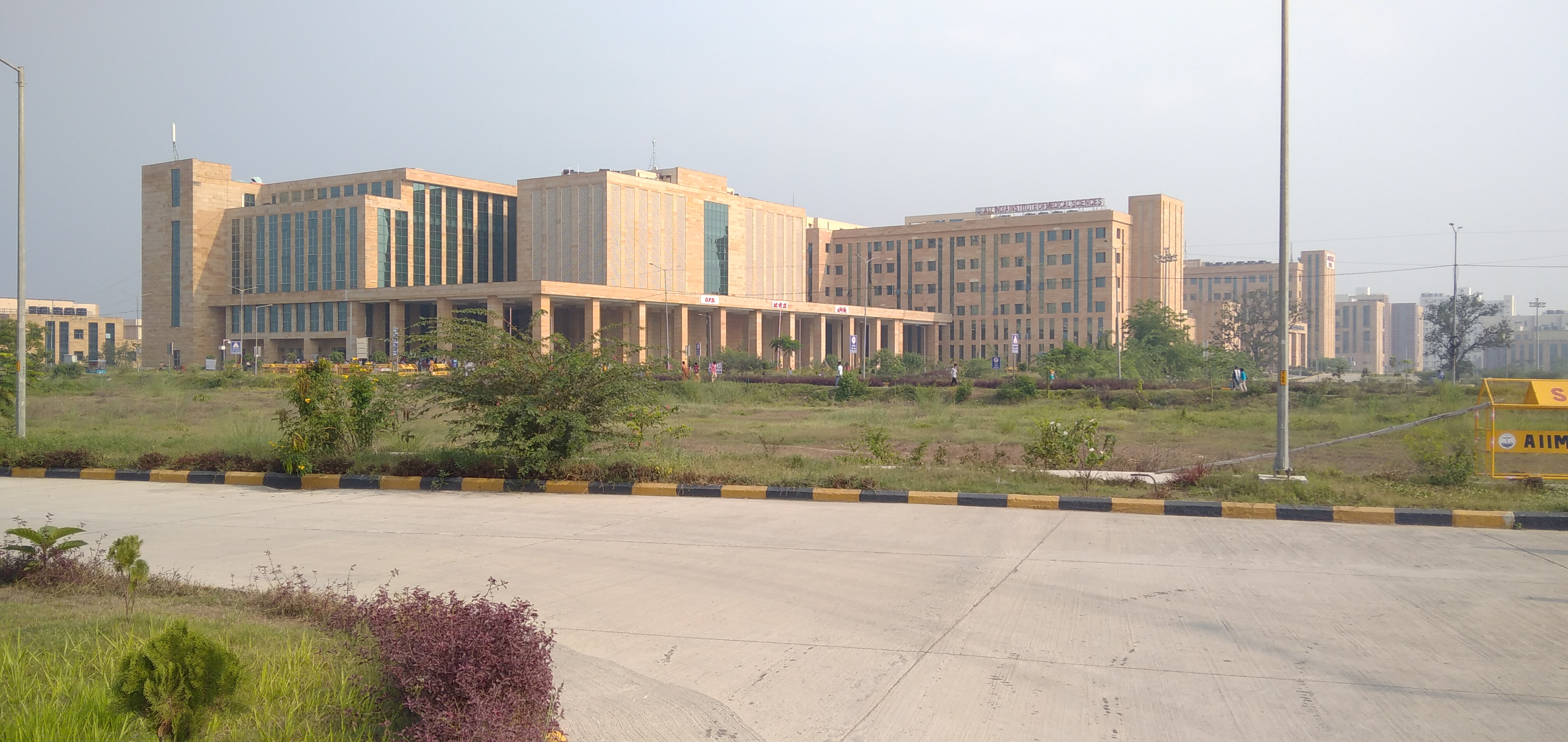
All India Institute of Medical Sciences, Kalyani, West Bengal.

In July 2014, in the budget speech for 2014–15, the Minister of Finance Arun Jaitley announced a budget of ₹500 crore (equivalent to ₹872 crore or US$93 million in 2026) for setting up four new AIIMS, in Andhra Pradesh, West Bengal, the Vidarbha region of Maharashtra and the Purvanchal region in Uttar Pradesh. These "Phase-IV" institutes, became AIIMS Mangalagiri in Andhra Pradesh and AIIMS Nagpur in Maharashtra, established in 2018 and later AIIMS Gorakhpur in Uttar Pradesh and AIIMS Kalyani in West Bengal, which started operation in 2019.

=== Phase V ===
On 28 February 2015, in the 2015–2016 budget speech, Jaitley announced five more AIIMS, in Jammu & Kashmir, Himachal Pradesh, Punjab, Assam and Tamil Nadu and an "AIIMS-like" institute in Bihar. On 7 November 2015, Prime Minister of India Narendra Modi had announced development package for Jammu & Kashmir which includes the setting up of two AIIMS, in the capital cities of Jammu and Kashmir. Of these seven "Phase-V" institutes, sites have been assigned for at Changsari, near Guwahati, in Assam, Vijay Pur in the Jammu Division of Jammu and Kashmir, Awantipora in the Kashmir Division of Jammu and Kashmir, Bathinda in Punjab, Bilaspur in Himachal Pradesh, Madurai in Tamil Nadu and the latest, Darbhanga in Bihar, which was finally approved in September 2020. and Prime Minister Narendra Modi laid the foundation stone for AIIMS Darbhanga on November 13, 2024. In December 2018 the government has approved and assigned partial funds for the AIIMS in Madurai, and a foundation stone was set in January 2019. AIIMS Bathinda started operation in 2019. AIIMS Bilaspur, AIIMS Guwahati and AIIMS Vijaypur became operational in 2020.

=== Phase VI ===
On 1 February 2017, in the budget presentation for 2017–2018, Jaitley announced two more AIIMS, in Jharkhand and Gujarat. Of these "Phase-VI" institutes, sites were identified in Deoghar for the institute in Jharkhand and in Khandheri near Rajkot for Gujarat. AIIMS Deoghar started operation in 2019 and AIIMS Rajkot in 2020.

=== Phase VII ===
A week after the 2017–2018 budget presentation, on 9 February 2017, Jaitley announced an AIIMS in Telangana. On 17 December 2018, the cabinet approved the AIIMS, to be located in Bibinagar, near Hyderabad. This institute was later denoted as "Phase-VII". It started operation in August 2019.

=== Phase VIII ===
On 1 February 2019, in the presentation of the interim budget for 2019–2020, Piyush Goyal, who was given temporary charge of the Minister of Finance a week earlier, announced an AIIMS in Haryana. This institute was later denoted as "Phase-VIII". In March, the cabinet approved the institute in Majra Mustal Bhalkhi, Rewari district.

=== Additional proposed AIIMSs ===
On 1 March 2022, prime minister Narendra Modi announced an AIIMS for the state of Manipur under the Atmanirbhar Bharat Scheme.

== List of Institutes ==
As of November 2026, 5 AIIMS still are under development. AIIMS in Rewari and J-K's Awantipora to be completed by Dec 2026, AIIMS Darbhanga by Jul 2029 said by Centre in Lok Sabha recently. Through classes have been starting since 2021-22 in AIIMS Madurai, it's construction are expected to complete by 2028. There are also proposals for establishing AIIMS in Arunachal Pradesh, Goa, Mizoram, and Tripura.

AIIMSs and locations
| No. | Name | Announced | Established First Batch MBBS | City/Town | State/UT | Phase | Status | Annual Budget | MBBS Intake | NIRF Ranking | Overall NIRF Ranking |
|---|---|---|---|---|---|---|---|---|---|---|---|
| 1 | AIIMS Delhi | 1952 | 1956 | Delhi | Delhi | | Functional | ₹5,500.92 crore (US$590 million) | 125+7 | 1 | 7 |
| 2 | AIIMS Bhopal | 2003 | 2012 | Bhopal | Madhya Pradesh | I | Functional | | 125 | 31 | |
| 3 | AIIMS Bhubaneswar | 2003 | 2012 | Bhubaneswar | Odisha | I | Functional | | 125 | 15 | |
| 4 | AIIMS Jodhpur | 2003 | 2012 | Jodhpur | Rajasthan | I | Functional | | 150 | 16 | 83 |
| 5 | AIIMS Patna | 2003 | 2012 | Patna | Bihar | I | Functional | | 125 | 26 | 99 |
| 6 | AIIMS Raipur | 2003 | 2012 | Raipur | Chhattisgarh | I | Functional | | 125 | 38 | |
| 7 | AIIMS Rishikesh | 2003 | 2012 | Rishikesh | Uttarakhand | I | Functional | | 125 | 14 | 74 |
| 8 | AIIMS Mangalagiri | 2014 | 2018 | Mangalagiri-Tadepalli | Andhra Pradesh | IV | Functional | | 125 | | |
| 9 | AIIMS Nagpur | 2014 | 2018 | Nagpur | Maharashtra | IV | Functional | | 125 | | |
| 10 | AIIMS Raebareli | 2012 | 2019 | Raebareli | Uttar Pradesh | II | Functional | | 100 | | |
| 11 | AIIMS Kalyani | 2014 | 2019 | Kalyani | West Bengal | IV | Functional | | 125 | | |
| 12 | AIIMS Gorakhpur | 2015 | 2019 | Gorakhpur | Uttar Pradesh | IV | Functional | | 125 | | |
| 13 | AIIMS Bathinda | 2015 | 2019 | Bathinda | Punjab | V | Functional | | 100 | | |
| 14 | AIIMS Deoghar | 2017 | 2019 | Deoghar | Jharkhand | VI | Functional | | 125 | | |
| 15 | AIIMS Bibinagar | 2017 | 2019 | Bibinagar | Telangana | VII | Functional | | 100 | | |
| 16 | AIIMS Guwahati | 2015 | 2020 | Changsari | Assam | V | Functional | | 100 | | |
| 17 | AIIMS Jammu | 2015 | 2020 | Vijaypur | Jammu and Kashmir | V | Functional | | 62 | | |
| 18 | AIIMS Bilaspur | 2015 | 2020 | Bilaspur | Himachal Pradesh | V | Functional | | 100 | | |
| 19 | AIIMS Rajkot | 2017 | 2020 | Rajkot | Gujarat | VI | Functional | | 50 | | |
| 20 | AIIMS Madurai | 2015 | 2021 | Madurai | Tamil Nadu | V | Not yet constructed, classes have already begun | | 50 | | |
| 21 | AIIMS Rewari | 2019 | 2026 | Rewari | Haryana | VIII | Not yet constructed expected time Dec 2026-Early 2027, classes have already begun | | 50 | | |
| 22 | AIIMS Awantipora | 2015 | Under Construction | Awantipora | Jammu and Kashmir | V | Under construction | | 100 | | |
| 23 | AIIMS Darbhanga | 2015 | Under Construction | Darbhanga | Bihar | V | Under construction | | 100 | | |
| 24 | AIIMS Manipur | 2022 | Announced | | Manipur | | Announced | | | | |
| 25 | AIIMS Karnataka | 2022 | Proposed | | Karnataka | | Proposed | | | | |
| 26 | AIIMS Kozhikode | 2022 | Proposed | Kozhikode | Keralam | | Proposed | | | | |
| 27 | AIIMS Nagaki | 2026 | Proposed | Nagaki | Nagaland | | Proposed | | | | |
| 28 | AIIMS Raiganj | 2026 | Proposed | Raiganj | West Bengal | | Proposed | | | | |

== Admissions ==
AIIMS (Delhi) was originally established as a super-specialty tertiary care center with primary emphasis on research and specialized training facilities. MBBS is the basic medical course at bachelor's degree level. This is followed by master's degree level specialization in general surgery, general internal medicine, pediatrics and other fields. Super specialties are those healthcare fields whose practitioners need specialized certification after completing their postgraduation, examples being cardiothoracic and vascular surgery, rheumatology, neurology, and pediatric neurology. There are at least 45 super specialties at AIIMS (Delhi) at higher master's degree level. AIIMS also offers MSc and PhD level research courses.

There are about forty-two specialty post-graduate courses conducted at AIIMS (Delhi). The entry is through a nationwide competitive examination, INICET(Institute of National Importance Common Entrance Test), held every six months. Each year nearly 50 thousand medical graduates and 25 thousand dental graduates across the country compete for the limited number of positions, approximately <1% of the candidates are admitted through the process. AIIMS publishes The National Medical Journal of India.

=== Changes in Entrance Examination pattern under the provisions of NMC Bill 2019 ===
As per the latest official notification released by the Ministry of Health and Family Welfare, AIIMS, JIPMER, PGIMER Chandigarh & all INIs (Institutes of National Importance) were directed to not conduct any Undergraduate entrance exams from 2020 onwards. Government has said that from 2020 session onwards, all such undergraduate admissions would be taken up only through a single national level examination NEET-UG conducted by NTA (National Testing Agency). Many field experts however criticized this exam unification, specifically with respect to AIIMS (Delhi), citing the reason that the level of questions in AIIMS-UG entrance exams (for both MBBS & BSc Nursing courses separately) used to be of such a higher & deep logical-conceptual thinking capabilities, that they eventually served a greater advantage for selecting the most desirable students for such scientific courses.

== See also ==
- Healthcare in India
- Indian states ranking by institutional delivery
- List of hospitals in India
- Health policy
