= Pran Nath Chhuttani =

Indian physician (1915 – 1996)

Director of Postgraduate Institute of Medical Education and Research
- In office 1969–1978
- Preceded by: Santokh Singh Anand
- Succeeded by: Iqbal Chand Pathak

Personal details
- Born: 26 February 1915 Leiah
- Died: 16 July 1996 (aged 81)
- Relations: Rai Bahadur Tilok Chand (grand father); Rai Sahib Rup Narain (father)
- Awards: Padma Bhushan; 1972

Pran Nath Chhuttani (26 February 1915 – 16 July 1996) was an Indian physician and medical educator, recognized for his role in establishing and developing Postgraduate Institute of Medical Education and Research, Chandigarh.

== Early life ==
Pran Nath Chhuttani was born on 26 February 1915 in Leiah, now part of Pakistan. He completed his M.B.B.S. (Bachelor of Medicine, Bachelor of Surgery) at Punjab University, Lahore, in 1938. He earned a D.T.M. (Diploma in Tropical Medicine) from the University of Calcutta in 1940 and an M.D. (Doctor of Medicine) from Punjab University, Lahore in 1942. Before his time as a medical student, he volunteered in the aftermath of the 1935 Quetta earthquake, assisting patients despite contracting severe dysentery that required extended hospitalization.

Post-independence, his family relocated to Gangtok, where his father held the position of Chief Judge. In 1949, he was awarded a Commonwealth Scholarship and pursued further studies in the United Kingdom. When he returned to India, he worked at the Government Medical College in Amritsar and also ran a private practice.

== Career ==
The Postgraduate Institute of Medical Education and Research was established in 1962 in Chandigarh. Chhuttani, along with Dr. Tulsi Das and Dr. Santokh Singh Anand, proposed the idea for the institute. Punjab Chief Minister Partap Singh Kairon supported the plan and got approval from Prime Minister Jawaharlal Nehru. Chhuttani became the institute's first Dean and later its Director in 1969, serving for nine years—the longest tenure in PGIMER's history. During his leadership, PGIMER gained prominence as a leading medical research and educational institution, though it also faced challenges, including controversies related to the death of Justice D.S. Lamba and the treatment of Jai Prakash Narayan.

Chhuttani published over 150 research papers on health sciences, focusing on tropical medicine and communicable diseases. He was elected a Fellow of the Indian Academy of Sciences, Bengaluru in 1975 under the Medicine section. Dr. Chhuttani was the recipient of several prestigious awards, including:

- The Padma Bhushan from the Government of India in 1972.
- The Dr. B. C. Roy Award from the Medical Council of India.
- The Shakuntala Amir Chand Prize from the Indian Council of Medical Research.

He also served as the President of The Tribune Trust, helping expand its operations, including setting up a printing press in Gurgaon. He also established the Tirlok Tirath Vidyavati Chhuttani Charitable Trust, which supports medical relief and research.

== Death and legacy ==
Chhuttani died on 16 July 1996. After his death, several honours were established in his name:

- PN Chuttani Award (1998) by the Indian Society of Gastroenterology to recognise outstanding contributions in gastroenterology.
- Dr. Pran Nath Chhuttani Oration (1999) by the National Academy of Medical Sciences to promote studies in tropical medicine and communicable diseases.

Additionally, the Chhuttani Medical Centre in Chandigarh stands as a tribute to his enduring impact on healthcare in the region.
