= Anil Bhansali =

Indian endocrinologist

Dr Anil Bhansali is an Indian academic from Chandigarh. He is an endocrinologist and his research area includes endocrinology, diabetes and cardiovascular diseases. Bhansali is the recipient of Dr. B. C. Roy Award award. Dr Anil was the head of department for Endocrinology at Postgraduate Institute of Medical Education and Research, Chandigarh. He was also the visiting professor at University of Graz, Austria.

== Publications ==
- Clinical Rounds in Endocrinology - Volume I & II
- Presentation and outcome of rhino-orbital-cerebral mucormycosis in patients with diabetes in British Medical Journal
- Type 2 diabetes and risk of prostate cancer: a meta-analysis of observational studies in Nature Journal
- Efficacy of autologous bone marrow–derived stem cell transplantation in patients with type 2 diabetes mellitus
