= Santokh Singh Anand =

Indian surgeon (1909–1996)

Santokh Singh Anand MBBS FRCS FACS FCCP

Advisor and Secretary of Medical Education for the Government of Jammu and Kashmir
- In office 1972–1975

Director of Postgraduate Institute of Medical Education and Research
- In office 1963–1969
- Succeeded by: Pran Nath Chhuttani

Personal details
- Born: 9 November 1909 Sibi, Baluchistan
- Died: 4 June 1996 (aged 86)
- Occupation: surgeon
- Awards: Dr. B. C. Roy Award; 1977

Santokh Singh Anand (9 November 1909 – 4 June 1996) was an Indian surgeon and medical educator known for his contributions to developing medical education and institutions in India. He was instrumental in establishing the Postgraduate Institute of Medical Education and Research (PGIMER), Chandigarh, and served as its first Director.

== Early life and education ==
Santokh Singh Anand was born on 9 November 1909 in Sibi, Baluchistan (present-day Pakistan). He completed his M.B.B.S. (Bachelor of Medicine, Bachelor of Surgery) at King Edward Medical College, Lahore, in 1932 and earned the Fellowship of the Royal Colleges of Surgeons (FRCS) in 1939. In 1951, he was awarded fellowships from the American College of Surgeons (FACS) and the American College of Chest Physicians (FCCP). Later, in 1960, he became a Fellow of the Academy of Medical Sciences, India (FAMS).

== Career ==
Anand began his career in academia as a lecturer in Anatomy at Government Medical College, Amritsar, where he served from 1940 to 1943. He then joined King Edward Medical College, Lahore, as a Clinical Assistant Professor of Surgery, working there until 1947. Following the partition of India, he relocated to Amritsar, where he became Professor of Surgery at Government Medical College, Amritsar. He held this position from 1947 to 1962, during which he also served as the Medical Superintendent of Victoria Jubilee Hospital, Amritsar, from 1956 to 1958. He was later appointed Principal of the Medical College, a role he held from 1958 to 1962.

In 1962, the Postgraduate Institute of Medical Education and Research (PGIMER) was established in Chandigarh. Dr. S. S. Anand, along with Dr. Tulsi Das and Dr. Pran Nath Chhuttani, proposed the concept of the institute. With the support of Punjab Chief Minister Partap Singh Kairon and approval from Prime Minister Jawaharlal Nehru, PGIMER was established. Anand was appointed as the institute's first Director and served in this capacity from 1963 to 1969, during which time he also served as Professor of Surgery.

After his tenure at PGIMER, Anand worked as Advisor and Secretary of Medical Education for the Government of Jammu & Kashmir from 1972 to 1975.

=== Professional roles ===
Anand held several distinguished academic and professional positions, including:

- Hunterian Professor at the Royal College of Surgeons of England (1956).
- Fellowship of the Rockefeller Foundation (1961).
- Visiting professor at the Royal Postgraduate Medical School, Hammersmith (1967).
- Honorary Consulting Surgeon to the Armed Forces of India (from 1968).
- Honorary Surgeon to first four President of India.

He also contributed to medical organizations:

- President, Association of Surgeons of India (1959) and its Thoracic Section (1960).
- President, Scientific Section of the Association of Chest Diseases.
- Vice-president, National Third World Conference on Medical Education, New Delhi (1966).
- Vice-president, Indian Academy of Medical Sciences.
- Member, Medical Council of India; Scientific Advisory Board of the Indian Council of Medical Research (ICMR).
- President, Selection Board of the Union Public Service Commission.
- Fellow, Indian Academy of Medical Sciences; Senate and Syndicate of Panjab University and Punjabi University.

In 1977, the Medical Council of India awarded Anand the Dr. B. C. Roy Award in the category of "Eminent Medical Teacher in Surgery".

== Legacy ==
S. S. Anand died on 4 June 1996. In 2009, the Association of Surgeons of India established the Prof. Santokh Singh Anand Endowment Lecture in his memory to honour his contributions to surgery and medical education.
