= Amod Gupta =

Indian ophthalmologist

Dr. Amod Gupta is an ophthalmologist at the Advanced Eye Centre & dean at PGIMER, Chandigarh. An elected fellow of the National Academy of Medical Sciences, he has been conferred Padma Shri, India's fourth largest civilian honour in 2014.
