= Indira Gandhi Medical College and Hospital =

Hospital in Himachal Pradesh, India

Coordinates: 31.1072°N 77.1830°E

Indira Gandhi Medical College and Hospital (IGMCH)
- इंदिरा गांधी राजकीय आयुर्विज्ञान महाविद्यालय और अस्पताल
- Former names: Himachal Pradesh Medical College
- Motto: सर्वे भवन्तु सुखिनः सर्वे सन्तु निरामयाः
- Motto in English: May all be happy, May all be disease free,
- Type: Public Medical School
- Established: 1966; 60 years ago
- Affiliations: Atal Medical and Research University
- Principal: Dr. Sita Thakur
- Location: Shimla, Himachal Pradesh
- Campus: Urban
- Website: www.igmcshimla.edu.in

Indira Gandhi Medical College and Hospital (IGMCH), formerly Himachal Pradesh Medical College, is a public medical college and hospital located in Snowdown area of Lakkar Bazaar, Shimla, Himachal Pradesh, India.

== History ==
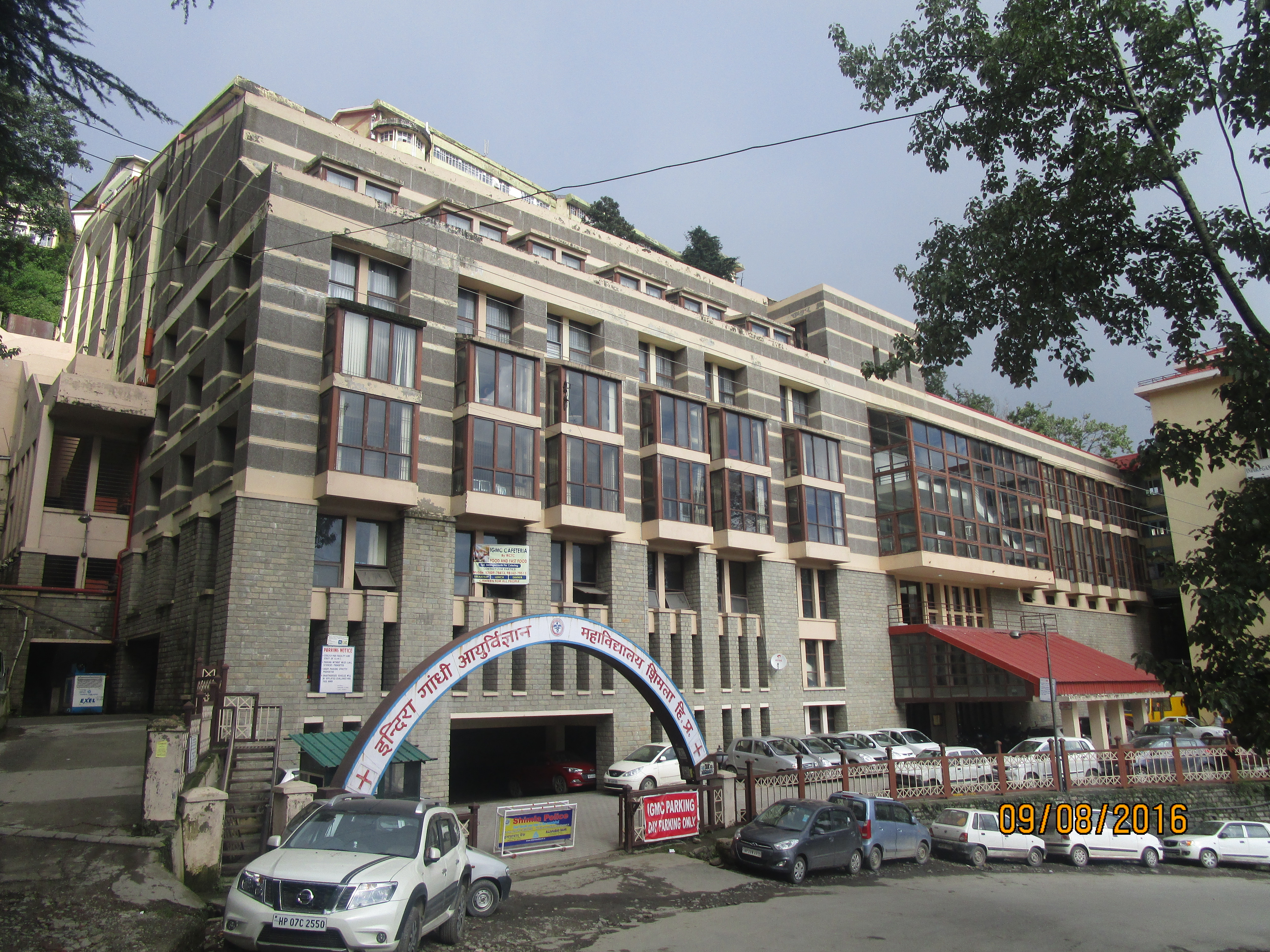
IGMC Shimla entrance

The college was established in 1966 as the Himachal Pradesh Medical College (HPMC), and assumed the present name in 1984. On 29 June 2013, Himachal Pradesh Health minister Kaul Singh Thakur said that Indira Gandhi Medical College (IGMC) would be upgraded on the analogy of All India Institute of Medical Sciences (AIIMS) under the Pradhan Mantri Swasthya Sewa Yojana, (PMSSY). The minister stated that during his meeting with Union health minister Ghulam Nabi Azad, the proposal for granting the AIIMS status to IGMC was under consideration of the government of India. The minister also added that the endeavour of the state government was to develop IGMC as a prestigious institute so that it can provide qualitative and better health services to the people of the state.

== Regional Cancer Centre ==
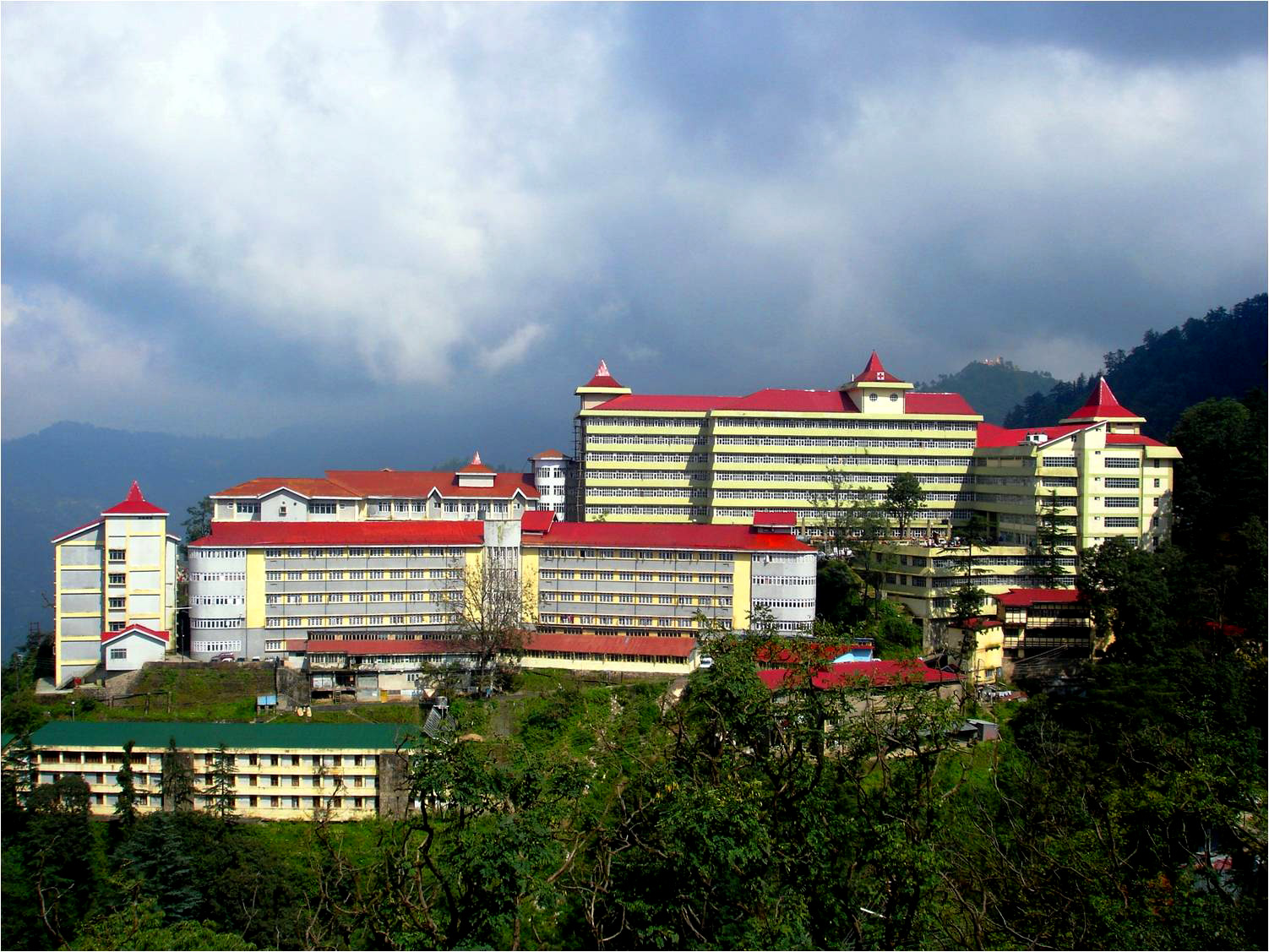
IGMC Shimla

The Department of Radiotherapy & Oncology of this institution is an approved Regional Cancer Centre of India. It was founded in 1977 as a Tumor Clinic of the hospital and was granted the status of RCC in 2001.

== Notable alumni ==
- Dr. Randeep Guleria - former Director of AIIMS New Delhi and former President of AIIMS Bilaspur
- Dr. Jagat Ram - Former director, PGIMER Chandigarh
- Arvind Rajwanshi - former Director of AIIMS Raebareli
