= Arignar Anna Memorial Cancer Hospital & Research Institute =

Geography
- Location: Chennai Bangalore Highway NH 4, Karapettai, Kanchipuram, Tamil Nadu, India
- Coordinates: 12°52′12″N 79°42′57″E

Organisation
- Type: Hospital
- Affiliated university: M.G.R. Medical University; NABH

Services
- Beds: 290

History
- Opened: 21.03.1969

Links
- Website: www.aamci.ac.in
- Lists: Hospitals in India

Arignar Anna Memorial Cancer Hospital & Research Institute is a state-owned medical college, hospital and research institute in India. It is located in Karapettai, Kancheepuram, Tamil Nadu. It was named after C. N. Annadurai, former Chief Minister of Tamil Nadu. This institution in now a Regional Cancer Centre approved by the Government of India.
