= Ranjit Roy Chaudhury =

Indian pharmacologist

- Chaudhury in a 2012 NDTV Profit interview
- Born: 4 November 1930; Patna, Bihar, British Raj
- Died: 27 October 2015 (aged 84); Chennai, Tamil Nadu, India
- Occupations: Clinical pharmacologist Medical academic Health planner
- Parent(s): P. C. Roy Chaudhury; Indu Roy Chaudhury
- Awards: Padma Shri; Dr. B. C. Roy Award; Shanti Swarup Bhatnagar Award; Unichem Award; Chulalongkorn University Award; Amrut Modi Award; Vishisht Bihari Samman

Ranjit Roy Chaudhury, FRCPE (4 November 1930 – 27 October 2015) was an Indian clinical pharmacologist, medical academic and health planner who headed the National Committee for formulating the policy and guidelines on drugs and clinical trials in India. He was the chairman of the joint programme of the World Health Organization and Government of India on Rational Use of Drugs in India. He was the founder president of the Delhi Medical Council and the president of the Delhi Society for Promotion of Rational Use of Drugs.

A recipient of the Shanti Swarup Bhatnagar Award and the Dr. B. C. Roy Award, Chaudhury was awarded the Padma Shri, the fourth highest civilian award of the Government of India, in 1998.

== Biography ==
Chaudhury was born in 1930 in Patna, in the Indian state of Bihar, to Indu and P.C. Roy Chaudhury. His graduate studies in medicine were at the Prince of Wales Medical College,(present Patna Medical College and Hospital) Patna. Later, he secured a DPhil from Lincoln College, Oxford. He joined the All India Institute of Medical Sciences Delhi in 1958 and served as an assistant professor until 1960, when he moved to Ciba-Geigy Research Center, Bombay as a professor of pharmacology.

In 1964, he was appointed as the Head of the Department of Pharmacology at the Post Graduate Institute of Medical Education and Research (PGIMER), Chandigarh. He served the institution as its dean and superannuated in 1980 as its director, during which time he started a DM course in clinical pharmacology, the first in India. When the Indian Council of Medical Research set up the Toxicology Review Panel, he was appointed as its founding chairman.

His next posting was at the World Health Organization (WHO), based in Geneva. His service with WHO lasted until 1991; he also worked at the Regional Offices at Alexandria and Yangon and at the Chulalongkorn University, Bangkok. Returning to India in 1991, he was involved in various medical organization activities. He was one of the co-founders of Delhi Medical Council, working as its founder president and served PGIMER as the chairman of its selection committee, while retaining his position as a WHO consultant. He was also involved with the National Institute of Immunology, New Delhi as the Emeritus Scientist, holding the post till 2005.

During this period, Chaudhury chaired the Board of Trustees of the International Clinical Epidemiological Network (INCLEN) for two terms until 2006 and held its membership. He was also a member of the Sub-Commission in Macroeconomics and Health set up by the Government of India in 2005. He became a non-executive independent director of the Indraprastha Medical Corporation in 2008 but relinquished the post in 2014 when he was appointed as the Advisor to the Ministry of Health and Family Welfare. He had also been a Non-Executive Director of Super Religare Laboratories and a member of the Task Force for Research of the Apollo Hospitals Educational and Research Foundation. He sat in the governing bodies of several medical and health institutions and organizations such as PGIMER, Population Foundation of India, Indraprastha Institute of Information Technology, and the Foundation for Revitalization of Local Health Traditions and the Advisory Council of the India International Centre.

In February 2013, the Ministry of Health and Family Welfare constituted a committee, National Committee for formulating the policy and guidelines on drugs and clinical trials in India, under the chairmanship of Chaudhury. The committee submitted a report. Professor Ranjit Roy Chaudhury Expert Committee to Formulate Policy and Guidelines for Approval of New Drugs, Clinical Trials and Banning of Drugs, recommending significant changes in the system. Researchers acknowledged the usefulness of his proposals. The Ministry subsequently accepted the proposals. Besides 275 articles in national and international journals, he has written 25 textbooks of medical education and a book on Ayurveda, titled The Healing Powers of Herbs.

Chaudhury died on 27 October 2015, eight days before his 85th birthday, during a visit to Chennai, Tamil Nadu, where he was attending a conference on Pharmacovigilance.

== Awards and honours ==
Chaudhury, the first Indian doctor to receive a Rhodes Scholarship in 1955, was a Fellow of the Royal College of Physicians of Edinburgh and a recipient of the degree of Doctor of Science (Honoris Causa) from the Chulalongkorn University. He was the Patron of the India chapter of the International Society For Pharmacoeconomics and Outcomes Research (ISPOR) and an Emeritus Professor and an elected Fellow of the National Academy of Medical Sciences. The Council of Scientific and Industrial Research awarded him the Shanti Swarup Bhatnagar Award, the highest Indian award in the science and technology category, in 1969, and the Medical Council of India honoured him with the Dr. B. C. Roy Award, the highest Indian medical award.

The Government of India included him in the 1998 Republic Day Honours list for the civilian award of the Padma Shri. The Federation of Indian Chambers of Commerce and Industry (FICCI) awarded him the Lifetime Achievement Award in 2013. He was also a recipient of awards such as Vishisht Bihari Samman, Unichem Award, Chulalongkorn University Award, and the Amrut Modi Award of the UNITRUST.

== See also ==
- Post Graduate Institute of Medical Education and Research
- Indraprastha Institute of Information Technology

== Bibliography ==
- Ranjit Roy Chaudhury (1960). The Healing Powers of Herbs. Sterling Publishers. ASIN B00ZLVDZSM.
- Ranjit Roy Chaudhury; J. S. Bapna (1997). "Essential drugs and lower costs". Who – Iris. 18 (34): 345–347.
