= P. K. Dave =

Director

- Born: India
- Occupation: Orthopedic surgeon
- Known for: Arthroscopic Surgery
- Awards: Padma Shri

Pradeep Kumar Dave is an Indian orthopedic surgeon and the chairman of Medeor Hospital, New Delhi. He graduated from the All India Institute of Medical Sciences, Delhi (AIIMS) and joined the Institute as a member of faculty, superannuating in 2003 as a director. Later, he joined Medeor Hospital as the head of the Orthopedic Department and is the incumbent chairman of its advisory board.

Dave is a former editor of the Indian Journal of Orthopedics and has served as the president of the Association of Spine Surgeons of India. He is an Emeritus Professor of the National Academy of Medical Sciences (NAMS) and is a Fellow of Royal College of Physicians and Surgeons of Glasgow, Indian Orthopaedics Association, National Academy of Medical Sciences, International Medical Science Academy, and the Indian chapter of the International College of Surgeons. The Government of India awarded him the fourth highest civilian award of the Padma Shri in 2000, for his services in the fields of ecology and environment.

== See also ==
- All India Institute of Medical Sciences Delhi
