= T. S. Chandrasekar =

Indian gastroenterologist

- Born: 14 July 1956 (age 70); Madurai, Tamil Nadu, India
- Occupations: Gastroenterologist; Medical administrator
- Years active: Since 1977
- Known for: Endoscopy; Medindia Hospitals
- Awards: Padma Shri; TNMGRMU Best Doctor Award
- Website: drtschandrasekar.com

Thoguluva Shesadri Chandrasekar (born 1956) is an Indian gastroenterologist and the founder chairman of Medindia Hospitals, a healthcare facility based in Chennai. He is credited with the performance of over 23,000 endoscopy procedures and is known for the Braille chart on personal hygiene he prepared in 2015 for the visually impaired people. The Government of India awarded him the fourth highest civilian honour of the Padma Shri, in 2016, for his contributions to medicine.

== Biography ==
T. S. Chandrasekar, born on 14 July 1956, graduated in medicine in 1977 from Madurai Medical College winning the gold medal for the best outgoing student and followed it up with the degrees of MD and DM from Post Graduate Institute of Medical Education and Research, Chandigarh. He started his career as a member of faculty at Coimbatore Medical College where he established the department of medical gastroenterology. Later, he founded Medindia Hospitals at Nungambakkam which has since grown to become a super-specialty healthcare centre for gastro-intestinal diseases.

Chandrasekar is the founder of Medindia Charitable Trust, which is involved in healthcare services to the poor people through free medical camps, health awareness programs, and concessional treatment. He is a former president of the Society of GastroIntestinal Endoscopy of India (2007–08) where he sits in the advisory board of its journal. The incumbent national president of the Indian Society of Gastroenterology, he is credited with the performance of over 23000 endoscopy procedures. He prepared a braille chart for personal hygiene in 2015, for use by the visually impaired people and has prepared fourteen CD-ROMs for teaching endoscopic surgical procedures. He is one of the pioneers of Peroral Endoscopic Myotomy in India, an endoscopic surgical technique involving the insertion of a knife into the oesophagus to remove the blockages in the food pipe. He has published several articles on the subject, many of them published in international referred journals. He is a recipient of the Best Doctor Award of the Tamil Nadu Dr. M.G.R. Medical University and serves as an adjunct professor at the university. The Royal College of Physicians and Surgeons of Glasgow honored him with their fellowship in 2009 and the Government of India awarded him the civilian honor of the Padma Shri in 2016.
