= G. S. Sainani =

Indian physician

- Born: Larkana, Sindh, British India (Present day: Larkana, Sindh, Pakistan)
- Occupations: Physician; Medical researcher Medical writer
- Known for: Cardiologist
- Spouse: Pushpa
- Awards: Padma Shri; Dr. B. C. Roy Award; Priyadarshani Award; Sindhu Ratan Award; API Gifted and Master Teacher Award; President's Lifetime Achievement Award; Honorary Brigadier

Gurumukh Sajanmal Sainani is an Indian general physician, medical researcher, medical writer and an emeritus Professor of the National Academy of Medical Sciences. He is a former director of the All India Heart Foundation and the incumbent director of Jaslok Hospital, Mumbai. He is a recipient of the highest Indian award in the medical category, Dr. B. C. Roy Award, from the Medical Council of India and the rank of Honorary Brigadier from the President of India. The Government of India awarded him the fourth highest civilian award of the Padma Shri in 2000.

== Biography ==
Sainani, after graduating in medicine with a first class which earned him the Prince of Wales Prize, continued his studies to obtain a PhD from Pune University. Later, he pursued his research to secure a DSc, reported to be the first doctor to receive a DSc degree purely on the merit of research, from Pune University. He worked at Grant Medical College and Sir Jamshedjee Jeejeebhoy Group of Hospitals, Mumbai for several years, reportedly rose to the post of the Professor and Head of the Department of Medicine at the age of 32, and becoming the emeritus Professor of the institution, post retirement. During this period, he did advanced training in cardiology for two years in Chicago and one year in London. Joining Jaslok Hospital, he serves as a senior consultant and is the Head of the Hypertension Clinic at the hospital.

Sainani is a Fellow of several medical institutions around the world such as the Royal Australasian College of Physicians, American College of Cardiology, National Academy of Medical Sciences (India), American College of Physicians, American College of Chest Physicians and Royal Society of Medicine among others. He is an emeritus Professor of the National Academy of Medical Sciences (NAMS) and has received honorary DLitt from the Maharashtra University of Health Sciences. He is former president of the Cardiological Society of India and was the chief editor of the 1992 and 1999 editions of API Text Book of Medicine of the Association of Physicians of India He is a former editor of several medical journals, including the Current Concepts in Hypertension and Diabetes Mellitus. He has participated in the International Congress of Editors of Medical Journals, conducted by the World Health Organization in Copenhagen.

The Indian Association of Clinical Medicine (IACM) has instituted G. S. Sainani Oration, an annual event in his honour. The Geriatric Society of India also has instituted an annual oration under the title, "Prof. GS Sainani Oration". Sainani, a recipient of the highest Indian medical award of Dr. B. C. Roy Award, has received several other honours such as Priyadarshani Award, Sindhu Ratan Award, Gifted and Master Teacher Award of the Association of Physicians of India and Lifetime Achievement Award and Honorary Brigadier title of the President of India. The Government of India awarded him the civilian honour of the Padma Shri in 2000.

Sainani married Pushpa, a medical doctor, on 18 May 1963, and the couple has a daughter, Renu, and two sons, Rajesh and Kumar. The family lives in Mumbai.

== Bibliography ==
Sainani has published four books. Clinical Cases and Pearls in Medicine, is a text on diseases and clinical practices, annotated with cases handled by him during his career while A Primer of Cardiac Diagnosis: the physical and technical study of the cardiac patient, is a monograph on cardiac diseases. Manual of Clinical and Practical Medicine is a medical handbook and covers topics such as patient medical history and general physiological examination, supported by 100 case studies. Medical Therapeutics is a text book on the principles of therapeutics and drug prescription guidelines of several diseases. Besides, he has written over 550 medical papers in peer-reviewed national and international journals.

- Gurmukh S. Sainani (2015). Clinical Cases and Pearls in Medicine. Jaypee Brothers Medical Publishers. ISBN 9789351526469.
- Aldo Augusto Luisada, Gurmukh S. Sainani (1968). A Primer of Cardiac Diagnosis: the physical and technical study of the cardiac patient. Warren H Green. p. 243. ISBN 978-0875270494.
- G. S. Sainani (2010). Manual of Clinical and Practical Medicine. Elsevier India. p. 512. ISBN 9788131231593.
- G. S. Sainani (1998). Medical Therapeutics. Elsevier India. p. 670. ISBN 9788181479129.
