= Ravi Kannan R. =

Indian oncologist

Ravi Kannan R
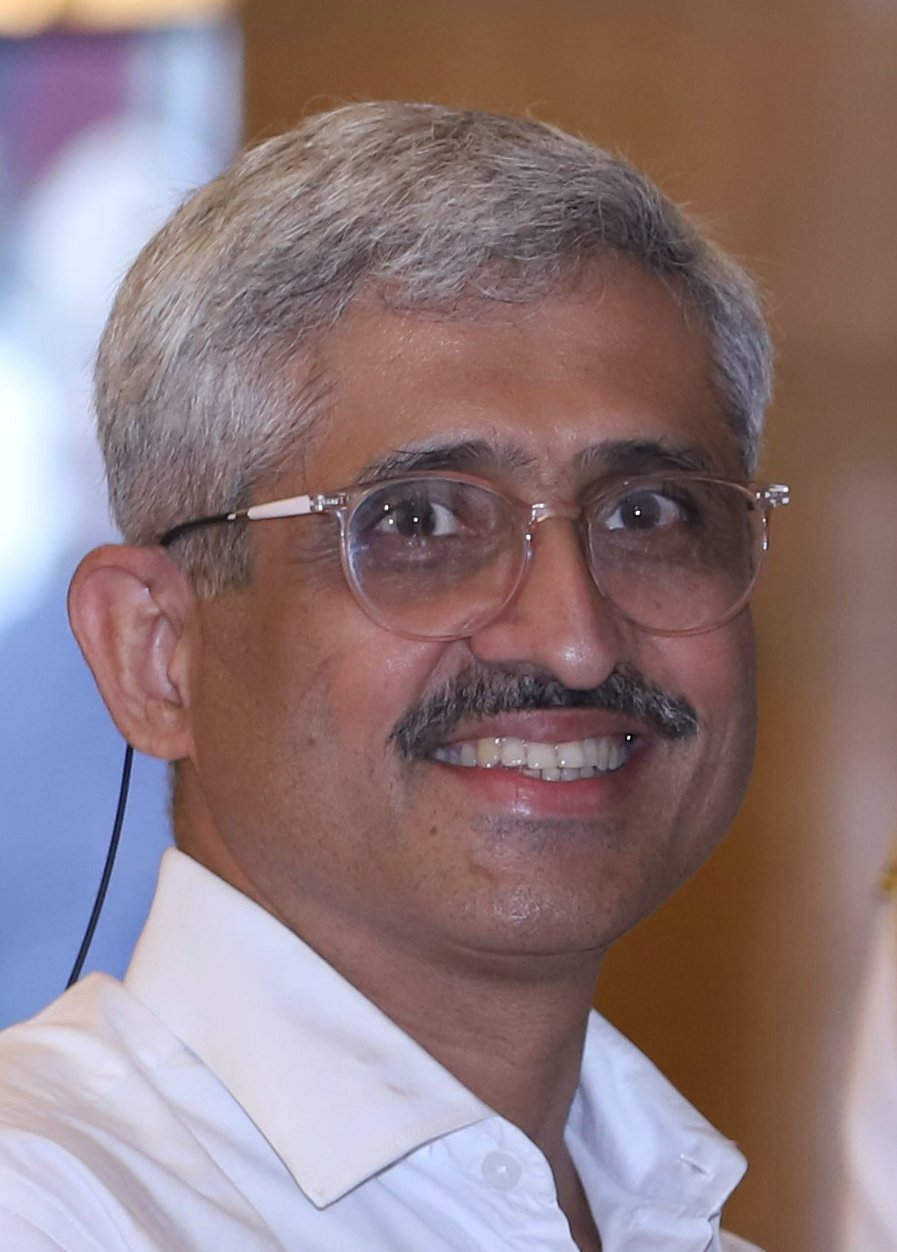
- Kannan R in November 2021
- Born: India
- Occupations: Director, CCHRC
- Known for: Free treatment to cancer patients
- Medical career
- Field: Oncology
- Institutions: Cachar Cancer Hospital and Research Centre (CCHRC)
- Awards: Padma Shri (2020); Mahaveer Award; Ramon Magsaysay Award

Ravi Kannan R is an Indian surgical oncologist, based in Assam. He is the director of Cachar Cancer Hospital and Research Centre (CCHRC), Silchar, a nonprofit hospital, that provides free cancer treatment. He is the former Head of Department of surgical oncology at Adyar Cancer Institute in Chennai. He is a recipient of Padma Shri, one of India's highest civilian honours, and the Ramon Magsaysay Award, the highest award in Asia (called the "Nobel Prize of Asia").

== Education ==
Kannan did his schooling from Kendriya Vidyalaya, Tambaram. And then he graduated with an MBBS degree from the Kilpauk Medical College in Chennai and holds an MS degree from the Maulana Azad Medical College, New Delhi and MCH Surgical Oncology from Cancer Institute, Chennai.

== Career ==
After completing his medical training, Kannan joined the Adyar Cancer Institute where he was heading the surgical oncology department in the early 2000s. In 2006, he visited the Cachar Cancer Hospital and Research Centre for the first time for a consultation on the request of a colleague and that's when he met the then director of CCHRC who invited him to head the centre. Kannan left his practice in Chennai and moved to Assam with his family in 2007 to provide cancer care for the people of Barak Valley and took on the position of Director of the Cachar Cancer Hospital and Research Centre in Silchar. Since 2007, Kannan has continued to work in the region and has made numerous contributions to spreading cancer awareness, heading and collaborating on cancer research studies in the region including setting up a hospital and regional cancer registry, strengthening cancer care facilities, and providing basic and specialised healthcare for cancer patients.

In 2020, during the pandemic, the Cachar Cancer Hospital and Research Centre was converted into a covid hospital. Under his leadership, the hospital worked to provide care to both sets of patients, those fighting cancer and covid-19 infections.

== Awards ==
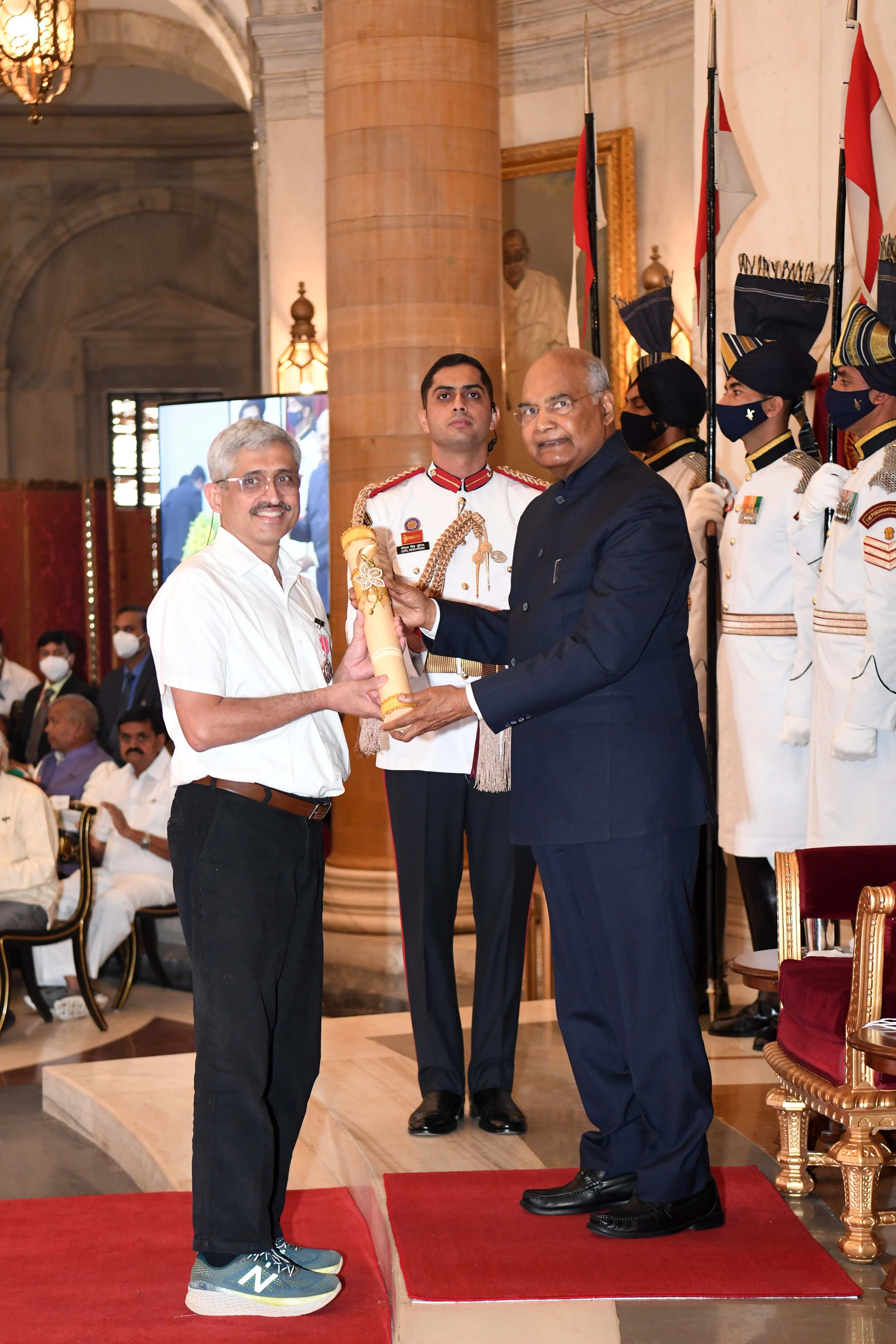
President of India Ram Nath Kovind presents Padma Shri to Ravi Kannan R. for Medicine

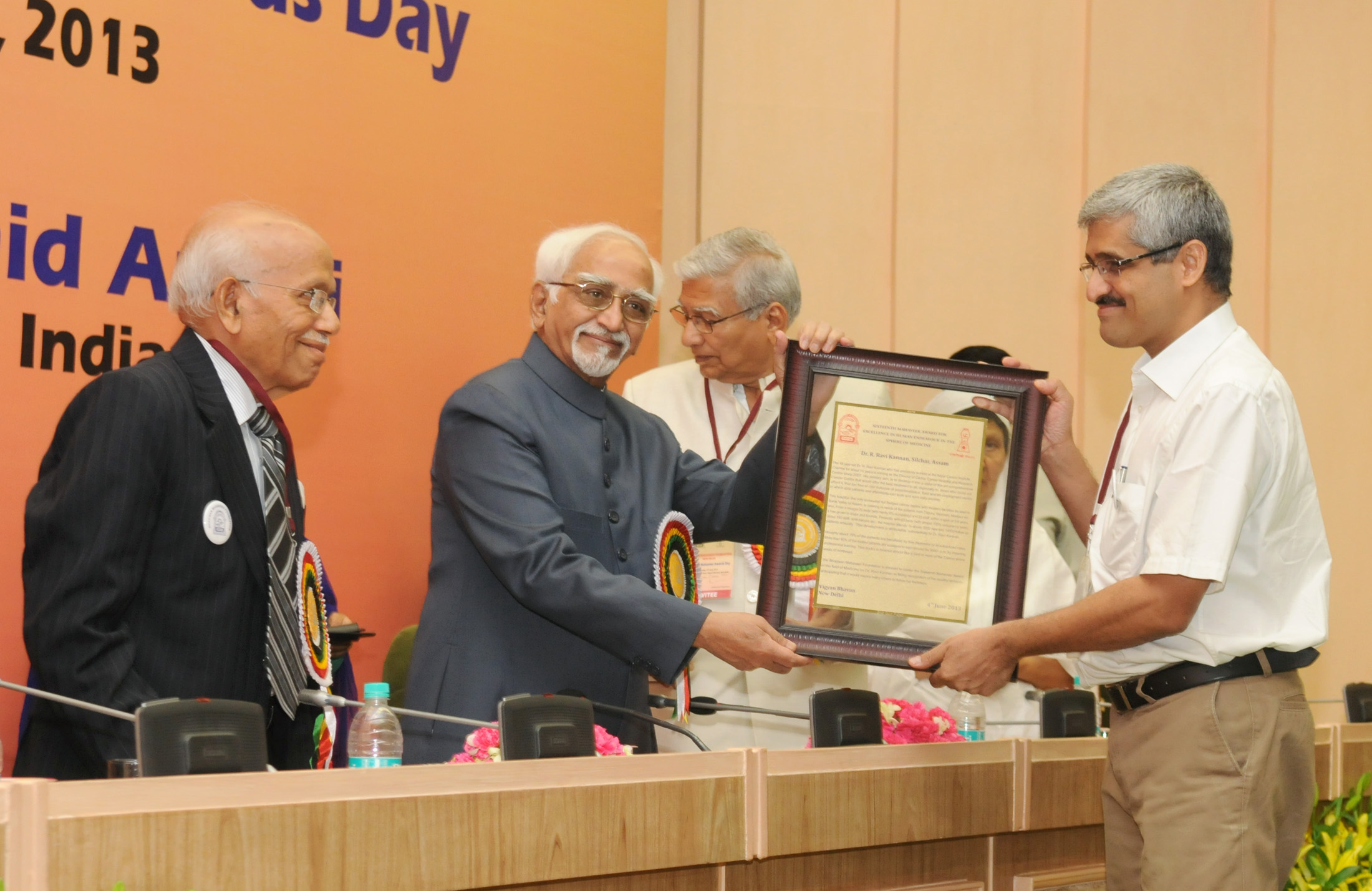
Vice-President of India Mohammad Hamid Ansari presenting Mahaveer Award in Medicine to Ravi Kannan R in 2013

- Ramon Magsaysay Award, 2023
- Padma Shri - 4th highest civilian award of India, was given to him on 26 January 2020.
- Mahaveer award in medicine was given to him in 2013.
