= All India Institute of Medical Sciences, Nagaki =

Government University and Hospital in Nagaki, India

- Type: Public medical school
- Location: Nagaki, Nagaland, India; 25.72°N 93.85°E
- Campus: Urban, 200 acres (81 ha)
- Language: English
- Website: www.aiims.edu

All India Institute of Medical Sciences, Nagaki is a proposed public medical university and hospital in Nagaki in the Chümoukedima District of the Indian state of Nagaland.

== History ==
In May 2026, Nagaland Health Minister P. Paiwang Konyak proposed establishing a greenfield medical college and AIIMS at Nagaki during a meeting with Union Health Minister Jagat Prakash Nadda, who assured support for the proposal. In June 2026, Chief Minister Neiphiu Rio sought central support for the project and identified Nagaki as a future healthcare and education hub.

In August 2026, Konyak announced that the Nagaland government had submitted a formal proposal to the Ministry of Health and Family Welfare, for establishment of a new greenfield AIIMS at Nagaki. Approximately 200 acres of land have been proposed for the institute.

== See also ==
- Nagaland Institute of Medical Science and Research
- All India Institutes of Medical Sciences
