= Chittoor Mohammed Habeebullah =

Indian gastroenterologist

- Born: 1937; Andhra Pradesh, India
- Died: 10 July 2010 (aged 72–73)
- Education: Guntur Medical College (MBBS); Andhra University (MD); Post Graduate Institute of Medical Education and Research (DM)
- Occupation: Gastroenterologist
- Awards: Padma Shri (2001); Khwarizmi International Award (1997)

Chittoor Mohammed Habeebullah was an Indian gastroenterologist, known for his contributions to the medical discipline of gastroenterology in India.

== Early life and background ==
Born in 1937 in the South Indian state of Andhra Pradesh, Habeebullah completed his MBBS degree from Guntur Medical College in 1958. He later obtained his MD in General Medicine from Andhra University and went on to earn his DM from the Post Graduate Institute of Medical Education and Research, Chandigarh.

== Career ==
He started his career as an assistant professor at the Department of Gastroenterology, Osmania Medical College and served as the professor and the Head of the Department from 1975 to 1992 and thereafter as the principal till 1994. He also served as the Director, Centre for Liver Research and Diagnostics, Deccan College of Medical Sciences, Hyderabad and as the Director of Medical Education, Government of Andhra Pradesh. He was a 1997 Fellow of The National Academy of Sciences, India and had many scientific publications to his credit. He died on 10 July 2010, falling to a cardiac arrest.

== Awards and recognition ==
- 1997 - Khwarizmi International Award in 1997.
- 2001 - Awarded the Padma Shri, the fourth-highest civilian award in India, by the Government of India.

== See also ==
- Guntur Medical College
- Post Graduate Institute of Medical Education and Research
- Osmania Medical College
- Deccan College of Medical Sciences
