= Sarbeswar Sahariah =

Indian nephrologist

- Born: April 1, 1945 (age 80); Mangaldai, Darrang, Assam, India
- Occupation: Indian nephrologist
- Awards: Padma Shri; Brahmaiah Sastry Memorial Oration Award; Dr. R. V. S. Yadav Memorial Oration Award; Membership - National Academy of Medical Sciences; Fellowship - International College of Surgeons; Fellowship - American College of Surgeons
- Website: Official web site

Sarbeswar Sahariah is an Indian nephrologist and organ transplant specialist, known for his expertise in renal and pancreatic transplantation. He was honoured by the Government of India, in 2014, by bestowing on him the Padma Shri, the fourth highest civilian award, for his contributions to the field of medicine. Sahariah is credited with more than 3000 renal transplantations, which many consider, has made him the most prolific kidney transplant surgeon in the country.

== Biography ==
Sarbeswar Sahariah was born in a family with meagre financial resources, at Mangaldai on Tengabari Road, a hilly village in the district of Darrang, in the Himalayan state of Assam, India, on 1 April 1945. He did his early schooling at a local school and passed his higher secondary examinations from the Government High School in Mangaldai, in 1962, with the highest marks in the state for Biology. Opting for the medical career, he joined Medical College in Guwahati, on financial assistance for the State Government, meant for economically backward classes and passed MBBS in 1967, from the Gauhati University, standing fourth overall in the examinations. Subsequently, he did the mandatory house surgeoncy at the Safdarjung Hospital, New Delhi, which he completed in 1970. He, then, moved to Chandigarh and worked at the Post Graduate Institute of Medical Education and Research (PGIMER), Chandigarh as a resident, while pursuing the master's degree, passed MS with a bronze medal in 1973 and continued there to complete the senior residency in 1976. While at PGIMER, he had the opportunity to be involved with the first successful renal transplantation, in 1973.

Saharaiah started his career as a Pool Officer under the Council of Scientific and Industrial Research programme at the Renal Transplantation department of PGIMER, in 1976. Later, in 1978, he joined the faculty of PGIMER and worked there till 1981. The next move was to the Organ Transplantation Centre, Institute of Genetics and Hospital for Genetic Diseases, Hyderabad, as the Head of the centre as the Reader and Chief Renal Transplant Surgeon, in 1981, and continued there till 1985. It was here, he performed the first renal transplantation in Hyderabad which is in current State of Telangana, in 1981. Saharaiah resigned from the Government service in 1985 and has since been practicing at various hospitals in the country.

Sahariah lives at Jubilee Hills, an upmarket residential neighbourhood in west Hyderabad, in the present day Telangana state, India, attending to his duties at the Krishna Institute of Medical Sciences in the city, with his wife and two children, a son and a daughter.

== Achievements and legacy ==
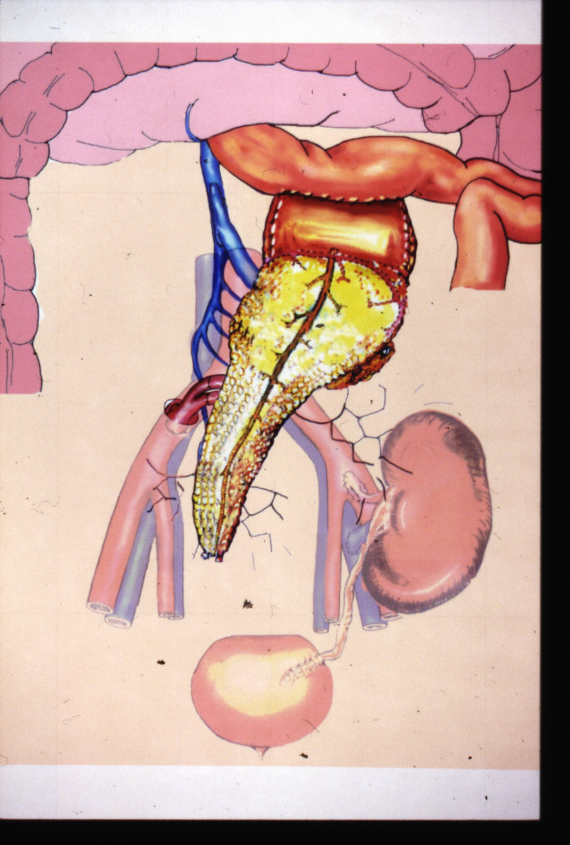
Kidney Pancreas transplantation

Saharaiah is credited with many firsts. He was associated with the first successful kidney transplantation in India, in 1973, while he was working at the Post Graduate Institute of Medical Education and Research, Chandigarh. This was followed by the first kidney transplantation in Hyderabad, in 1981. The first ten renal transplants in the state of Assam are also credited to him, which he did during the period from 1992 to 2003. He is credited with the first cadaver donor renal transplant in Hyderabad, beginning of a career where he would perform eight more such transplants. It is reported that he has successfully performed renal transplants from 18-month-old cadaver, considered to be the youngest donor in India, and from 78-year-old cadaver, regarded as the oldest donor in the country. He is reported to have performed the first laparoscopic donor nephrectomy in the country, in 1988. He has performed renal transplantations in rural areas, another first credited to him, performed at the rural hospital, Jawaharlal Nehru Medical College, Wardha. The reports say he has done more than 3000 renal transplant operations and over 5000 surgeries for vascular access for haemodialysis.

Sahariah's legacy lives on mainly in Telangana and Andhra Pradesh, where he has put in efforts for the propagation of renal transplantation programme. He was instrumental in initiating the programme across the state, including the Nizam's Institute of Medical Sciences and Gandhi Hospital and Medical College. Medical institutions such as Bollineni Hospital, Nellore, CDR Hospital, Visakhapatnam, Pinnamalani Polyclinic, Vijaywada, Seven Hills Hospital, Visakhapatnam, St. Johns Medical College, Bangalore, M. S. Ramaiah Medical College, Bangalore, Sir Ganga Ram Hospital, New Delhi, Down Town Hospital, Guwahati, Damani Hospital, Dibrugarh, Gauhati Medical College and Hospital, J. N. Medical College Hospital, Maharashtra, Suretech Hospital, Nagpur, Orange City Hospital, Nagpur, Hi-tech Medical College Hospital, Bhubaneswar, Kalinga Hospital, Bhubaneswar, and International Hospital have all sought Saharaiah's assistance in setting up the renal programme. He has also strived to spread the message in Assam with a programme by which people from economically poor backgrounds can receive renal transplants at a charity hospital in Hyderabad, the Mahavir Hospital and Research Centre. He has founded a charitable organization, North East Care Foundation, which runs a free medical clinic in Guwahati. The clinic gives free medical consultation and supplies free drugs to patients in the region.

== Research ==
Sahariah has done research on organ transplantation. After undergoing training in Experimental Transplantation and Transplantation Immunology at the School of Medicine, Tokai University, Japan, under Professor K. Tanuji he carried on with his research on the topic. He has also participated in the International Transplant Observership programme at the Massachusetts General Hospital, Boston, USA in 2009. Sahariah is also credited with developing new techniques in islet and segmental pancreatic transplantation. He has published his findings in many peer-reviewed journals.

== Awards and recognitions ==
The Government of India, in 2014, honoured Sahariah, by awarding him the civilian honour of Padma Shri. He has also received many other awards and recognitions such as:

- MAMS - Membership of the National Academy of Medical Sciences, New Delhi - 1979
- FICS - Fellowship of the International College of Surgeons
- FACS - Fellowship of the American College of Surgeons - 1983
- Dr. Brahmaiah Sastry Memorial Oration Award - Andhra Medical College, Visakhapatnam - 2011
- Dr. R. V. S. Yadav Memorial Oration Award - Indian Society of Organ Transplantation, Ludhiana - 2008

Jawaharlal Nehru Medical College, Wardha, Maharashtra, in 2000, honoured Sahariah by appointing him as the Professor Emeritus.

== Publications ==
Saharaiah has written a book, My Journey with Kidney Transplantation describing his life experiences during 1974 - 2004 period. The book was released at a felicitation function organized by the Indian Medical Association, Assam chapter. He has published several research papers in peer-reviewed journals. A random selection of his articles reads as:

- Kesiraju S; Paritala P; Sahariah S. (January 2014). "New onset of diabetes after transplantation - an overview of epidemiology, mechanism of development and diagnosis". Transpl. Immunol. 30 (1): 52–58. doi:10.1016/j.trim.2013.10.006. PMID 24184293.
- Kesiraju S; Paritala P; Rao Ch UM; Athmakuri SM; Reddy VS; Sahariah S. (January 2014). "Anti-thymocyte globulin versus basiliximab induction in renal transplant recipients: Long-term outcome". Saudi J Kidney Dis Transpl. 25 (1): 9–15. doi:10.1016/j.trim.2013.10.006. PMID 24434376.
- Kehoe SH; Chheda PS; Sahariah S; Baird J; Fall CH. (April 2009). "porting of participant compliance in randomized controlled trials of nutrition supplements during pregnancy". Matern Child Nutr. 5 (2): 97–103. doi:10.1111/j.1740-8709.2008.00178.x. PMC 6860801. PMID 19292744.
- Lakshmi Kiran A; Sahariah S; Murthy KJ. (January 2000). "Critical study on the significance of histocompatibility testing in renal transplantation: single-centre experience". Nephron. 84 (1): 79–80. doi:10.1159/000045543. PMID 10644913. S2CID 21203892.
- Sajja LR; Sitaram Reddy B; Sahariah S; Vijay Kumar D. (June 2002). "Giant aneurysm of renal artery: surgical management". Asian Cardiovasc Thorac Ann. 10 (2): 176–177. doi:10.1177/021849230201000222. PMID 12079949. S2CID 9062587.
- Krishnan A; Sahariah SU; Kapoor SK. (March 2004). "Cost of epilepsy in patients attending a secondary-level hospital in India". Epilepsia. 45 (3): 289–291. doi:10.1111/j.1528-1167.2005.41104.x. PMID 15009233.
- Anand K; Jain S; Paul E; Srivastava A; Sahariah SA; Kapoor SK. (May 2005). "Development of a validated clinical case definition of generalized tonic-clonic seizures for use by community-based health care providers". Epilepsia. 46 (5): 743–750. doi:10.1111/j.1528-1167.2005.41104.x. PMID 15857442.
- Sahariah S; Sharma AK; Mittal VK; Yadav RV. (April 1978). "Mycetoma of lower extremity". J Postgrad Med. 24 (2): 113–116. PMID 722604.
- Chugh KS; Singhal PC; Yadav RV; Tewari SC; Nath IV; Kaul RK; Sahariah S. (January 1979). "Ocular complications amongst renal transplant patients". J Assoc Physicians India. 27 (1): 27–31. PMID 389920.
- Mittal VK; Sahariah S; Yadav RV. (July 1980). "Jaundice and hydatid disease of the liver". Am J Proctol Gastroenterol Colon Rectal Surg. 31 (7): 17–18, 30. PMID 7435546.
- Kiran AL; Vijayalakshmi V; Murthy KJ; Sahariah S. (August 1996). "Crossmatching considerations in renal transplantation". J Assoc Physicians India. 44 (8): 521–524. PMID 9251421.
- Mittal VK; Dhaliwal R; Yadav RV; Sahariah S. (August 1976). "Fatal respiratory obstruction due to round worm". Med J Aust. 2 (6): 210–212. doi:10.5694/j.1326-5377.1976.tb130111.x. PMID 979851. S2CID 30004150.
- Yadav RV; Sahariah S; Mittal VK; Banerjee AK. (September 1976). "Angiosarcoma of the male breast". Int Surg. 61 (9): 461–464. PMID 987026.
- Sahariah S; Datta BN; Kaushik SP; Sachdeva HS. (December 1976). "High speed pneumatic drill biopsy in palapable lesions of the breast". Indian J Cancer. 13 (4): 306–309. PMID 1022675.
- Sahariah S; Gupta NM. (March 1976). "Stercoraceous perforation of colon: report of a case". Am Surg. 43 (3): 175–176. PMID 842968.
- Sahariah S; Mitra SK; Pathak IC. (January 1975). "Acute intestinal obstruction due to gram seed. Report of a case". Indian J Pediatr. 42 (324): 29–31. doi:10.1007/BF02753614. PMID 1132904. S2CID 27677056.
- Khanna SK; Sahariah S; Mittal VK. (May–June 1975). "Supraclavicular approach for upper dorsal sympathectomy". Vasc Surg. 9 (3): 151–159. doi:10.1177/153857447500900305. PMID 1199425. S2CID 26305372.
- Sahariah S; Gupta NM; Datta BN. (March 1976). "Bilateral malignant tumour of the testis. A case report". Indian J Cancer. 13 (1-3E760611-761022-3): 81–83. PMID 965029.
- Sahariah S; Khanna SK; Gupta NM; Mittal VK; Kaushik SP. (April 1976). "Obstructed paraduodenal hernia in adults". J Indian Med Assoc. 66 (8): 184–186. PMID 965756.
