= Pt. Jawaharlal Nehru Memorial Medical College =

Medical college and hospital in Chhattisgarh, India

Coordinates: 21.249251°N 81.641039°E

Pt. Jawahar Lal Nehru Memorial Medical College
- Motto: सेवा साधना त्याग
- Motto in English: Service Practice Sacrifice
- Type: Government
- Established: 1963
- Affiliations: Pt. Deendayal Upadhyay Memorial Health Sciences and Ayush University of Chhattisgarh
- Dean: Dr. Tripti Nagaria
- Undergraduates: 230 per batch
- Postgraduates: 130
- Location: Raipur, Chhattisgarh, India
- Campus: Urban
- Website: http://www.ptjnmcraipur.in/

Pt. Jawahar Lal Nehru Memorial Medical College is a government medical college and hospital in Raipur, Chhattisgarh, India. It was founded on 9 September 1963, and recognised by the Medical Council of India in 1969.The college is one of the oldest institutions in state of Chhattisgarh. The B.R. Ambedkar Memorial Hospital established in 1995 in the college campus is the affiliated teaching hospital. The radiotherapy department of this medical college is a government approved Regional Cancer Centre.

== Hospital ==
The college is associated and attached with the Dr. B.R. Ambedkar Memorial Hospital located in Moudhapara, Raipur, and it is 1340-bedded health-care hospital.

== Notable alumni ==
- Alka Kriplani, gynecologist
