= Jagat Ram =

Indian ophthalmologist

- Born: Pabiana village, Sirmaur district, Himachal Pradesh
- Education: Indira Gandhi Medical College affiliated to Himachal Pradesh University
- Occupation: ophthalmologist
- Awards: Padma Shri
- Website: PGIMER Director

Jagat Ram is an ophthalmologist and former director of Postgraduate Institute of Medical Education and Research (PGIMER) Chandigarh, India.

== Early life ==
Jagat Ram was born in family of humble background at Pabiana village in Sirmaur district, Himachal Pradesh. He used to walk daily for a distance of about 10 km to reach his high school in Rajgarh. He completed MBBS from Indira Gandhi Medical College, Shimla, affiliated to Himachal Pradesh University in 1978 and later completed residency in MS in Ophthalmology from PGIMER in June 1982.

== Career ==
Ram was head of department of ophthalmology at PGIMER. In 2015, he received the Oscar of Paediatric Ophthalmology at the World Congress of Paediatric Ophthalmology and Strabismus in Barcelona. He assumed office of Director at PGIMER in March 2017 when he had 24 awards to his credit. He was conferred Padma Shri award by the President of India in January 2019. In 2019, he completed 40 years in PGIMER.
