= Rashtra Sant Tukdoji Regional Cancer Hospital & Research Centre =

Indian research centre and hospital

Coordinates: 21°7′25.50198″N 79°6′16.4421″E

Rashtra Sant Tukdoji Regional Cancer Hospital & Research Centre (RSTRCH) is a state-owned cancer care hospital and research centre in Nagpur, Maharashtra. It was founded on 10 March 1974 as Rashtra Sant Tukdoji Cancer Hospital. It was approved as a Regional Cancer Centre in 1999.
