= K. K. Talwar =

Indian cardiologist and academic

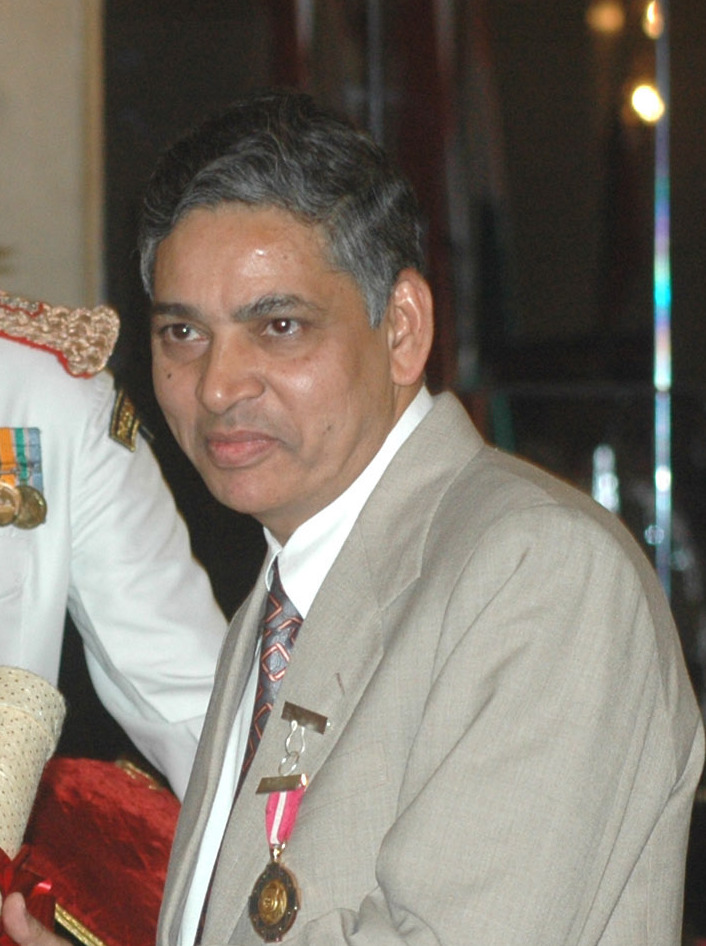
- Dr. K. K. Talwar receiving Padma Bhushan award.
- Born: 30 April 1946 (age 80); Payal, Punjab, British India
- Occupations: Cardiologist; Medical academic
- Years active: Since 1977
- Known for: Electrophysiology; Heart transplant
- Awards: Padma Bhushan; B. C. Roy Award; ICMR Basanti Devi Amir Chand Award; NAMS Ayrabhat award Norman Alpert Award; Ranbaxy Research Award; Goyal Prize; ICMR Amrut Mody Unichem Award; Sujoy B. Roy Memorial Investigator Award; NAMS Shyam Lal Saksena Award; Searle Award

Kewal Kishan Talwar (born 30 April 1946) is an Indian cardiologist, medical academic and writer, and a former chairman of the Medical Council of India. He is a former director of the Post Graduate Institute of Medical Education and Research (PGIMER) and is reported to have performed the first implantation of Implantable cardioverter-defibrillator (ICD) therapy in South Asia. He is also credited with the introduction of Cardiac Resynchronization Therapy in India. He is a recipient of several honours including B. C. Roy Award, the highest Indian award in the medical category. The Government of India awarded him the third highest civilian honour of the Padma Bhushan, in 2006, for his contributions to medicine. Presently Dr. Talwar is working in PSRI Hospital Sheikh Sarai, New Delhi as the chairman of Cardiac Sciences

== Biography ==
Talwar, born on 30 April 1946 at Payal, a small town in Ludhiana district in the north Indian state of Punjab, did his early education in his home town and the neighboring city of Jalandhar and graduated in medicine (MBBS) from Punjabi University, Patiala in 1969. He continued his studies at Postgraduate Institute of Medical Education and Research (PGIMER), Chandigarh from where secured his MD in general medicine in 1973 and DM in cardiology in 1976 and underwent training in Electrophysiology at the University of Gothenburg as a senior research fellow of the World Health Organization. His career started at his alma mater, PGIMER, in December 1977, as a member of faculty where he worked for three years before moving to the All India Institute of Medical Sciences (AIIMS), Delhi, as an assistant professor of cardiology in 1980. During the next twenty four years he worked at AIIMS, he became the professor in 1992 and the head of the department of cardiology in 2002. After leaving AIIMS in 2004, he returned to PGIMER as the director, professor and head of the department of cardiology and stayed there till his superannuation in 2011. His next move was to Max Healthcare, Delhi in 2013 where he serves as the chairman of the Cardiology department of the institution.

Talwar is associated with several government initiatives and is a member of Punjab Governance Reforms Commission (PGRC) and its Task Group on Health and Medical Education. He is a former chairman of the Medical Council of India and the incumbent chair of the Board of Governors of the National Institute of Technical Teachers’ Training and Research, Chandigarh (NITTTR). He also chairs the Board of Governors of the Indian Institute of Science Education and Research, Mohali (IISER) and is an adviser to the Government of Punjab on Health and Medical Education as well as a Visitor Nominee to Banaras Hindu University. He is a former president of the Heart Failure Society of India (2009–2012) and the National Academy of Medical Sciences (2009–2012). He has served as the president of the Indian Heart Rhythm Society and is the patron of the society.

== Legacy ==
After introducing the endomyocardial biopsy (EMB) procedure at AIIMS in 1986, he deployed the technique in the evaluation and diagnosis of tropical heart muscle diseases, and his findings on the occurrence of inflammatory myocarditis in Takayasu's arteritis patients have been documented, the first instance the topic was published in medical literature. He also proposed therapeutical protocol for reversing the myocardial dysfunction using immunosuppressants. He established radiofrequency ablation facility in 1992 at AIIMS as a therapeutic procedure for remedying Cardiac arrhythmia and three years later, he introduced Implantable cardioverter-defibrillator implantation procedure in 1995, the first time the procedure was performed in South Asia. The effort earned him a mention in the 1997 edition of the Limca Book of Records. In 2000, he brought the Cardiac Resynchronization Therapy to India for the first time. The introduction of multisite pacing system for managing heart failure and pioneering efforts in electrophysiology and cardiac pacemakers are some of his other notable contributions. His work on Cardiac arrhythmia helped develop it as a specialty in India and he was associated with Heart transplant program at AIIMS. His work has been documented by way of several publications which include 240 articles and 270 abstracts, published in various peer-reviewed medical journals. He has also contributed 15 chapters to various medical texts.

== Awards and honours ==
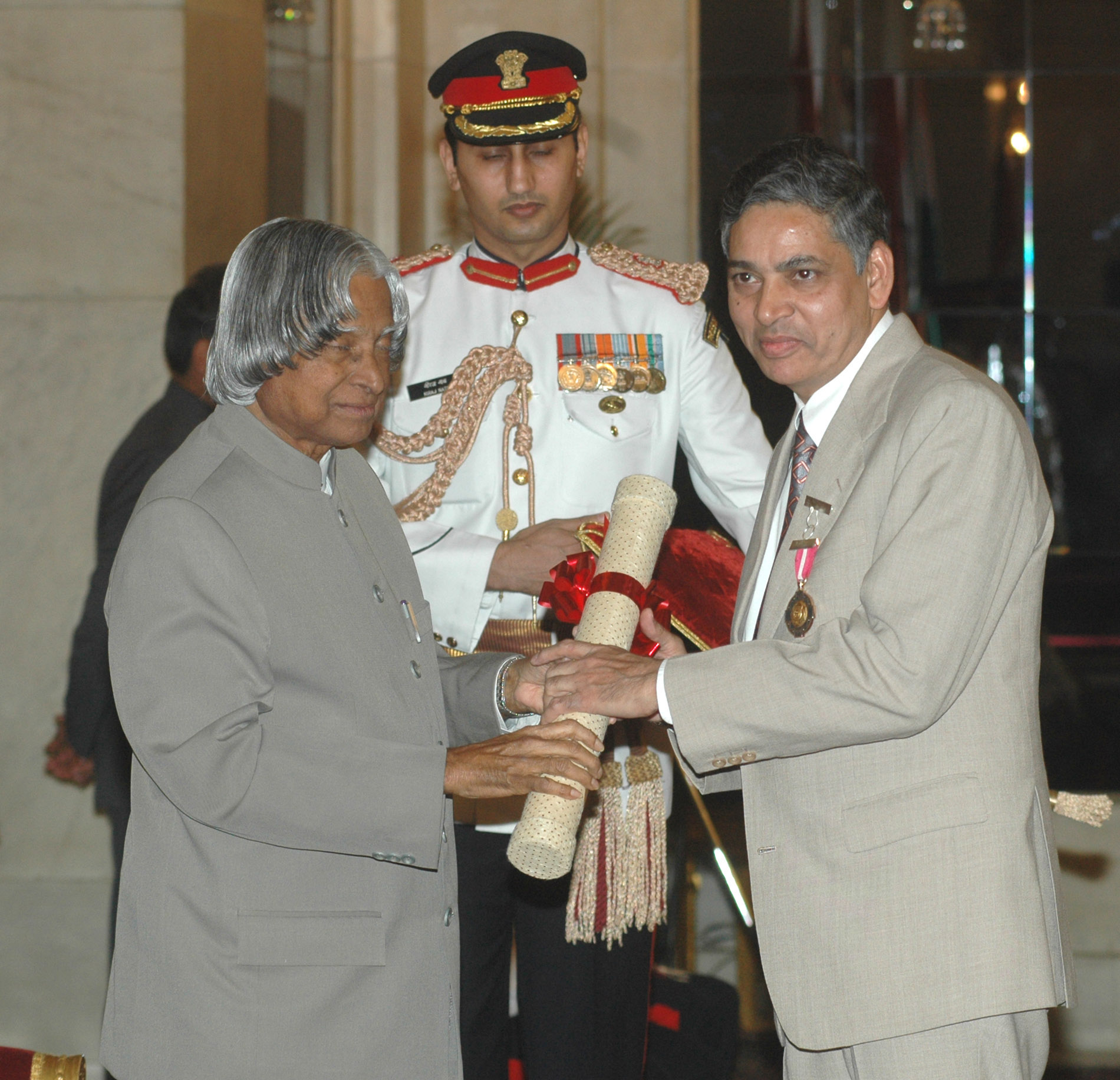
The President, Dr. A.P.J. Abdul Kalam presenting the Padma Bhushan Award – 2006 to Cardiology Specialist Dr. Kewal Krishan Talwar, in New Delhi on 20 March 2006

The researches during his early years at AIIMS earned Talwar the Prof. Sujoy B. Roy Memorial Investigator Award of the Cardiological Society of India in 1986. This was followed by Searle Award, again from the Cardiological Society of India the next year and Shyamlal Saksena Award From the National Academy of Medical Sciences in 1988. The Indian Council of Medical Research awarded him the Amrut Mody Unichem Award in 1993 and the Ranbaxy Research Award reached him in 1997. He received the highest Indian medical award, B. C. Roy Award in 2000, for his services to medical education before receiving awards such as Goyal Prize for Science of Kurukshetra University in 2002 and Basanti Devi Amir Chand Award of the Indian Council of Medical Research in 2003. The International Academy of Cardiovascular Sciences awarded him their Norman Alpert Award for Established Investigators in Cardiovascular Sciences to him in 2005 and the Government of India included him in the Republic Day Honours list of 2006 for the civilian honour of the Padma Bhushan. The National Academy of Medical Sciences honoured him again in 2012 with Aryabhat Award.

Talwar, an Emeritus Professor of the National Academy of Medical Sciences, is an elected fellow of NAMS (1993) and the Indian National Science Academy (2005). He is also a fellow of the American College of Cardiology and the International Academy of Cardiovascular Sciences. Dr. NTR University of Health Sciences had conferred the honoris causa degree of Doctor of Science (DSc) on him. Besides, he has delivered several award orations; Dr. K. L. Wig Oration of NAMS (2000-2001), Dr. Menda Oration of Indian Medical Association (2005), Sphere Oration of Cardiological Society of India (1989), Glaxo Oration of NAMS (1996), Dr. Austin Doyle Memorial Lecture (1996), Dr. Devi Chand Memorial Oration (1992), R. S. Tiwari Oration (1999), Dr. R. N. Chatterjee Memorial Oration (2003), Prof. Raman Vishwanath – VPCI Oration (2007), Prof. P. S. Bidwai Memorial Oration (2007), Kuwait Medical Association Oration (2007), Dr. Ivan Pinto Oration (2008), Dr. J. P. Das Heart Failure Annual Oration (2009), P. L. Wahi Oration (2010), First Innova Foundation Oration (2012), 5th annual Cardiology Chair Oration of Sri Venkateswara Institute of Medical Sciences (2013), and Dr. G.N.Sen Oration (2013) are some of the notable ones.

== See also ==
- Implantable cardioverter-defibrillator
- Cardiac Resynchronization Therapy
