= Indian states ranking by institutional delivery =

This is a list of the States of India ranked in order of percentage of children delivered in hospital. This information was gathered from Union Health Ministry releases NFHS-5 Phase II Findings. Tamil Nadu and Puducherry has the highest institutional delivery percentage with 100% and Nagaland has the lowest in 32.8%.

== List ==
Rank	States	Institutional delivery (%)
1	Tamil Nadu	100
2	Kerala	99.8
3	Goa	96.9
4	Sikkim	94.7
5	Karnataka	94
6	Andhra Pradesh	91.5
7	Telangana	91.5
8	Punjab	90.5
9	Maharashtra	90.3
10	Gujarat	88.5
11	Jammu and Kashmir	85.6
12	Odisha	85.3
13	Rajasthan	84.0
14	Madhya Pradesh	80.8
15	Haryana	80.4
16	Mizoram	79.7
17	Tripura	79.9
18	Himachal Pradesh	76.4
19	West Bengal	75.2
20	Assam	70.6
21	Chhattisgarh	91.6
22	Manipur	69.1
23	Uttarakhand	68.6
24	Uttar Pradesh	67.8
25	Bihar	63.8
26	Jharkhand	61.9
27	Arunachal Pradesh	52.2
28	Meghalaya	51.4
29	Nagaland	32.8
U/T	Puducherry	100
U/T	Lakshadweep	99.3
U/T	Andaman and Nicobar Islands	96.4
U/T	Chandigarh	91.6
U/T	Daman and Diu	90.1
U/T	Dadra and Nagar Haveli	88
U/T	Delhi	84.4
