= Clinica Chimica Acta =

Medicinal chemistry journal

- Discipline: Clinical chemistry, laboratory medicine
- Language: English
- Edited by: J. Delanghe, A.H.B. Wu

Publication details
- History: 1956-present
- Publisher: Elsevier
- Frequency: Monthly
- Impact factor: 6.314 (2021)

Standard abbreviations
- ISO 4: Clin. Chim. Acta

Indexing
- CODEN: CCATAR
- ISSN: 0009-8981 (print); 1873-3492 (web)
- LCCN: 59065012
- OCLC no.: 02259463

Links
- Journal homepage; Online access

Clinica Chimica Acta, is a peer-reviewed medical journal covering clinical chemistry and laboratory medicine. It is the official journal of the International Federation of Clinical Chemistry and Laboratory Medicine.

== Abstracting and indexing ==
This journal is abstracted and indexed in BIOSIS, Chemical Abstracts, Clinical Chemistry Lookout, Current Clinical Chemistry, Current Contents/Life Sciences, EMBASE, EMBiology, FRANCIS, Index Chemica, Informedicus, MEDLINE, PASCAL, Reference Update, and Scopus.
