= Cachar Cancer Hospital and Research Centre =

Cancer hospital in Cachar district of Assam, India

Cachar Cancer Hospital and Research Centre (CCHRC)
- Cachar Cancer Hospital Society

Geography
- Location: Silchar, Cachar District, Assam, Northeast India, Barak Valley, India

Organisation
- Type: Non-profit cancer-care organisation

Services
- Beds: 141

History
- Founded: 1996

Links
- Website: cacharcancerhospital.org
- Lists: Hospitals in India

Cachar Cancer Hospital and Research Centre (CCHRC) is a non-profit oncology hospital and research institute located in Meherpur, near Silchar, in the Cachar district of Assam, India.

== History ==
In the early 1990s, rising cancer cases in southern Assam highlighted the absence of a regional oncology facility. At that time, patients were often required to travel to Guwahati or other distant cities for treatment. To address this gap, the Cachar Cancer Hospital Society was established in 1992. In 1996, the Government of Assam allocated land in Meherpur for the construction of a cancer hospital, and the foundation stone was laid by Chief Minister Hiteswar Saikia. The institution was established in 1996 by the Cachar Cancer Hospital Society, a public charitable society formed in 1992. It provides cancer diagnosis, treatment, prevention, and palliative care, with a focus on patients from rural and economically disadvantaged backgrounds in Northeast India.

The hospital began as a 20-bed facility offering limited diagnostic and treatment services. In 2007, Dr. Ravi Kannan, a surgical oncologist from Chennai, was appointed director. The hospital had 450 employees and 146 inpatient beds by 2024.

== Facilities ==
CCHRC provides surgical oncology, medical oncology, paediatric oncology, and radiation oncology services. It is equipped with diagnostic imaging, pathology and microbiology laboratories, and a molecular oncology unit. The hospital also has a blood bank, dental surgery unit for oral cancer, and a pharmacy that provides free or subsidised medicines, partly through the National Cancer Grid.

In 2024, the Chief Minister of Assam, Himanta Biswa Sarma, inaugurated a positron emission tomography–computed tomography (PET-CT) scanner at the hospital, the first such facility in the Barak Valley region.

== Research and training ==
The hospital participates in multi-centre cancer research projects and conducts training programmes for healthcare workers. It also develops cost-effective treatment approaches intended to address resource constraints in rural healthcare settings.

== Catchment area ==
The hospital primarily serves the Barak Valley region and adjoining states, covering a population of approximately 10 million people.
