= All India Institute of Medical Sciences, Bilaspur =

Public medical college and hospital in Bilaspur, India

- Motto: sarve santu niramaya
- Type: Public
- Established: 2020; 6 years ago
- President: Dr. Narendra Kumar Arora
- Director: Lt. Gen. (Dr.) Daljit Singh, AVSM, VSM (Retd.)
- Students: 398
- Undergraduates: 300
- Location: Bilaspur, Himachal Pradesh, India
- Website: www.aiimsbilaspur.edu.in

All India Institute of Medical Sciences, Bilaspur (AIIMS Bilaspur) is an Indian public medical school, hospital and an Institute of National importance in Bilaspur, Himachal Pradesh, India. It is one of the All India Institutes of Medical Sciences (AIIMSs). Prime Minister Narendra Modi laid the foundation stone of the institute in October 2017, and was subsequently inaugurated in October 2022.

== Academics ==
The institute became operational with the first batch of 50 MBBS students, one of the four AIIMSs to become operational in academic year 2020–21. PGIMER Chandigarh is the mentor institute of AIIMS Bilaspur.

Lt Gen Daljit Singh (Rtd) serves as Executive Director.

== See also ==
- All India Institute of Medical Sciences, Guwahati
