= All India Institute of Medical Sciences, Bathinda =

Medical College and Hospital in Bathinda, Punjab

All India Institute of Medical Sciences Bathinda
- Motto: Sharīramādyam khalu dharmasādhanam (Sanskrit)
- Motto in English: "The body is indeed the primary instrument of dharma."
- Type: Public
- Established: 2019; 7 years ago
- President: Dr. Neerja Bhatla
- Director: Dr. Ratan Gupta
- Location: Bathinda, Punjab, India; 30°9′42.12″N 74°55′34.68″E
- Campus: Urban 177 acres (0.72 km^{2})
- Website: aiimsbathinda.edu.in

All India Institute of Medical Sciences, Bathinda (AIIMS Bathinda) is a medical college and medical research public university based in Bathinda, Punjab, India. As one of the All India Institutes of Medical Sciences, it operates autonomously under the Ministry of Health and Family Welfare. AIIMS Bathinda spreads over a large area of about 177 Acres and is surrounded by lush green parks. It became operational in 2019, one of the six AIIMS to do so in 2019.

== History ==
Stone for AIIMS at Bathinda was laid in November 2016. AIIMS Bathinda was planned as a 750-bedded medical institute on 177 acre land having 10 speciality, 11 super speciality departments and 16 operation theatres. It is planned for 100 seats in medical college and 60 seats in nursing college. It became operational with the first batch of 50 MBBS students, which started in 2019 one of the six AIIMSs to become operational in 2019. The outpatient department (OPD) was inaugurated in December 2019, Postgraduate Institute of Medical Education and Research (PGIMER) was assigned as its mentoring institution in August 2019 and Prof Dinesh Kumar Singh, Former Director of RIMS Ranchi was appointed director in March 2020.

== Campuses ==
The first batch of MBBS of AIIMS Bathinda started at Baba Farid University of Health Sciences (BFUHS), Faridkot campus on a temporary basis as AIIMS campus was under construction on the Bathinda-Dabwali road. Since October 2020 students have been shifted to the AIIMS Bathinda Campus. The Second Batch of 100 students started from December 2020 in the New Campus Itself.

== Academics ==
AIIMS Bathinda was allotted 50 MBBS seats for the first session with 22 seats for general category students, 14 reserved for OBCs, 8 for SCs, 4 reserved for ST students and 2 seats reserved for persons with disabilities (PwD). The seat number has increased to 100 from batch 2020. The institute also offers 60 seats in B.Sc. Nursing. From 2020 session seats are increased for undergraduate courses and now 100 seats are available.
