= National Academy of Medical Sciences =

Indian medical organisation

National Academy of Medical Sciences (India)
- Formation: 21 April 1961; 65 years ago
- Purpose: To foster academic excellence in Medicine
- Headquarters: NAMS House
- Location: Ansari Nagar, New Delhi
- Coordinates: 28.3359°N 77.1312°E
- Region served: India
- President: Dr. Sarin S. K., MD, DM, FAMS
- Honorary Secretary: Dr. Umesh Kapil, MD, FAMS
- Treasurer: Dr. Rani Kumar, MD, FAMS
- Website: Website
- Formerly called: Indian Academy of Medical Sciences

National Academy of Medical Sciences (India), better known by its acronym, NAMS, is a non-constitutional, non-statutory advisory body to the Government in matters related to National Health Policy and Planning and as a promoting agency for continuing medical education (CME) for medical and health professionals. It is a part of the Inter Academy Medical Panel (IAMP), a global network of medical academies. The Academy is headquartered at NAMS House, at Ansari Nagar, neighbouring the AIIMS and the ICMR House, along Mahatma Gandhi Marg, in the Indian capital of New Delhi.

== Genesis ==
The National Academy of Medical Sciences originated as the Indian Academy of Medical Sciences, a registered society, on 21 April 1961, for the promotion of medical education and research in India. The academy, housed in NAMS House, New Delhi, started functioning when Jawaharlal Nehru, the then Prime Minister of India inaugurated the institution on 19 December 1961. In 1963, the inaugural convocation was held at Vigyan Bhavan, New Delhi when Sarvepalli Radhakrishnan addressed the gathering. The Academy re-branded itself as the National Academy of Medical Sciences (India) on 16 November 1976.

== Governance ==
The Academy is governed by a council that is made up of 22 Indian medical professionals who are selected from the community. It is headed by a President and Vice President, and a Treasurer assists them in financial matters. Mukund S. Joshi is the incumbent president and Sanjay Wadhwa and Manorama Berry serves as the vice president and treasurer, respectively. The council members include many notable medical personalities such as P. K. Dave, Saroj Chooramani Gopal and Mohan Kameswaran, among others.

== Activities ==
One of the principal activities of NAMS is promoting medical education through continuing medical education (CME) programmes for the junior scientists and medical professionals. The Academy provides opportunities, on a regular basis, for the aspirants to undergo training at various centres of excellence. It conducts symposia and workshops on various medical topics where medical professionals and researchers are exposed to modern medical methodologies and practices and encourages them to join the stream as members of the Academy. On successful performance at the entry examination conducted by the National Board of Examinations, the examinees are awarded the Diplomate of National Board title (formerly MNAMS). Besides the academic promotion activities, the Academy recognizes excellence through Fellowships and Awards; the fellowship further categorized into Honorary Fellows and elected Fellows. Honorary Fellowship is awarded to eminent personalities while elected fellowship is limited to medical professionals. An annual conference is conducted by the Academy, NAMSCON, which is a major event in the Indian medical calendar. Further, it acts as an advisory body to the Government of India in matters related to National Health Policy and Planning.

== Emeritus Professors ==
The academy honors academics with notable service profile and achievements with the title of Emeritus Professor. The following is a list of Emeritus Professor title holders:

- Daya Kishore Hazra
- Jasbir Singh Bajaj
- M. Berry
- Shivinder Singh Gill
- M. K. Bahn
- C. S. Bhaskaran
- C. Shyamala Bhasakaran
- R. V. Bhatt
- M. S. Boparai
- Kamal Buckshee
- Ranjit Roy Chaudhury
- Jagjit Singh Chopra
- Kirpal Singh Chugh
- T. D. Chugh
- P. K. Dave
- M. G. Deo
- S. S. Deshmukh
- N. K. Ganguly
- B. K. Goyal
- J. S. Guleria
- O. P. Gupta
- S. Kameswaran
- B. M. L. Kapur
- Narayana Panicker Kochupillai
- Ramachandra Datatraya Lele
- Jitendra Nath Pande
- Sunkara Balaparameswara Rao
- G. S. Sainani
- C. P. Sawhney
- K. N. Sharma
- Shridhar Sharma
- Gurmohan Singh
- K. K. Talwar
- Prakash Narain Tandon
- S. P. S. Teotia
- S. N. Wadhwa
- N. H. Wadia

== Journal of the Academy ==
The Academy publishes a quarterly journal, the Annals of the National Academy of Medical Sciences (India), which provides a platform for researchers, educationists and education administrators to publish their works. Sanjeev Misra is the editor while V. Mohan Kumar and Mohan Kameswaran serve as the Associate Editor and Assistant Editor respectively and they are assisted by an Editorial Board and a team of editorial assistants.

== Awards and Prizes ==
The Academy has instituted six annual awards for contributions in the fields of research, service, publication and academics.

- Dr. S. S. Misra Memorial Award

The award recognizes excellence in research by a student below the age of 40 years and is open to unpublished work in the field of biomedical science. Established in 1974, in honour of one of the founder fellows of the Academy, the award carries a bronze medal and a cash prize.

- Sir Shriram Memorial Award

The award was instituted by an endowment from Shriram Foundation, carrying a bronze medal and cash prize, and is awarded for the best unpublished work on community health and medicine, medical education and hospital administration during a period of three years preceding the award.

- Dr. R. M. Kasliwal Award

Founded by a Fellow of the Academy, the award is open to the best field work on diseases related to colon. The scrutiny is based on a submitted paper by the aspirant on the work done by him in India.

- Dr. Vimla Yirmani Award

This is another award founded by a fellow of the Academy, which recognizes the work done in India in the field of physical and or psycho-sociological rehabilitation of neurologically and or mentally afflicted people. The award consists of a bronze medal and cash prize.

- Shriram Travel Fellowship Scheme

This is a fellowship open to the faculty of an Indian educational institution for advanced learning at another Indian institution. The fellowship is awarded on the basis of nominations received from the heads of institutions in India.

- Shyam Lal Saxena Memorial Award

Awarded to the best work, published or unpublished, by a researcher, in the field of biomedical engineering and carries a bronze medal and cash prize.

Besides these awards, two annual orations NAMS Oration and Dr. K. L. Wig Oration, have also been instituted by the Academy.

== See also ==
- Indian National Science Academy
- Indian Academy of Sciences
- National Academy of Sciences, India
