= Regional Cancer Centres =

Cancer hospitals and institutes in India

Regional Cancer Centres (RCCs) are cancer care hospitals and research institutes operating in India under the joint control and funding of the Government of India and the respective state governments. The name 'regional' because each of these institutions cater to a designated region, usually a number of districts in the country. There are presently 62 such centres spanning all the states and union territories of India. This system works under the National Cancer Control Programme which started in 1975 under the Ministry of Health and Family Welfare (India). The scheme originally started with 5 RCCs for 5 designated regions of the nation. Later this number was increased in steps. The Tata Memorial Centre at Mumbai is the oldest and the most comprehensive amongst these centres. Similar to these are the 72 NCI-designated Cancer Centers in the US.

== List of Regional Cancer Centres ==
Regional Cancer Centres, presently approved and funded by the central government are:

List of Regional Cancer Centres
Regional Cancer Centre	City	State
Acharya Harihar Post Graduate Institute of Cancer	Cuttack	Odisha
Acharya Tulsi Regional Cancer Trust & Research Institute	Bikaner	Rajasthan
ACTREC	New Mumbai	Maharashtra
All India Institute of Medical Sciences	New Delhi	Delhi
Anna Memorial Cancer Research Institute	Kancheepuram	Tamil Nadu
All India Institute of Medical Sciences	Bhubaneshwar	Odisha
Amrita Institute of Medical Sciences and Research Institute	Kochi	Kerala
Army Medical Corps of Indian Army	New Delhi	Delhi
Arunachal State Hospital	Naharlagun	Arunachal Pradesh
Aster Medcity	Kochi	Kerala
Basavatarakam Indo American Cancer Institute & Research Centre	Hyderabad	Telangana
Cachar Cancer Hospital and Research Centre	Silchar	Assam
Cancer Hospital & Research Centre	Gwalior	Madhya Pradesh
Cancer Institute (WIA)	Chennai	Tamil Nadu
Cancer Research and Relief Trust	Chennai	Tamil Nadu
Chittaranjan National Cancer Institute	Kolkata	West Bengal
Christian Medical College	Vellore	Tamil Nadu
Civil Hospital - Agartala	Agartala	Tripura
Delhi State Cancer Institutes	New Delhi	Delhi
Dr. B Borooah Cancer Institute	Guwahati	Assam
G. Kuppuswamy Naidu Memorial Hospital	Coimbatore	Tamil Nadu
GBH American Hospital	Udaipur	Rajasthan
Government Medical College - Jammu	Jammu	Jammu
Government Medical College - Nagpur	Nagpur	Maharashtra
Gujarat Cancer & Research Institute	Ahmedabad	Gujarat
HealthCare Global Enterprises- Bangalore	Bangalore	Karnataka
Himalayan Institute Hospital Trust	Dehradun	Uttarakhand
Homi Bhabha Cancer Hospital & Research Centre (TMC)	Visakhapatnam	Andhra Pradesh
Homi Bhabha Cancer Hospital (TMC)	Sangrur	Punjab
Indian Rotary Cancer Institute (AIIMS)	New Delhi	Delhi
Indira Gandhi Institute of Medical Sciences	Patna	Bihar
Indira Gandhi Medical College - RCC	Shimla	Himachal Pradesh
Institute of Cytology & Preventive Oncology	Noida	Uttar Pradesh
Jehangir Hospital - Jehangir Clinical Development Centre	Pune	Maharashtra
Kamala Nehru Memorial Hospital	Allahabad	Uttar Pradesh
Kidwai Memorial Institute of Oncology	Bengaluru	Karnataka
Kolhapur Cancer Center	Kolhapur	Maharashtra
M P Birla Hospital, Priyamvada Birla Cancer Research Institute	Satna	Madhya Pradesh
M S Patel Cancer Centre (Charutar Aroghya Mandal)	Anand	Gujarat
Madras Cancer Care Foundation	Chennai	Tamil Nadu
Majumdar Shaw Cancer Centre	Bangalore	Karnataka
Malabar Cancer Centre	Kannur	Kerala
Max Healthcare Inst. Ltd.	New Delhi	Delhi
Mizoram State Cancer Institute, Aizawl	Aizwal	Mizoram
MNJ Institute of Oncology	Hyderabad	Telangana
Naga Hospital Authority, Kohima (NHAK)	Kohima	Nagaland
Nizam's Institute of Medical Sciences	Hyderabad	Telangana
Oncology Padhar Hospital	Betul	Madhya Pradesh
Pondicherry cancer Care Society JIPMER	Puducherry	Puducherry
Pt. B.D. Sharma PG Inst of Med Sci	Rohtak	Haryana
R S T Cancer Hospital & Research Centre	Nagpur	Maharashtra
R&R Hospital (Armed Forces)	New Delhi	Delhi
Regional Cancer Centre	Thiruvananthapuram	Kerala
Regional Institute of Medical Sciences	Imphal	Manipur
Sanchetee hospital	Jodhpur	Rajasthan
Sanjay Gandhi PGI of Medical Sciences	Lucknow	Uttar Pradesh
Sher-I-Kashmir Institute of Medical Sciences	Srinagar	Jammu & Kashmir
SMS Medical College	Jaipur	Rajasthan
St. John's NAMS	Bangalore	Karnataka
State Cancer Society of Meghalaya	Shillong	Meghalaya
Tata Medical Centre	Kolkata	West Bengal
