= Postgraduate Institute of Medical Education and Research =

Medical research institution in Chandigarh, India

- Other name: PGIMER
- Motto: ārta sevā sarva bhadra: śodhaśa ca
- Motto in English: Service to the Community, Care of the Needy and Research for the Good of All
- Type: Public Medical University
- Established: 1962; 64 years ago
- Budget: ₹2,504.65 crore (US$260 million)(2026)
- President: Union Minister of Health and Family Welfare
- Director: Dr. Vivek Lal
- Faculty: 650
- Students: 712 (not including students who were admitted in 2020-2021)
- Postgraduates: 302 (not including students who were admitted in 2020-2021)
- Doctoral students: 410 (not including students who were admitted in 2020-2021)
- Location: Chandigarh, India; 30°45′58″N 76°46′31″E
- Campus: 277 acres (112 ha); Urban
- Newspaper: Journal of Postgraduate Medicine, Education and Research
- Website: www.pgimer.edu.in

Postgraduate Institute of Medical Education and Research (PGIMER) is a premier medical school in Chandigarh, India. An 'Institute of National Importance', it has educational, research, and training facilities for its students including all specialties, super specialties and sub specialties. It is the leading tertiary care hospital of the northern India region and caters to patients from all over Punjab, Jammu and Kashmir, Himachal Pradesh, Uttarakhand, Haryana, Bihar and Uttar Pradesh. Apart from the clinical services, PGI also provides training in almost all disciplines of medicine including post graduate and post doctoral degrees, diplomas, Doctor of Philosophy and fellowships. There are more than 50 such training courses in the institute. The 100-seat MBBS college is expected to start by 2025 at PGI's satellite centre.

== History ==
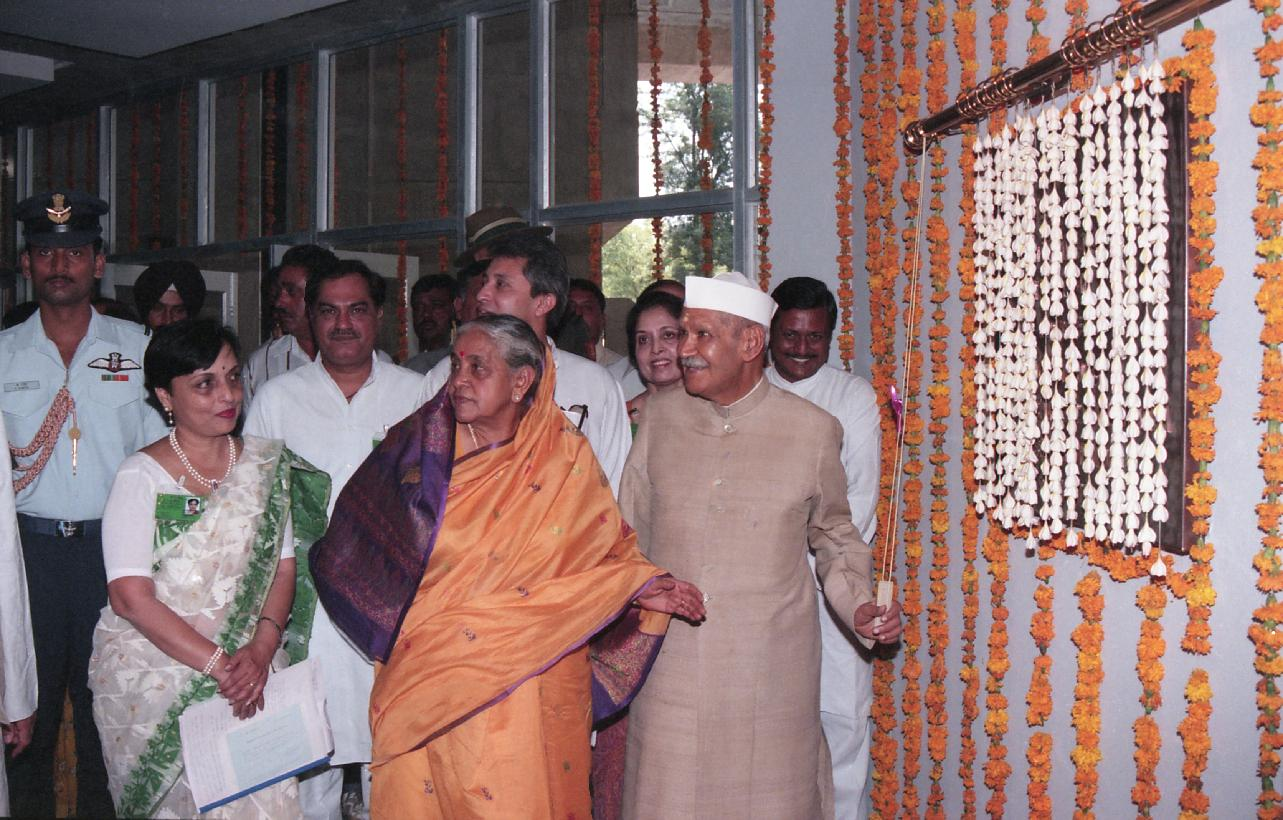
The President of India, Dr. Shankar Dayal Sharma unveiling the plaque to inaugurate the Advanced Paediatric Centre in the Post Graduate Institute of Medical Education and Research, at Chandigarh

The founders of the institute are Tulsi Das, Santokh Singh Anand, Pran Nath Chuttani, B N Aikat, Sant Ram Dhall and Bala Krishna.

The institute was established in 1962 under the erstwhile state of Punjab. It was declared as an Institute of National Importance by an Act of Parliament (Sr. No. 51 of 1966) w.e.f. 1 April 1967.

== Teaching and training ==
PGIMER is involved in research for the urban and community related environment and health problems. The focus of research has been on tackling diseases like diarrhea, tuberculosis, malaria, amoebiasis, systemic vasculitis, relapsing polychondritis, HIV, leprosy, hepatitis, anaemia, leukaemia, hypertension, atherosclerosis, thalassemia, dental caries, oral cancer, stone disease, cancer, and sexually transmitted infections.

Techniques are available to conduct studies like flow cytometry, chromatography (HPLC, FPLC), molecular biology, positron emission tomography and genetic studies. A BSL-III laboratory for mycobacteria is under construction. Recently, some highly advanced bio techniques like ultracentrifugation, LC-MS, scanning electron microscopy and whole genome sequencer have been installed in the CSIC, research block B.

== Admission process ==
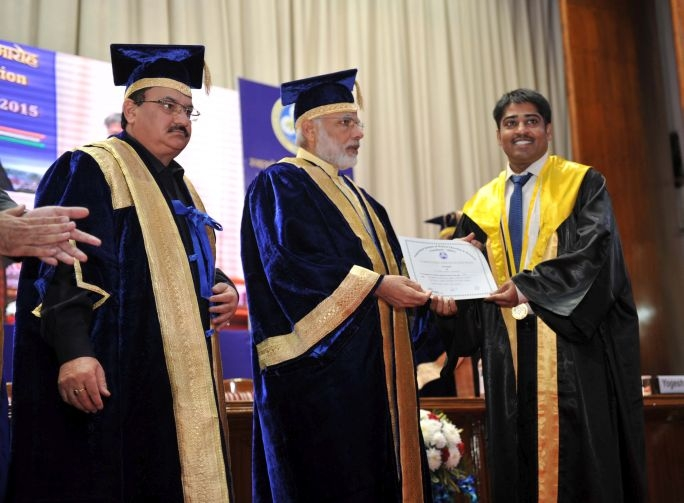
Prime Minister Narendra Modi and Union Health Minister J.P. Nadda at the 34th Convocation of PGIMER in 2015.

Admission to post doctoral and postgraduate courses conducted at PGIMER is made twice a year. The sessions commence from first January and first July. The admission to the courses is made on merit on all-India basis by holding an entrance examination by the institute, after issuing a countrywide admission notice. Each year, more than 20,000 medical graduates across the country compete for the positions. Approximately 1% to 2% of the candidates are selected, making it one of the most competitive tests across all fields in India. PGIMER also trains nurses and paramedical students for under and post graduation every year.

== Academics ==
The institute provides post-graduation in subject including.

- Doctor of Philosophy (PhD): PhD is available for many subjects and is notified in the prospectus each year.
- Doctor of Medicine (MD): MD is a clinical doctorate degree of 3 years and is available in almost all non-surgical streams of medicine. Prerequisite for super-specialty post doctoral 'DM' degree is MD in that particular subject.
- Master of Surgery (MS): MS is also a clinical doctorate degree of 3 years, but in surgical fields. Prerequisite for super speciality post doctoral 'MCh' degree is MS.
- Master of Dental Surgery (MDS): This is the equivalent of MD/MS and meant for dental studies, such as orthodontics, pediatric dentistry, preventive dentistry and oral & maxillofacial surgery.
- Hospital Administration (MD): Education in hospital administration is equivalent to MBA and trains students to become hospital administrators using the modern methods of business administration.
- Masters in Public Health (MPH): This two-year course provides competency in public health management, teaching, research and leadership. After taking a core course and an elective course in the first year, candidates take a special paper on epidemiology or health management or health promotion in the second year. Graduates of medicine (MBBS), dental (BDS), veterinary (BVSc), engineering (BE) or any postgraduate degree (MA/M.Sc.) who have passed with at least 50% marks are admitted through a national entrance test.
- Medicine Doctorate (DM): DM is a super-specialty post doctoral degree of 3 years in a medical specialty stream. The prerequisite for DM is a clinical doctorate degree, such as MD. One has to choose a particular branch from the field in which they did MD. For example: after pursuing an MD in general medicine, one can do DM in nephrology, cardiology, endocrinology, etc.
- Master of Surgery (MCh): MCh is a super-specialty post doctoral degree of 3 years in Surgical streams. The prerequisite for MCh is a clinical doctorate degree, such as MS General Surgery. The MCh neurosurgery department is one of the oldest in PGIMER.
- Master of Science (MSc): MSc is a master's degree of 2 years with intense research focus. It is offered by Department of Radiodiagnosis and Imaging, Department of Biochemistry, Department of Exp. Medicine & Biotechnology, Department of Pharmacology, and the Department of Otolaryngology of Speech and Hearing Unit.
- Bachelor of Science (BSc): BSc (paramedical) in PGIMER is an undergraduate degree of 4 years (previously 3 years) with intense research focus in academics and practical knowledge. It is offered by Department of Radiodiagnosis and Imaging, Department of Biochemistry, Department of Ophthalmology, and Department of Radiotherapy.

=== Elective training ===
The institute accepts medical students from other countries for elective training in any of its departments. Clearance from the Ministry of Health and Family Welfare, Government of India and National Medical Commission, New Delhi is required before the students are accepted. The process takes about 3–4 months.

== Dr. Tulsi Das Library ==
Dr. Tulsi Das Library, PGIMER, was established in 1962. It has 45,696 books, 57,610 bound journals and current journals (print/online) include 414 international and 96 national journals. At present the library has 4,851 theses of MD, MS, DM, M.Ch., Ph.D. and M.Sc. from different disciplines. The library subscribes to online databases like Science Direct, MD consult, Wiley-Blackwell, Oxford Journals and 494 online full text journals.

== Satellite center ==
Initially announced in 2013, the PGIMER now has an operational satellite center at Sangrur in Punjab. In August 2017, the INR 495 crore budget for setting up a similar second satellite center at Una, Himachal Pradesh was approved. A third satellite center was approved at Firozpur, Punjab.

== Rankings ==
Life Sciences and Medicine University rankings

Medical – India
- NIRF (2024): 2
- India Today (2024): 2
- Outlook India (2024): 2

PGIMER Chandigarh was ranked second among medical colleges in India by the National Institutional Ranking Framework in 2024. It was also ranked second in India by India Today in 2024 and second among government colleges by Outlook India in 2024.

== Notable alumni ==
- Chandra Mohan Yadav , Radiologist
- Dr Ashok Utreja , Orthodontist
- Ashok Panagariya, Neurologist
- Sarbeswar Sahariah, nephrologist and organ transplant specialist
- Salman Akhtar, Psychoanalytic and author
- Chittoor Mohammed Habeebullah, gastroenterologist
- Purshottam Lal Wahi, cardiologist
- Jasvinder K Gambhir, Indian professor and doctor
- Ram Baran Yadav, first President of Nepal
- Harpinder Singh Chawla, dental surgeon and Padma Shri awardee
- Keiki R. Mehta, ophthalmologist and Padma Shri awardee
- YS Chandrashekhar, Cardiologist
- K. K. Talwar, cardiologist and Padma Bhushan recipient
- P. K. Sasidharan, Researcher, author, social activist, educator
- Jagjit Singh Chopra, neurologist and Padma Bhushan recipient
- T. S. Chandrasekar, gastroenterologist, Padma Shri awardee
- Rakesh Aggarwal, gastroenterologist, National Bioscience Award for Career Development recipient
- Amod Gupta, ophthalmologist, Padma Shri awardee
- Kirpal Singh Chugh, nephrologist, Padma Shri awardee
- Jagat Ram, ophthalmologist and Padma Shri awardee

== Notable faculty ==
- Yogesh Kumar Chawla, hepatologist, director and Padma Shri awardee.
- Jagat Ram

== See also ==
- All India Institute of Medical Sciences, Bathinda is mentored by PGIMER
- Atal Bihari Vajpayee Institute of Medical Sciences and Dr. RML Hospital, New Delhi
- Jawaharlal Institute of Postgraduate Medical Education and Research, Puducherry
- National Institute of Mental Health and Neurosciences, Bengaluru
- Sanjay Gandhi Postgraduate Institute of Medical Sciences, Lucknow
- Indira Gandhi Medical College, Shimla
