= M. Srinivas (surgeon) =

Indian medical professional

Director at AIIMS, Delhi
- In office September 2022 – April 2026
- Preceded by: Dr. Randeep Guleria
- Succeeded by: Dr. Nikhil Tandon

Dean at Employees' State Insurance
- In office 2016–2022

Personal details
- Born: 11 August 1966 (age 60) Yadgir, Karnataka, India
- Education: All India Institute of Medical Sciences, New Delhi (M.Ch); Ballari Medical College and Research Centre (M.B.B.S.)
- Profession: Doctor
- Website: Official website

M. Srinivas (born 11 August 1966) is an Indian medical professional and is currently serving as a full-time member of NITI Aayog, the Government of India's policy think tank from May 2026 onwards. He also served as director of the All India Institute of Medical Sciences (AIIMS) in Delhi from September 2022 till April 2026.

== Early life and education ==
M. Srinivas was raised in Karnataka's Yadgir district, where his father, Ashappa, served as a tehsildar. He attended the Government Model Primary School at Station Bazar, Yadgir, for his early education and later continued his studies at the Government New Kannada Proudha Shaale in the same district. Srinivas completed his pre-university education at a PU College in Yadgir before moving to Bellary for further studies.

He received his MBBS degree at the Ballari Medical College and Research Centre. After completing his MBBS, Srinivas earned PG at JJM Medical College Davangere and even a Master Chirurgiae (MCh) degree from AIIMS, New Delhi.

== Career ==
Srinivas was a professor in the special expert division of the pediatric surgery department at AIIMS, Delhi. In 2016, he assumed the position of Dean at the Employees' State Insurance Corporation (ESIC) Medical College and Hospital, Hyderabad.

In September 2022, Srinivas was appointed as the director of AIIMS, Delhi, by the Appointments Committee of the Cabinet.

== See also ==
- S. Amin Tabish
- Jeremy Farrar
- Adel Mahmoud
