= Till We Win =

2020 book

Till We Win: India's Fight Against the COVID-19 Pandemic
- First edition
- Authors: Chandrakant Lahariya, Randeep Guleria, Gagandeep Kang
- Language: English
- Publisher: Penguin Books
- Publication place: India

Till We Win: India's Fight Against the COVID-19 Pandemic, published by Penguin Books in 2020, is a book on the COVID-19 pandemic in India. It has been coauthored by three leading doctors/scientists and health system experts of India. Co-written by Chandrakant Lahariya, Randeep Guleria, and Gagandeep Kang, this book managed to garner significant critical attention from book reviewers and reputed media across the country.

== Reception ==
Mumbai Mirror wrote: "Dedicated to frontline healthcare workers, the book provides insights into how the pandemic emerged and grew, what was done to combat the virus, what continues to be done, and what the future holds for us. Dr Kang is, of course, one of the country’s leading medical scientist, Dr. Lahariya is a public health practitioner and public policy strategist, who has coordinated the World Health Organization's work in India on new vaccines, and Dr. Guleria is the director of All India Institutes of Medical Sciences."

Ramya Kannan from The Hindu stated that Till We Win is a valiant attempt by three scientists who together wrote a book to provide the much needed clarity about the pandemic. About the book, she further wrote that: "It touches on all key aspects of the crisis, including the nature of viruses, the corona virus family, a timeline, the country’s state of unpreparedness, upgradation of health infrastructure, health systems and funding, treatment protocols that constantly evolved, raises and answers questions about quarantine, safety protocols, vaccines, based on scientific prudence at that point of time, hoping to address the gaps in communication that exist despite the carpet bombing of information on COVID."

The New Indian Express's review of the book stated that: "Overall, the book is for the people, political leaders, policymakers and physicians, with the promise and potential to transform public health and strengthen Indian healthcare system. The book focuses as much about staying safe in the pandemic, providing information on vaccines and therapies."

== See also ==
- Randeep Guleria
- Chandrakant Lahariya
- Gagandeep Kang
- COVID-19 pandemic in India
