= S. Amin Tabish =

Professor and scientist (born 1957)

Syed Amin Tabish
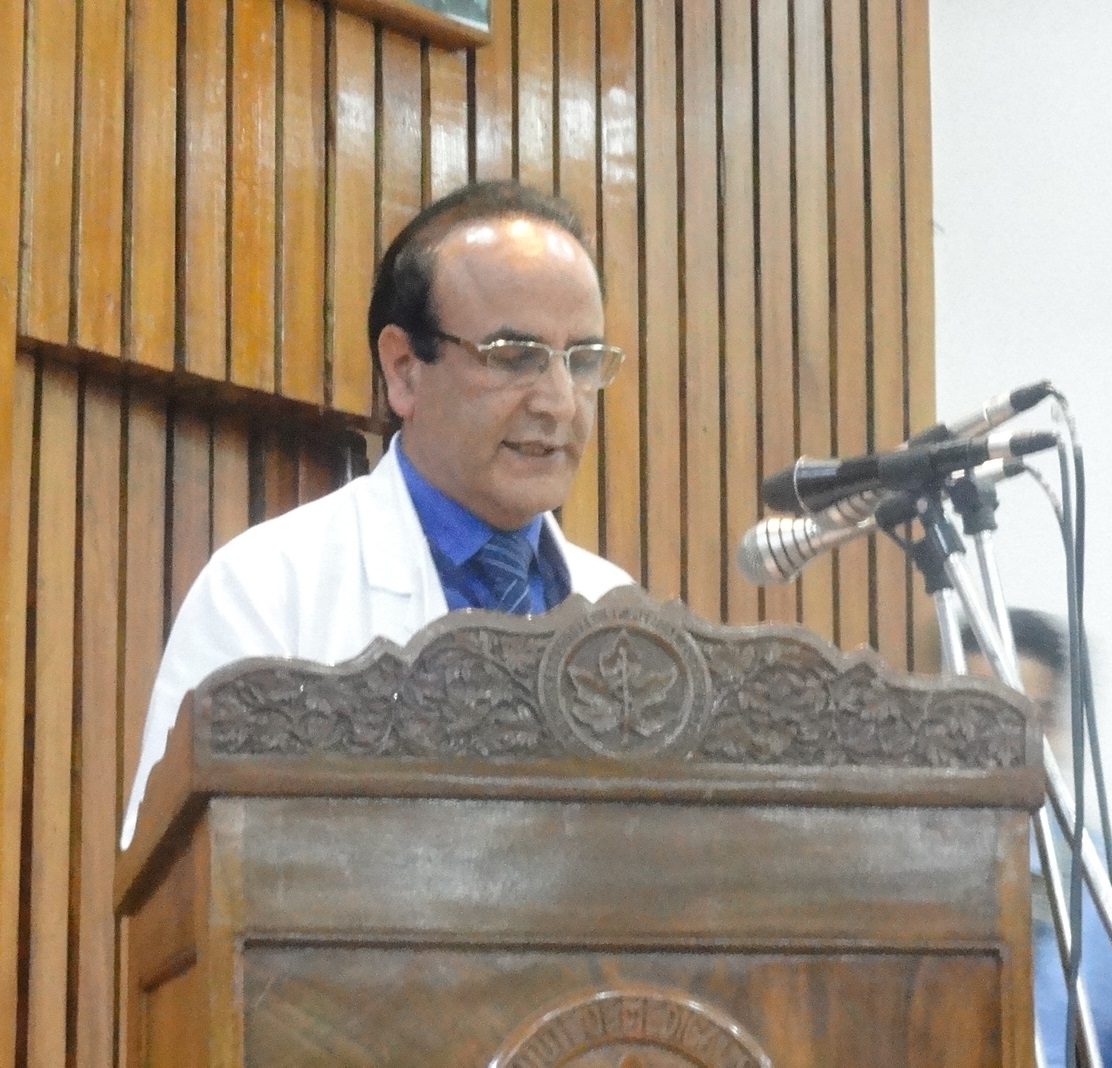
- Syed Amin Tabish delivering a speech
- Born: March 30, 1957 (age 69); Pattan, Baramulla, Jammu and Kashmir, India
- Other name: S.A. Tabish
- Education: Govt Medical College Srinagar; All India Institute of Medical Sciences, New Delhi; University of Bristol (England)
- Occupations: Medical scientist Researcher; Author; Poet
- Employer: SKIMS Hospital Kashmir
- Known for: Health policy Emergency medicine Medical Management; Social science
- Awards: Asian Admirable Achievers Award 2023. Rifacimento International, New Delhi; Dr. APJ Abdul Kalam Award-2018; 7th MT India Healthcare Award 2017; Award of Excellence in Educational Leadership (USA): 2014

Syed Amin Tabish (Urdu:سید امین تابش; born 30 March 1957) is an Indian medical scientist, physician, healthcare administrator, author, and poet.

He is fellow of the Royal College of Physicians of London, the American College of Physicians, and the New York Academy of Science. Tabish earned a postdoctoral fellowship at the University of Bristol's Faculty of Medicine.

Dr Tabish received the 7th MT India Healthcare Award (2017) and the Dr. A. P. J. Abdul Kalam Award in 2018.

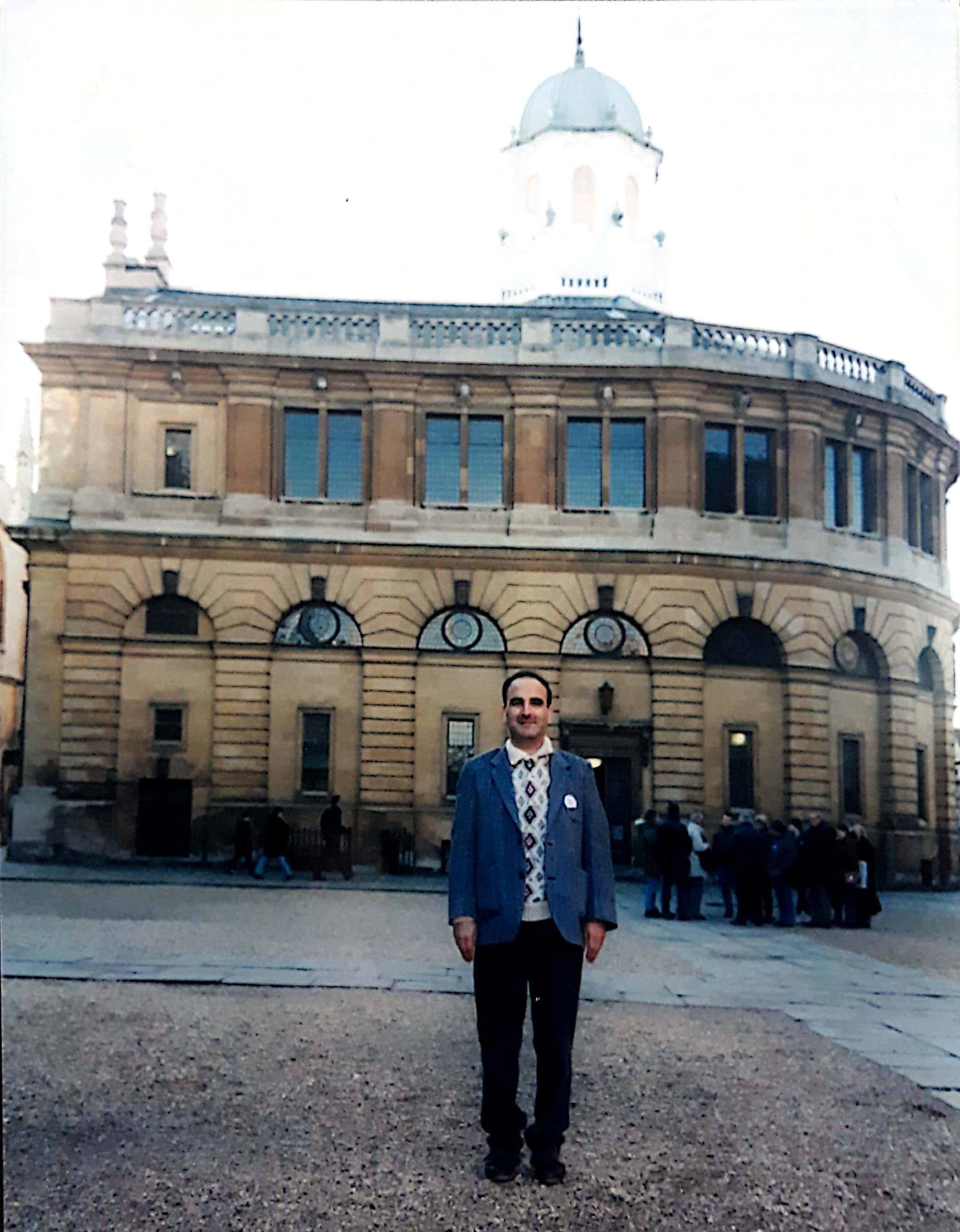
Dr. Tabish at the University of Oxford in 1996 (shortly after delivering a lecture during a conference)

== Early life and education ==
Tabish was born in Tilgam, in the Pattan region of Baramulla district, India. He received his MBBS degree from Government Medical College Srinagar. He obtained his postgraduate degree from All India Institute of Medical Sciences (AIIMS), New Delhi. He later undertook a postdoctoral fellowship in the Faculty of Medicine at the University of Bristol, England.

His professional credentials include fellowships from the Royal College of Physicians of London and Edinburgh, the American College of Physicians, the National Academy of Medical Sciences (India), the International Medical Sciences Academy, and the Royal Institute of Public Health (England). He earned additional academic credentials in health services management (London) and doctorate in educational leadership (USA).

== Career ==
=== Medical and administrative work ===
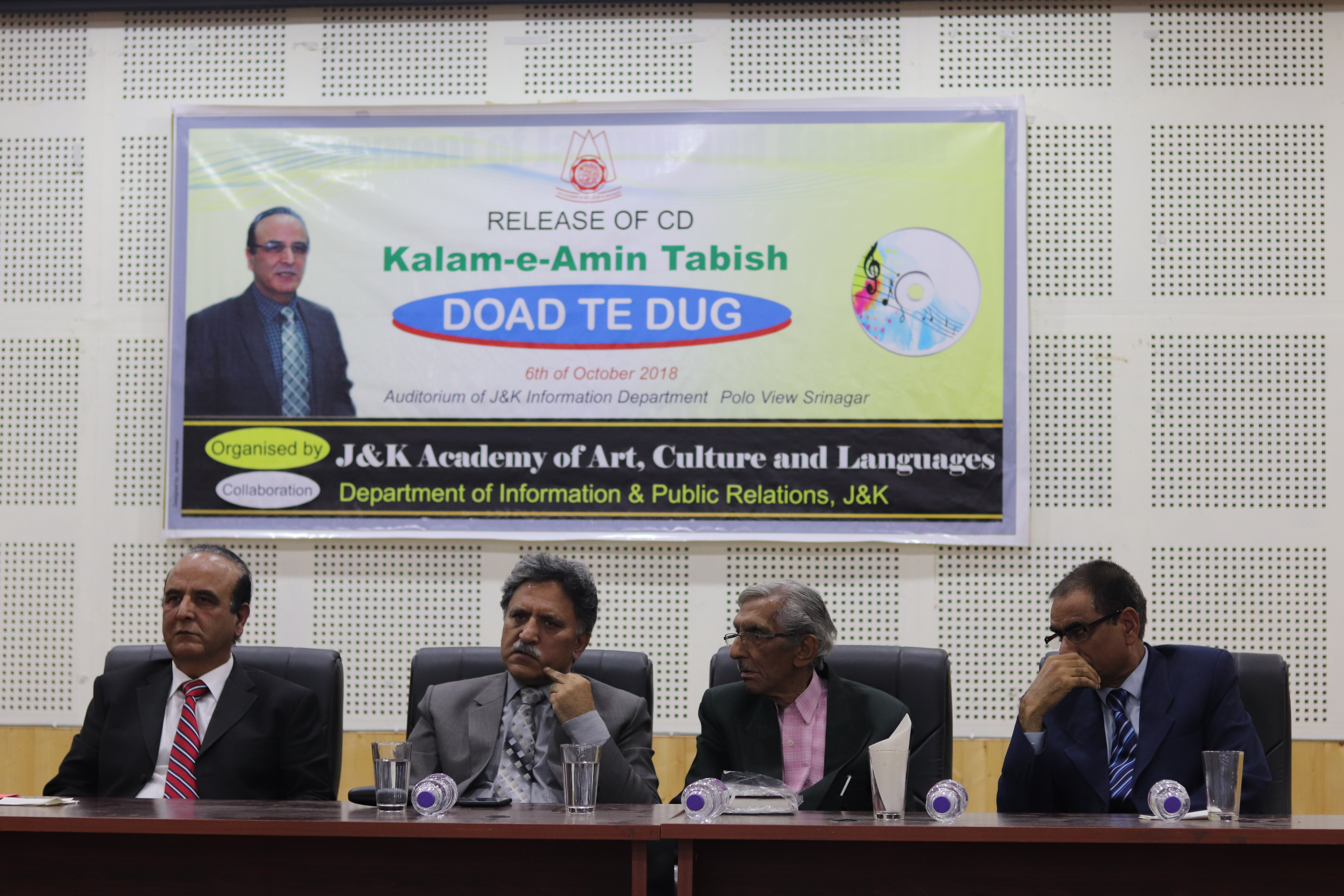
Releasing ceremony of a music CD based on Tabish's lyrics. From left to right: Syed Amin Tabish, Khursheed Ahmad Ganai IAS, Rehman Rahi, and Aziz Hajini.

Tabish joined the Sher-e-Kashmir Institute of Medical Sciences (SKIMS), Srinagar, where he held a series of clinical, academic, and administrative appointments. As head of emergency services between the late 1990s and early 2010s, he oversaw the development of expanded emergency-care facilities and initiated programs related to disaster management, infection control, and quality improvement.

At SKIMS and later at Qassim University in Saudi Arabia, Tabish contributed to curricular development, training programs for clinical staff, and the introduction of structured courses in emergency care, life-support skills, and nursing education. He participated in several institutional initiatives related to medical education, problem-based learning, and hospital management.

In 1998 he represented India at the World Health Forum in Dallas, an international meeting focused on health policy and hospital systems.

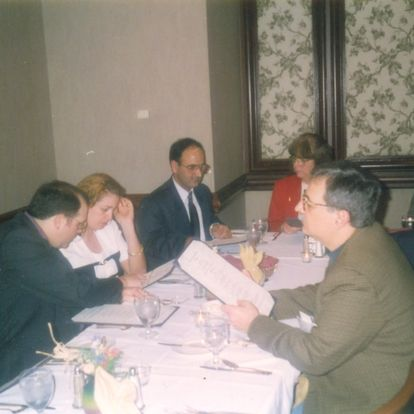
Dr. Tabish during a scientific session at the World Health Forum, Dallas, Texas, USA, February 1998.

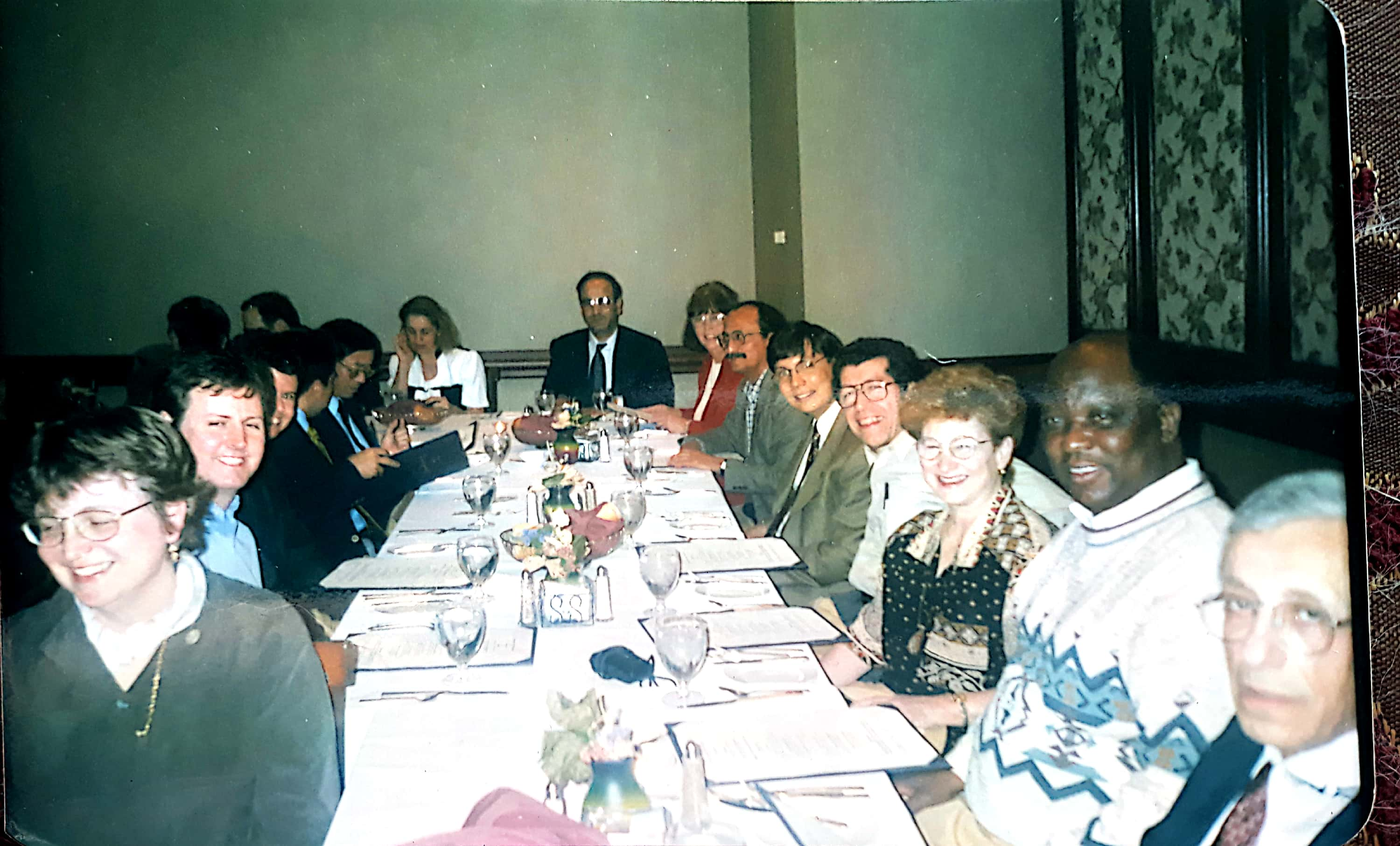
Dr. Tabish at a scientific session, World Health Forum USA 1998.

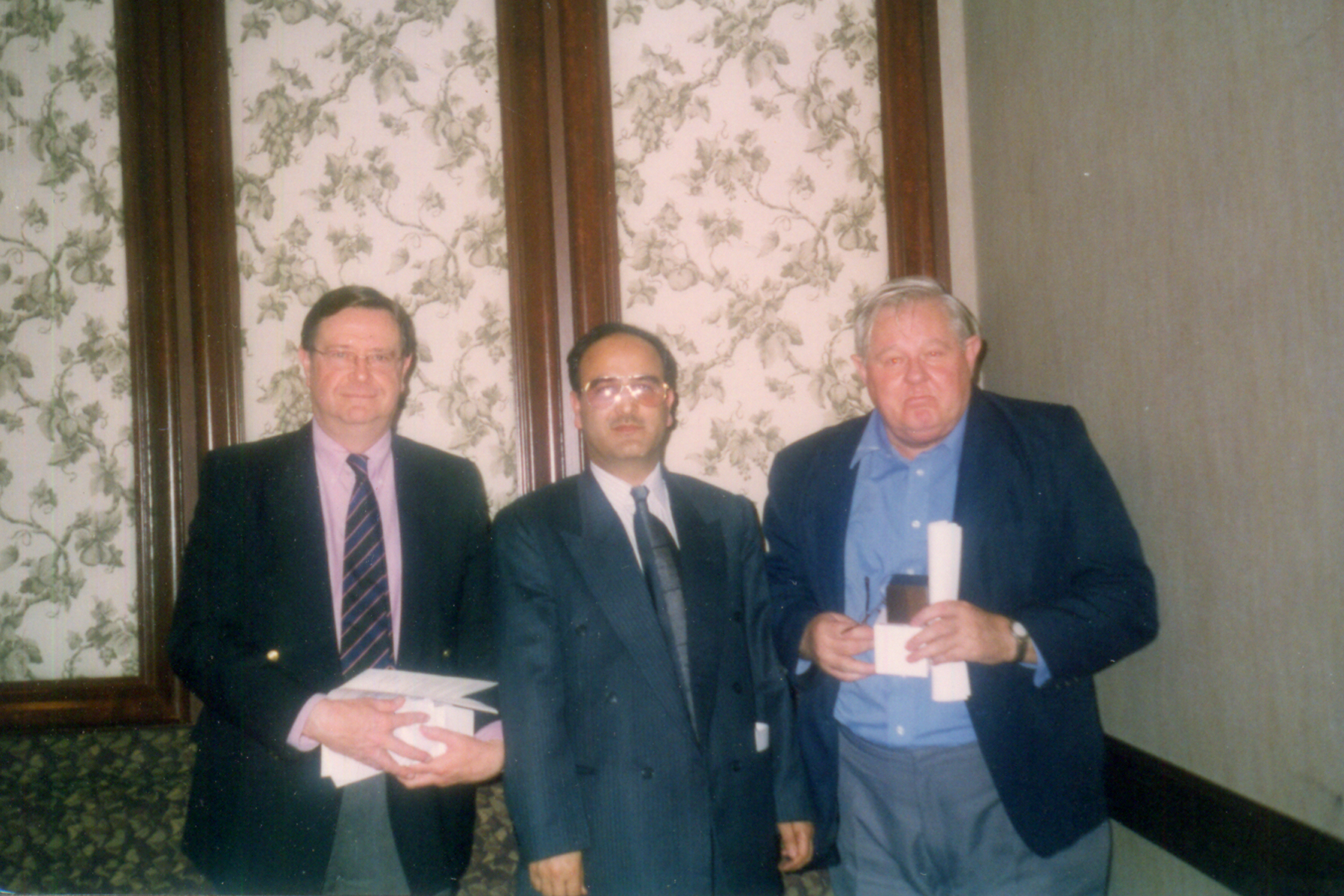
S. Amin Tabish (center) with Errol Pickering (right), Director General of the International Hospital Federation, Dallas, Texas, USA, 1998.

=== Author and poet ===
Tabish has written over 300 articles in English, Urdu, and Kashmiri over four decades. His first book, Hussaini Karvanuk Safar (a history of Karbala), has been included in the curriculum for Master's in the Kashmiri language.

At age 24 Tabish was Secretary-General of the Kashmir Cultural Organisation from 1982 to 1987 and was editor of Koshur Akhbar, the first weekly Kashmiri-language newspaper in India.

Tabish is also a poet. He has written poetry in English, Urdu, and Kashmiri. Four music CDs featuring over 70 songs based on his poems — Doad te Dug, Ake Omri Hound Souruye Safar, Sakoon Diluk, and Mioth Zaher — have been released.

=== Healthcare administrator ===
Tabish worked as Head of Accident & Emergency Services at SKIMS, Srinagar, from 1997 to 2010 and served as chairman from 2010 to 2012. He established a 100-bed emergency department with a tiered level system, which was probably the first of its kind. He also initiated a disaster management program, including a ward dedicated to treating mass casualties efficiently.

As the medical superintendent and head of hospital administration, he introduced initiatives such as total quality management, hospital infection control, and stoma care.

Between 2000 and 2005, Tabish implemented training programs for doctors and nurses at SKIMS, including basic life support, advanced life support, and advanced cardiac life support to strengthen emergency and critical care services.

=== Medical education and research ===
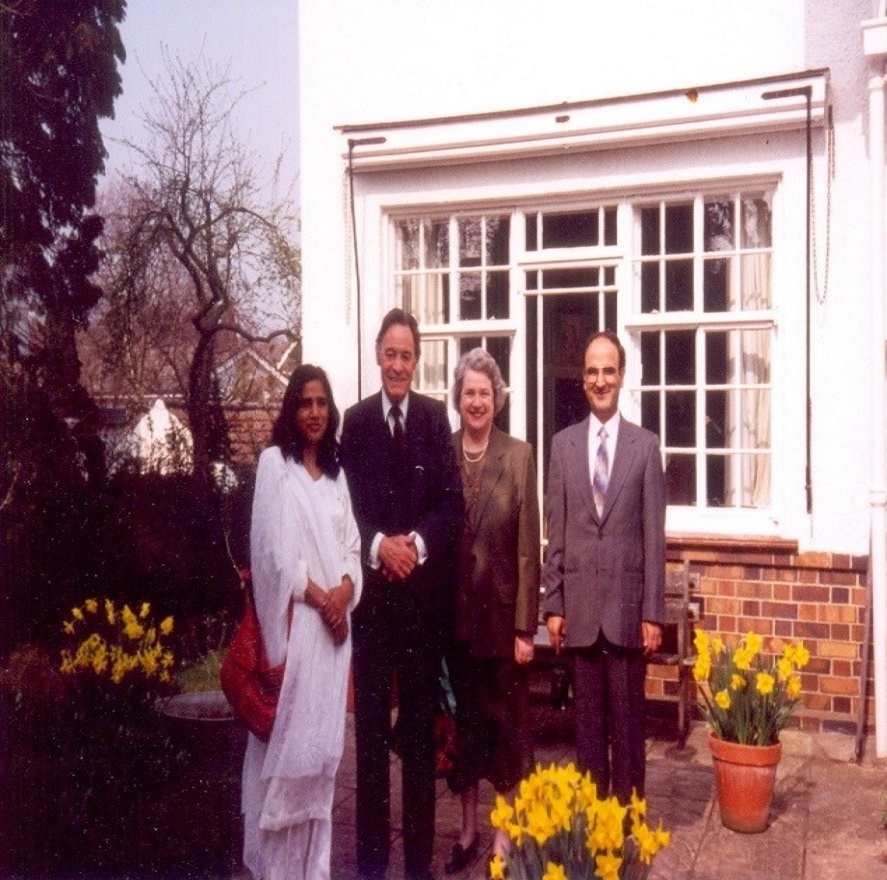
Tabish with Sir A W Macara, Chairman of the British Medical Association, London, 1996.

Tabish organised conferences and seminars for healthcare professionals at SKIMS, AIIMS in New Delhi and Saudi Arabia. He delivered lectures on health issues and medical education internationally in the United Kingdom, the Middle East, India, and the United States of America, and chaired scientific sessions at various international conferences. His research focuses include traumatic brain injury, lifestyle diseases, infectious diseases, pandemics, health policy, and recent trends in medical education.

Among over 500 publications, his works include:

- "Is Diabetes Becoming the Biggest Epidemic of the Twenty-first Century?" (610 citations),
- "Complementary and Alternative Healthcare: Is it evidence-based?" (450 citations),
- "Assessment methods in medical education" (210 citations),
- "COVID-19 Pandemic: Emerging Perspectives and Future Trends" (150 citations),
- "The profile of head injuries and traumatic brain injury deaths in Kashmir" (120 citations).
- "Lifestyle Diseases: consequences, characteristics, causes and control (150 citations)"

Tabish has been a Member and then Fellow of The New York Academy of Sciences since 1997. Tabish was elected Fellow of the International Medical Sciences Academy in 1998. He later became a Fellow of the National Academy of Medical Sciences in New Delhi in 2003, and of the American College of Physicians (USA) in 2006. In addition, he received fellowships from the Royal College of Physicians in London (2002) and the Royal College of Physicians of Edinburgh (2004).

=== Academics ===
Tabish served as a Medical Council of India Inspector/Assessor from 2010 to 2020. He has been a selection expert for faculty positions at AIIMS, SGPGI Lucknow, and Qassim University.

He has been a visiting professor at universities in Saudi Arabia and acted as an external examiner for AIIMS New Delhi, Nizam's Institute of Medical Sciences Hyderabad, and the National Board of Examinations (India).

Tabish contributed chapters to the Jammu and Kashmir Board of School Education syllabus for 7th through 10th classes. He served as the Founder Editor-in-Chief of the International Journal of Health Sciences published by Qassim University in Saudi Arabia from January 2007 to December 2009.

He introduced MSc Nursing at the Nursing College of SKIMS and facilitated PhD programs in nursing for several candidates. Tabish also played a key role in establishing the Jammu & Kashmir Nursing Council.

He also contributed to the establishment of the Department of Surgical Gastroenterology at SKIMS during 2004–2005.

== Bibliography ==
Books authored by Tabish have been included in academic syllabi of various universities and colleges, and are held in several institutional libraries worldwide.

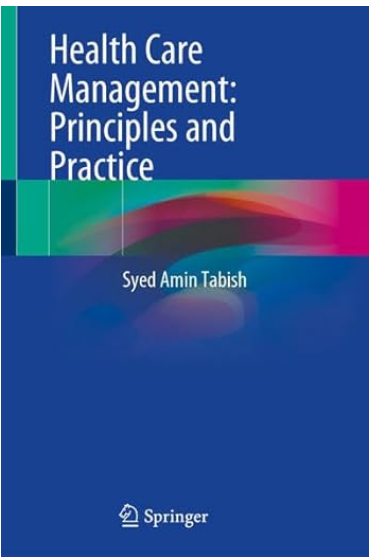
1

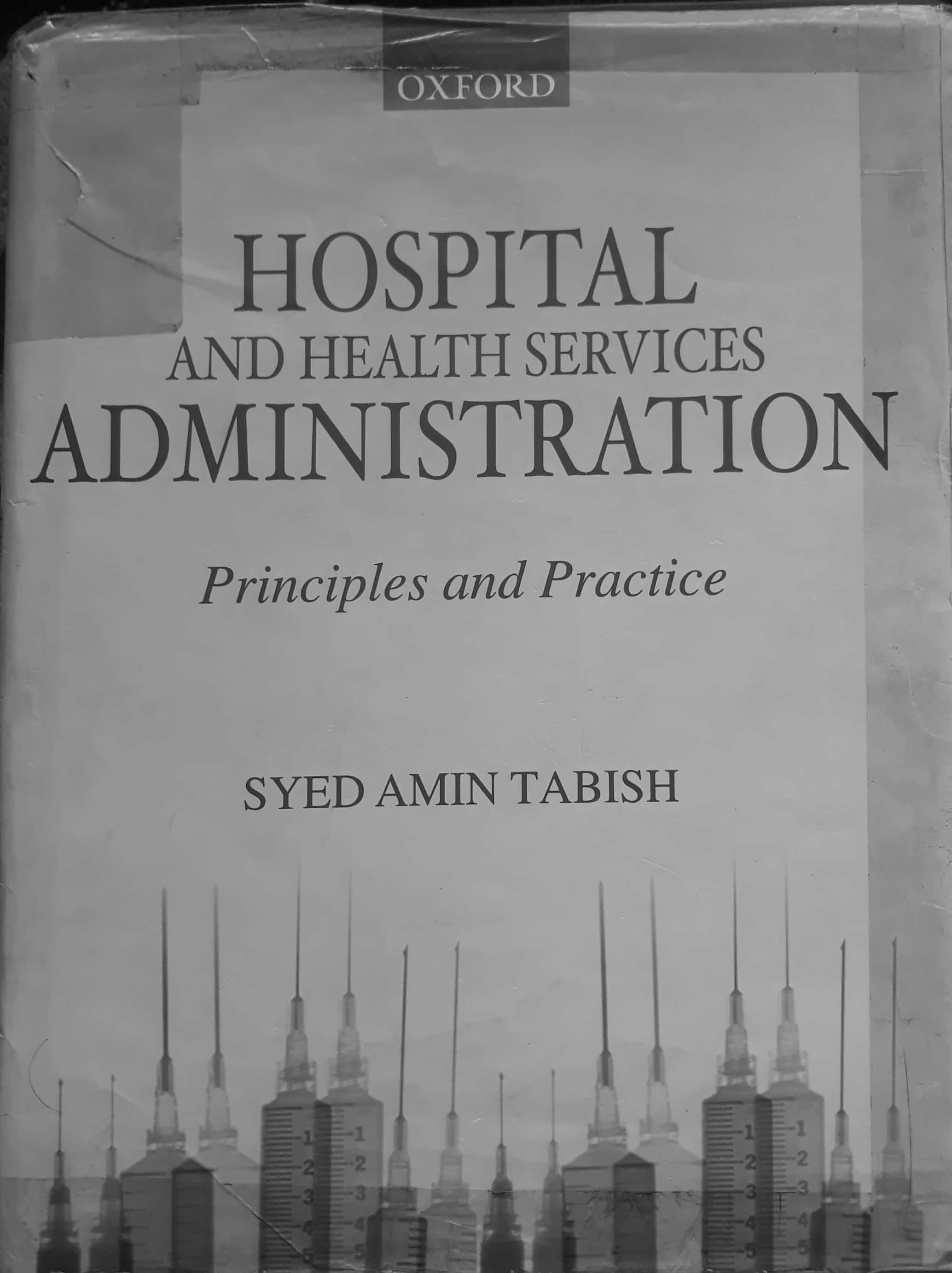
2

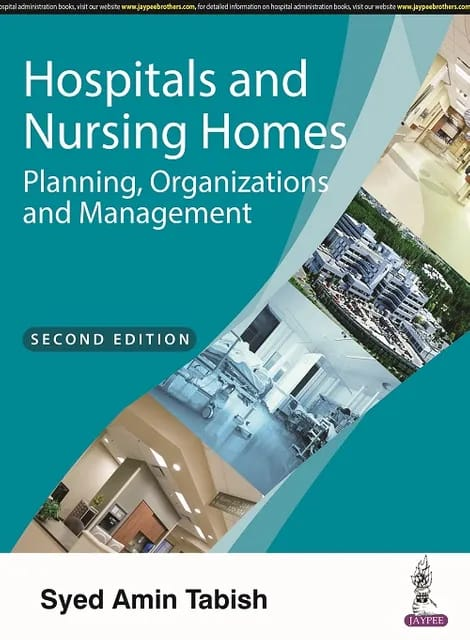
3

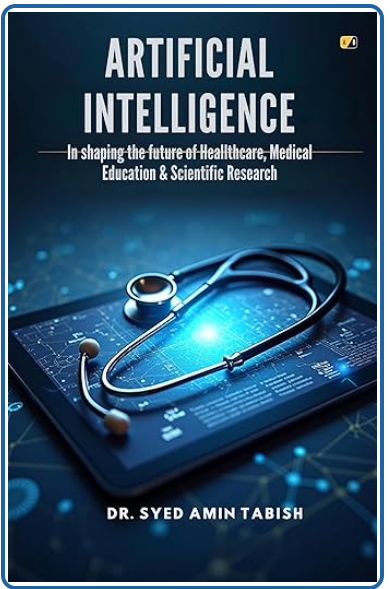
4

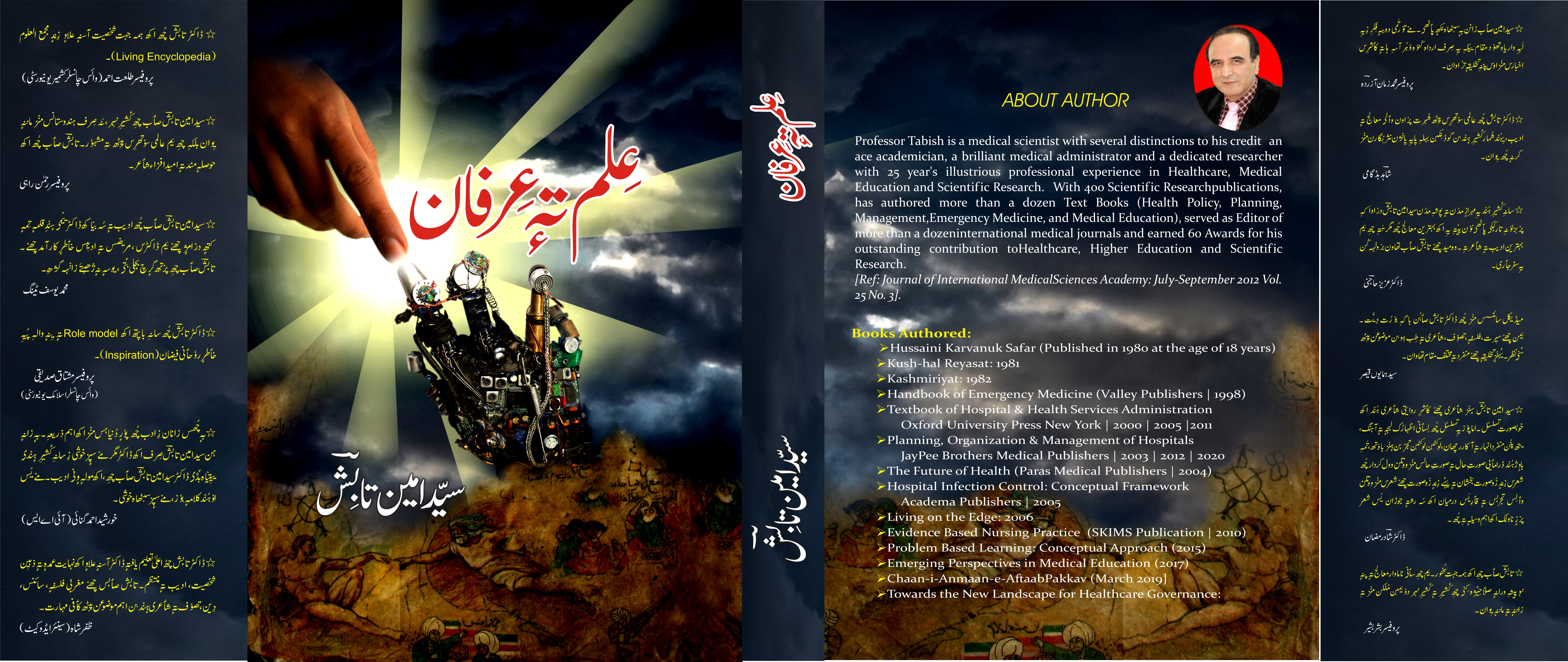
5

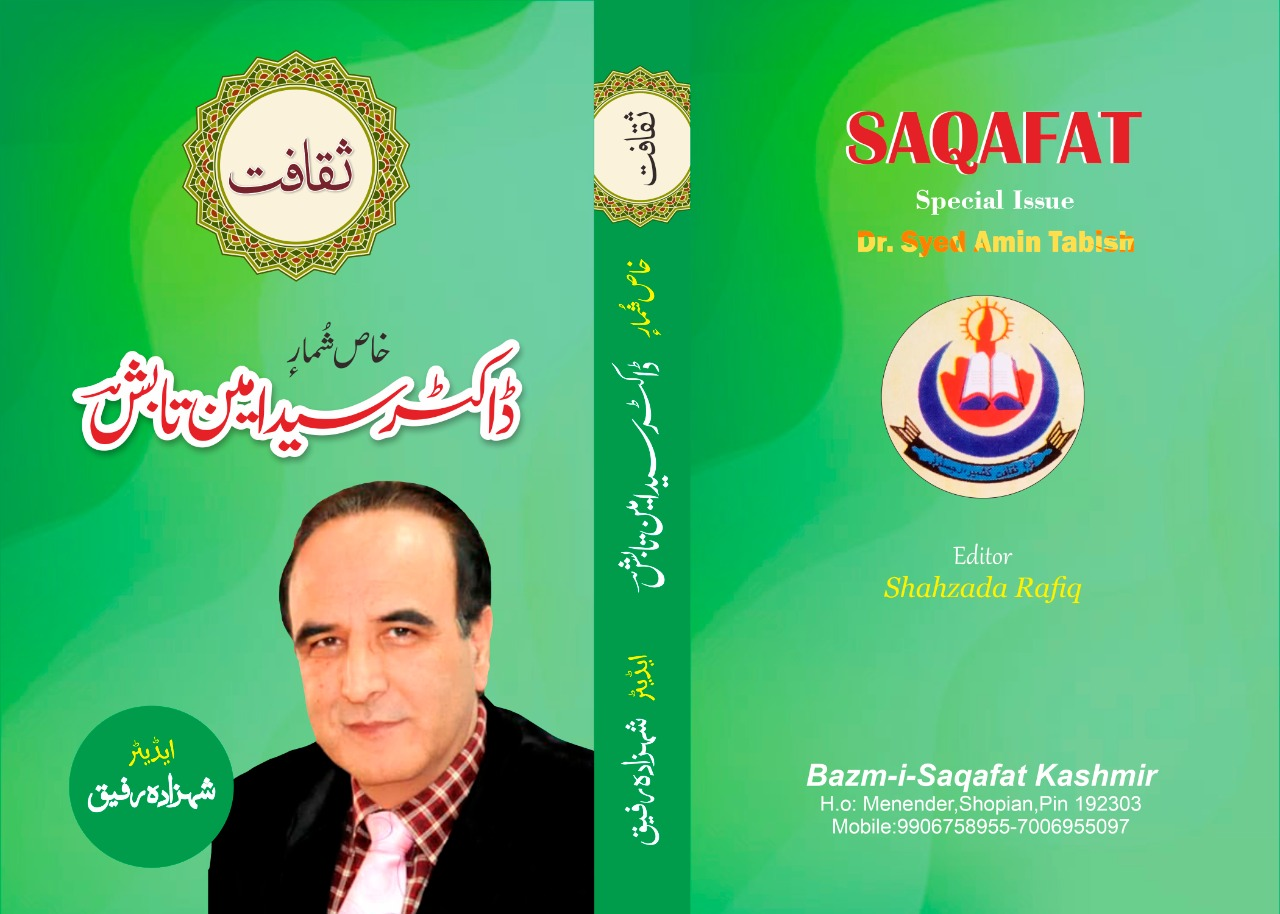
7

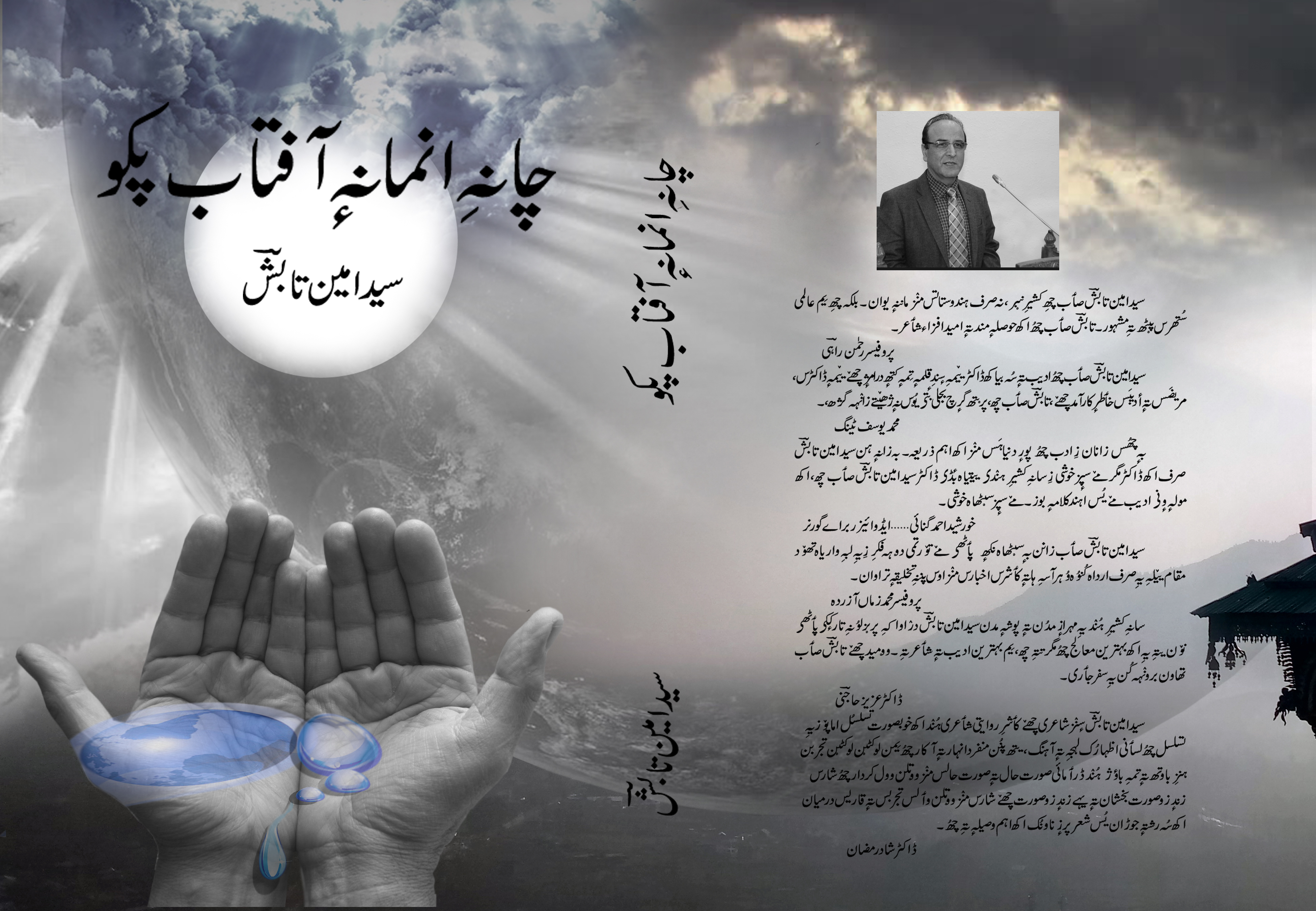
8

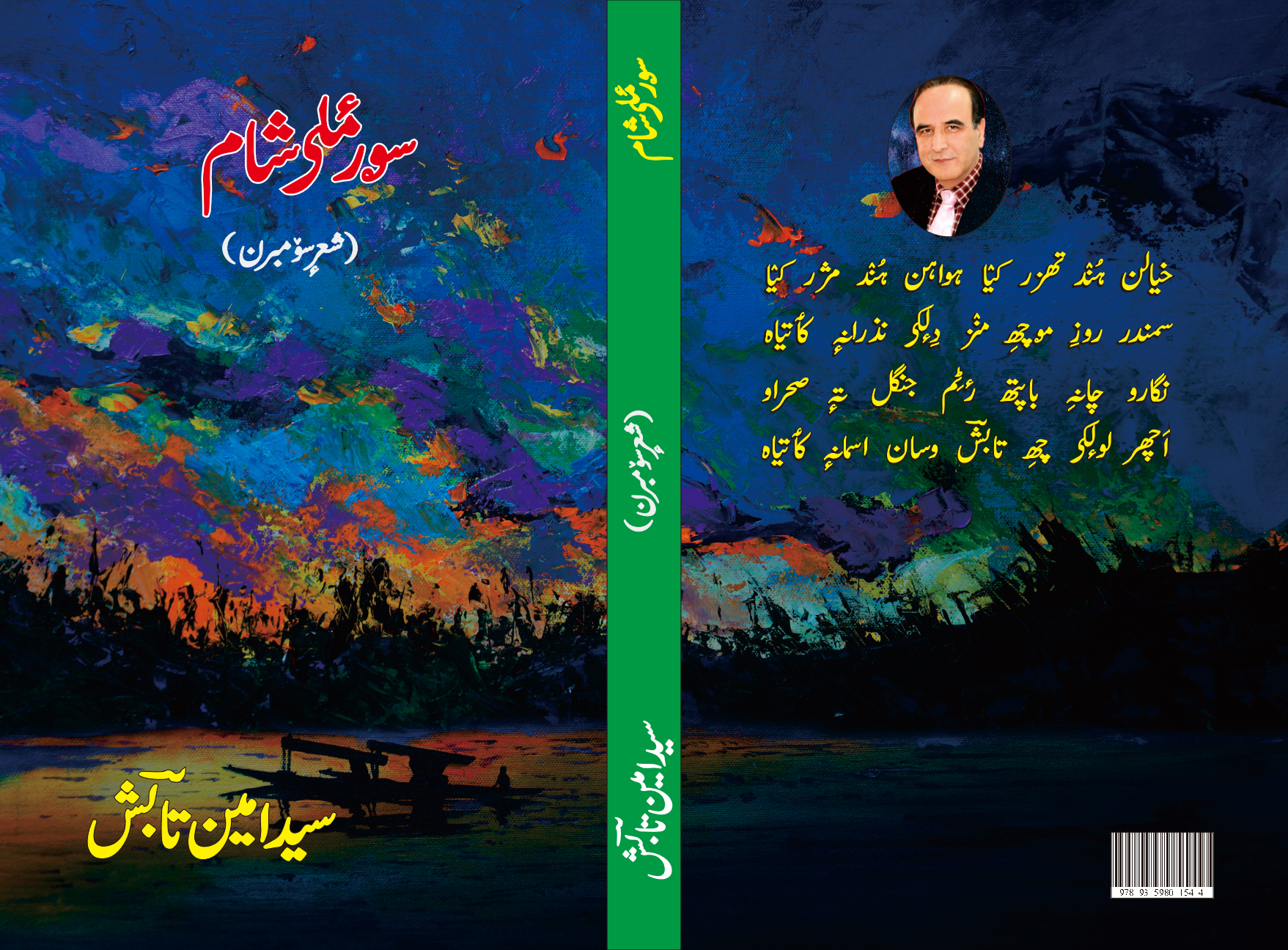
9

| No. | Title | Publisher | Year |
|---|---|---|---|
| 1 | Handbook of Emergency Medicine | Valley Publishers | 1998 |
| 2 | Textbook of Hospital and Health Services Administration | Oxford University Press, New York | 2000 |
| 3 | Planning, Organization & Management of Hospitals, First Edition | Jaypee Brothers Medical Publishers | 2003 |
| 4 | The Future of Health | Paras Medical Publishers | 2004 |
| 5 | Hospital Infection Control: Conceptual Framework | Academia Publishers | 2005 |
| 6 | Evidence Based Nursing Practice | SKIMS Publications | 2005 |
| 7 | Chan i Anmana Aftab Pakav | Kashmir Markazi e Adab wa Saqafat | 2019 |
| 8 | Ilm Te Irfan | Al-Hayat Publishers, Srinagar | 2020 |
| 9 | Hospitals and Nursing Homes: Planning, Organization and Management, Second Edition | Jaypee Brothers Medical Publishers | 2022 |
| 10 | Saqafat | Bazm e Saqafat Kashmir | 2022 |
| 11 | Health Care Management: Principles and Practice | Springer Nature | 2024 |
| 12 | Sourmali Shaam | Al-Hayat Publications, Srinagar | 2024 |
| 13 | Artificial Intelligence, in shaping the future of healthcare, Medical Education and Scientific Research. | Adhyyan Books | 2025 |

== Awards and honors ==
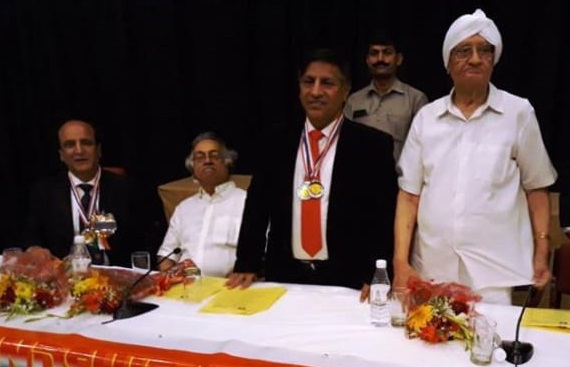
Dr. Tabish receiving the Dr. A. P. J. Abdul Kalam Award

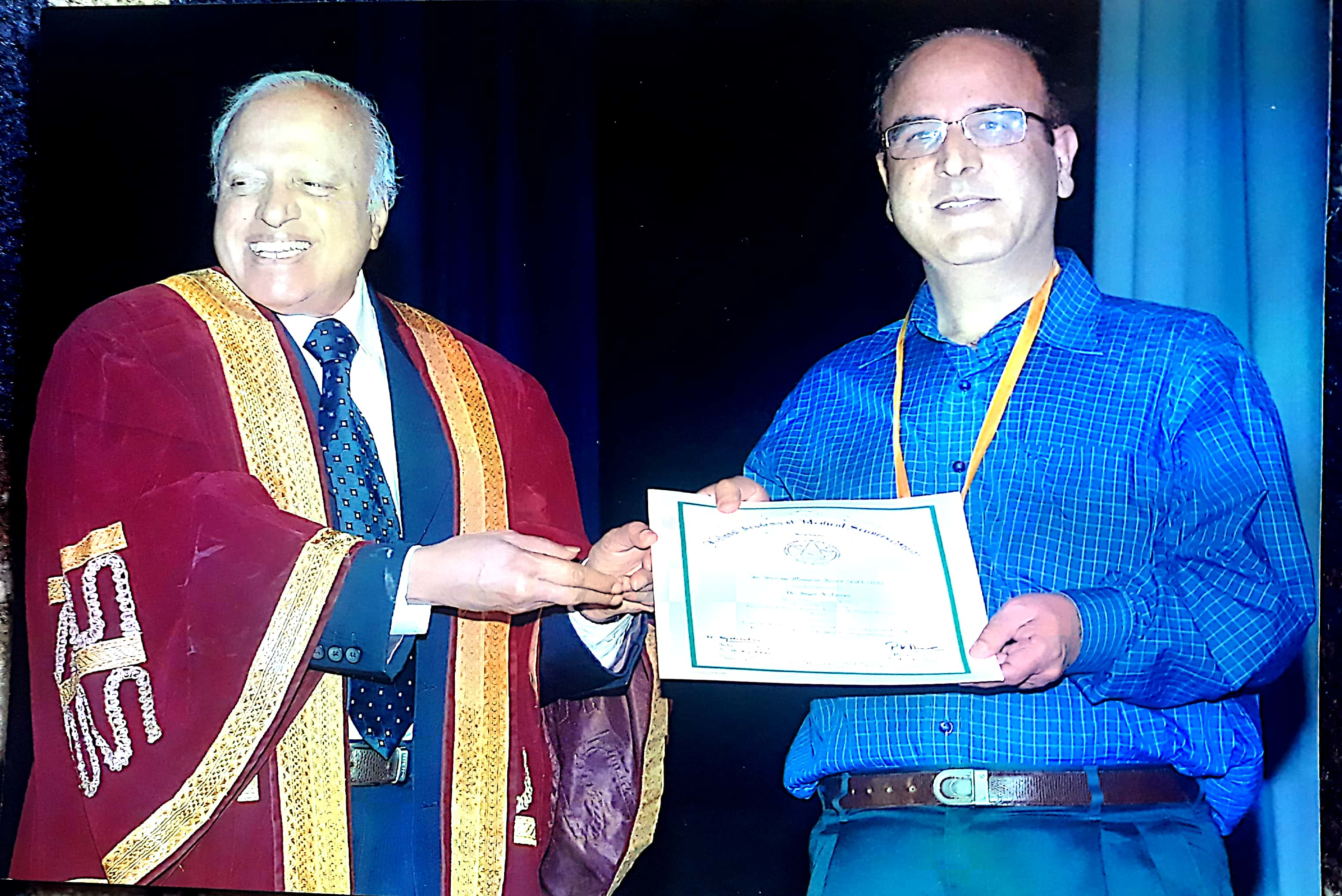
Dr. S. Amin Tabish receiving the Sri Ram Memorial Award from NAMS

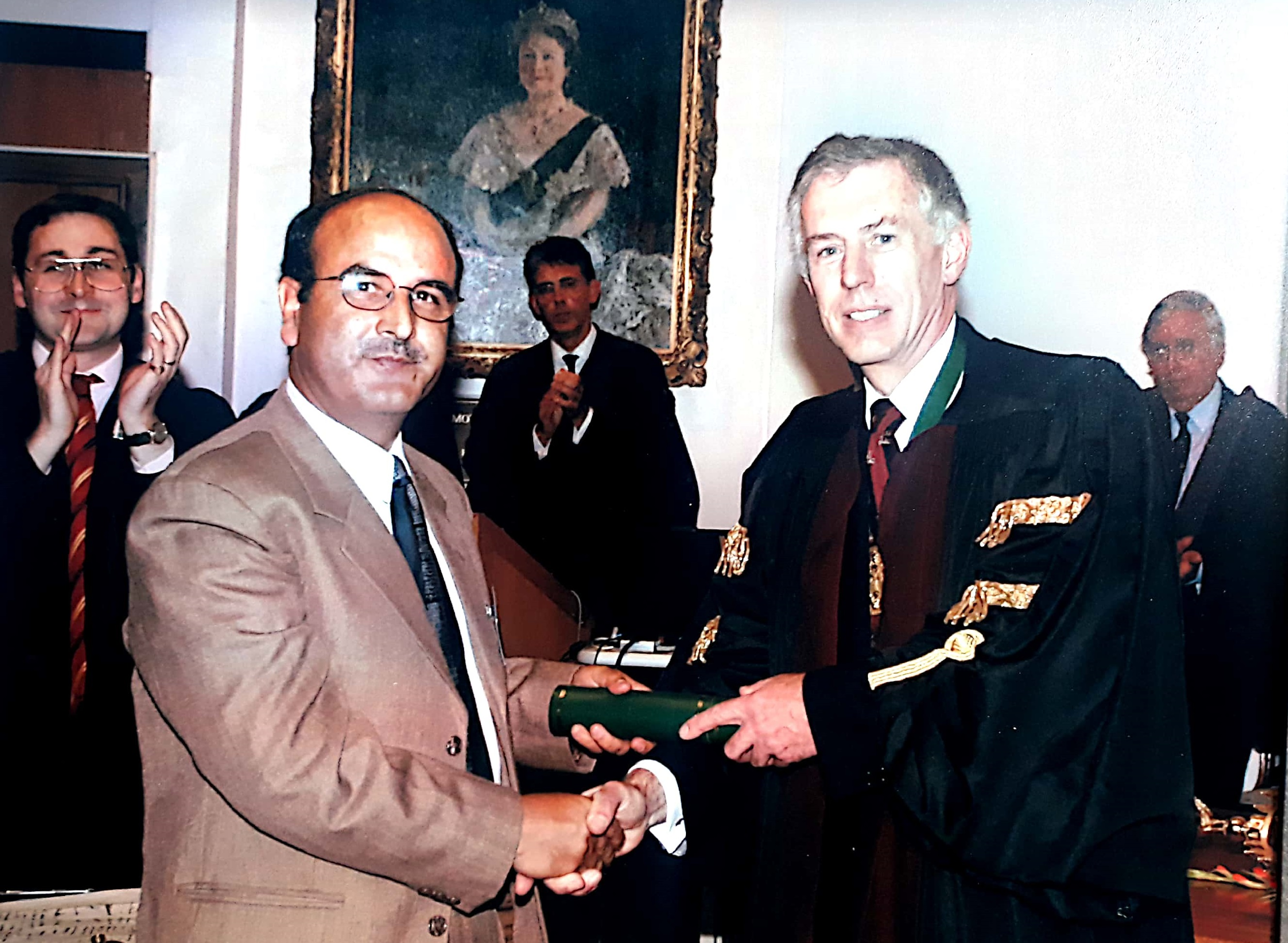
Dr. Tabish receiving the FRCP (United Kingdom) in 2002

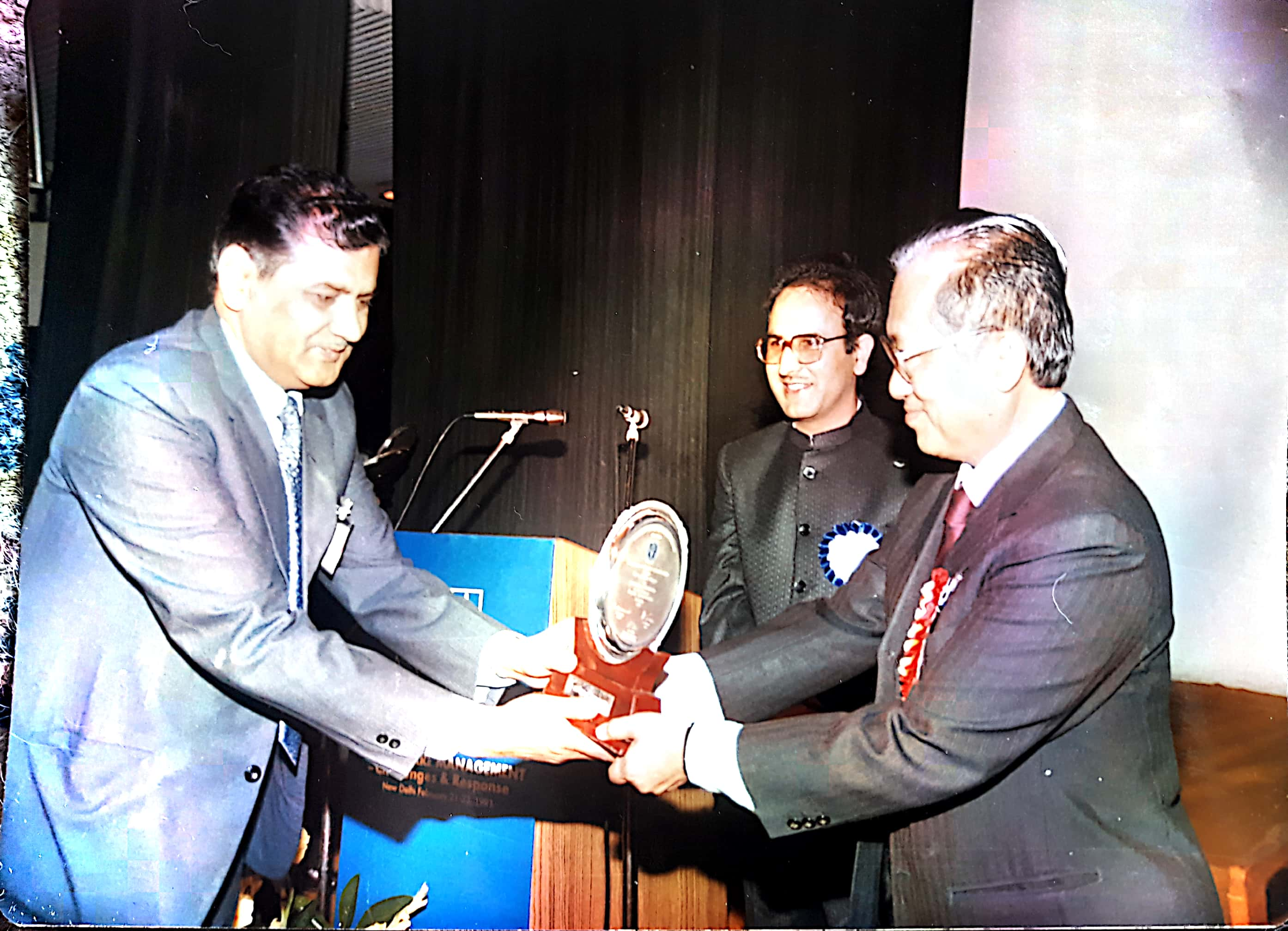
Dr. Tabish with Dr. U KoKo, Regional Director of the WHO SEARO, at AIIMS during an international conference

Syed Amin Tabish has received several awards and recognitions for his contributions to medical science, literature, and cultural activities.

He was awarded the Asian Admirable Achievers Award in 2023 by Rifacimento International, New Delhi.

He received Sir Sriram Memorial Award of 2004 from the National Academy of Medical Sciences, for outstanding contribution to healthcare and distinguished services to Medical Education

He received the Best Paper Award 2015 by International Journal of Civil, Structural, Environmental and Infrastructure Engineering Research and Development.

In 2018, he received the Dr. A. P. J. Abdul Kalam Award for his contributions to healthcare and education.

In November 2024,Sahitya Akademi organized a literary function in Srinagar to honor Tabish as a writer, poet, and researcher. During the event, his poetry collection Sourmali Shaam (Dusky Evening) was officially released.

He was also recognized by Fakhruddin Ali Ahmad Memorial Committee and the Mahasagar Shiksha Samiti in Lucknow, Uttar Pradesh, for his contributions to science and literature.

== See also ==
- M. Srinivas
- Randeep Guleria
- Jeremy Farrar
- Adel Mahmoud
- Stanley Plotkin
- Moslem Bahadori
