= Chandrakant Lahariya =

Indian doctor and author

- Education: University of Delhi, University of Geneva, Pasteur Institute, Paris
- Years active: 1998–present
- Employer(s): World Health Organization, Pacific OneHealth Hospitals, New Delhi, Asian Development Bank, UNICEF ROSA
- Notable work: Pill-Free: You Dont Need Everything You Have Been Prescribed, 2026 The Thin Fat Indians: Your Practical Guide to Healthy Weight, Better Metabolism, and Lifelong Fitness, 2026 Till We Win: India's Fight Against The COVID-19 pandemic, 2020
- Website: www.chandrakantlahariya.com

Chandrakant Lahariya is an Indian medical doctor, public health & policy expert, leading preventive medicine and cardio-metabolic health expert and renowened writer.

Lahariya is the author of three popular books including Till We Win: India's Fight Against The COVID-19 pandemic. which was published in 2020 and became bestseller in India. In early 2008, Lahariya joined the World Health Organization in India, where - in the years which followed - he coordinated the organization's work on the new vaccines introduced in the country.

== Awards and recognitions ==
In the year 2012, he received Indian Council of Medical Research's Dr B.C. Srivastava Foundation Award for his work on translating community-based health research into public policy interventions.

Dr Lahariya is first and only Indian till date to receive prestigious Wiley Research Heroes Prize, 2025, for his work/research which has impact beyond academia . In October 2020, in a study conducted by Stanford University and published in the reputed PLoS Biology, Lahariya was listed amongst the top 2% of researchers globally, in the fields of pediatrics and public health. He has since then been consistently included in the list of Top 2% researcher globally, till 2026. He is amongst highest ranked Indian reserachers in the field of paediatrics and clinical medicine.

== Books and writing ==
Lahariya is the author of the book Till We Win: India's Fight Against The COVID-19 pandemic, co-authored with Randeep Guleria of AIIMS, New Delhi and Gagandeep Kang of Christian Medical College, Vellore.

In 2026, his two more popular books - The Thin Fat Indians: Your Practical Guide to healthy weight, better metabolism and lifelong fitness (published by Publication Division, Ministry of Information and Boradcasting, Government of India) and "Pill-Free: You Dont Need Everything You have Been Prescribed (Penguin Random House India, 2026) were released.

In 2009–10, Lahariya was the guest editor (along with Dr Vinod Kumar Paul, then Professor of pediatrics at AIIMS, New Delhi and now Member of NITI Aayog, Govt. of India) of a special series on child survival in India. This series was published in the Indian Journal of Pediatrics and had contributions from leading Indian health experts including Prema Ramachandran, Deoki Nandan, Prasanna K. Hota, and Shiv Lal. Lahariya who had co-authored a few articles, including one with Dr Vinod Kumar Paul of NITI Aayog.

== Selected publications ==
- Lahariya, Chandrakant; Sundararaman, T.; Ved, Rajani R.; Adithyan, G. S.; Graeve, Hilde De; Jhalani, Manoj; Bekedam, Henk (1 February 2020). "What makes primary healthcare facilities functional, and increases the utilization? Learnings from 12 case studies". Journal of Family Medicine and Primary Care. 9 (2): 539–546. doi:10.4103/jfmpc.jfmpc_1240_19. PMC 7114016. PMID 32318378.
- Lahariya, Chandrakant; Roy, Bijit; Shukla, Abhay; Chatterjee, Mirai; Graeve, Hilde De; Jhalani, Manoj; Bekedam, Henk (1 January 2020). "Community action for health in India: evolution, lessons learnt and ways forward to achieve universal health coverage". WHO South-East Asia Journal of Public Health. 9 (1): 82–91. doi:10.4103/2224-3151.283002. PMID 32341227. S2CID 216594708.
- Lahariya, Chandrakant (1 April 2014). "A brief history of vaccines & vaccination in India". Indian Journal of Medical Research. 139 (4): 491–511. PMC 4078488. PMID 24927336.
- Lahariya, Chandrakant; Paul, Vinod K. (1 November 2010). "Burden, Differentials, and Causes of Child Deaths in India". The Indian Journal of Pediatrics. 77 (11): 1312–1321. doi:10.1007/s12098-010-0185-z. PMID 20830536. S2CID 3441068.
- Mishra, Ashok; Mishra, Subodh; Jain, Pankaj; Bhadoriya, Rahul Singh; Mishra, Rakesh; Lahariya, Chandrakant (September 2008). "Measles related complications and the role of vitamin A supplementation". The Indian Journal of Pediatrics. 75 (9): 887–890. doi:10.1007/s12098-008-0089-3. PMID 18568439. S2CID 27703322.
- Lahariya, Chandrakant (2007). "Global eradication of polio: the case for "finishing the job"". Bulletin of the World Health Organization. 85 (6): 487–492. doi:10.2471/BLT.06.037457. PMC 2636341. PMID 17639247.
- Lahariya, Chandrakant; Pradhan, SK (March 2007). "Can Southeast Asia eradicate yaws by 2010? Some lessons from the Yaws Eradication Programme of India". The National Medical Journal of India. 20 (2): 81–6. PMID 17802987.
- Lahariya, C; Pradhan, SK (December 2006). "Emergence of chikungunya virus in Indian subcontinent after 32 years: A review". Journal of Vector Borne Diseases. 43 (4): 151–60. PMID 17175699.
- Lahariya, C; Sharma, AK; Pradhan, SK (April 2006). "Avian flu and possible human pandemic" (PDF). Indian Pediatrics. 43 (4): 317–25. PMID 16651670.
