= Gagandeep Kang =

Indian medical researcher

Gagandeep Kang FRS
- Born: November 3, 1962 (age 63); Simla
- Education: Christian Medical College, Vellore (MBBS, MD, PhD)
- Awards: Infosys Prize (2016)
- Scientific career
- Fields: Infectious disease Vaccines; Enteric infections Water; Sanitation
- Workplaces: Christian Medical College, Vellore; Baylor College of Medicine; Translational Health Science and Technology Institute
- Website: cmcwtrl.in

Gagandeep Kang FRS (born 3 November 1962) is an Indian public healthresearcher who has been leading the work on enteric diseases, diagnostics, genomics and epidemiology at the Gates Foundation since 2023.

Kang was on the faculty of the Christian Medical College, Vellore from 1991 to 2023 when she retired as a Senior Professor in the Department of Gastrointestinal Sciences at the Christian Medical College, Vellore, India. From August 2016 to August 2020, she was the Executive Director of the Translational Health Science and Technology Institute, Faridabad, an autonomous institute of the Department of Biotechnology, Ministry of Science and Technology, Government of India. Her major research focus is on viral infections in children, and the testing of rotaviral vaccines. She also works on other enteric infections and their consequences when children are infected in early life, sanitation and water safety. Her early research was on understanding the transmission and pathogenesis of infectious diseases, particularly those affecting children in developing countries. She was awarded the prestigious Infosys Prize in Life Sciences in 2016 for her contributions to understanding the natural history of rotavirus and other infectious diseases. In 2019, she became the first, and so far, the only, Indian woman to be elected as a Fellow of the Royal Society. In 2023, she was elected to the US National Academy of Medicine in recognition of her contributions to child health. She received the Canada John Dirks Gairdner Prize in Global Health in 2024 for the establishment of multiple birth cohort studies that resulted in a clearer understanding of differences in patterns of enteric infections in different parts of the world.

She has made significant contributions to policy development for vaccination and for public health, working with the Government of India and the World Health Organization by serving on advisory committees.

Kang co-authored the 2020 book Till We Win: India's Fight Against The COVID-19 pandemic, with Chandrakant Lahariya, a public policy and health system expert and Randeep Guleria, then director of AIIMS, New Delhi. The book was published by publisher Penguin Random House in India.

== Early life and education ==
Gagandeep Kang was born in Shimla on 3 November 1962. Her mother taught English and history and her father was a mechanical engineer in the Indian Railways. Kang grew up moving around north and east India, changing schools frequently. To catch up with curricula in each school, her father and she built a lab to conduct experiments in physics and chemistry.

Kang completed her Bachelor of Medicine, Bachelor of Surgery (MBBS) in 1987 and her Doctor of Medicine (MD) in Microbiology in 1991 from Christian Medical College, Vellore and obtained her PhD in 1998. She obtained her membership of the Royal College of Pathologists in 2000 and carried out postdoctoral research with Mary K. Estes at the Baylor College of Medicine, Houston before returning to the Christian Medical College.

== Career and research ==
Kang is a medical scientist who has worked on diarrhea diseases and public health in India since the early 1990s. She is a key contributor to Rotavirus epidemiology and vaccinology in India. Focusing on vaccines, enteric infections and nutrition in young children in disadvantaged communities, she has combined field epidemiology with intensive laboratory investigations to inform both the science of infectious diseases and policy in India. Her comprehensive research on rotavirus has demonstrated the high burden of rotavirus disease across India, the genetic diversity of viruses, the lower protection from infection and vaccines and the exploration of several approaches to improve the performance of oral vaccines. Her work has led to her being described as India's "vaccine godmother".

Kang has published over 450 scientific papers and is or was on editorial boards for several journals. She was on many review committees for national and international research funding agencies, and has served on several advisory committees mainly related to vaccines, including India's National Technical Advisory Group on Immunisation, the WHO's Global Advisory Committee on Vaccine Safety and the Immunisation and Vaccine Implementation Research Advisory Committee. She chairs the WHO SEAR's Regional Immunisation Technical Advisory Group (2015–present). She has received honorary appointments as an associate faculty member at the Johns Hopkins University Bloomberg School of Public Health in Baltimore, Maryland and adjunct professor at Tufts University School of Medicine in Boston, Massachusetts. She is a Fellow of the Royal College of Pathologists, the UK Faculty of Public Health, the American Academy of Microbiology and of Indian Academy of Sciences, National Academy of Sciences in India and the Indian National Science Academy, as well as the Royal Society.

Kang played a significant role in the efforts that culminated in the development of Rotavac, a vaccine from Bharat Biotech that targets diarrhea. She was one of three principal investigators in the Phase III clinical trials of the vaccine. Her initial interest was in identifying the correlates of protection against the rotavirus. She and others began by recreating a study conducted in Mexico to identify children protected from rotaviral infection, research the immune responses and isolate the correlate of protection. The recreated study itself did not succeed, but it did develop high quality laboratory methods for the detection of rotaviruses. Kang and one of her students subsequently established vaccine assays for rotavirus infections, used in testing Rotavac.

During the COVID-19 pandemic, Kang played an influential role in science communication by writing op-eds, speaking online and in interviews on television, and serving as a credible voice against misinformation. She was part of the COVID-19 vaccine safety working group at WHO and the COVID-19 vaccine working group of the National Technical Advisory Group on Immunization.

== Other activities ==
- Global Health Centre, Graduate Institute of International and Development Studies, Member of the International Advisory Board (2020-2023)
- Coalition for Epidemic Preparedness Innovations (CEPI), Member of the Board (2018–2023)
- Bill and Melinda Gates Foundation, Member of the Global Health Scientific Advisory Committee

== Recognition ==
Kang is the first Indian woman scientist to be elected a Fellow of the Royal Society (FRS) in 359 years of history of this scientific academy. She was the ninth woman and the first physician-scientist to be awarded an Infosys Prize. She is the first Indian and the first woman to edit Manson's Textbook of Tropical Medicine. Other awards and honours include:

- 1998–1999 – Dr. P.N. Berry Fellowship
- 2005 – The Lourdu Yedanapalli Award for Excellence in Research
- 2006 – Woman Bioscientist of the Yearś
- 2016 – Infosys Prize in Life Sciences
- 2019 – Elected a Fellow of the Royal Society (FRS)
- 2024 – Canada Gairdner Global Health Award
