= List of Ihsan Doğramacı Family Health Foundation Prize recipients =

This is a list of recipients of the Ihsan Doğramacı Family Health Foundation Prize awarded by World Health Organization (WHO).

Established in 1980 by Professor İhsan Doğramacı (1915–2010) to celebrate paediatricians and child health specialists who have given distinguished service in this field every two years. The prize consists of a gold-plated silver medal, a certificate, and an honorarium for services in the field of family health.

== List of recipients ==
=== Ihsan Doğramacı Family Health Foundation Prize ===
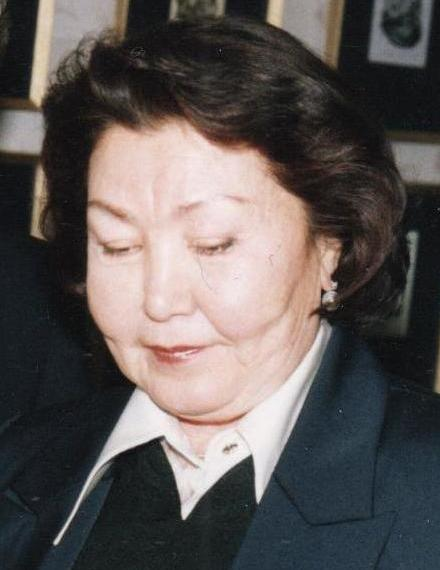
Sara Nazarbayeva, 1997 laureate

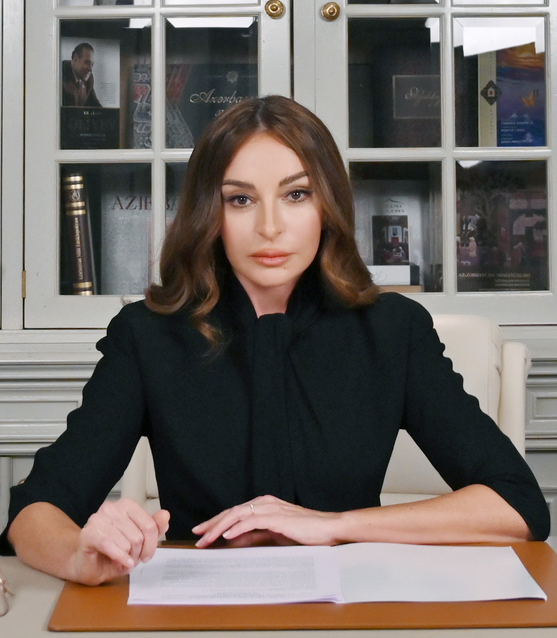
Mehriban Aliyeva, 2007 laureate

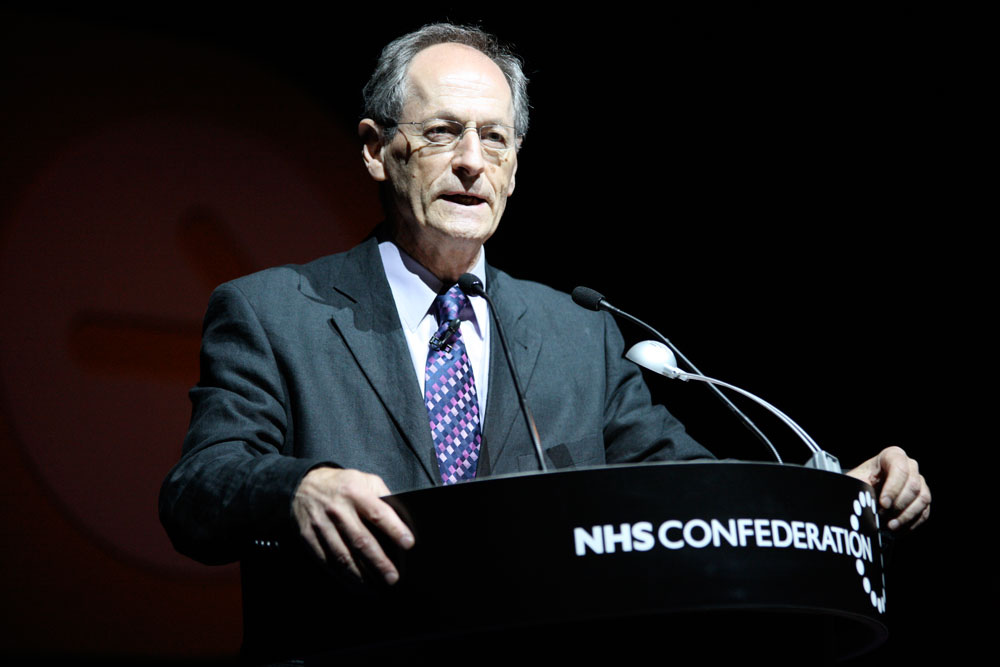
Michael Marmot, 2016 laureate

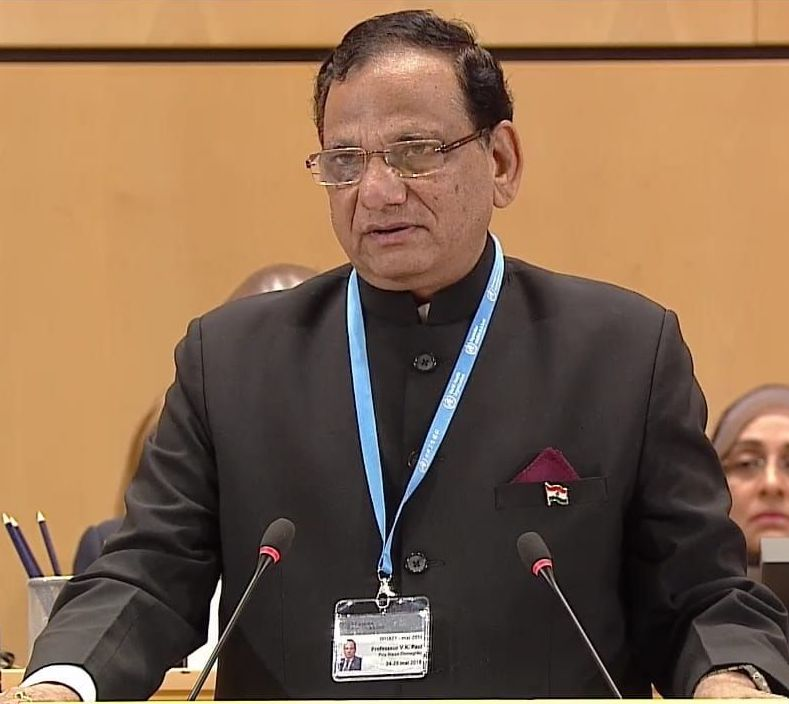
Vinod Kumar Paul, 2018 laureate

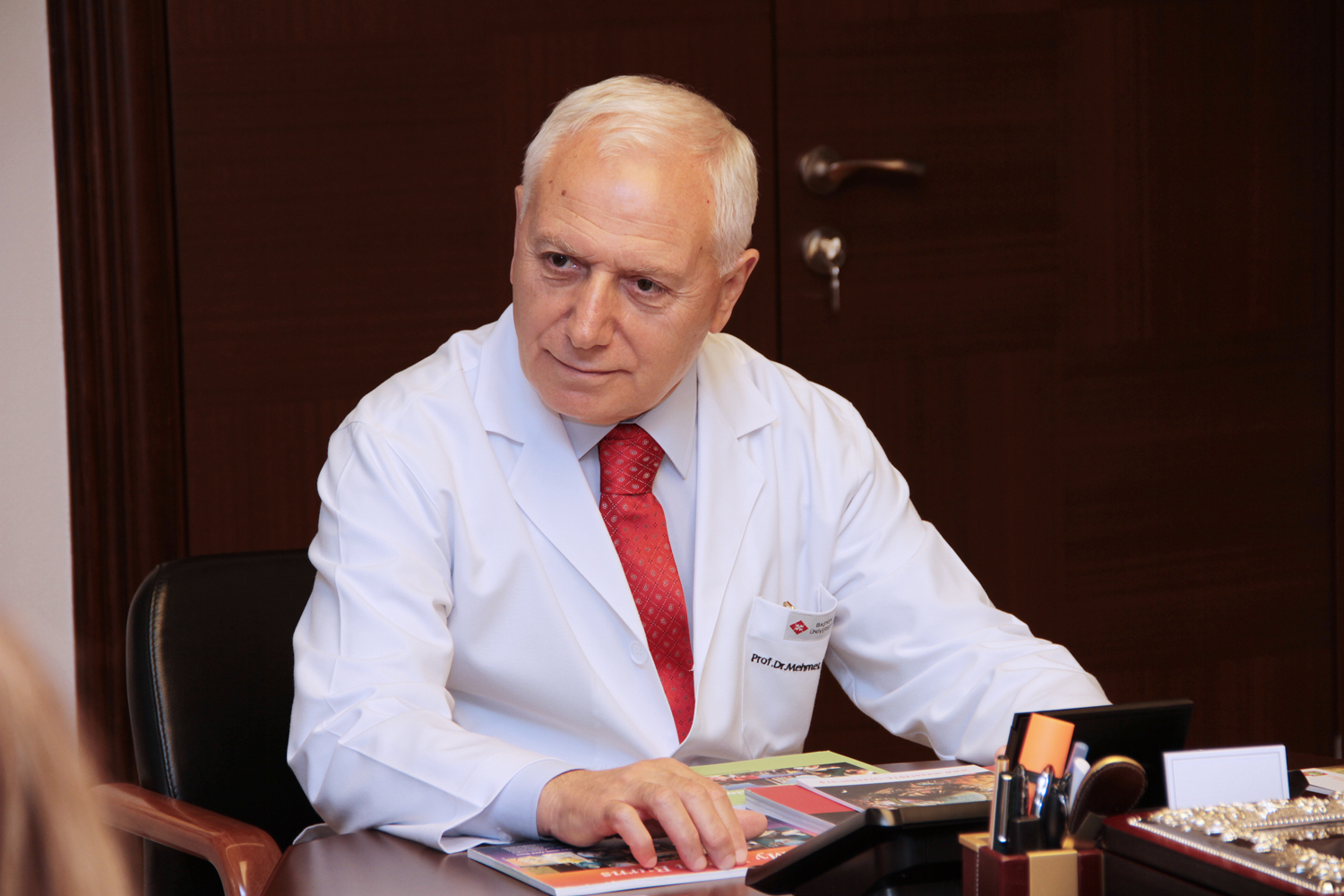
Mehmet Haberal, 2022 laureate

Year	Name	Country
1997	Sara Nazarbayeva	Kazakhstan
1999	Münevver Bertan	Turkey
2001	Mahmoud Fathalla	Egypt
2002	Elisabeth Wollast	Belgium
2007	Mehriban Aliyeva	Azerbaijan
2007	Guillermina Natera Rey	Mexico
2012	Ayse Akin	Turkey
2014	Zulfiqar Bhutta	Pakistan
2016	Michael Marmot	UK
2018	Vinod Kumar Paul	India
2020	Errol R. Alden	USA
2022	Mehmet Haberal	Turkey
2024	Jamila Taiseer Yasser Al Abri	Oman

=== Ihsan Doğramacı Family Health Foundation Fellowship ===
Year	Name	Country
1999	Mangny Justine Coffi	Côte d'Ivoire
2001	Anne Ormisson	Estonia
2003	Ly Sovann	Cambodia

=== Child Health Foundation Fellowship ===
Year	Name	Country
1983	B. Hamza	Tunisia
1985	Perla Santos Ocampo	Philippines
1987	José R. Jordan	Cuba
1987	Sanaths Punsara Lamabadusuriya	Sri Lanka
1989	Mohamadou Guélaye Sall	Senegal
1989	Hussein Kamel Bahaaeldin	Egypt
1991	N. Gendenjamts	Mongolia
1991	Boubacar Camara	Senegal
1993	Chryssa Tzoumaka-Bakoula	Greece
1995	Deryaev Invar	Turkmenistan
