= VIMS =

VIMS may refer to:

- Motion sickness (Visually Induced Motion Sickness), the discomfort experienced when motion is seen but not felt.
- Vijayanagara Institute of Medical Sciences, a medical college in Bellary, India
- Virginia Institute of Marine Science, a graduate school for the study of oceanography at The College of William & Mary in Williamsburg, Virginia, USA
- Visual and Infrared Mapping Spectrometer, an instrument of the Cassini robotic spacecraft mission
- Vivekananda Institute of Medical Sciences, a medical institution & hospital in Kolkata, India
