= Vijayanagara Sri Krishnadevaraya University =

State University in Karnataka

- Type: Public
- Established: 2010; 16 years ago
- Affiliations: UGC, NAAC
- Chancellor: Governor of Karnataka
- Vice-Chancellor: M. Muniraju
- Location: Ballari, Karnataka, India
- Campus: Rural
- Website: vskub.ac.in

Vijayanagara Sri Krishnadevaraya University, Ballari, (VSKU) is a public university established in 2010 by the Government of Karnataka in Ballari district of Karnataka, India through the Karnataka State Universities Act, 2000. It has been named after Krishnadevaraya, former emperor of the Vijayanagara Empire. VSKU previously was a post graduate center of Gulbarga University, Kalaburagi and later become independent university in the year 2010. Recently VSKU has celebrated its Decennial ceremony on 27 July 2020.

VSKU has jurisdiction of three districts: Ballari, Koppal and Vijayanagara district. It has three post graduate centers, the main campus Jnana Sagara is at Vinayaka Nagar, Ballari which is spread at about 95.37 acres, houses all the key administrative departments of the university as well as 19 post graduate departments with 21 post graduate programmes. Among three post graduate centers one of the center is located at Nandihalli in Sandur tehsil of Ballari district which currently offers 10 post graduate programs. Another two campuses were started at Koppal (Established in 2016) and Yelburga (Established in 2017) tehsil, both in Koppal district, offering 10 and 7 post graduate programs respectively.

== Departments of Pure Sciences and Technology ==
- Department of Biochemistry
- Department of Biotechnology
- Department of Botany
- Department of Chemistry
- Department of Industrial Chemistry
- Department of Computer Science
- Department of Mathematics
- Department of Physics
- Department of Zoology

== Departments of Social Sciences and Humanities ==
- Department of History and Archeology
- Department of Political science
- Department of Sociology
- Department of Journalism and Mass communication
- Department of MSW

== Departments of Language Studies ==
- Department of English

== Post graduate centers ==
- Post Graduate Center Koppal(PGCK)
- Post Graduate Center Nandihalli (PGCN) Sandur
- Post Graduate Center Yelburga (PGCY)

== Library ==
The Library was established in University campus in 2010.

== See also ==
- Education in Ballari
