= Education in Ballari =

Most of graduate education in Ballari city, Karnataka, India falls under the jurisdiction of Vijayanagara Sri Krishnadevaraya University and Visvesvaraya Technological University. Educational institutions in the city include:

- Vijayanagar Institute of Medical Sciences
- Vijayanagara Sri Krishnadevaraya University (VSKU), Ballari
- Taranath Ayurveda College
- Government Polytechnic, Ballari
- Sanjay Gandhi Polytechnic
- V.V.S. Polytechnic in Kolagal Road
- Teacher's Training Institute, Ballari
- Shree Medha Degree College
- St. Philomena's High School & Good Shepherd Convent

Founded in 1885. In 1901, a technical class was run at the high school by the nuns of the Order of Good Shepherd, and the pupils were almost all Europeans or Eurasians.

- St. Joseph's High School, Ballari
- St. John's High School & Junior College, Ballari
- Wardlaw Composite Jr. College

Founded as a school in 1846 by Rev. R S Wardlaw, D.D. of the London Mission, and raised to second grade college in 1891. For a long time, it was the only Arts college in the Ceded Districts. In 1903-04 it had an average daily attendance of 319 students, of whom 17 were in F.A.Class. This is the oldest educational institution in the Bellary town and continues to offer education to the people of Bellary to date. Prof. U. R. Rao of ISRO studied in this institute.

- Maddikera Bhimayya Sonta Linganna [M.B.S.L] High School
- Bala Bharati Vivekananda High School
- London Mission Telugu Primary School
- Municipal Junior College, Ballari

This school on Ananthapur Road is over 150 years old. One of the oldest institutions in the town, it was started as a composite school for students from the Class IV elementary to Class VI form school final with English as the medium of instruction along with other languages like Telugu, Kannada and Urdu, besides ancient languages such as Sanskrit, Arabic and Persian.
John Neale was the first headmaster of the school, followed by eminent people such as Arcot Ranganath Mudaliar, T. D. Logan, Arcot Bheemachar, K. S. Vedantham, B. Madhava Rao, and Bahadur S. Seshagiri Rao. The foundation for the present building on Anantapur Road was laid on 16 July 1926 by R. G. Grieve, Director of Public Instruction, Government of Madras when Nagaruru Narayana Rao was the chairman of the Bellary Municipality

- Moulana Abul Kalam Azad High School (MAKA High School)

The Municipal High School was bifurcated in the 1950s and the Municipal Muslim High School, was later renamed Moulana Abul Kalam Azad High School. Janaab Meer Mohammed Hussain became the headmaster of the new school.

- Bellary Institute of Technology and Management (formerly Bellary Engineering College)
- Kendriya Vidyalaya, Ballari in Cowl Bazaar
- Heerada Sugamma Model Higher Primary School
- Shettra Gurushantappa Junior College
- Veerasaiva College (Arts, Commerce & Science)

The V. V. Sangha established the premier non-governmental educational institutions in Hyderabad-Karnataka/Bellary district, starting with Veerasaiva college in 1945.

- Kotturswamy College of Education
- Allam Sumangalamma Memorial Women's College
- Vunki Sannarudrappa Law College
- Rao Bahadur Y. Mahabaleshwarappa Engineering College (formerly Vijayanagar Engineering College)
- Togari Veeramallappa Memorial College of Pharmacy
- Kittur Rani Chennamma Girl's High School
- V.V. Sangha's Polytechnic
- Allum Karibasappa Institute of Management (formerly Vijayanagara Institute of Management)
- Pupil Tree School
- Dream World School
- Nandi School & College
- Sri Chaithanya School and College
- Nalandha School and College
- Bellary Residential School and College
- ICFAI University, Ballari in Moka Road
- Basavarajarajeswari Public School and College
- Sri Matha College
- Sathyam Group of Institutions
- SSS Govt. First Grade College
- Ashirvaad School
- Vasavi School
- Vyana Vidyalaya, Ballari
- BEST School and PU College

Bellary Educational Service's Trust, generally known as BeST School.
