= National Expert Group on Vaccine Administration for COVID-19 =

Indian advisory committee to provide guidance related to COVID-19 vaccination

- Abbreviation: NEGVAC
- Legal status: Active
- Location: India
- Region served: India
- Leader: V. K. Paul

National Expert Group on Vaccine Administration for COVID-19 (NEGVAC) is an expert committee constituted by the Ministry of Health and Family Welfare (MoHFW), India to provide advice and guidance on all aspects of COVID-19 vaccination. The committee is also responsible for prioritisation of population groups in the country, deciding procurement and inventory management procedure, selection and delivery of vaccines etc.

== Committee ==
NEGVAC was constituted in mid-2020 and first met on 12 August 2020. is chaired by member (Health), NITI Aayog, and co-chaired by the secretary of MoHFW. The committee has representative secretaries from:

- Vinod Kumar Paul
- Department of Expenditure
- Department of Biotechnology
- Department of Health Research
- Department of Pharmaceuticals
- Ministry of Electronics and Information Technology
- Members representing five state governments
- Technical experts

Members include Samiran Panda, head of the Epidemiology and Communicable Diseases division in ICMR.
