= J. S. Guleria =

Indian general physician and cardiologist (1927/1928–2026)

- Born: 1927 or 1928; Manjara, Punjab Province, British India
- Died: 22 January 2026 (aged 98)
- Occupations: General physician Cardiologist
- Children: Randeep Guleria; Sandeep Guleria; Neeru Guleria
- Awards: Padma Shri

Jagdev Singh Guleria (1927 or 1928 – 22 January 2026) was an Indian general physician and cardiologist who was the Dean and Professor of the All India Institute of Medical Sciences, New Delhi. He was the senior consultant of General Medicine at Sitaram Bhartia Institute of Science and Research and an Emeritus Professor of the National Academy of Medical Sciences. He received the fourth highest Indian civilian honour of the Padma Shri in 2003.

== Life and career ==
After graduating in medicine (MBBS) in 1953 and completing his master's degree (MD) in 1957 from Punjab University, Guleria secured a DM in cardiology from the All India Institute of Medical Sciences Delhi (AIIMS) in 1962 to join AIIMS as its faculty to start his career. He was on duty at AIIMS when former Indian Prime Minister Indira Gandhi was brought to AIIMS after being shot at by militants in October 1984, and attended to the former Prime Minister before she was declared dead. He headed the AIIMS Ethics Committee which investigated the irregularities at AIIMS, including the charges leveled against the then Director of the institution, Panangipalli Venugopal. He was one of the two doctors, the other being K. K. Malhotra, delegated to examine Jayaprakash Narayan during his incarceration in the Emergency period.

Guleria, an elected fellow and Emeritus Professor of the National Academy of Medical Sciences, has delivered many orations including the S. K. Malik Memorial Oration of the Post Graduate Institute of Medical Education and Research (PGIMER) in 1998. He was associated with the Health For All (HFA) initiative of the World Health Organization and presented the lead paper at the fourteenth session of the South East Asia Advisory Committee on Health Research at Colombo in 1998. He was a Fellow of American College of Chest Physicians (FCCP) (1962), Indian Academy of Medical Sciences (FAMS) (1971), and the Indian College of Chest Physicians (FICCP) (1981) and one of the founder fellows of Indian College of Physicians. The Government of India awarded him the civilian honour of the Padma Shri in 2003. The All India Institute of Medical Sciences Delhi honoured him with Lifetime Achievement Award in 2014. Guleria's sons, Randeep Guleria, a pulmonologist with AIIMS, is also a winner of Padma Shri, and Sandeep Guleria, a surgeon, is also a winner of Padma Shri.

Guleria died on 22 January 2026, at the age of 98.
