= Moslem Bahadori =

Iranian medical scientist (1927–2022)

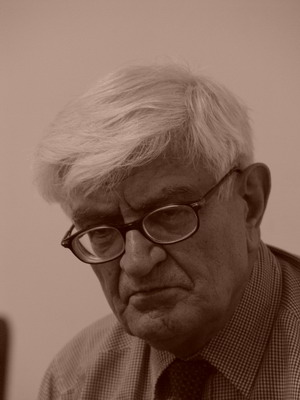
Bahadori

Moslem Bahadori (Persian: مسلم بهادری; 22 January 1927 – 21 April 2022) was an Iranian medical scientist, pathologist, and a university lecturer. In 1973, Bahadori along with Averill Abraham Liebow, reported the first case of plasma cell granuloma, a benign tumor of the lung.

== Education and career ==
Bahadori studied medicine at medical school, Tehran University (1954), and specialized in pathology at the Department of Pathology, Tehran University (1957). He did his post-graduate studies at Cardiff University (1959).

Bahadori was an expert on Cardiopulmonary pathology. Bahadori was one of the youngest faculty members of Tehran University who has been promoted to full professorship. He was also an invited lecturer and Fulbright Visiting Professor at the University of California San Diego.

He was also a member of the Iranian Academy of Medical Sciences and Chairman Section on Basic Medical Sciences. Prof. Bahadori was a member of editorial boards of several scientific journals, including American Journal of Cardiovascular Pathology and Archives of Iranian Medicine.

Bahadori devoted his life to developing basic and clinical medical sciences in Iran and the development of scientific Persian language. His role in developing modern medicine in Iran and medical education was significant.

He was a representative of Iran in the World Health Organization (WHO). Bahadori was Emeritus Professor of the School of Medicine, Tehran University.

== Awards ==
- Iran's Eternal Figure
- Permanent member of Iranian Academy of Medical Sciences

== See also ==
- Iranian science
- Intellectual movements in Iran
- S. Amin Tabish
