= Translational Health Science and Technology Institute =

- Established: 2009
- Key people: Gagandeep Kang (Former-Executive Director)
- Location: Faridabad, India

Translational Health Science and Technology Institute (THSTI) is a society registered under the Societies Registration Act XXI of 1860. It is also an autonomous institute of the Department of Biotechnology, Ministry of Science and Technology, Government of India. It was set up in 2009 at Gurgaon and is now located in NCR Biotech Science Cluster, Faridabad along with the Regional Center for Biotechnology, Advanced Technology Platforms Center, Small Animal Facility, and Bio-incubator. Envisioned by former secretary of DBT, M. K. Bhan, the centre was created to enable faster transition of lab research to market. Pramod Garg is the executive director of THSTI.

THSTI has six intramural centers namely Vaccine & Infectious Disease Research Centre (VIDRC), Pediatric Biology Centre (PBC), Centre for Bio-design & Diagnostics (CBD), Centre for Human Microbial Ecology (CHME), Policy Centre for Biomedical Research (PCBR), and Drug Discovery Research Centre (DDRC).

Vaccine & Infectious Disease Research Centre (VIDRC) is engaged in development of technologies pertaining to prophylaxis, treatment and diagnosis of infections caused by JEV, DENV, HIV, Rotavirus, Mycobaterium tuberculosis, HEV. In 2009, HIV Vaccine Translational Research (HVTR) laboratory was established in collaboration with International AIDS Vaccine Initiative, USA for developing efficient immunogens to be used in immunogenic composition against HIV. The laboratory works in collaboration with the US-based Scripps Research Institute, New York-based Weill Cornell Medical College, Amsterdam-based Academic Medical Center, and Johannesburg-based National Institute of Communicable Diseases. In collaboration with Department of Biotechnology, Bharat Biotech International Limited, PATH and CHRD-SAS, VIDRC was also engaged in the phase III randomized, double-blind placebo controlled trial to evaluate the non-interference in the immune response of three doses of ORV 116E (Rotavac) to antigens contained in childhood vaccines and to assess the clinical lot consistency of three production lots.

It also has one partnership center named Population Science Partnership Centre (PSPC) with the Centre for Health Research and Development, Society for Applied Studies (CHRD-SAS) and one extramural center named Clinical Development Services Agency (CDSA)to facilitate development of affordable healthcare products for public health diseases.

== Scientists at THSTI ==
Executive Director

- Dr. Pramod Garg

Biotechnology Chair

- John David Clemens (Professor, Department of Epidemiology and Founding Director, Centre for Global Infectious Diseases, UCLA School of Public-Health, California)

Visiting Professor of Eminence

- Nirmal Kumar Ganguly
