= Ballari Medical College and Research Centre =

Medical college in Bellary, India

- Former name: Vijayanagar Institute of Medical Sciences
- Type: Government
- Established: 1961; 65 years ago
- Affiliations: Rajiv Gandhi University of Health Sciences
- Director: Dr. B. Devanand
- Location: Cantonment, Ballari, Karnataka, India - 583104, India; 15°9′15.49″N 76°53′47.2″E
- Website: Official Website

The Ballari Medical College and Research Centre, formerly Vijayanagar Institute of Medical Sciences, is a public medical school located in Ballari district, Karnataka. It is run by the Government of Karnataka.

== History ==
The campus of Vijayanagar Institute of Medical Sciences is situated in the former Allipur Jail Buildings. Indian freedom fighters including Sri. Chakravarthi Rajgopalachary, Sri. V.V. Giri, Sri. Bejawada Gopala Reddy, Sri. Ghantasala Venkateshwara Rao, and Sri. Tekur Subramanya were lodged in this jail. This jail was closed in 1958 and the old buildings and entire area of 173 acres (0.70 km^{2}) was handed over by the Government to start the Medical College in Bellary in 1961. To overcome the shortcomings the Medical College was made autonomous Institution "Vijayanagar Institute of Medical Sciences, Bellary" in 1996.

The Medical College Hospital was commissioned in 1966 and has bed strength of 680 beds. The District Hospital is situated in the heart of city and is spread over an area of 15 acres (61,000 m^{2}) and has bed strength of 210 for the pediatrics, Gyanecology and Post Partum Cases. Recently 20 bedded Infosys ward was added for the treatment of Japanese Encephalitis cases. To bring all departments under one roof, for the purpose of better-coordinated teaching and better treatment to the patients even these two departments of Gynaecology and Paediatrics department will be shifted to VIMS campus before the end of this year to the newly constructed wards in the VIMS campus.

Government Wellesly TB & Chest Diseases Hospital was started in 1929 over spacious area of 20 acres (81,000 m^{2}) and has a bed strength of 280 beds. The Urban Health Center in the heart of the City was constructed in 1999 and about 120 to 140 patients are treated as outpatients daily in this center.

The National Medical Commission recognized the undergraduate MBBS course with and annual intake of 100 students in 1977. But due to the shortage of staff and other infrastructure facilities threatened to de-recognise the UG MBBS course in 1997 and immediate measures were taken to fill up the vacancies of teaching posts and to construct the buildings and purchase the equipments required by NMC. And so NMC agreed to continue the recognition of UG courses. The post graduate courses started with permission of NMC in 1980 in different subjects and today 32 candidates for degree courses in 15 subjects, 23 candidates for diploma courses in 9 subjects are admitted every year in this institute.

NMC has recognized PG courses of following subjects – Total No. of PG Seats Available – 53

Anatomy – 1, Physiology – 1, Pathology – 2, Microbiology – 1, Preventive and Social Medicine – 1, Anaesthesia – 2, Dermatology – 1, Paediatrics – 2, General Medicine – 5, Ophthalmology – 1, ENT – 4, General Surgery – 7, OBG – 3, Radiology – 2 .

In the following 7 subjects, the appointment of staff and purchases of the equipments to fulfill the MCI norms are made and MCI has been already requested to inspect these departments and consider for PG courses recognition in these subjects. The 7 subjects are (1) Ophthalmology (2) Skin & STD (3) Anaesthesiology (4) Pharmacology (5) Pathology (6) Paediatrics (7) Orthopaedics. In the remaining subjects the efforts are being made to develop infrastructures and invite the MCI for PG course recognition.

The Super specialty departments like Urology, Plastic Surgery, Paediatric Surgery and Neurosurgery are functioning and they are well equipped with modern equipments for the treatments and operations of the patients. This Institute also offers M.Ch in Urology courses.

The Institute is affiliated to Rajiv Gandhi University of Health Sciences, Bangalore and it is to be mentioned that in all the University examinations more than 80% of the students have passed in the last many years. One student of this college got 15th rank in All India PG entrance examination. All the needy students both men, women are provided hostels and have the separate working women hostel.

This Institute runs its own nursing school for diploma nursing studies with annual admission of 30 students and also 8 school of nursing and two college of nursing private nursing institutes are availing the clinical facilities of different hospital of this institute. General Nurse Midwife (GNM) Course : School of nursing started in 1963 with intake of 12 students. Up to 1995, it was a 3-year, 9 month midwifery course. later it changed course as a 3yrs in 1996-2004. In 2005 curriculum has changed and the duration of course 3 years and internship 6 months under the guidance of Indian Nursing Council and Karnataka State Nursing Council. It is stipendiary course, each student get after submission of bond paper as per 1957 Note 2 Para G Rule 7 they receive Rs.1000/- per month for 3yrs 6 month.

Basic B.Sc Nursing (B.Sc Nsg) : It is started in 2008 with an intake of 20 students and in the next academic year 2009-10 the intake of student is 25. It is running successfully and first batch students has got 100% results out of which one distinction, 16 first class and 3 second class.

Also courses of different para clinical subjects are conducted in this institution and 60 students are admitted every year.

== Recent developments ==
Dr.T.GANGADHARA GOUDA who was appointed as a regular Director of VIMS for a period of three years, was the brain child of the recent construction and developmental drive in the Institution.

== See also ==
- Education in Ballari
