= Adel Mahmoud =

Egyptian-born American doctor (1941–2018)

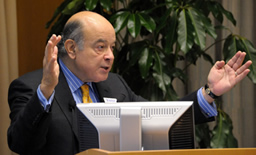
- Adel Mahmoud at Boston University in 2008
- Born: August 24, 1941; Cairo, Egypt
- Died: June 11, 2018 (aged 76); New York City, NY, US
- Occupations: Physician and Research Scientist
- Known for: Assisting in the development of HPV and rotavirus vaccine

Adel K. Mahmoud (August 24, 1941 – June 11, 2018) was an Egyptian-American doctor and expert in infectious diseases. He was credited with helping with the development of the Gardasil HPV vaccine and the rotavirus vaccine while serving as President of Merck Vaccines. Both the HPV and rotavirus vaccines were under development prior to Mahmoud joining Merck Vaccine Division; he assisted in ensuring that they remained a priority for Merck to continue development to commercial launch. After retiring from Merck he became a professor at Princeton University.

== Biography ==
Mahmoud was born on August 24, 1941, in Cairo, Egypt. His father Abdelfattah Mahmoud, who worked as an agricultural engineer, died of pneumonia when Adel was ten. Adel had been sent to buy penicillin, but when he rushed home his father had already died. He was profoundly influenced by the experience. Mahmoud graduated from the Cairo University in 1963 with an MB., BCh. His mother, Fathia Osman, had been accepted by the university's medical school but was prevented from attending by her brother, who thought women should not be doctors.

While a university student, Mahmoud actively participated in politics and served as a leader in the youth movement of President Gamal Abdel Nasser. As the political climate changed, he moved to the United Kingdom to continue his education and earned a Ph.D. from the London School of Hygiene and Tropical Medicine in 1971. In 1973, he emigrated to the United States and became a postdoctoral researcher at Case Western Reserve University in Cleveland, and eventually rose to chair the university's Department of Medicine from 1987 to 1998.

In 1999, Merck & Co. recruited Mahmoud as president of its vaccine division, a position he held until he retired in 2006. At Merck, he oversaw the development of several important vaccines, including the rotavirus vaccine and the HPV vaccine. The former prevents potentially fatal diarrhea for young children caused by rotavirus, while the latter (Gardasil) prevents several cancers, most importantly cervix cancer, caused by the human papillomavirus. His role was considered pivotal as he overcame significant doubt about the viability of the vaccines and succeeded in bringing them to market.

After retiring from Merck in 2006, Mahmoud became a policy analyst at the Woodrow Wilson School of Public and International Affairs of Princeton University in 2007, and a professor at Princeton's Department of Molecular Biology in 2011.

In July 2015, Mahmoud co-authored a paper in The New England Journal of Medicine, titled "Establishing a Global Vaccine-Development Fund", with Jeremy Farrar (a Director of Wellcome Trust) and Stanley A. Plotkin (co-discover of the Rubella vaccine), that led to the founding in 2017 of the Coalition for Epidemic Preparedness Innovations (CEPI).

On June 11, 2018, Mahmoud died from a brain hemorrhage at Mount Sinai St. Luke's Hospital in New York City, at age 76. Microsoft founder Bill Gates lamented the death of Mahmoud on his Twitter account, saying "the world lost one of the greatest vaccine creators of our time. Dr. Adel Mahmoud saved the lives of countless children."

== Family ==
Mahmoud met Sally Hodder, also an infectious-disease expert, at Case Western Reserve in 1976. They married in 1993. He had a stepson, Jay Thornton.

Mahmoud had a sister, Olfat Abdelfattah, and a brother, Mahmoud Abdelfattah. They are both doctors.

== See also ==
- Jian Zhou and Ian Frazer, scientists who invented the technology behind HPV vaccines
