= Vinod Kumar Paul =

Indian pediatrician

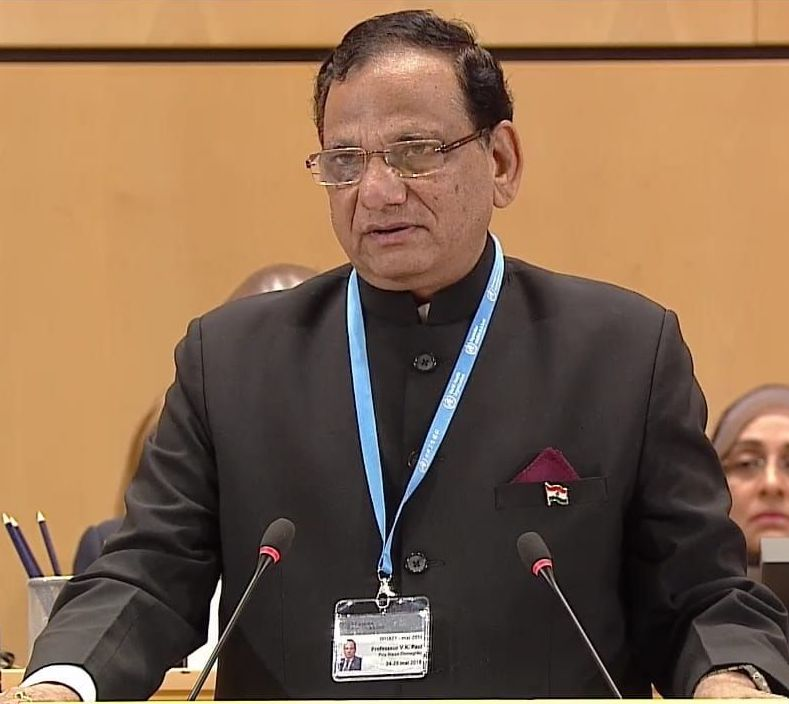
- Vinod Kumar Paul, Member NITI Aayog, Professor AIIMS New Delhi
- Born: August 1, 1955 (age 71)
- Education: All India Institute of Medical Sciences, New Delhi
- Occupations: Member, NITI Aayog, Government of India
- Notable credit(s): Aayushman Bharat, POSHAN Abhiyaan
- Awards: Ehsan Dogramaci Award, B. R. Ambedkar Award for Biomedical Research

Vinod Kumar Paul is an Indian pediatrician and physician scientist currently serving as Member, NITI Aayog. He earlier served as professor of neonatology at the Department of Pediatrics, All India Institute of Medical Sciences (AIIMS), New Delhi from 1985 to 2020. He is associated with India's health policy as well as child and maternal health programs.

In August 2017, he was appointed as a Member of the NITI Aayog where he is in charge of the Health and Nutrition vertical. He has contributed towards formulating the POSHAN Abhiyaan and the Ayushman Bharat Yojana. He served as the Chairman of The Board of Governors of the National Medical Council of India from 2018-2020.

In the wake of the COVID-19 pandemic, Paul chaired the National Task Force on COVID-19 and the Empowered Group on Medical Emergency Management Plan. He also served as Chairman of the National Expert Group on Vaccine Administration for COVID-19 (NEGVAC).

== Early life and education ==
V.K. Paul was born in Hoshiarpur, Punjab and studied in Punjab and Himachal Pradesh. He joined the All India Institute of Medical Sciences where he served as faculty for nearly three decades and as Head of the Department of Pediatrics for nearly a decade.

== Physician scientist ==
V.K.Paul specialized in the field of neonatology. He is associated with capacity building and the scale up of neonatal resuscitation and kangaroo mother care in India. The newborn division at AIIMS headed by him has been a WHO Collaborating Centre for Training and Research since 1997. His research contributes to understanding neonatal sepsis with focus on antimicrobial resistance. He is editor of the 'Ghai Essential Pediatrics', the textbook for undergraduate medical students in India currently into its 9th Edition.

== Public health in India ==
V.K. Paul has been closely associated with India's health policy and programs since 1980. He is credited for conceptualizing the Ayushman Bharat Program, the largest health assurance program of the Government of India. The program aimed at universal health coverage by providing free hospitalization to half a billion people, and by operationalizing 150,000 health and wellness centers providing primary health care. Paul has contributed towards formulating the POSHAN Abhiyaan, the Government of India's overarching scheme to improve the nutritional outcomes for children, pregnant women and lactating mothers. From 2018-2020, Paul was also appointed as the Chairman of the Board of Governors in supersession of the Medical Council of India.

== International health ==
V.K. Paul chaired the Technical Advisory Group on Women's and Children's Health for WHO South East Asia Region (2015) He was co-chair of the board of the Partnership for Maternal, Newborn and Child Health (2010–11).

== Honors and awards ==
The Ihsan Dogramaci Family Health Foundation Prize was conferred on Paul at the World Health Assembly 2018 in recognition of his service in the field of family health.

He is the recipient of the Dr. B. R. Ambedkar Centenary Award for Excellence in Biomedical Research, the highest award of the Indian Council of Medical Research (ICMR).

He was awarded the Himachal Gaurav Award by the Government of Himachal Pradesh (2018). He is a Fellow the Indian National Science Academy (FNA), a Fellow, Indian Academy of Science (FASc), and Fellow, National Academy of Sciences, India, NASI (FNASc) and a Fellow of the National Academy of Medical Sciences (FAMS).
