= Jeremy Farrar =

British medical researcher

Sir Jeremy Farrar OBE FRS FRCP FMedSci
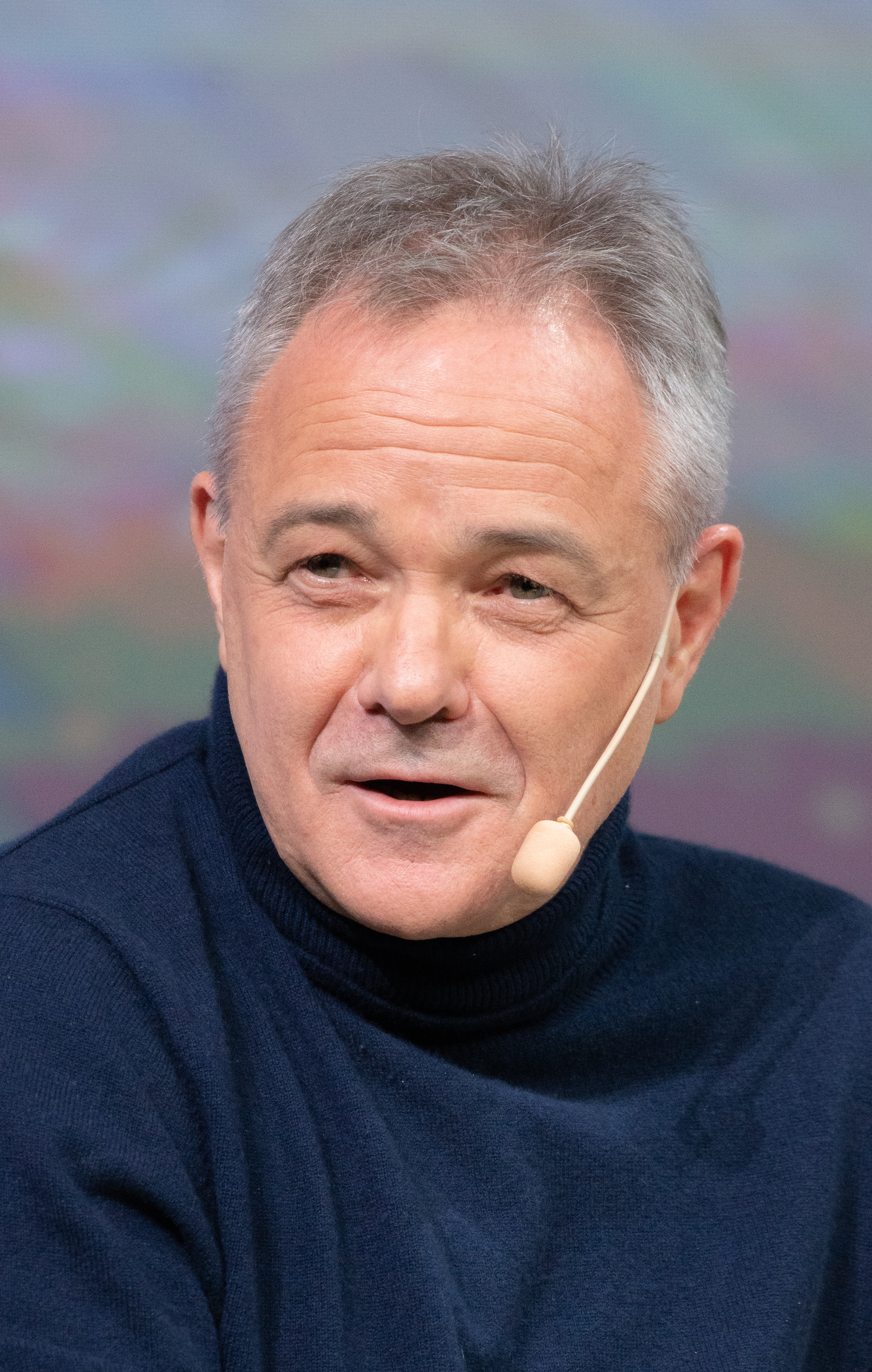
- Farrar at 2024 Nobel Week
- Born: Jeremy James Farrar; 1 September 1961 (age 65); Singapore
- Education: Churcher's College; University College London (BSc, MBBS); University of Oxford (DPhil)
- Spouse: Christiane Dolecek (m. 1998)
- Awards: Order of Ho Chi Minh
- Scientific career
- Fields: Tropical medicine; Infectious disease; Antibiotic resistance
- Workplaces: University of Oxford; Wellcome Trust; World Health Organization; Oxford University Clinical Research Unit (OUCRU); Farrar Foundation
- Thesis: Analysis of combinatorial immunoglobin libraries from a myasthenia gravis patient (1997)
- Website: wellcome.org/about-us/people/sir-jeremy-farrar

Sir Jeremy James Farrar (born 1 September 1961) is a British biologist and medical researcher who has served as Chief Scientist at the World Health Organization since 2023. He was previously the director of The Wellcome Trust from 2013 to 2023 and a professor of tropical medicine at the University of Oxford.

== Early life and education ==
Born in Singapore, Farrar is the youngest of six children in his family. His father taught English and his mother was a writer and artist. Due to his father's work, he spent his childhood in New Zealand, Cyprus and Libya.

Farrar was educated at Churcher's College and UCL Medical School, from where he obtained a Bachelor of Science degree in immunology in 1983 and a Bachelor of Medicine, Bachelor of Surgery degree in 1986. Farrar completed his Doctor of Philosophy degree at the University of Oxford in 1998 on myasthenia gravis.

== Career and research ==
Farrar's research interests are in infectious diseases such as tuberculosis, dengue fever, typhoid fever, malaria, and H5N1 influenza.

=== Career in academia ===
From 1996 until 2013, Farrar was Director of the Oxford University Clinical Research Unit in Ho Chi Minh City. In 2004, he and his Vietnamese colleague Tran Tinh Hien identified the re-emergence of the deadly bird flu, or H5N1, in humans. He was Professor of Tropical Medicine and Global Health at the University of Oxford from 2000 until 2013.

In addition to his academic work, Farrar was part of the Center for Global Development’s Working Group on Priority-Setting Institutions for Global Health in 2012.

=== Wellcome Trust, 2013–2023 ===
In 2013, Farrar was appointed Director of the Wellcome Trust. During his time at the Wellcome Trust, with Chris Whitty and Neil Ferguson, he co-authored an article in Nature titled "Infectious disease: Tough choices to reduce Ebola transmission", explaining the UK government's response to Ebola in Sierra Leone, including the proposal to build and support centres where people could self-isolate voluntarily if they suspected that they could have the disease. In July 2015, he co-authored a paper in The New England Journal of Medicine (with Adel Mahmoud and Stanley A. Plotkin), titled "Establishing a Global Vaccine-Development Fund", that led to the founding in 2017 of the Coalition for Epidemic Preparedness Innovations (CEPI). Together with a number of others, in 2016 he proposed a World Serum Bank as a means of helping combat epidemics.

In addition to his role at the Wellcome Trust, Farrar has served as chair on several advisory boards for governments and global organizations. In 2017, he was part of the selection committee chaired by Jules A. Hoffmann that chose Stewart Cole as director of the Institut Pasteur. From 2017 until 2019, he was a member of the German Ministry of Health’s International Advisory Board on Global Health, chaired by Ilona Kickbusch. In 2019 he served on The Lancet Commission on Tuberculosis, co-chaired by Eric Goosby, Dean Jamison and Soumya Swaminathan. He is also a member of the Health and Biomedical Sciences International Advisory Council (HBMS IAC) at the Agency for Science, Technology and Research of Singapore.

In 2020, he was appointed to the Global Leaders Group on Antimicrobial Resistance, co-chaired by Sheikh Hasina and Mia Mottley. In the preparations for the Global Health Summit hosted by the European Commission and the G20 in May 2021, he was a member of the event's High Level Scientific Panel.

Farrar has served on a number of WHO committees, co-chairing the World Health Organization’s working group on dengue vaccines from 2015 until 2016. Since its inception in 2017, Farrar has been chairing the Scientific Advisory Group of the WHO R&D Blueprint, a global strategy and preparedness plan that allows the rapid activation of research activities during epidemics. From 2018 to 2022, he served on the joint World Bank/WHO Global Preparedness Monitoring Board (GPMB), co-chaired by Elhadj As Sy and Gro Harlem Brundtland. In 2019, he co-chaired a WHO committee evaluating Ebola therapeutics.

Farrar has also served on UK governments committees. In May 2020, amid the COVID-19 pandemic, he was appointed to the expert advisory group for the UK Government’s Vaccine Task Force. He has also served as a member of the UK Scientific Advisory Group for Emergencies (SAGE), led by Patrick Vallance (up to 2 November 2021, when Farrar resigned in disagreement with the government's approach), and Public Health England’s Serology Working Group. During Farrar's time in SAGE, Health Secretary Matt Hancock sought to have him removed from the group following his criticisms of the government's handling of Covid, the abolition of Public Health England (PHE) and the appointment of Dido Harding to head the ineffective and expensive Test and Trace programme.

In July 2021 he published the book Spike: The Virus vs The People, co-authored with Financial Times journalist Anjana Ahuja, giving his account of the UK government's response to the Covid-19 pandemic.

Farrar was listed in Time's 2024 most influential people in health list.

=== Views ===
On 19 February 2020, Farrar, along with 26 other scientists, published a letter in The Lancet titled "Statement in support of the scientists, public health professionals, and medical professionals of China combatting COVID-19'" in which the authors declared, "We stand together to strongly condemn conspiracy theories suggesting that COVID-19 does not have a natural origin."

Farrar wrote an opinion piece in the Guardian on Dec. 4, 2021 stating he feared not enough was being done to vaccinate people in poor nations against COVID-19. Farrar stated, “The longer this virus continues to spread in largely unvaccinated populations globally, the more likely it is that a variant that can overcome our vaccines and treatments will emerge. If that happens, we could be close to square one. This political drift and lack of leadership is prolonging the pandemic for everyone, with governments unwilling to really address inequitable access to the vaccines, tests and treatment. There have been wonderful speeches, warm words, but not the actions needed to ensure fair access to what we know works and would bring the pandemic to a close.”

== Other activities ==
=== Corporate boards ===
- Temasek Holdings, Member of the International Panel

=== Non-profit organizations ===
- National Academy of Sciences (NAS), Member of the Climate & Health Initiative Planning Committee (since 2020)
- Geneva Science and Diplomacy Anticipator (GESDA), Member of the Board of Directors (since 2020)
- Genome Research Limited, Chairman of the Board (since 2020)
- Global Health Innovative Technology Fund (GHIT), Member of the Council (since 2018)
- Coalition for Epidemic Preparedness Innovations (CEPI), Member of the Board and Co-Founder (since 2017)
- Global He@lth 2030 Innovation Task Force, Member of the Advisory Council (since 2015)
- Global Alliance for Genomics and Health (GA4GH), Member of the Strategic Advisory Board (since 2013)
- Aga Khan University, Member of the Board of Trustees
- Forward Institute, Advisor
- Global Research Collaboration for Infectious Disease Preparedness (GloPID-R), Vice-Chair
- Francis Crick Institute, Member of the Board
- Office for Strategic Coordination of Health Research (OSCHR), Member of the Board
- The New England Journal of Medicine, Member of the Editorial Board
- Patan Academy of Health Sciences (PAHS), Member of the International Advisory Board
- UK Collaborative on Development Research (UKCDR), Member of the Strategic Coherence of ODA-funded Research
- Vanke School of Public Health at Tsinghua University, Member of the International Advisory Board
- WHO Collaborating Centre for Modelling, Evolution and Control of Emerging Infectious Diseases, University of Cambridge, Member of the Advisory Board
- WomenLift Health, Member of the Global Advisory Board
- Global Leaders Group on Antimicrobial Resistance, Member (since 2020)

== Awards and honours ==
Farrar is a member of the Royal College of Physicians and a Fellow of the Academy of Medical Sciences. He was appointed Officer of the Order of the British Empire in the 2005 New Year Honours for services to healthcare, especially the prevention of tropical diseases, in Vietnam. His citation on election to the Academy of Medical Sciences reads:

Jeremy Farrar is director of the Wellcome Trust-funded Oxford University Clinical Research Unit. Over the past ten years he has created a remarkable research institute in which his own research productivity has been phenomenal and an impressive training program has been developed. Under his direction the research programme has conducted seminal work on malaria, dengue, typhoid, tetanus, pyogenic and tuberculous meningitis and has become the leading centre for clinical research on avian influenza. These Pivotal clinical and virological studies have identified the dual importance of viral burden and the cytokine response to the lethal pathogenesis of avian influenza, and have described the rapid emergence of resistance to neuraminidase inhibitors. The unit has also conducted important research into Dengue shock syndrome, conducting the only large prospective randomised trials of fluid replacement and has provided an evidence-base for revision of the World Health Organisation classification. His commitment to fighting emerging infectious diseases at their source in developing countries is commendable and his contribution to capacity building in Vietnam and other countries is vital for the future of health care in these regions and serves as a model for others to follow.

Farrar was elected a Fellow of the Royal Society in 2015. He was appointed a Knight Bachelor in the 2019 New Year Honours for services to Global Health.

== Personal life ==
Farrar has been married to Christiane Dolecek, an Austrian-born typhoid researcher, since 1998. They have three children and live in Oxford. Since 2011, the family has focused on providing educational assistance to youth from Vietnam and Nepal.

Cultural offices
Preceded by Mark Walport	Director of the Wellcome Trust; 2013 – date	Incumbent
