= Randeep Guleria =

Indian pulmonologist (born 1959)

Doctor Randeep Guleria
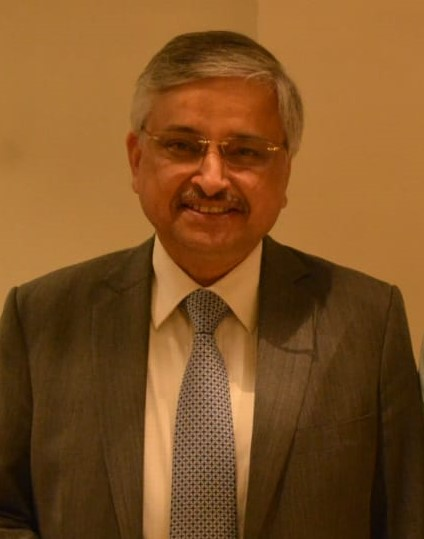

Director at AIIMS, Delhi
- In office 28 March 2017 – 24 March 2022
- Preceded by: M. C. Misra
- Succeeded by: Dr. M Srinivas

Personal details
- Born: 5 April 1959 (age 67) Himachal Pradesh, India
- Education: PGIMER (D.M. Pulmonary Medicine, M.D. General Medicine); Indira Gandhi Medical College (M.B.B.S.)
- Profession: Doctor
- Awards: Padma Shri; Dr. B. C. Roy Award

Randeep Guleria is an Indian pulmonologist and former director of AIIMS New Delhi, credited with the establishment of India's first centre for pulmonary medicines and sleep disorders at AIIMS. He is also the former President of AIIMS Bilaspur. In 2015, he was honoured with Padma Shri, the fourth highest Indian civilian award, by Government of India.

Guleria is co-author of a book Till We Win: India's Fight Against The COVID-19 pandemic. Randeep Guleria is son of Padma Shri Jagdev Singh Guleria, a cardiologist, and is elder brother to Padma Shri Sandeep Guleria, a surgeon.

== Biography ==
An alumnus of the class of 1975 of St. Columba's School, Delhi, Dr Guleria started his medical studies at IGMC, Shimla, affiliated with Himachal Pradesh University from where he received undergraduate degree in Medicine, afterwards he attended the Post Graduate Institute of Medical Education and Research (PGIMER) Chandigarh, from where he secured his MD in general medicine and DM in pulmonary medicine. He joined the All India Institute of Medical Sciences and rose in ranks to become a professor and the head of the department of Pulmonology and Sleep Disorders. He is associated with the World Health Organization (WHO) as a member of its Scientific Advisory Group of Experts (SAGE) on immunization and influenza vaccination. He also serves as a consultant to International Atomic Energy Agency (IAEA), Vienna on issues related to radiation protection.

Guleria was the personal physician to Atal Bihari Vajpayee, former Prime Minister of India since 1998. He is credited with efforts in establishing a centre for respiratory diseases and sleep medicine at AIIMS, which is reported to be a first in India. He is a recipient of Raj Nanda Pulmonary Disease Fellowship from Raj Nanda Trust and the Royal College of Physicians, UK and is an elected fellow (2011) of the National Academy of Medical Sciences (NAMS). He sits on the editorial boards of a number of medical journals such as the Indian Journal of Chest Diseases, Lung India, JAMA: The Journal of the American Medical Association and Chest India.

Randeep Guleria was included by the Government of India in the 2015 Republic Day honours list for the civilian award of Padma Shri.

He has been awarded the prestigious Dr. B C Roy National Awards for the year 2014, under eminent medical person category by the Medical Council of India.

== See also ==
- S. Amin Tabish
- M. Srinivas (medical professional)
- Pulmonology
- Sleep disorder
- All India Institute of Medical Sciences
- International Atomic Energy Agency
