= List of schools in Delhi =

The following is a list of schools in the Indian union territory of Delhi in the National Capital Region.

- Ahlcon Public School, Mayur Vihar
- Air Force Bal Bharati School, Lodi Road
- Air Force Golden Jubilee Institute, Subroto Park, Delhi Cantonment
- The Air Force School, Subroto Park, Delhi Cantonment
- American Embassy School, Chanakyapuri
- Anglo Arabic Senior Secondary School, Ajmeri Gate
- Army Public School, Dhaula Kuan, Delhi Cantonment
- Army Public School, Shankar Vihar, Delhi Cantonment
- Aryabhatta International School, Barnala
- Bal Bhavan International School, Dwarka
- Balvantray Mehta Vidya Bhawan ASMA, Greater Kailash
- Bluebells School International, Kailash Colony
- The British School, Chanakyapuri
- Carmel Convent School
- Col. Satsangi's Kiran Memorial Public School, Satbari
- Delhi Public School, Mathura Road
- Delhi Public School, R. K. Puram
- Delhi Public School, Vasant Kunj
- DTEA Senior Secondary School(s)
- Fr. Agnel School, Gautam Nagar
- Free School Under the Bridge, East Delhi
- Greenfields Senior Secondary School, Dilshad Garden
- Guru Harkrishan Public School
- Hamdard Public School, Sangam Vihar
- Hans Raj Model School, Punjabi Bagh
- Harcourt Butler Sr. Sec. School, Mandir Marg
- Industrial Training Institute, Arab Ki Sarai
- Japanese School, New Delhi, Vasant Kunj
- Kendriya Vidyalaya Janakpuri, Janakpuri
- K. R. Mangalam World School
- Kulachi Hansraj Model School
- Lady Irwin School, Canning Road/Defence Colony
- Lycée Français International de Delhi, Chanakyapuri
- Manav Sthali School, New Rajinder Nagar
- Modern School, New Delhi
- The Modern School ECNCR, New Delhi
- Mount Carmel School, Anand Niketan
- Mount St. Mary's School, Delhi Cantonment
- Navy Children School, Chanakyapuri
- Queen Mary's School, Rohini
- Rajkiya Pratibha Vikas Vidyalaya, Shalimar Bagh
- Raisina Bengali Senior Secondary School, Gole Market, New Delhi
- Ramjas School, Pusa Road, New Delhi
- Salwan Public School, Rajendra Nagar
- Sanskriti School, Chanakyapuri
- Sardar Patel Vidyalaya, Lodi Estate
- The Shri Ram School
- South Delhi Public School, Defence Colony
- Springdales School
- St. Columba's School, New Delhi
- St. Francis De Sales School, Janakpuri
- St. Paul's School, Safdarjung
- St. Thomas' School, Mandir Marg, New Delhi
- St. Xavier's Senior Secondary School, Raj Niwas Marg
- St. Xavier's School, Rohini
- Syed Abid Husain Senior Secondary School, Jamia Nagar, Okhla
- Tagore International School, New Delhi
- Union Academy Senior Secondary School, Raja Bajar
- Vasant Valley School, Vasant Kunj
- Zabaan School for Languages

== See also ==
- List of schools in Delhi affiliated with CBSE
