= List of schools in Delhi affiliated with CBSE =

This is a list of schools located in Delhi in the National Capital Region and affiliated with the Central Board of Secondary Education (CBSE). The schools in Delhi are mostly affiliated with CBSE. But some schools prefer the ICSE board.

- Balvantray Mehta Vidya Bhawan ASMA
- Delhi Public School, R. K. Puram
- Kendriya Vidyalaya Janakpuri
- Lawrence Public School
- Modern School, Barakhamba Road
- Sardar Patel Vidyalaya
- South Delhi Public School
- St. Paul's School, Delhi
