= Asola =

Asola may refer to the following :

== Places and jurisdictions ==
- Asola, Lombardy, in the province of Mantua, northwestern Italy
  - its collegiate cathedral Sant'Andrea was the 'see' of a single-parish Abbey nullius of Asola (1509-1818)
- Asola (Delhi), in the district of South Delhi in the state of Delhi
- Asola, Vantaa, a district of Vantaa, Finland

== People ==
- Giammateo Asola (died 1609), Italian composer
