= Rajkiya Pratibha Vikas Vidyalaya, Shalimar Bagh, Delhi =

Rajkiya Pratibha Vikas Vidyalaya, Shalimar Bagh
- Rajkiya Pratibha Vikas Vidyalaya, Shalimar Bagh, Delhi

Location
- B.T. Block, Shalimar Bagh, Delhi; 110088; India
- Coordinates: 28°42′17.3″N 77°09′33.4″E

Information
- Type: Government
- Motto: "Committed Towards Excellence"
- Established: 2001
- School district: North West - A
- School code: 1309124
- Principal: Mr. Ravindra Singh Rawat (H.O.S.)
- 1st Principal: Mr. S.S. Singhal
- Grades: VI-XII
- Enrollment: 686
- Campus type: Urban
- Website: www.edudel.nic.in

Rajkiya Pratibha Vikas Vidyalaya (RPVV) Shalimar Bagh is one of the 21 RPVV schools established as a system of alternate schools for gifted students in Delhi. The school is known for its outstanding result and considered as one of the best government school in Delhi. The school is run by the Directorate of Education, Delhi, under the Department of Education, Government of NCT of Delhi. RPVV Shalimar Bagh is a co-educational school affiliated to Central Board of Secondary Education (CBSE), New Delhi, with classes from VI to XII standard. The school was established in the year 2001. The founding principal of the school is Mr. S.S Singhal.

== Location and campus ==
RPVV Shalimar Bagh Building

RPVV, Shalimar Bagh is situated in Shalimar Bagh in North West Delhi, 10 km from the main campus or north campus of the University of Delhi. It has a large green area with four lawns and three playgrounds, one well equipped auditorium with a capacity of more than 800 people, a library with a collection of more than 10,000 books and subscription to major newspapers and magazines. The school has laboratories for sciences, social sciences, mathematics, and home science. A special maths zone is developed with help of "heymath.com", equipped with modern technology.

== School Magazine ==
Parichay,"परिचय" the annual school magazine covers events organized by the schools, photographs of meritorious students and also features students' articles, poems, and jokes. It is published in Hindi, English and Sanskrit.

== National Cadet Corps (NCC) ==
The school also has an active group of NCC students. There are two NCC wings in school, NCC Boys Wing and NCC Girls Wing. NCC cadets participate in different activities around the year and also attend Annual and combined annual training camps organised by the authorities.,

== tGELF ==
RPVV, Shalimar Bagh is a member of the Global Education & Leadership Foundation (tGELF). tGELF gives training of leadership skills and ethics to the students.

== Annual day ==
The school celebrates its annual day in February, with different cultural programs and prize distribution to meritorious students and the release of its annual magazine 'Parichaya'.

== Ranking ==
The school is ranked sixth in India amongst the Government schools, in a survey conducted by C-Fore for Outlook (magazine).

== See also ==
- List of schools in Delhi
