= Priyanka Joshi =

Biochemist

- Education: University of Pune; University of Cambridge
- Scientific career
- Fields: Biochemistry
- Workplaces: University of California, Berkeley; University of Cambridge

Priyanka Joshi is a biochemist who is a research fellow at University of California, Berkeley, where she studies calorie restriction and its effect upon lifespan. Previously, she was an Everitt Butterfield research fellow at Downing College, Cambridge, where she worked at the university's Centre for Misfolding Diseases studying the metabolic precursors which influence the aggregation of proteins such as amyloid beta, which are thought to cause Alzheimer's disease. In 2018, she was listed in the Forbes "30 under 30" list of innovators in science and healthcare and the Vogue 25 list of influential women in Britain.

== Early life and education ==
Joshi was born in Delhi, India in 1988. She went to Mount Carmel School in Delhi and then studied for a MSc in biotechnology at Savitribai Phule Pune University before gaining a PhD at the University of Cambridge in chemistry. She was awarded the Salje Medal for Best PhD in Science by Clare Hall, Cambridge in 2015.

== Career ==
During her PhD, Joshi created a library of small molecules which were the starting point for a drug screening program at the Centre for Misfolding Diseases, University of Cambridge.

Following completion of her PhD, Joshi continued her research at the University of Cambridge as a postdoctoral research fellow of Downing College. There she worked on small molecules in the body, such as metabolites, and their potential role in preventing protein aggregation in the brain.

Joshi has also been involved in public engagement work with school students in India. She helped create the Science Outreach to Schools (SoS) initiative which has run workshops on science experiments for students.
