= Ziya Us Salam =

Indian author

- Born: 1970 (age 55–56); Rampur, Uttar Pradesh, India
- Education: St. Stephen's College
- Occupations: Author, critic, journalist, social commentator
- Years active: 1995–present
- Notable work: Inside the Tablighi Jamaat

Ziya Us Salam (born 1970) is an Indian author, literary critic, journalist and social commentator, who has been working for The Hindu Group since 2000. In addition to serving as the associate editor for magazine Frontline, he also wrote several columns on sociocultural issues and book reviews for the magazine.

Born in Rampur, his father was Islamic scholar Mufti Abdul Dayem Sahab (died 1983) while his mother is a housewife. Following his study at St. Stephen's College, he decided to work as a journalist in 1995. He has worked for several newspaper, including The Hindu, The Pioneer, The Statesman and The Times of India. He is also an advisory board member of Muslim Mirror.

== Biography ==
Salam was born in Rampur in Uttar Pradesh in 1970. His father, Mufti Abdul Dayem Sahab, an Islamic scholar, had written several scholarly works on Islamic sciences in Urdu and Arabic and also worked as a hadith translator, while his mother is a housewife. Salam has a sister, who works as a doctor. He and his family later moved to Delhi. He started his formal education at the Bluebells School International until the tenth grade and later at a convent school. Salam pursued his undergraduate study in History from St. Stephen's College affiliated to the University of Delhi. Following this, he started his career as a journalist in 1995. Recalling his childhood, he said: "When I was in grade V, I used to scribe the handwritten notes from different columns of the newspapers. After compilation, I used to distribute the Photostat copies of my notes among the friends in my colony at Lajpat nagar. I was in grade VII when first of my article was published."

Throughout his career, Salam has worked as a journalist for different newspapers. He has been working as a Features Editor for The Hindu's north India edition for more than 16 years and serves as an associate editor at the Frontline magazine. He published his first book on Islam, titled Till Talaq Do Us Part: Understanding Talaq, Triple Talaq and Khula, which discusses about marriage in Islam, in 2018. The Wire described it as a "slim, lucid volume" and a "timely intervention", which would "hopefully succeed in its objective of clearing many misconceptions about the issue that has seen wide disjunction between the scriptures and practice." He published another book in 2018, Of Saffron Flags and Skullcaps: Hindutva, Muslim Identity and the Idea of India. With a foreword by Nirmala Lakshman (the director of The Hindu Group), the book discussed about discrimination against Muslims in India. Writing for Frontline, the Aligarh Muslim University professor Mohammad Sajjad observed how Salam "rightly concludes his book on an optimistic note".

== Bibliography ==
- Salam, Ziya Us (2015). Delhi 4 Shows - Talkies of Yesteryear. Om Books International. ISBN 978-9380070261.
- Salam, Ziya Us (2018). Of Saffron Flags and Skullcaps: Hindutva, Muslim Identity and the Idea of India. SAGE Publications. ISBN 978-9352807369.
- Salam, Ziya Us (2019). Lynch Files: The Forgotten Saga of Victims of Hate Crime. SAGE Publications India. ISBN 978-9353282196.
- Salam, Ziya Us (2019). Story book for kids: 365 Tales from Islam. Om Books International. ISBN 978-9352764051.
- Salam, Ziya Us (18 October 2019). Women in Masjid: A Quest for Justice. Bloomsbury Publishing. ISBN 978-93-88912-03-7.
- Salam, Ziya Us; Parvaiz, Mohammad Aslam (12 February 2020). Madrasas in the Age of Islamophobia. SAGE Publications. ISBN 978-93-53289-31-7.
- Salam, Ziya Us (18 July 2020). Nikah Halala: Sleeping with a Stranger. Bloomsbury Publishing. ISBN 978-93-89611-49-6.
- Salam, Ziya Us (30 August 2020). Shaheen Bagh: From a Protest to a Movement. Bloomsbury Publishing. ISBN 978-93-90077-94-6.
- Salam, Ziya Us (2020). Inside the Tablighi Jamaat. HarperCollins India. ISBN 978-9353579272.
- Salam, Ziya Us (2020). Short Stories from Islam. Om Books International. ISBN 978-9353763794.
