= Asola (Delhi) =

- Town
- Location in Delhi
- Coordinates: 28°27′27″N 77°11′18″E
- Country: India
- State: Delhi
- District: South

Population (2011)
  - Total: 16,000

Languages
  - Official: Hindi, English
- Time zone: UTC+5:30 (IST)
- Postal code: 110074
- Vehicle registration: DL 3C

Asola-Fatehpur Beri is a census town in the South Delhi district of Delhi, India. It is best known for the Asola Bhatti Wildlife Sanctuary. The town comprises two villages, Asola and Fatehpur Beri, including their extensions.

== Demographics ==
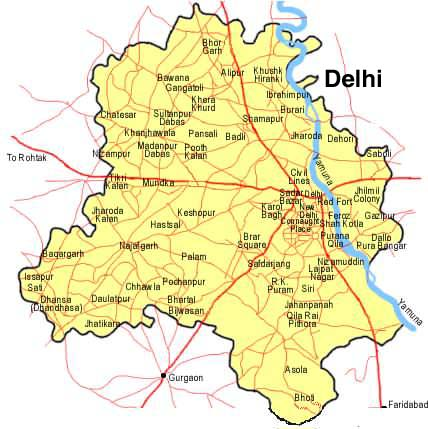
Map of Delhi showing location of Asola

As of 2001 India census, Asola had a population of 5,002. Males constitute 56% of the population and females, 44%. Asola has an average literacy rate of 66%, higher than the national average of 59.5%; 61% for males and 39% for females. 17% of the population is under 6 years of age.

== Notable people ==
- Kanwar Singh Tanwar, politician and Member of Parliament from Amroha constituency
- Kartar Singh Tanwar, politician
- Brahm Singh Tanwar, politician

== See also ==
- Chandan Hola
- Dera
- Col. Satsangi's Kiran Memorial Public School
