= Lady Irwin School =

Girls' school in New Delhi, India, established 1927

Coordinates: 28°37′12.7″N 77°13′25.5″E

- Motto: Dhiyo yon-ah prachodyath
- Founder: Shri Satish Ranjan Das
- Established: 1927; 99 years ago
- Mission: Making quality education available under the same roof to all the children
- Formerly called: Lady Irwin Higher Secondary School
- Address: Lady Irwin Sr. Sec. School Shrimant Madhav Rao Scindia Marg, New Delhi - 110001.
- Location: Shrimant Madhav Rao Scindia Marg, New Delhi, Delhi, India
- Website: www.ladyirwinschool.org

Lady Irwin School for Girls is an educational institution in New Delhi, India, established in 1927. It is a composite English medium school from class I to class XII affiliated to the Central Board of Secondary Education (CBSE), New Delhi. It has a nursery section.

The school has two branches - primary and senior. The school is housed in three separate buildings viz. primary at Defence Colony and middle and secondary at Canning Road, New Delhi.

== General ==
The Lady Irwin School for Girls was established in 1927, under the leadership of the late Shri S. R. Das, the Law Member of the Viceroy's Executive Council, for the purpose of making education available under the same roof to all the children of Central Government servants. Since the Summer Capital those days was located at Simla, a branch of Lady Irwin School was first opened in Simla. A branch was later opened in New Delhi so that students did not suffer any inconvenience when the government servants moved to Delhi, which was the Winter Capital. The school building at Simla, which is considered to be a heritage building, today houses the DalZiel Hotel.

The higher secondary School at New Delhi was and still is located at the erstwhile Canning Lane, now called Madhav Rao Scindia Marg, just off what was then known as Curzon Road, now called Kasturba Gandhi Marg. The middle school was housed in the Army barracks on Canning Lane just across what was then Pataudi House. The Army Barrack has since been demolished and the middle school is now housed in another building on Canning Lane which was constructed by funds raised by annual PT Shows organized at the National Stadium through the 1960s and 1970s by the students and teachers of Lady Irwin School.

There are 3200 students in the New Delhi branch of the school and 120 staff members.

Through the 1960s and 1970s, the Central Board of Secondary Education Merit List was dominated by the students of Lady Irwin School.

== Houses ==
The School has six houses, identified by a colour and are named after the daughters of Mother India:

- Maitreyee - Blue,
- Gargi - Indigo,
- Lilawati - Green,
- Laxmibai - Violet,
- Sanghamitra - Yellow,
- Ahilyabai - Red.

The six house colours are the colours of the Rainbow. Saffron, a shade of orange, is the school colour.

== Motto ==
The school's motto is Dhiyo yon-ah prachodyath i.e. "Let our faculties flourish in the realization of the Supreme". The emblem is a lotus, the color of the school is saffron.

The school publishes a yearly school magazine Uditi.

== Notable alumni ==
- Madhavi Mudgal, Indian classical dancer known for her Odissi dance style. Her awards include the Sanskriti Award, 1984, President of India's award of Padma Shri, 1990, the Orissa State Sangeet Natak Akademi Award, 1996, Grande Medaille de la Ville by Govt. of France, 1997, Central Sangeet Natak Akademi Award, 2000, Delhi State Parishad Samman, 2002 and the title of Nritya Choodamani in 2004.
- Saswati Sen, exponent of Kathak, an Indian classical dance form. She is a senior disciple of Pandit Birju Maharaj. She achieved fame by dancing in Satyajit Ray's film, Shatranj Ke Khilari (1977), his invocation of Lucknow society at its "Paris of India" zenith. She teaches Kathak in Kalashram in Jorbagh in New Delhi. Saswati Sen mostly teaches and performs with her Guru Birju Maharaj.
- Poonam Gupta, Scottish-Indian entrepreneur and philanthropist. She was appointed Officer of the Order of the British Empire (OBE) for her services to the business and charity in the 2017 New Year Honours.

== See also ==
- List of schools in Delhi
