= St. Francis De Sales School (New Delhi) =

Location
- A-4C Janakpuri; New Delhi; India; 28°37′27.48″N 77°4′47.64″E

Information
- Type: Private, Coeducational
- Motto: Knowledge, Service & Charity
- Religious affiliation: Roman Catholic (MSFS)
- Patron saint: St. Francis DeSales
- Established: 9 April 1978; 48 years ago
- Founder: Fr. Thomas Thoomkuzy
- Principal: Fr. Anthony Amaladoss
- Faculty: 87
- Grades: Lower 1 - 12
- Enrollment: 2800
- Campus: Urban
- Area: 3.91 acres (15,800 m^{2})
- Nickname: SFS
- Publication: The Quest
- Affiliation: CBSE
- Houses: Akbar; Ashoka; Chanakya; Pope Paul
- Former pupils: Fransalians
- Website: www.sfsdelhi.com

St. Francis de Sales School, also known as Francis de Sales or SFS, is a co-educational private English Medium school in New Delhi, India. Privately funded and independent, it was founded in 1978 by Fr. Thomas Thoomkuzy. The school is a recognized Christian minority private institution run by the Missionaries of St. Francis de Sales and affiliated to the Central Board of Secondary Education.

== History ==
The school was established on 9 April 1978 by Father Thomas Thoomkuzy. The foundation stone for the building was laid on 9 July 1977 by Shri Sikandar Bhakt, the Union Minister for Works and Housing. The foundation stone was blessed by his Excellency Rt. Rev. Dr. Luciano Storero, the Apostolic nuncio to India. This is the first school in Delhi that has implemented the technology of closed circuit television in its classrooms, named "Vidya Darpan".

The school started with 117 students and had a humble beginning in tents. The high school (grades 9-10) began in the 1982-83 school year, and the first batch of 61 students appeared for their 10th class Board exams in 1983–84. The school was upgraded to Senior Secondary (grades 11-12) the same year.

In April 1982, the foundation of the Hindi medium section (extended section) aimed at providing formal academic education in the afternoon to children from the weak and underprivileged segments of society was started with a batch of 50 students belonging to classes from kindergarten through second grade. In 1993, the extended section was upgraded to class 10 and in 1995 the first batch of students appeared for their CBSE examinations.

In 2002, the School celebrated its silver jubilee after completing 25 years. The school has been consistently ranked among the top schools in West Delhi.

== Academic curriculum and educational policy ==
The school is affiliated to the Central Board of Secondary Education and its students appear for the AISSE (Class 10 CBSE Board), AISSCE (Class 12 CBSE Board) exams respectively. The school follows the CBSE curriculum with text-books and study material approved by the board. The Fransalian Educational policy draws inspiration from the Gospels, teachings of the church, patron St. Francis de Sales and the founder Fr. Peter Marie Mermier. The Fransalians have also been guided by the report "A Pastoral plan for Catholic Schools", and "The National Policy on Education", visualizing the need of the hour and the changing modern trends in educational philosophy.

== Clubs ==
- Quiz Club
- The Eco Club-"Haritima"
- Debate Club
- Astronomy Club
- Science Club
- Media in Education
- Dance Club
- Art Club
- Western music Club
- Indian Music Club
- Robotics Club

== Extra curricular activities and events ==
There are various extra curricular activities in work experience and art education subjects which are available and taken up by the students including Yoga, Creative Reading, Embroidery, Karate, Scouts & Guides, Electrical Gadgets, Instrumental Music, Indian Music, Western Music, Indian Dance, Home Science, Social Work, Interior Decoration, Street Play, Pottery, Drawing, Public Speaking and Journalism among others.

The Fr. Peter Mermier Football Tournament is hosted by the school and has participation from schools across Delhi. It is an important tournament in the school calendar with many prominent school teams from outside participating and the SFS football team competing in it. The school also organizes a Cross-Country race across West Delhi, for its students, to run for a cause and spread social awareness. According to the school Principal the main purpose behind organizing this annual event is to encourage mass participation and to sensitize the students on an environmental issue.

The school has an annual school fair called the Bal Mela comprising eateries, game stalls by students and amusement rides. It also holds a Parent's-day function annually to present different programs by the students.

== Principals ==
- Fr. Agnelo Fernandes (1978–1983)
- Fr. Joseph Pottemmel (1983–1985)
- Fr. A. M. Sebastian (1985–1991)
- Fr. Mathew Thayil (1991–1994)
- Fr. Joseph T. P. (1994–2001)
- Fr. Jacob Karamakuzhyil (2001–2008)
- Fr. Melroy Almeida (2008-2012)
- Fr. Anil George (2012-2018)
- Fr. Anthony Amaladoss (2018 onwards)

== Alumni ==
Sahoday is the alumni association of St Francis De Sales School, New Delhi. An elected Executive committee and Working team composed of ex-students from various batches take care of the functioning of Sahoday.
