= St. Xavier's School, Rohini =

St. Xavier's School, Sector 26, Rohini

Location
- Shahbad Daulatpur, Sector 26, Rohini, Delhi; India; 28°40′18″N 77°13′22″E

Information
- Type: Private primary and secondary school; Christian Minority school
- Religious affiliation: Catholicism
- Denomination: Jesuits; Congregation of Jesus sisters
- Established: 1966; 60 years ago
- Authority: Board of Education, Delhi Administration
- Principal: Fr. Anil Kispotta, S.J.
- Language: English
- Affiliation: Central Board of Secondary Education
- Website: www.xaviersrohini.edu.in

St. Xavier's School, Rohini is a private Catholic primary and secondary school, in Shahbad Daulatpur, located in Sector 26, Rohini, Delhi, India. It was established in 1966, and managed by the Jesuits since 1990. The Christian-minority English medium school is coeducational, recognized by the Board of Education Delhi Administration, and is affiliated to the Central Board of Secondary Education (CBSE), with science, commerce, and humanities streams.

== History ==
The school at Shahbad Daulatpur, Rohini, Delhi, was started in 1972. The Jesuits took over the management of the school in 1990, when it became affiliated with St. Xavier's Senior Secondary School, Delhi. The new building was completed on 1 May 1998 and the school has grown to include close to 4,000 students. The Rohini campus includes a junior school, vocational training, and a National Institute of Open Schooling (afternoon tutorial). The Loyola Vocational Institute is mainly for high school dropouts and has eight hundred students; remedial tutorial classes are held for children attending local government schools. The school was graded an "A star institution" by the Times News Network. It enjoys the administrative assistance of the Congregation of Jesus (CJ) sisters since 2006.

== Activities ==
These include Student's Council, excursions, eco club, inter-house competitions, yoga, annual day, theatre club, sports day, inter-school competitions, parents day, and other celebrations. The school uses the house system where houses compete for points and each January activities culminate with a sports day where a trophy is awarded to the winning house.

Facilities include: grass playing fields, gymnasium, activities and yoga room, audio-visual room, auditorium, music room, and labs for science, computers, mathematics, and English language.

== See also ==
- List of Jesuit schools
- List of schools in Delhi
- List of schools in India
- Violence against Christians in India
