= Bal Bhavan International School =

- Dwarka; New Delhi, India

Information
- Type: Co-educational English Medium School
- Motto: Goodness Before Greatness
- Established: 2004
- Founder: Shri G.C.Lagan
- Chairman: Mr. B.B Gupta
- Principal: Mr. Kunal Gupta
- Staff: 170
- Enrollment: 3034
- Campus: 4.03 acres (16,300 m^{2})
- Affiliations: Central Board of Secondary Education
- Website: bbisdw.com

Bal Bhavan International School is a public school located in Sector - 12 of Dwarka, New Delhi, India.

== History ==
Bal Bhavan International School runs under the Lagan Kala Upvan Society founded in 1970.

Its foundation was laid by Shri G.C. Lagan in 2004. During its initial campus planning, the school made special provision for a vast playground, where most outdoor games would be played.

== Ranking ==
In a survey by The Times of India's Times School Survey in 2022, Bal Bhavan International School has been ranked as the 3rd best school in Dwarka in 2022.

According to dwarkadelhi.com it is among top 20 schools in Dwarka.

== Curriculum ==
The school is affiliated to the Central Board of Secondary Education, New Delhi. Class IX and X students are prepared for the All India Secondary School Examinations (AISSE), whereas Class XI to XII students are prepared for the All India Senior School Certificate Examinations (AISSCE).

The Streams of Science, Commerce, Humanities, Computer Science and Mass Media Studies & Media Productions are offered at Senior Secondary Level.

Bal Bhavan International School is Among few schools in Delhi to offer Mass Media Studies & Media Productions stream.

== Sports ==
The school possesses an indoor sports centre of 0.7 acres (2,800 m^{2}) and an outdoor play field of 2.4 acres (9,700 m^{2}). The indoor sports center includes a basketball, volleyball and badminton court, a skating area and table tennis tables. The outdoor play field includes cricket, football and handball courts. The school has introduced shooting also from April'2018.

The cricket tournament is organised by the school in memory of Sh. B. K. Gupta, one of its founding members. Out of 7 Tournaments, 5 are won by Bal Bhavan International School, Dwarka.

Bal Bhavan International School in association with Jawahar lal Nehru Sports Trust participated in INTERNATIONAL UNDER 16 YEARS BOYS CRICKET TOURNAMENT organised by Bradman Foundation and School Sport Australia at Bradman Oval, Bowral, New South Wales, Australia. It also won International School Cricket Premier League, 2014 & became the first & only Indian School to win that tournament which was played in CMS, Lucknow.

== Notable alumni ==
Yash Dhull played for RCB franchise in 2024 and 2025 (born 11 November 2002) is an Indian cricketer. He made his first-class cricket debut for the Delhi cricket team in the 2021–22 Ranji Trophy in February 2022, scoring two centuries on debut as an opening batsman. He has played for the India national under-19 cricket team, including in India's winning side at the 2022 ICC Under-19 Cricket World Cup and 2021 ACC Under-19 Asia Cup captaining the side in both tournaments. He was taken to a local academy at Bharati College at the age of 6 before moving to Bal Bhawan school's academy when he was 11 years old under coach Rajesh Nagar.

Anuj Rawat (born 17 October 1999) is an Indian cricketer. He made his first-class debut for Delhi in the 2017–18 Ranji Trophy on 6 October 2017. He made his Twenty20 debut for Delhi in the 2018–19 Syed Mushtaq Ali Trophy on 21 February 2019. He made his List A debut on 4 October 2019, for Delhi in the 2019–20 Vijay Hazare Trophy. He did his schooling at Bal Bhavan International School.

Dinesh Mor (born 10 October 1995) is an Indian cricketer. He made his List A debut on 25 September 2019, for Railways in the 2019–20 Vijay Hazare Trophy. He made his Twenty20 debut on 8 November 2019, for Railways in the 2019–20 Syed Mushtaq Ali Trophy. He made his first-class debut on 9 December 2019, for Railways in the 2019–20 Ranji Trophy. He did his schooling at Bal Bhavan International School.

Maithili Thakur is an Indian singer. She rose to fame in 2017 when she took part in season 1 of Rising Star. Maithili was the first finalist of the show, singing Om Namah Shivaya which gained her direct entry into the final. She came second, losing out by just two votes. Following the show, her internet popularity rose. On YouTube and Facebook her videos now get up to 7 million views. She sings Maithili and Bhojpuri songs including chhath songs and kajris. She also sings a variety of Bollywood covers and other traditional folk music from other states. She did her schooling from Bal Bhavan International School.

Mayank rawat https://www.cricinfo.com/cricketers/mayank-rawat-1079847

Tanishq Chaudhary https://www.imdb.com/name/nm12061468/

== See also ==
- List of schools in Delhi
