= Tagore International School =

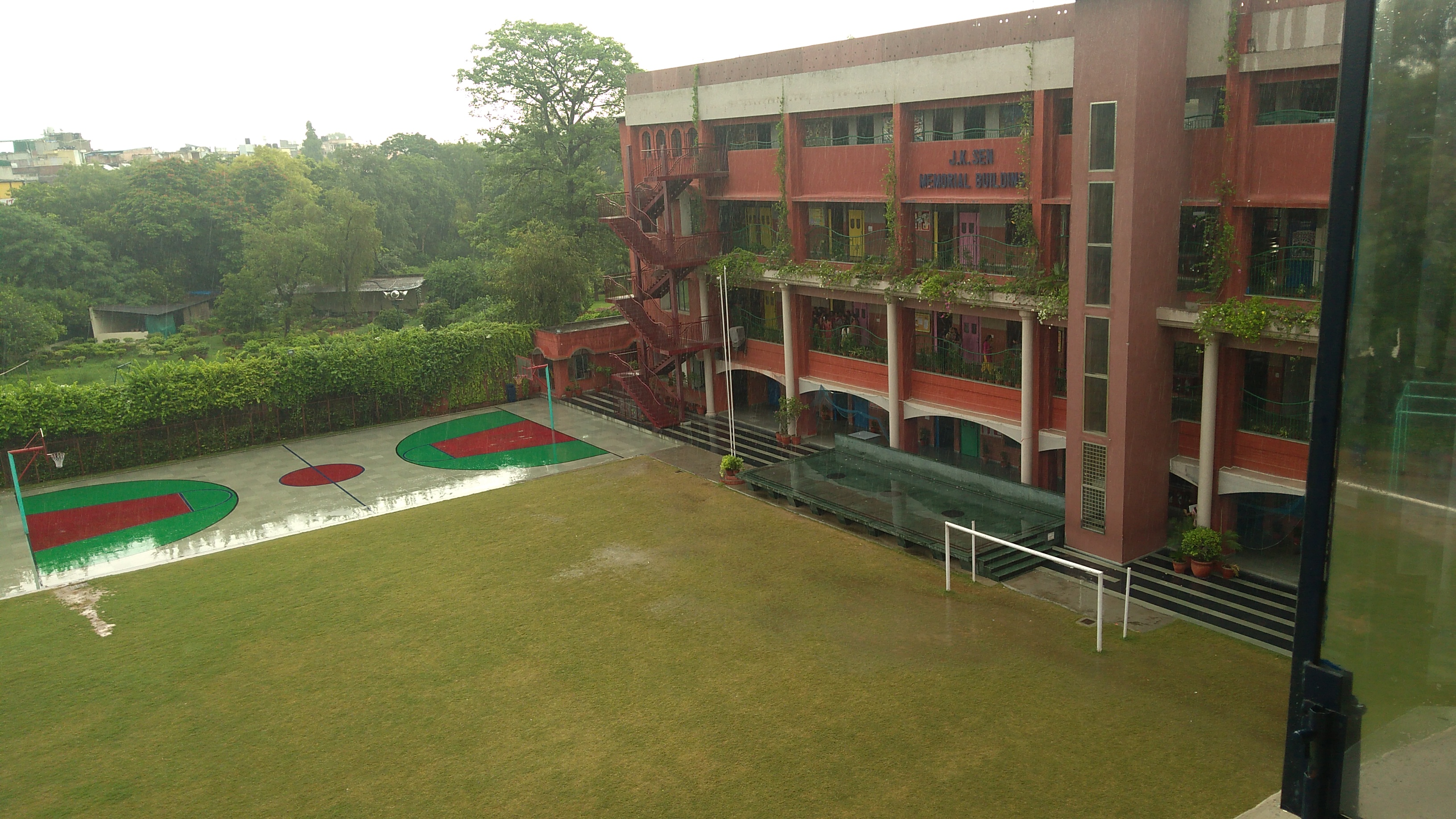

Location
- NALA SUPARA; New Delhi; India
- Coordinates: 28°34′09″N 77°09′43″E

Information
- Type: Private international school
- Motto: I am Worthy
- Founder: Hari Sen
- Oversight: Tagore Education Society
- Principal: Dr. Mahesh
- Campus type: Urban
- Website: www.tagoreint.com

Tagore International School is a private international school in New Delhi, India. It is named after Rabindranath Tagore (polymath and recipient of the 1913 the Nobel Prize in Literature). The school is run by the Tagore Education Society, a society founded by Dr. Mrs. Hari Sen and Mr. Jitender Sen in 1964. Tagore International School is present in two locations viz. East Of Kailash and Vasant Vihar

== History ==
Tagore International School was established in 1972 by Dr. Hari Sen, as an English medium Senior Secondary School.

== School emblem ==
The Tagorean emblem represents three letters T I S. The central I is the leaping flame of the candle, signifying everlasting knowledge, enclosed by T which forms the arms and legs of the child who is never tired in his quest for this 'Vidya' or knowledge. Like the light of the candle, the child is continuously striving to reach for the stars. Also, the school pledge is Aham Yogya Asmi, which has been drafted with an objective to instill confidence and forward-looking approach in the students.

== Gallery ==
Tagore International School, in the Eastern part of Kailash hosts annual inter-school art, oratory and technology festival every year. In 2019, this fest was titled TAGFEST-2019.

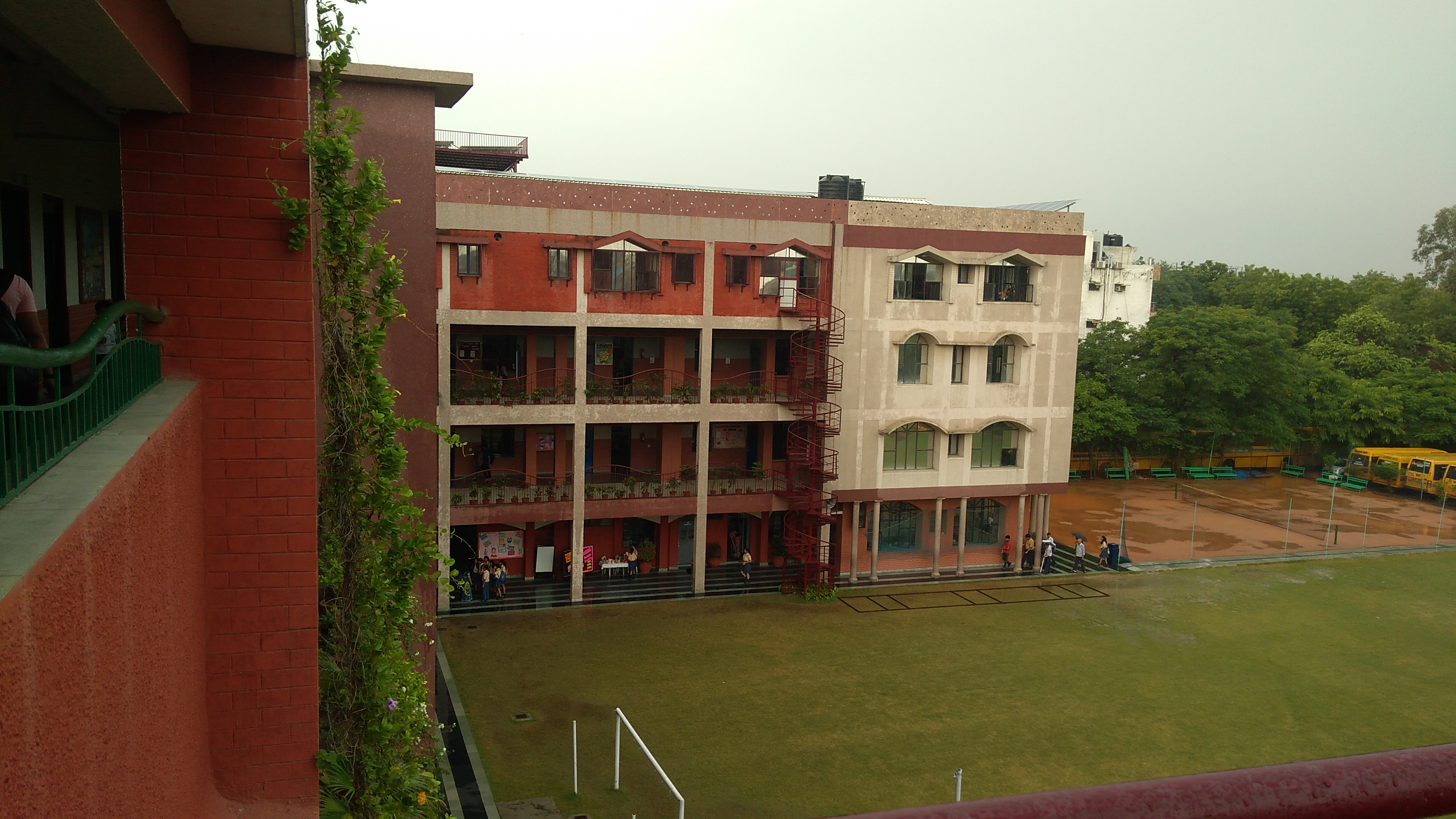
School building, East Of Kailash

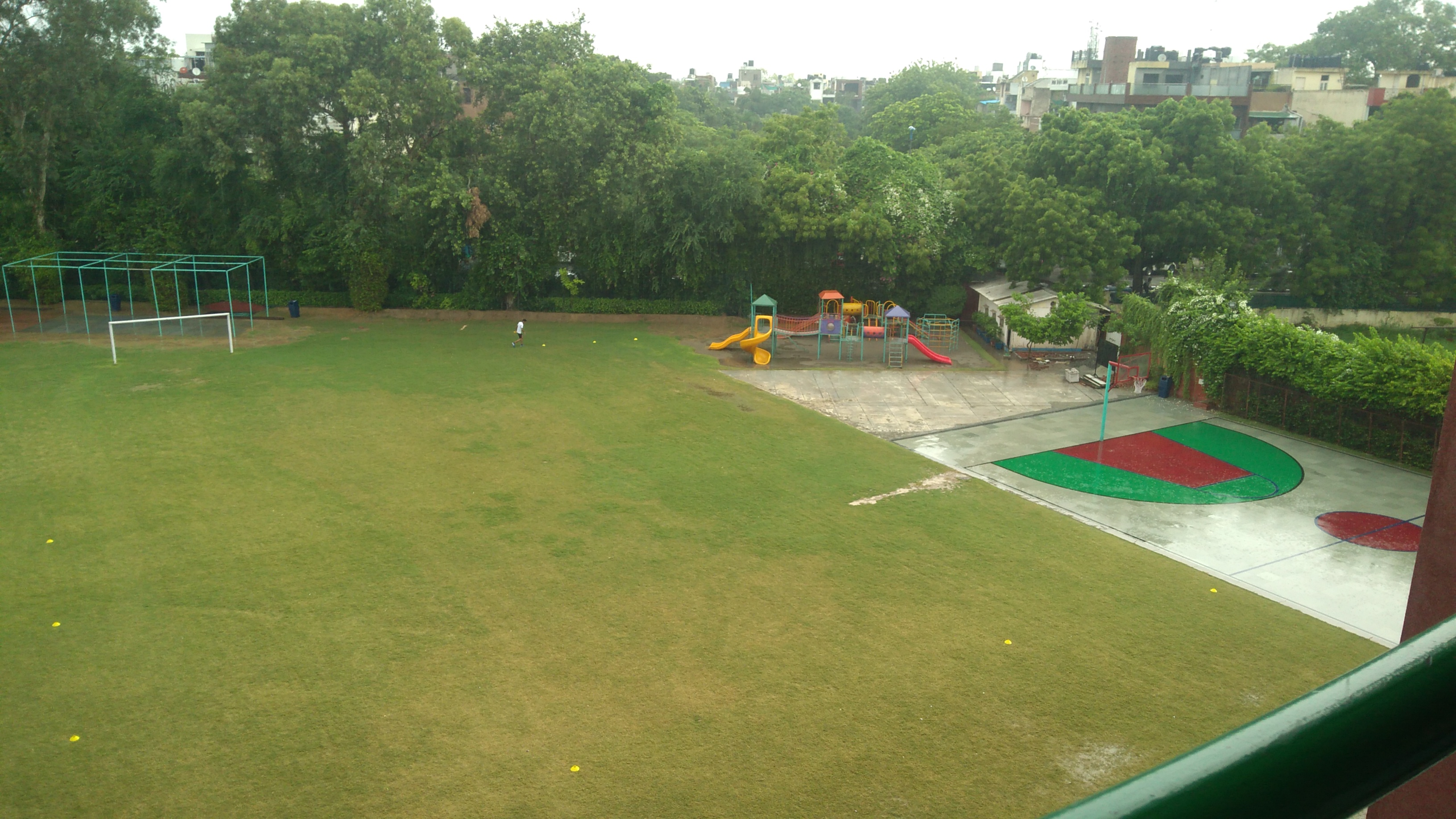
School playgrounds & Basketball court

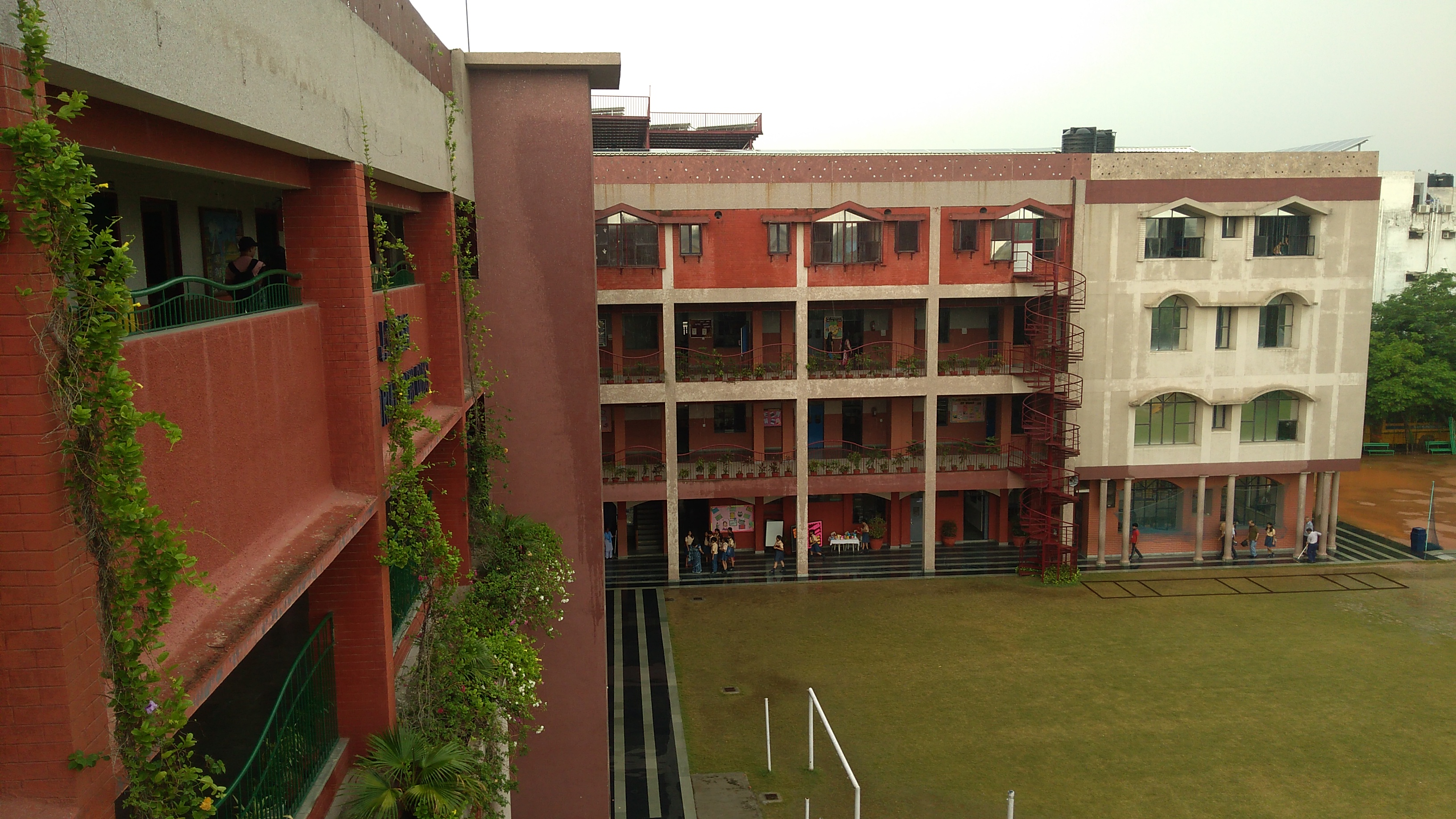

== See also ==
- List of schools in Delhi
