= Greenfields Senior Secondary School =

Greenfields Public School

Location
- New Delhi, Delhi; India; 28.687°N 77.313°E

Information
- Type: Private
- Established: 1966
- Founder: Shri R.R. Joshi
- Status: English Medium
- Principal: S. K. Sharma
- Grades: Kindergarten–12
- Accreditation: Central Board of Secondary Education
- Website: http://www.greenfieldspublicschool.com http://www.greenfieldspublicschool.org

Greenfields Public School, Dilshad Garden, Delhi, India, run by Greenfields Public School Society, is a co-educational senior secondary school with courses in Science, Commerce and Humanities. It is affiliated to the CBSE, New Delhi. It was founded by R. R. Joshi in 1966 at P-11, Navin Shahadara, and has developed into a large institution with nearly 5000 students.

== Staff ==
The Principal and Manager is Dr. vipul sharma with a team of over 200 staff.

== See also ==
- List of schools in Delhi
