= Kailash Colony =

- Neighbourhood of Delhi
- Location in Delhi, India
- Coordinates: 28.5444°N 77.23255°E
- Country: India
- State: Delhi
- District: South Delhi

Languages
  - Official: Hindi
- Time zone: UTC+5:30 (IST)
- Planning agency: MCD

Kailash Colony is a residential neighbourhood in South Delhi, India. Greater Kailash is extension of this place.

== Neighbourhoods ==
Its neighboring areas are Kailash Hills, East of Kailash, Mount Kailash Apartments, Greater Kailash, Lajpat Nagar, Chittaranjan Park and Zamrudpur. Kailash Colony is the oldest area in all of these areas. The National Institute of Open Schooling (NIOS) had its headquarters in this area.

The Apollo Spectra Hospital is a multi-specialty hospital situated in the locality. The Delhi chief minister Rekha Gupta has also inaugurated the SSB Multi Speciality Hospital in the colony.

A statue of Bodofa, the father or guardian of the Bodos, was inaugurated by Home Minister Amit Shah in April 2025. It was also the home of former Union Minister Arun Jaitley.

== Education ==
The following schools are in Kailash Colony:

- Bluebells School International
- Summer Fields School
- Zabaan School for Languages, an Indic language institute
- Oxford Kids Preschool Delhi, Preschool
- Delhi Public School, East of Kailash
