= Dera (village) =

Village in Delhi, India

Dera Dera Gaon / Dera Village
- Census town
- Location in Delhi, India
- Coordinates: 28°25′08″N 77°11′18″E
- Country: India
- State: Delhi
- District: South Delhi district

Population (2011)
  - Total: 16,725
- Time zone: UTC+5:30 (IST)
- PIN: 110074
- Telephone code: 011
- Vehicle registration: DL

Dera, also known as Dera Gaon or Dera Village, is a village and census town located in the Dera Mandi area of South Delhi district, Delhi, India. It is a predominantly Gujjar-dominated village belonging to the Tanwar gotra, known for its cultural heritage and proximity to urban Delhi. The village is situated near Chattarpur and has developed into a mix of residential, commercial, and agricultural land, with a focus on farmhouses and real estate.

== Geography ==
Dera is located in the South Delhi district, within the Aravalli hills extension, near the Delhi-Haryana border and is part of the eco-sensitive zone around the Asola Bhatti Wildlife Sanctuary. It falls under the Mehrauli tehsil, and is adjacent to areas like Chhattarpur, Asola - Fatehpur Beri and Mandi, the region is frequently termed as Dera Mandi collectively to disambiguate from other places with similar name. The nearest metro station is Chhatarpur metro station.

The region spans approximately 16.99 km², featuring a mix of hilly terrain, agricultural fields, and built-up areas. Its proximity to major roads like the Mehrauli-Gurgaon Road and Dera Mandi Road facilitates connectivity to central Delhi and neighbouring states.
