= Chandan Hola =

Village in Delhi, India

Chandan Hola Chandan Hulla
- Village
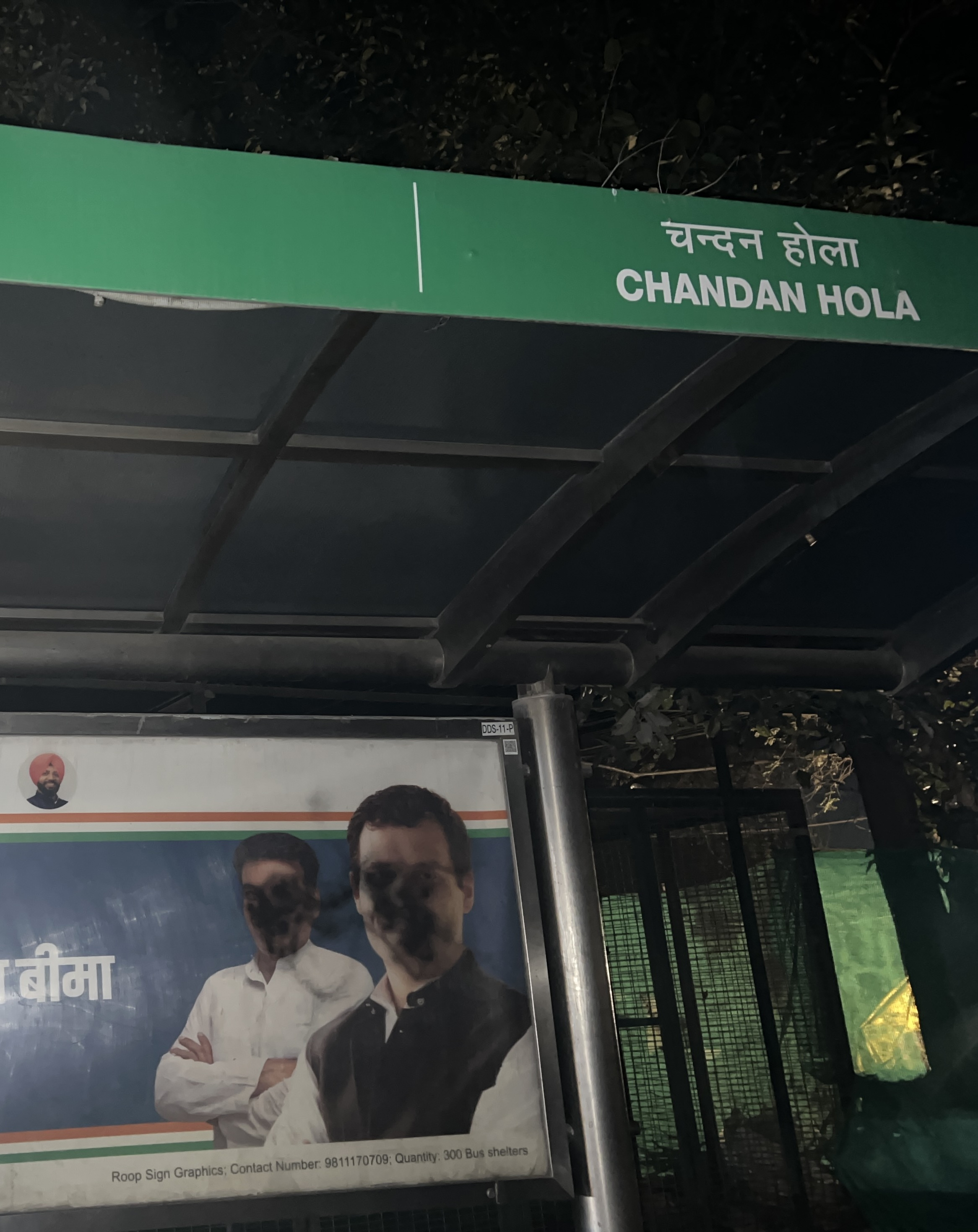
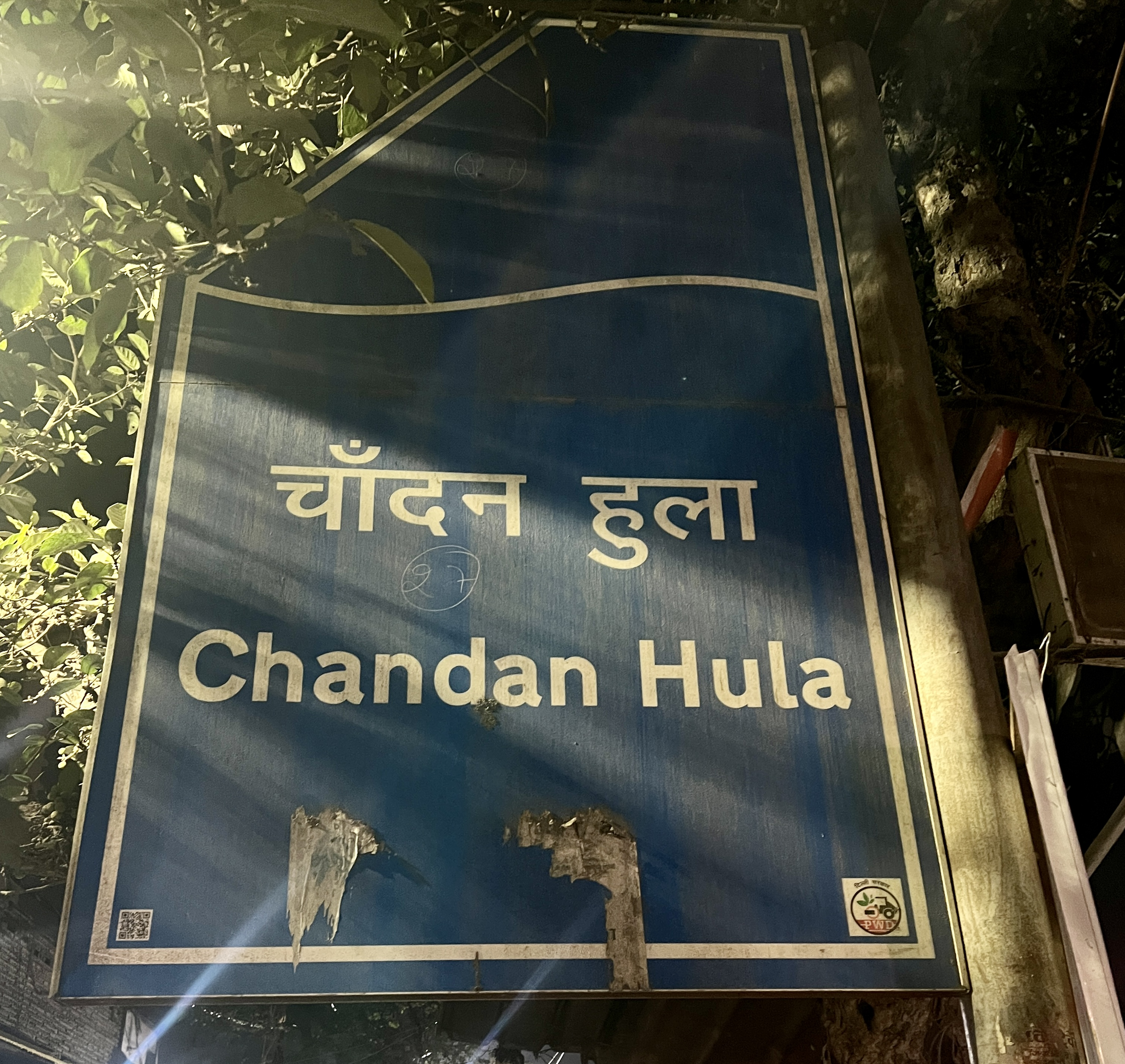
- Chandan Hola bus stand Signboard with a different spelling
- Interactive map of Chandan Hola
- Location within Delhi
- Country: India
- State: Delhi
- District: South Delhi
- Tehsil: Mehrauli

Government
  - Type: State government
  - Body: Delhi Legislative Assembly

Population (2011)
  - Total: 6,780
  - Estimate (2024): 9,400

Languages
  - Official: Hindi, English
- Time zone: UTC+5:30 (IST)
- PIN: 110074
- Civic body: Municipal Corporation of Delhi

Chandan Hola (also spelled as Chandan Hulla) is a village and census town located in Chhatarpur area of South Delhi district in Delhi, India. Its postal code is 110074.

Chandan Hola is one of the twelve villages of the Chhatarpur area in south Delhi. The majority of its residents follow the Islamic religion.

== Origin story ==
Chandan Hola has a origins narrative rooted in local folklore. The village's origins trace back to an ancestor who hunted a deer in Sultanpur of Haryana, and later sought refuge in Satbari village in Mehrauli.

Following a domestic dispute with his wife, Chando, she chose to leave Satbari and live under a peepal tree, rejecting attempts at reconciliation. In response to her wishes, village elders defined the settlement's boundaries, naming it Chandan Hola. Chando is honoured as the village matriarch, and the family of the original settler had three sons, with the fourth foster son associated with the Hindu Gurjar community, which received a portion of the village.

== Demographics ==
According to the reports of the 2011 census of India, Chandan Hola had a population of 6,780 of which 3,723 (55%) were males while 3,057 (45%) were females.

Chandan Hola had an average literacy rate of 73%, lower than the state average of 86.21 %, with male literacy of 82% and female literacy of 62%. 18% of the population was under 6 years of age.

== Connectivity ==
The nearest Metro stations are Chhatarpur and Qutab Minar. Delhi Transport Corporation bus routes 516, 523, 947 and 434 go through Chandan Hola bus stand.

== Notable residents ==
- Yuvraj Singh (cricketer)

== Schools nearby ==
- Col. Satsangi's Kiran Memorial Public School
- Made Easy School, Chhatarpur Campus
