= St. Luke's Church, New Delhi =

St. Luke's Church
- St. Luke's Church
- _type:landmark 28.57003°N 77.227718°E
- Location: B-68, Defence Colony, New Delhi
- Country: India
- Denomination: "Roman Catholic"
- Website: St. Luke's Church in Defence Colony Homepage

History
- Founded: 1979; 47 years ago

Architecture
- Functional status: functional

Clergy
- Priest: Fr. James Peter Raj

St. Luke's Church is a Roman Catholic parish located in Defence Colony B-68, New Delhi, India. It is under the administration of the Archdiocese of Delhi. The building was constructed in 1979.

The Defence Colony was a district set aside for housing armed forces personnel. The original church was built on a vacant residential plot.

The present Parish Priest is Fr. James Peter Raj. Mass is celebrated in English, Hindi, and Malayalam language. Details of Mass timings and other details regarding the Church can be obtained from Homepage.

There are various religious houses and institutions of this parish:

== Religious houses and institutions in the parish ==
Name of the Congregation	Address	Telephone Number
Missionary Sisters, Servants of Holy Spirit	Holy Spirit Convent; B-17 Panchsheel Enclave; New Delhi 110017	26499058
Religious of Mary Immaculate (RMI Sisters)	Yuvati Nivas; M-8, South Extn – II; New Delhi 110049	26251262
Institutions run by R.M.I. Sisters; Hostel for young working girls Social Centre for young domestic workers		26251262
Missionary Society of St. Francis Xavier	Fr, Agnel School, Gautam Nagar; New Delhi 110049	26859283
Fr, Agnel Institutions in Defence Colony Parish; 1) Fr. Agnel School, Gautam Nagar; 2) National Open School Centre, Fr, Agnel School, Gautam Nagar; 3) Fr. Agnel Polytechnic, Gautam Nagar; 4) Fr. Agnel Community Polytechnic, Gautam Nagar		26863286; 26863928 26863286; 26859961; 26526627

== See also ==
- Roman Catholicism in India
