= Industrial Training Institute, Arab Ki Sarai =

Vocational institute in New Delhi, India

Industrial Training Institute - Arab Ki Sarai
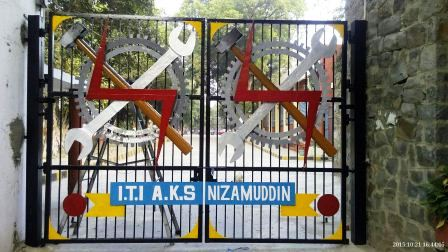
- Former names: Vocation Training Center, Training – cum- Work Center
- Motto: कौशल बलम
- Type: Government Institute
- Established: 1948
- Principal: Shri Sebastian Augusthy
- Academic staff: 92
- Students: 1706
- Location: New Delhi, 110013, India
- Campus: 8 acres (3.2 ha)
- Website: itinizamuddin.delhi.gov.in

ITI Arab Ki Sarai is an industrial training institute in New Delhi, India. It is a government-operated facility that offers one- and two-year training courses for 28 trades. The institute is affiliated with the National Council for Vocational Training and the State Council for Vocational Training.

== History ==
The Government of India, Ministry of Rehabilitation established a Vocational Training Center for displaced persons in New Delhi in 1948. In 1949, its name was changed to Vocational Training – cum- Work Center. The center's originally focused on teaching book binding, leather working, tailoring, weaving, printing, mason, plumbing, and carpentry.

The Ministry of Labour & Employment took on oversight of the center on 22 May 1958. At that time, it was re–named the Industrial Training Institute or ITI.

On 1 March 1961, ITI Arab Ki Sarai was placed under the authority of the Delhi Administration.

== Campus ==
ITI Arab Ki Sarai campus includes 8 acres (3.2 ha) adjacent to Humayun's Tomb in Nizamuddin East, New Delhi. It includes a three-story training building, three workshops, an office building, and a three-story dormitory. The campus includes open parks and a playground.

== Academic ==
ITI Arab Ki Sarai offers one-year and two-year full-time certificates in 28 trades. Some of its trade programs include architecture assistant, computer hardware and network maintenance, draftsman, electrician, electronics mechanic, fashion design, fitter, health sanitary inspector, machinist, mechanic, auto body painting, plumbing, refrigeration and air conditioning technician, sheet metal worker, stenography and secretarial assistant, and welding.

ITI Arab Ki Sarai is affiliated to the National Council for Vocational Training and the State Council for Vocational Training.

== Students and faculty ==
ITI Arab Ki Sarai has 92 faculty members and 1,706 students. Its principal is Shri Sebastian Augusthy.

== See also ==
- List of schools in Delhi
