= Delhi Tamil Education Association Senior Secondary Schools =

School group in Delhi, India

The Delhi Tamil Education Association Senior Secondary Schools are eight secondary schools located in Delhi, India which originated as the Madrasi Education Association school in 1925.

== History ==
DTEA was registered with the Madrasi Education Association (MEA) in 1919 in Shimla by a group of Tamilians working for the British Government who wanted to teach their children traditional Tamil values.

While the first school was being established in 1923, the small community in Delhi raised funds for the second building by way of small voluntary contributions. Today the DTEA consists of seven senior secondary schools with over 7,000 students and 500 teachers.

- 1923: On Vijayadasami Day, the first Madrasi Education Association School was established in Simla, with one teacher and one student.
- 1924: In January, a primary school was opened in New Delhi
- 1925: The school was recognized by the education authority.
- 1931: The school was given accommodation in the municipal school buildings on Mandir Marg (then known as Reading Road).
- 1945: Construction of a new building was started.
- 1946: The higher secondary department was started.
- 1949: The first batch of students appeared for the Delhi Higher Secondary Examination.
- 1950: The Silver Jubilee of the association was celebrated on 5 March.
- 1951: A new primary school at Lodi Estate was opened.
- 1953: Another primary school was opened at Karol Bagh.
- 1955: Construction of a school commenced at the Lodi Estate.
- 1956: The higher secondary classes from Mandir Marg moved to Lodi Estate.
- 1958: A middle school at Lakshmibai Nagar (then known as East Vinay Nagar) was opened.
- 1959: The Mandir Marg School was raised to the status of a higher secondary school.
- 1960: Pandit Jawaharlal Nehru, the Prime Minister laid the foundation stone of the Lakshmi Bai Nagar School.
- 1961: The Moti Bagh Primary School was opened.
- 1962: The Lakshmibai Nagar School was upgraded to higher secondary status.
- 1963: The Karol Bagh School was upgraded to higher secondary level.
- 1964: The primary school at R.K.Puram was opened.
- 1966: The school in Moti Bagh was raised to secondary level.
- 1968: The primary school at R.K. Puram was upgraded to higher secondary level.
- 1970: The school in Moti Bagh was raised to higher secondary level.
- 1972: The name of the association was changed from Madrasi Education Association to Delhi Tamil Education Association (DTEA) and the schools were renamed as DTEA Schools.
- 1975: With due deference to the wishes of the Janakpuri Tamil Association the DTEA formally took over the school at Janakpuri.

== Schools ==
The DTEA runs seven senior secondary schools at Mandir Marg, Lodi Estate, Lakshmibai Nagar, Moti Bagh, Pusa Road (Karol Bagh), R.K. Puram and Janakpuri. An eighth school is being constructed at Mayur Vihar Phase - 3 wherein Delhi Development Authority has allotted a plot measuring 8087 sq. meters

The schools are aided minority institutions, owned and managed by the DTEA at Lodi Estate and ar registered under the Societies Registration Act. The schools, though meant primarily for Tamils, also accept other residents of Delhi.

The schools are affiliated with the Central Board of Secondary Education and are recognized by the Directorate of Education, Government. of N.C.T. of Delhi. Six languages, English, Tamil, Hindi, French, German and Spanish are taught in the seven schools.

.

== Financial situation ==
The school is 100% funded by the Delhi administration and the rest is from annual donations from parents of students.
