= Poonam Gupta =

British Indian entrepreneur (born 1976)

Poonam Gupta OBE
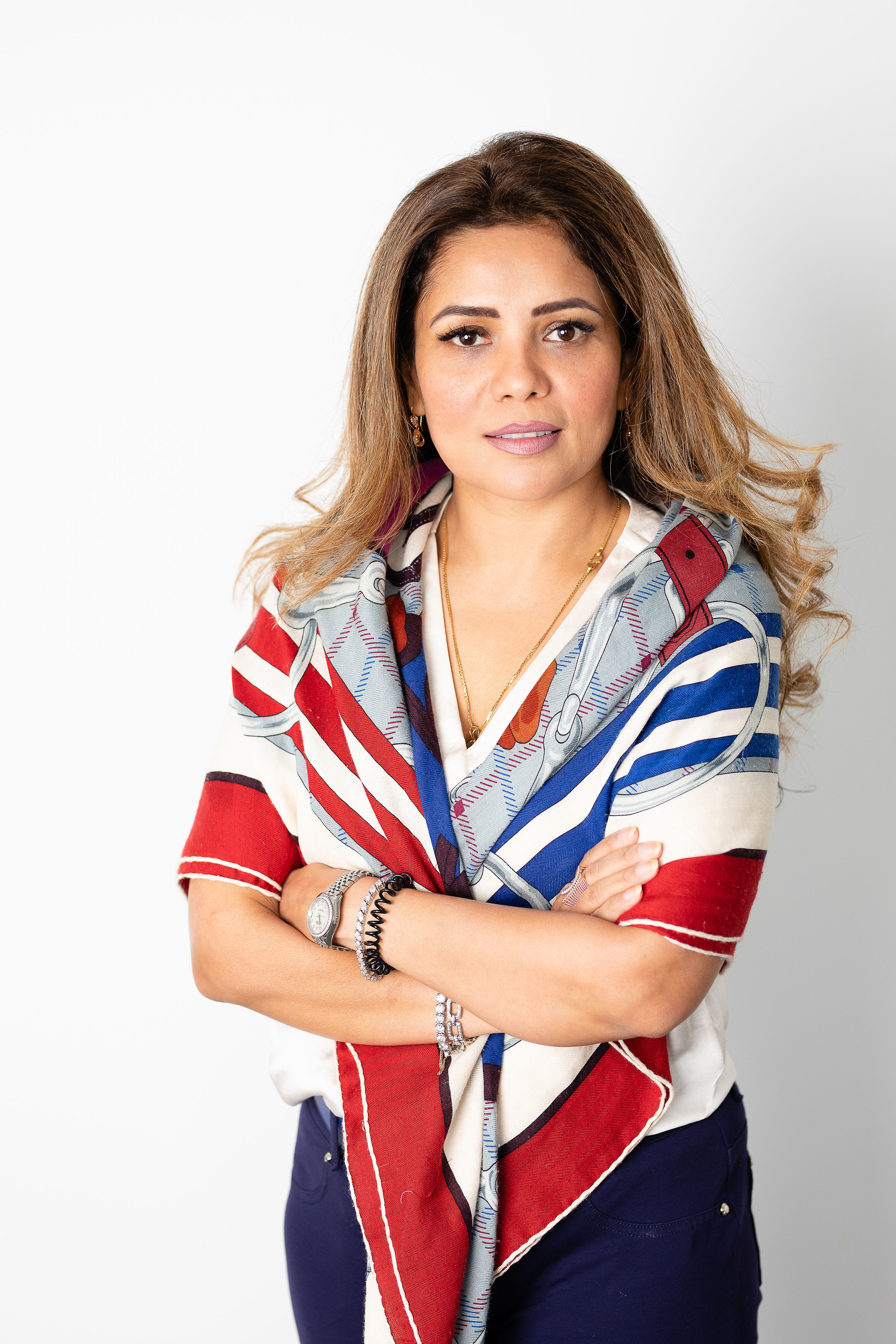

Personal details
- Born: New Delhi, India
- Spouse: Puneet Gupta
- Education: Shri Ram College of Commerce (B.A.); Delhi University
- Occupation: Businesswoman
- Known for: Founder of PG Paper Co., Ltd

Poonam Gupta OBE is a British-Indian entrepreneur, based in Scotland.

== Early life ==
She completed her early schooling years in Delhi at Lady Irwin School and Delhi Public School where she got admission on merit to complete her high schooling. She went on to complete an Honours Degree in Economics from Shri Ram College of Commerce in Delhi before gaining an MBA in International Business and Marketing at Fore School of Management, Delhi and Maastricht School of Management in Holland. In 2022, Gupta was awarded a Ph.D. in International Business and Marketing at Ecole Supérieure Robert de Sorbon. In 2023, she was conferred an Honorary Ph.D. in Business Administration by Glasgow Caledonian University. She arrived in the west of Scotland after marrying Puneet Gupta, a Belfast-born pharmacist of Indian descent. Together they have two daughters. During her second pregnancy, Gupta suffered from a rare form of bone tuberculosis which necessitated her using a wheelchair for 18 months.

== Career ==
Poonam launched her first business PG Paper Company Ltd in 2003 from her family house in Kilmacolm, Scotland.

The business initially specialised in salvaging and reusing products that were often destined for landfill. PG Paper imports and exports goods from over 60 countries around the world and is considered to be the fastest growing paper companies in the United Kingdom.

In 2015, the official headquarters were moved from the family home to the Custom House in Greenock, Scotland.

Gupta is now involved in several other business ventures including PG World, SAPP Holdings, SAPP International, SAPP Property, EnVisage Dental Health and Punav.

She has been recognised as one of the ‘100 Most Influential in UK-India Relations’ by India Inc. Group.

In 2024, Poonam joined The Lion’s Den Show as an investor.

In 2025, Poonam assumed the role of Vice President of the Scottish Chambers of Commerce, Chair of the Manufacturing Sector Committee of the FICCI UK Council and serves as a Lay Member of Court at the University of Stirling.

Poonam Gupta was part of a 125 person delegation who joined Prime Minister Keir Starmer on a two-day trade mission to India in October 2025.

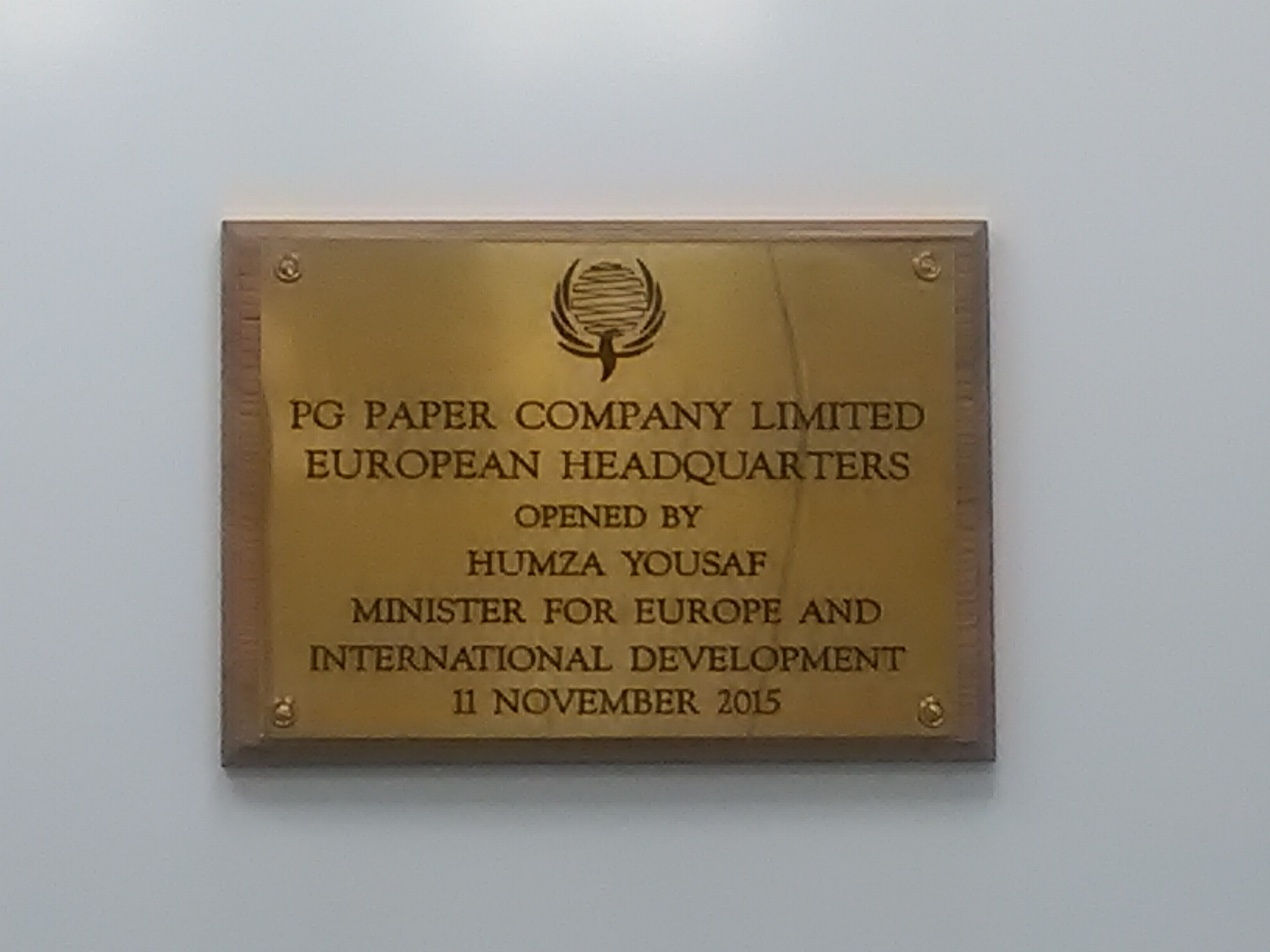
2015 The official Headquarters of PG Paper Company Ltd. Custom House, Greenock, Scotland.

== Philanthropy ==
Gupta's charitable contributions are focused on women's issues, underprivileged children, animal conservation, cancer, gender equality and helping young girls in India to get an education.

In 2015 and 2017, Gupta and her husband Puneet Gupta took part in a rickshaw race to raise funds for Elephant Family, a charity that was founded by the conservationist and Duchess of Cornwall's brother, the late Mark Shand to conserve the Asian elephants.

In 2017, Gupta formed Women's Business Mentoring organization which aims to help Scottish women become successful by providing mentoring schemes across the country.

She contributed to the Virat Kohli Foundation when she placed the winning bid on a painting donated to the cause by the artist Sacha Jafri.

In 2021, Gupta led an India Covid Appeal, providing and delivering over 3,000 oxygen concentrators throughout India during the country's deadly second Covid wave.

== Awards ==
| Year | Awards/Honours/Appointments | Accomplishments |
|---|---|---|
| 2025 | 90-Year Honour: Legacy in International Trade - Chartered Institute of Export & International Trade | Award |
| 2025 | Scots of the Year - 18th Scottish Asian Business Awards 2025 | Award |
| 2023 | Great British Entrepreneur Awards, The Global Entrepreneur of the Year | Winner |
| 2022 | Inspiring Leader of the Year - Women's Enterprise Scotland | Award |
| 2020 | Entrepreneurial Recognition award of the University of Dundee | Award |
| 2019 | Entrepreneur of the Year 2019 UK - Ernst & Young | Winner |
| 2019 | Entrepreneur of the Year for Scotland - Ernst & Young | Winner |
| 2019 | Scale up of the Year Award - Ernst & Young | Winner |
| 2019 | No.1 Magazine Amazing Business Achievement Award | Winner |
| 2018 | Scotland Businesswoman of the Year | Winner |
| 2017 | CEMVO Ethnic Minority Impact Awards - Business Female Award | Winner |
| 2017 | 100 Vibrant faces of British Economy | Honour |
| 2017 | Women Enterprise Scotland | Ambassador |
| 2016 | Officer of the Order of the British Empire | An honorary medal |
| 2009 | Scottish Asian Businesswoman of the Year | Winner |
