= Manav Sthali School =

Location
- R Block; New Rajinder Nagar; New Delhi, Delhi, 110060; India; 28°37′58″N 77°11′01″E

Information
- Type: Private Unaided
- Motto: Foster humanity and compassion
- Opened: 2 October 1957
- Founder: Late Dr. V.K. Bhatnagar
- Status: Active
- Sister school: Bhatnagar International School (Vasant Kunj and Paschim Vihar)
- School board: International Primary Curriculum (IPC for Grade 1-5) Central Board of Secondary Education (CBSE for Grade 1-12)
- Director: Mamta V. Bhatnagar
- Principal: Dipti Bhatnagar
- Gender: Co-educational
- Classes: 1-12
- Average class size: 32
- Language: English
- Campus type: Urban
- Colors: White and green
- Sports: Table tennis, hockey, roller hockey, basketball and volleyball
- Mascot: Genio
- Accreditation: CBSE
- Affiliations: CBSE
- Alumni: Manav Sthalians
- Website: www.manavsthalischool.com

Manav Sthali School is a senior secondary public school in New Delhi, India. Established in 1957 by Late Dr. V. K. Bhatnagar, the school has sports facilities such as hockey, football, cricket, roller skating, athletics and table tennis. It has an auditorium which is the second largest for a school in Delhi.

It is managed by the Manav Shiksa Samiti.

In 1990, its sister institution, Bhatnagar International School in Vasant kunj was founded by Late Dr V.K Bhatnagar, and is run by the Manav Shiksa Samiti.

It has several feeder schools around Delhi led by the same management, such as Kids Way Pusa Road, Manav Sthali Global School in Rajendra Nagar, and Vivek Summit in Patel Nagar, also all run by the Manav Shiksa Samiti.

In 2017, it became the 1st school in Delhi to introduce the International Primary Curriculum along with Manav Sthali Global School, one of the aforementioned feeder schools.

Since 2023, the school has annually organized a set of inter school competitions collectively called Manifestations. Its' events include Sportify (Sports), Perceptions (Languages), Brains and Games (IPC & Primary), Commonomics (Grade 11 & 12 Commerce), Moot Court (Class 11 & 12 Legal Studies), Brainwave (Interschool Science & Maths Quiz)

== Sports ==
=== Table Tennis ===
Manav Sthali houses one-of-the largest table tennis halls in Delhi. The school has been sending out majority State Ranking and National Ranking players over the last 30 years. With an indoor Table Tennis hall with over 15 tables and a robot for dedicated training.

=== Roller Hockey & Skating ===
Manav Sthali school has a dedicated Roller-Hockey skating rink and professional coaches that have trained one of the best Roller Skaters in Delhi. The school has bagged major honours at the Delhi State Roller Sports Championship over the years.

=== Hockey ===
The school has sent numerous hockey teams who bagged honours at the Youth Games/Delhi State Championship organised by Hockey India. Manav Sthali students have also represented country and school at the Pacific school Games in Adelaide. Recently, the school hockey team won the first prize at the Late Daulat Ram Verma Memorial Invitational Inter School Hockey Tournament.

== School Magazine ==
The school releases its publication called "Manav Mirror", a monthly magazine that encapsulates the events and achievements of the students and the school. Since 2024, it has been released digitally through their student portal.

A "Monthly Flash" has also been uploaded on the school's website since 2023

== Notable alumni ==
- Gracy Singh, actress
- Pavan Malhotra, actor
- Pulkit Samrat, actor
- Vikram Bhatnagar, sport shooter
- Saransh Goila, chef on Food Food channel
- Lehar Khan, actress

== See also ==
- List of schools in Delhi
