= Gowri Ishwaran =

Indian educationist

- Born: India
- Occupation: Educationist
- Known for: Sanskriti School, The Global Education & Leadership Foundation
- Awards: Padma Shri

Gowri Ishwaran is an Indian educationist, education consultant and advisor to the Shiv Nadar Foundation. She served as the chief executive officer of the Global Education & Leadership Foundation (tGELF) and is currently the vice-chairperson of the foundation. She is the founder principal of the Sanskriti School, a New Delhi–based co-educational institution.

A post graduate in English literature, she has taught at many institutions such as St. Michael's School, Patna, Springdales School, Delhi and Delhi Public School and has delivered lectures at various seminars and conferences. She is one of the Senior Advisor of the Shiv Nadar Foundation, sits in the advisory board of the Shiv Nadar School and is a member of the Governing Council of the Vedica Scholars Programme for Women, an educational initiative of the Vedica Foundation and Sri Aurobindo Centre for Arts and Communication. The Government of India awarded her the fourth highest civilian honour of the Padma Shri, in 2004, for her contributions to the Indian Educational sector.

== See also ==
- Sanskriti School
- The Global Education & Leadership Foundation
