= South Delhi Public School =

Location
- Defence Colony; Delhi; India; 28.5781883°N 77.2364812°E

Information
- Motto: Work is Worship
- Established: 1966
- Founder: G. S. Rawat
- Principal: Jyotsna Jain
- Faculty: Full time
- Gender: Co-Educational
- Campus type: Urban
- Affiliations: Central Board of Secondary Education
- Website: www.southdelhipublicschool.com

South Delhi Public School is a senior secondary school affiliated to Central Board of Secondary Education (CBSE), Delhi. It is a co-educational day and boarding school.

== History ==
The School was founded in 1966 as a primary school (initially named Sharda Public School) in A-Block, Defence Colony, Delhi by the South Delhi Education Society (Regd.). Encouraged with the performance of the School, in 1968 the School management succeeded in getting 1.378 acre land allotted at the present site. Upgraded as a Middle School (15 July 1972) with recognition from Directorate of Education, Delhi, the Institute shifted to its new semi-constructed premises. The school was upgraded to the Secondary stage in 1982, and then to Senior Secondary stage in 1983.

== Noted alumni ==
- Rahul Verma, social worker and activist; founded the Uday Foundation

== See also ==
- Education in India
- Education in Delhi
- List of schools in Delhi
- CBSE
