= Ramjas School, Pusa Road =

Coordinates: 28.6440°N 77.1924°E

- Ramjas School, Pusa Road, NEW DELHI - 110005; Delhi, India

Information
- Funding type: Private Unaided
- Motto: Shraddha Gyan Karm
- Established: 1971
- Local authority: Director of Education Zone 28
- School code: 85028
- Chairperson: Shubhra Gupta
- Principal: Surbhi Dua
- Affiliation: Central Board of Secondary Education

Ramjas School is a senior secondary four-section school in New Delhi, India, affiliated with the CBSE. It was founded by businessman Ram Kunwar Gupta in 1971. The school is funded and run by the Ramjas Foundation.

The Principal of Ramjas School Pusa Road is Mrs. Surabhi Dua. The Chairperson of the school is Mahendra Kumar Chawla and The Manager of this school is Atam Prakash Aggarwal, who is brother of former Congress M.P Jai Prakash Aggarwal . Previously Shubhra Gupta was Chairperson of the school.

The school is a co-educational and is recognised by the Directorate of Education, Delhi. Ramjas is a four-section school from classes VI to XII. The school has about 1,000 students and 46 teachers. The school offers a wide range of courses at the +2 level in all the three streams, namely Science, Commerce and Humanities.

Classes are primarily taught in English. Other languages used are Hindi, Sanskrit and Spanish.

== Admission ==
Admissions in the school start from 6th Standard. On nearly 120 seats, students from Ramjas Primary Schools are given preference. These primary schools are:

1. Ramjas Nursery Primary School, Darya Ganj
2. Ramjas Primary School, P. K. Road
3. Ramjas Nursery Primary School, Ballimaran
4. Babu Ram Happy School, Kucha Pati Ram

Some seats are reserved for Economically Weaker Sections and Disabled and Handicapped Categories. These admissions are done through the Directorate of Education in Delhi. Every year the portal is opened for registration.

Admission criteria are overseen by the Directorate of Education.

== Activities ==
School activities include music, dance, arts, table tennis, volleyball, basketball, and computers.

The school has consistently hiked fees without approval and has resisted attempts by Education Department to regulate its fees The school hiked its fee by 8.72% in the year 2023 . It further hiked fees by 6.17% in 2024 despite an order of Directorate of Education not to hike it. The school is a member of Action Committee of Unaided Recognised Private Schools, an association of private schools which campaigns against regulations on private schools.

== See also ==
- Ramjas School, R. K. Puram
