= Sanskriti School =

Coordinates: 28.5884°N 77.1766°E

Location
- Dr. S. Radhakrishnan Marg; Chanakyapuri, New Delhi; 110021; India

Information
- Type: Private, co-educational, day school
- Motto: Knowledge is Liberation (Vidyaya cha vimuchyate)
- Established: 12 August 1998; 28 years ago
- Founder: Civil Services Society
- Principal: Richa Sharma Agnihotri (since 2017)
- Enrollment: Approximately 2,859
- Campus size: 7.78 acres
- Affiliation: CBSE
- Website: www.sanskritischool.edu.in

Sanskriti School is a private, co-educational day school located on Dr. S. Radhakrishnan Marg in the diplomatic enclave of Chanakyapuri, New Delhi, India. Affiliated with the Central Board of Secondary Education (CBSE), the school offers classes from nursery through Class XII. It was established in 1998 by the Civil Services Society, a registered body formed in 1995 by spouses of senior officers of the Government of India, with the stated objective of providing education to children of All India Services and Allied Services officers and defence personnel on transfer to Delhi. The school operates as a non-profit institution, with the spouse of the serving Cabinet Secretary of India as chairperson of its managing committee.

The school has been the subject of sustained legal proceedings. In 2015, the Delhi High Court quashed its 60 percent admission quota reserved for children of Group A central government officers, holding that a school built with public funds on state land could not restrict access to a narrow segment of civil servants. The Supreme Court of India stayed that order in January 2016, and the matter remains pending.

== History ==
=== Formation of the Civil Services Society ===
On 7 February 1995, the spouses of the then Cabinet Secretary, the Secretary of the Ministry of External Affairs, the Secretary of the Ministry of Commerce, and ten other senior officers of the Indian Administrative Service, Indian Revenue Service, Indian Police Service, and Indian Railway Technical Service registered a society named the Civil Services Society. The principal object of the society, as recorded in its registration documents and cited by the Delhi High Court, was to establish schools in or outside Delhi open to children of officers of the All India and Central Services, with a provision that surplus seats could be offered to children of officers of public sector undertakings and non-government employees.

=== Land allotment and public funding ===
On 21 June 1995, a meeting of senior Union government officials, including the Cabinet Secretary, the Foreign Secretary, the Defence Secretary, and the Secretary of the Department of Urban Development, authorised the allotment of 7.78 acres of land in Chanakyapuri to the Civil Services Society at a token premium of one rupee with an annual ground rent of one rupee. A decision was also taken at that meeting that various central government ministries, including the Ministry of Defence, the Ministry of Railways, and the Department of Personnel and Training (DoPT), would provide funds for construction of the school building, purchase of furniture, and other infrastructure, with a total commitment of approximately 19 crore rupees, of which nearly 10 crore rupees was designated as a corpus fund.

As disclosed by the central government during court proceedings, government agencies and ministries provided 15.945 crore rupees to the society for establishing the school, in addition to the corpus fund. A separate accounting by parents in a 2020 representation to the school's principal, based on the school's own financial records, placed cumulative grants and donations from central and state government ministries, departments, and public sector undertakings at 25.71 crore rupees as of 31 March 2011.

=== Establishment and early years ===
The foundation stone was laid on 30 May 1996 by Hemi Surendra Singh, then chairperson of the Civil Services Society and spouse of the serving Cabinet Secretary, Surendra Singh. Surendra Singh served as Cabinet Secretary from August 1994 to July 1996. The school commenced operations on 12 August 1998.

Gowri Ishwaran, a postgraduate in English literature who had previously taught at St. Michael's School in Patna, Springdales School in Delhi, and Delhi Public School, joined as the founding principal in 1999. Ishwaran was awarded the Padma Shri in 2004 for her contributions to education.

=== Succession of principals ===
Ishwaran was principal until 2008 and subsequently became the chief executive officer of The Global Education and Leadership Foundation (tGELF). She was succeeded by Abha Sehgal, from the 2008-09 academic session until April 2017. Richa Sharma Agnihotri has been the principal since 2017.

== Admissions and seat allocation ==
The school allocates its seats across four categories: 60 percent for children of Group A officers of the central government who enter service through the Civil Services Examination, 10 percent for the general public, 5 percent for children of school staff, and 25 percent for children from the Economically Weaker Section (EWS) category. The government quota covers officers of the Indian Administrative Service (IAS), Indian Police Service (IPS), Indian Foreign Service (IFS), Indian Revenue Service (IRS), and Indian Engineering Services (IES), among other Group A civil services.

Following the Supreme Court's stay order of January 2016, the school's admission guidelines for the 2024-25 academic year specified four sub-categories within the 60 percent government quota: All India Service officers on central deputation, Indian Foreign Service officers posted in Delhi, other eligible Central Service Officers (Group A) on transfer under the Central Staffing Scheme, and officers from the defence and other services on transfer.

The school began admitting students from economically weaker backgrounds in 2004, in line with its land allotment conditions that required 25 percent of intake capacity to be reserved for the EWS category. In 2012, a parent challenged the school's denial of EWS admissions to his two children despite the school having taken eight fresh admissions in Classes IV and VI that year with no EWS students admitted, which the Delhi High Court took up as a potential violation of its earlier directions and the Directorate of Education guidelines.

In 2022, the Delhi High Court ruled that officers of the Delhi Judicial Service could not be included in the "eligible Central Service Officers (Group A)" category for purposes of the school's reservation scheme, as the Delhi Judicial Service was not recruited through the Union Public Service Commission (UPSC).

== Legal proceedings ==
=== Delhi High Court PIL (2006-2015) ===
In 2006, the Delhi High Court initiated suo motu proceedings concerning the school's receipt of public funding and subsidised government land, which subsequently became a public interest litigation (PIL) under case number W.P.(C) 8973/2006. In 2014, the then Lieutenant Governor of Delhi Najeeb Jung filed a response defending the quota, stating that the reservation was structured to cater to the specific needs of children of serving employees whose jobs were transferable.

On 6 November 2015, after nine years of proceedings, a division bench of Justice Pradeep Nandrajog and Justice Mukta Gupta delivered its judgment. The court quashed the 60 percent reservation for children of Group A officers, holding that the school, having been funded entirely by public funds and established on state land allotted at a nominal sum, "would partake the character of the State." The bench held that the quota violated the principles of equal protection under Article 14 and equality of education under Article 21A of the Constitution. The court observed that the 60 percent quota created a "limited notion of diversity" and merely separated one category of civil servants' children from other similarly situated students.

The bench also rejected the justification offered by the Union of India and the IAS Association that the school was needed because existing Kendriya Vidyalayas in Delhi lacked sufficient seats for wards of Group A officers, remarking that another Kendriya Vidyalaya could have been established on the land that was allotted at no cost to the Civil Services Society. The court directed the Union government to consider whether the school could be made part of the existing Kendriya Vidyalaya Sangathan.

=== Supreme Court stay (2016) ===
In December 2015, both the Union of India and Sanskriti School filed special leave petitions (SLP(C) 35077/2015) before the Supreme Court of India challenging the High Court judgment.

On 21 January 2016, a Supreme Court bench headed by Justice Anil R. Dave stayed the Delhi High Court order, allowing the school to continue admissions under the existing quota system pending final adjudication. The bench directed that the 60 percent quota would cover children of central government employees of civil, defence, and allied services with transferable jobs and that no preferential treatment would be accorded to any particular category within that quota. Attorney General Mukul Rohatgi informed the court that the government had undertaken in an affidavit to extend the quota to wards of Group A, B, and C central government employees with transferable jobs.

As of October 2019, the case remained pending before the Supreme Court. The DoPT had directed central government ministries to furnish data on the number of officers transferred to New Delhi over the preceding five years in order to strengthen the government's defence of the quota, but most ministries had not complied. The school's admission guidelines for the 2024-25 academic year continued to cite the Supreme Court's January 2016 stay order as the governing authority for its seat allocation.

=== EWS admission fraud case (2023) ===
In December 2023, the Delhi High Court addressed a case in which a parent had secured his son's admission to Sanskriti School under the EWS category by submitting falsified birth and income certificates. Justice Purushaindra Kumar Kaurav dismissed the petition challenging cancellation of the admission but allowed the child to continue as a general category student, holding that the child should not be penalised for his father's actions. The court imposed a cost of 10 lakh rupees on the father. The case prompted the court to raise the income threshold for EWS admissions in Delhi schools from 1 lakh to 5 lakh rupees annually, pending government action to amend the relevant policy, though a division bench later modified this interim threshold to 2.5 lakh rupees.

== Fee controversies ==
=== Anil Dev Singh Committee findings ===
In 2016, a committee headed by Justice Anil Dev Singh, established by the Delhi High Court to review school fees, identified Sanskriti School among 449 private schools in Delhi that had overcharged parents on the pretext of implementing recommendations of the Sixth Central Pay Commission. The committee directed these schools to refund the excess fees collected. In 2017, the Delhi government issued show-cause notices to these schools and threatened to take them over if they did not comply with the refund order.

=== 2019 teacher salary dispute ===
In 2019, teachers of Sanskriti School approached the Delhi High Court alleging that the school was not paying them in accordance with the 7th Central Pay Commission. The court directed the Delhi government to decide on the school's application for permission to increase fees and appointed a chartered accountant to audit the school's accounts.

=== 2020 fee hike during COVID-19 ===
In March 2020, during the COVID-19 pandemic in India, the school announced a fee increase of 20 percent for the 2019-20 session (payable from April 2020) and a further 35 percent for 2020-21, citing financial difficulties arising from the obligation to pay staff salaries in accordance with the 7th Pay Commission.

Approximately 50 parents, including several senior civil servants, submitted a representation to the principal characterising the hike as "prohibitively exorbitant for everyone and particularly so for honest civil servants." The representation demanded an immediate rollback and a CAG audit of the school's and the Civil Services Society's accounts. The parents noted that the school had declared to the court that it had received no government grants in the preceding five years except for a sum of 18.14 lakh rupees from ONGC, but that a review of the Ministry of Personnel's own annual report for 2015-16 showed that the ministry's budget included expenditure on grants-in-aid to Sanskriti School. They also cited the Anil Dev Singh Committee's finding that the school had diverted funds to its parent society.

The Delhi government subsequently revoked the fee hike permission. Deputy Chief Minister Manish Sisodia stated that the school had not followed Generally Accepted Accounting Principles (GAAP), that it had a surplus from 2017-18, and that the school had attempted to recover fees previously ordered refunded under the Anil Dev Singh Committee's recommendations by showing them under other heads of school expenses.

== Umang programme ==
The school operates a parallel educational programme called Umang, which provides free education to children from economically disadvantaged backgrounds. The programme primarily serves children residing in Sanjay Basti, a settlement adjacent to the school campus.

== Rankings ==
In the Hindustan Times school survey, Sanskriti School was ranked the top school in Central Delhi in 2009 and second in Central Delhi in 2010. In 2015, it was ranked sixth among schools in Delhi and second in Central Delhi.

In a Times of India survey published in September 2011, Sanskriti School was listed among the top ten schools in Delhi.

In the EducationWorld-C fore India School Rankings 2012, the school was placed tenth in the co-educational day school category nationally. According to EducationWorld, the school was ranked among the top ten co-educational day schools in India in the 2020-21 edition of the survey.

== Faculty and alumni ==
=== Faculty ===
- Gowri Ishwaran (founding principal, 1999 to 2008): A postgraduate in English literature, Ishwaran was awarded the Padma Shri in 2004 for her contributions to the Indian education sector. After departing Sanskriti, she was chief executive officer of The Global Education and Leadership Foundation (tGELF) and became its vice-chairperson. She also was an adviser to the Shiv Nadar Foundation and sits on the Advisory Board of the Shiv Nadar School.
- Abha Sehgal (principal, 2008 to 2017): Sehgal began her teaching career at Delhi Public School, R.K. Puram in 1980, where she taught for two decades. In 2000, she moved to the United Arab Emirates as founding principal of DPS Sharjah, growing the school from an initial intake of around 100 students to 4,500 over eight years. She joined Sanskriti School as principal from 2008 to April 2017. Sehgal died in New Delhi in October 2020.

=== Alumni ===
- Tauseef Ali Farooqui: A former student, Farooqui went on to study biotechnology at IIT Guwahati. In March 2024, as a fourth-year student, he was detained by the Assam Police Special Task Force after posting an open letter on LinkedIn declaring his allegiance to the Islamic State and stating his intention to travel to ISIS-Khorasan Province. He was arrested under the Unlawful Activities (Prevention) Act.

== See also ==
- All India Services
- Education in Delhi
- Kendriya Vidyalaya
- Right of Children to Free and Compulsory Education Act, 2009
