= Defence Colony =

- Neighborhood of Delhi
- Defence Colony
- Nickname: Def Col
- Location in Delhi, India
- Coordinates: 28°34′23.589″N 77°13′58.882″E
- Country: India
- State: Delhi
- District: South East Delhi
- Established: 1960

Population
  - Total: 8,000−10,000
- Time zone: UTC+5:30 (IST)
- PIN: 110024
- Urban Local Body: MCD

Defence Colony is a neighbourhood in the South East Delhi district of Delhi, India. It was built in the 1960s for veterans of the Indian Armed Forces. It serves as the administrative headquarters of the South East Delhi district of Delhi.

It is popular for being centrally located to all major parts of the city, its well-maintained parks, broad streets, active community clubs, and notable residents from entertainment and politics. Defence Colony is home to many restaurants, coffee shops, art galleries and, shops.

== Overview ==
Defence Colony was created in the aftermath of the partition in 1947 and was built on the vast lands of the Kotla Mubarakpur village. Newly independent India allotted land to resettle serving Indian military officers whose homes lay across the new border in Muslim-majority Pakistan. Besides its central location within Delhi, the locality is also known for the wide variety of cuisines offered by its many restaurants.

Defence Colony Welfare Association Club, commonly referred to as Defence Colony Club was established in 1976 as Defence Colony Ex. Services Institute, however, was renamed in 1980 and functions under the Defence Colony Welfare Association.

== Historic monuments ==
Close to the main Defence Colony market inside a roundabout stands the octagonal tomb of Shaikh Ali, known as "Gumti of Shaikh Ali". Built-in the 15th-century Lodhi dynasty-era, near the historic area of Kotla Mubarakpur, it housed two graves inside the tomb until the early 20th-century, which are now long gone. The tomb has housed the Defence Colony Welfare Association (DCWA) office since 1960.

== Transportation ==
Defence Colony is accessible by many means of public transport including auto rickshaw, taxi, Delhi Transport Corporation buses as well as the Delhi Metro. The closest metro station to most of Defence Colony is Lajpat Nagar, which is an interchange station between the Violet Line and Pink Line. For some parts of the Defence Colony, it is closer to walk to the South Extension metro station, which is on the Pink Line. To the Northeast of Defence Colony is the Sewa Nagar railway station of the Delhi Ring Railway.

To the South, Defence Colony is bounded by the Ring Road. To its east and west are Lala Lajpat Rai Marg and Bhishma Pitamah Marg respectively. The North of Defence Colony is bounded by the tracks of the Delhi Ring Railway.

== Education ==
- South Delhi Public School
- Dr Radhakrishnan International School

== Places of worship ==
- Gurudwara Shri Guru Singh Sabha
- Shri Radha Krishna Mandir
- Arya Samaj
- Shiv Mandir
- Defence Colony Jama Masjid
- St. Luke's Church

== Healthcare ==
- Nehru Homeopathic Medical College and Hospital

== Notable people ==
=== Live/lived in Defence Colony ===
- Vishal Uppal, Indian national tennis player
- Rohit Bal, Indian fashion designer
- Nafisa Ali, former Miss India
- Sidharth Malhotra, actor
- Rabinder Singh, intelligence officer
- Sonal Mansingh, classical dancer
