= The Modern School ECNCR =

- Rajiv Gandhi Education City, Phase II

Information
- Established: 1920
- Founder: Lala Raghubir Singh
- Principal: Rajiv K Shrivastava
- Website: modernschoolec.com

The Modern School ECNCR is a co-educational independent day and boarding school on Barakhamba Road in New Delhi, India. It was founded in 1920 by Lala Raghubir Singh, a Delhi-based philanthropist.

The School has two campuses, holding a variety of educational institutions and academic opportunities. It has several sister schools, including Modern School New Delhi, and most recently, Modern School, Kundli.

== Origin ==
Lala Raghubir Singh founded The Modern School in 1920 in a Haveli located in Daryaganj, Delhi belonging to his father, Sultan Singh. Lalaji's vision was to establish a school that would combine the traditions of Indian education with modern educational techniques and foster all-around growth for children who attended.

It was the first co-educational school in the city with as many women teachers as men. The first principal was a Bengali Christian, Kamla Bose. The school started off with about 30 students, three of whom were girls. Besides the normal curricula, the Modern School also introduced painting (with the Bengali artist Sarda Ukil), music, carpentry, scouting, and military drill under an English sergeant.

== History ==
The Modern School came into existence on October 20th, 1920, with six children on the rolls (the numbers swelled up to twelve by the end of the year). On January 4, 1933, at the time a day boarding school with 125 scholars enrolled, it moved to its present location on Barakhamba Road.

Growing in popularity year after year, the need for expansion arose, causing the junior wing to be moved to Humayun Road and formally inaugurated by Pt. Jawaharlal Nehru in October 1961. The school at the new location came to be known as Raghubir Singh Junior Modern School and gained autonomy in its functioning as a primary school. As the number of enrolled students further grew, Savitri Pratap Singh Block was added to the existing building in 1993.

Every year, the School hosts two annual days for students and teachers to show the local community their achievements and showcase their talents.

== Kundli Campus ==
Kundli Campus is one of the two campuses that are part of the Modern School infrastructure. It is currently still in development but already contains the main school buildings.

The campus also contains many other institutions, including Ashoka University, the Asian Education Society, and the Birla Institute of Management Technology, among others.

== Deepali Campus ==
The Deepali Campus hosts Early Childhood Education for the Modern School. Based on the principle of "learning by doing," the program promotes student participation and creativity through various activities.
