= Kendriya Vidyalaya Janakpuri =

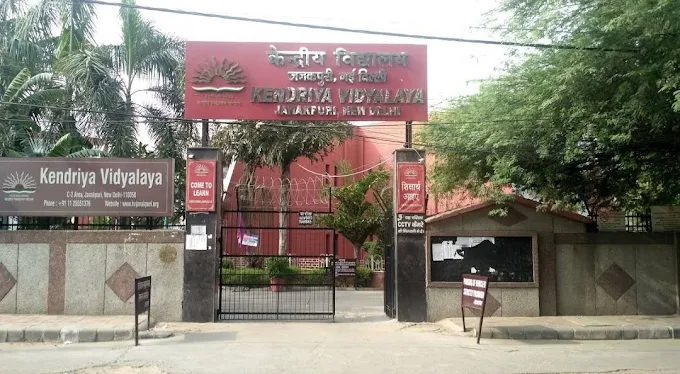

Location
- C-2 Block, Janakpuri, New Delhi – 110058

Information
- Type: Co-educational senior secondary school
- Established: 1973
- School board: Central Board of Secondary Education (CBSE)
- School code: 1424
- Principal: Satish Kumar Sharma
- Grades: I–XII
- Enrollment: Approx. 2,600 (Shift I); 1,300 (Shift II)
- Campus type: Urban
- Affiliation: CBSE Affiliation No. 2700007
- Website: https://janakpuri.kvs.ac.in

Kendriya Vidyalaya Janakpuri (officially PM Shri Kendriya Vidyalaya Janakpuri) is a co-educational senior secondary school located in Janakpuri, West Delhi, India. Established in 1973, the school is operated by the Kendriya Vidyalaya Sangathan (KVS), an autonomous body under the Ministry of Education, Government of India. The institution operates in two shifts, with the second shift commencing in September 2004.

The school holds the unique distinction of having housed the KVS Delhi Regional Office from October 1984 to November 1992. It has been designated as a PM SHRI School under the Government of India's flagship educational initiative aimed at developing model schools across the country.

== History ==
=== Establishment and early years ===
Kendriya Vidyalaya Janakpuri was established in 1973 as part of the Kendriya Vidyalaya Sangathan (KVS) network, which operates under the Ministry of Education, Government of India. The institution was founded to provide quality education to the children of transferable central government employees, including those in the Defence and Para-Military sectors, ensuring educational continuity despite frequent relocations.

=== Regional office headquarters (1984–1992) ===
From October 1984 to November 1992, the school campus served as the headquarters for the KVS Delhi Regional Office, which was relocated from Kendriya Vidyalaya Sector 2, R.K. Puram. During this period, the Delhi Region comprised 33 schools, which has since expanded to 69 Kendriya Vidyalayas, including second shifts.

=== Expansion and modern development ===
In September 2004, Kendriya Vidyalaya Janakpuri expanded to accommodate growing educational demands by launching its second shift. As of the latest available data, approximately 2,600 students study in the first shift, and 1,300 in the second shift, with a combined teaching staff of over 128 educators and administrative personnel.

== Campus and infrastructure ==
=== Location and general facilities ===
Kendriya Vidyalaya Janakpuri is situated at C-2 Block, Janakpuri, New Delhi – 110058.

=== Campus area ===
The school occupies a total area of 7.37 acres, providing space for academic, recreational, and administrative purposes.

=== Academic infrastructure ===
The school is equipped with academic facilities, including:

- Classrooms with smart board technology
- Well-stocked libraries for both shifts
- Science laboratories for Physics, Chemistry, and Biology
- Computer laboratories and ICT-enabled e-classrooms
- Digital Language Laboratory
- Atal Tinkering Lab (established in 2020) for innovation and technology education

=== Sports and recreation ===
The campus provides extensive sports facilities, including:

- Playgrounds for volleyball, basketball, athletics, and traditional Indian games
- Indoor court for badminton and table tennis
- Cricket and football ground

=== Additional facilities ===
Other campus amenities include:

- Medical facilities and wellness programs
- CCTV surveillance for security
- Water purification systems
- Modernized pathways and landscaped park areas

== Academics ==
=== Curriculum ===
Kendriya Vidyalaya Janakpuri is affiliated with the Central Board of Secondary Education (CBSE) under affiliation number 2700007. The school follows the CBSE curriculum from Class I to Class XII, providing a standardized and nationally recognized education.

=== Senior secondary streams ===
At the +2 level (Class XI–XII), Kendriya Vidyalaya Janakpuri offers three academic streams across both shifts:

- Science (with Biology and Informatics Practices options)
- Commerce
- Humanities / Arts

These streams are designed to cater to diverse student interests and career aspirations.

=== Language of instruction ===
The school operates as a bilingual institution, offering instruction in both Hindi and English, which helps students achieve proficiency in both languages.

=== Academic performance ===
Kendriya Vidyalaya Janakpuri has consistently achieved strong academic results in CBSE Board Examinations, maintaining a high pass percentage in both Class X and Class XII. Kendriya Vidyalayas in the Delhi region have historically achieved pass rates exceeding 99%.

== Co-curricular activities ==
=== Scouts and guides ===
Kendriya Vidyalaya Janakpuri has an active Scouts and Guides program. Students participate in various scouting activities, including rallies, camps, and community service projects. The school organizes Rajya Puraskar and Rashtrapati Puraskar camps, and students from classes III to V engage in Cubs and Bulbul activities. These programs aim to develop leadership, discipline, and social responsibility among students.

=== Atal Tinkering Lab ===
Established in early 2020, the Atal Tinkering Lab promotes innovation, scientific temperament, and hands-on learning in emerging technologies including robotics, 3D printing, electronics, and artificial intelligence. Students participate in national innovation challenges and competitions organized by the Atal Innovation Mission under NITI Aayog.

=== Youth parliament ===
The school actively participates in the National Youth Parliament Competition, providing students with platforms to engage in parliamentary-style debates, develop leadership skills, and understand democratic processes. The competition fosters civic awareness and public speaking abilities.

=== Ek Bharat Shreshtha Bharat ===
As part of the national integration initiative, the school conducts activities showcasing cultural diversity including folk dances, traditional music, art exhibitions, language learning, and cultural exchanges with paired states. This program highlights unity in diversity and is held annually in Kendriya Vidyalayas.

=== Sports achievements ===
Students from KV Janakpuri have achieved success in regional and national level sports competitions. In the 2022 Delhi Cup organized by KVS Delhi Region, students excelled in volleyball, athletics, and team games. Eight students participated in open national level sports competitions and secured first positions.

=== Cultural activities ===
The school organizes regular cultural programs including:

- Annual Day celebrations
- Independence Day and Republic Day observances
- Science exhibitions
- Art and craft competitions
- Music and dance performances

== Awards and recognition ==
=== Institutional awards ===
Kendriya Vidyalaya Janakpuri has received several institutional honors for its academic standards and contribution to holistic education:

- Selected as a PM SHRI School under the Government of India’s national initiative to develop model schools.
- Received the Eco-Friendly School Award (2013) for sustainable campus practices.
- Honoured with the Girl-Centric Education and Training Award (2018) for promoting inclusive education and empowerment of female students.

=== Teacher achievements ===
Faculty members of the school have been recognized at regional and national levels for their excellence in teaching and innovation:

- Sh. Sushil Upadhyay – Hindi Language Award (2024) for excellence in Hindi education.
- Mrs. Punita – Laxmi Mazumdar Award for exceptional contribution to the Bharat Scouts and Guides movement.
- Mrs. Monika Batra – Regional Award for creative teaching material (Technofun Book).
- Ms. Manpreet Kaur – Regional Award for creative educational innovation (Technofun Book).
- Mr. Vinay Kumar – Innovative Teacher Award for integrating technology with classroom pedagogy.

=== Student achievements ===
Students of Kendriya Vidyalaya Janakpuri have earned recognition in academics, co-curricular activities, and sports at state, regional, and national levels:

- Consistent participation and success in National and International Olympiads (Mathematics, Science, Cyber, and Green Olympiads).
- Representation in National Science and Social Science Exhibitions organized by Kendriya Vidyalaya Sangathan and NCERT.
- Notable performances in Kala Utsav, with students representing the Delhi Region at the national level.
- Multiple medal winners in KVS Regional and National Sports Meets, particularly in volleyball, athletics, and team events.
- Active participation and innovation in Atal Tinkering Lab Competitions, including national-level challenges organized by the Atal Innovation Mission, NITI Aayog.

== Student Council and leadership ==
Kendriya Vidyalaya Janakpuri has an active Student Council elected annually to encourage student participation in school governance, discipline, and co-curricular activities. The council includes positions such as School Captain (Boys and Girls), Vice-Captains, House Captains, Sports Captains, Co-Curricular Activity (CCA) Captains, Discipline Captains, and Publication Captains.

== School motto and philosophy ==
The motto of Kendriya Vidyalaya Janakpuri is "Tat Tvam Pooshan Apavrinu" (तत् त्वं पूषण अपावृणु), a verse derived from the Isha Upanishad. It translates to:

“O Lord, the face of Truth is covered with a golden disc. Please remove that covering and reveal the Truth to the seeker of righteousness.”

This guiding principle reflects the school’s educational philosophy, which emphasizes:

- The pursuit of truth and knowledge through disciplined learning.
- The removal of ignorance and self-awareness as a path to enlightenment.
- Education as a means of righteousness (dharma) and holistic human development.

The motto aligns with the broader vision of Kendriya Vidyalaya Sangathan, which seeks to nurture intellectual, moral, and spiritual growth in students while fostering national integration and global awareness.

== See also ==
- List of Kendriya Vidyalayas
- Kendriya Vidyalaya Sangathan
- Central Board of Secondary Education
- National Council of Educational Research and Training
