= The Global Education & Leadership Foundation =

- Abbreviation: tGELF
- Formation: 2008; 18 years ago
- Type: Foundation
- Purpose: Ethical leadership, Education, Skilling
- Headquarters: Gurgaon, Haryana, India
- Region served: Worldwide
- Method: Curriculum, Projects
- Owner: The Nand & Jeet Khemka Foundation
- Key people: Shiv V. Khemka (Executive Chairman), Gowri Ishwaran (Vice-Chair)
- Website: tGELF.org

The Global Education & Leadership Foundation (tGELF) is an organization that focuses on cultivating ethical, altruistic leadership aimed at improving the overall standard of the world.

The foundation currently connects with 1,000,000 students through 7000 master trainers across 1000 schools & NGOs in 12 countries.

It was founded in 2008 by The Nand andJeet Khemka foundation.Its headquarters is based in Gurgaon, Haryana, India.

== History ==
tGELF was officially launched in 2008 by the then Prime Minister of India Dr. Manmohan Singh.

== Programs ==
=== SKILLD ===
Skilling & Knowhow Initiative for Lifelong Leadership Development (SKILLD) is a unique value-based curriculum developed with Teachers College, Columbia University.

=== Education Prize ===
The Education Prize is an annual competition organized by tGELF for school teachers in India and abroad. The winners are given a letter of recommendation and a cash prize of Rs 1 lakh (USD 1500 approx.) each.

== Initiatives ==
=== Global Citizen India ===
In 2016, tGELF partnered Global Citizen to host first edition of the Global Citizen India Festival.

The festival was hosted on 19 November in Mumbai, India, where it was headlined by Coldplay and Jay Z. Prime Minister of India Narendra Modi made a short address to the crowd via video conference.

The promotional campaign mobilized over 500,000 youths who took more than 2 million "actions" through digital platforms calling on government, faith leaders, business icons and celebrities to be more accountable on education, gender equality, water and sanitation. The star-studded event headlined by Coldplay drew 85,000 people and raised more than USD 5 BN while clocking a TV Viewership of 2 million people across India.

== Awards & Recognitions ==
tGELF was awarded the Outstanding Contribution to Education Award at the Wharton-QS Stars Awards 2014 by University of Pennsylvania. The award is also known as 'Oscars for Education'
