= St. Paul's School, Delhi =

St. Paul's School

Location
- C-3, Safdarjung Development Area; Delhi, 110016; India; 28.5488°N 77.1992°E

Information
- Type: Private
- Denomination: Delhi Orthodox Diocese
- Established: 1968; 58 years ago
- Principal: Ms. Susan Jacob
- Board: Central Board of Secondary Education
- Website: http://www.stpauls-delhi.com/

St. Paul's School, Delhi is an unaided, co-educational English-medium private school run by The Delhi Orthodox Syrian Church Society, located in Safdarjung Development Area, South Delhi.

== History ==
The school was established on 28 April 1968 under the Delhi Orthodox Church Trust Society. Currently the school has more than 2200 students and 120 faculty members. The school had a complete pass rate among all the students who gave the Grade 12 board exams.

== See also ==
- Education in India
- Education in Delhi
- List of schools in Delhi
- CBSE
