= Satbari =

Village in Delhi, India

Satbari Satbadi
- Village
- Interactive map of Satbari
- Location in New Delhi
- Coordinates: 28°28′27″N 77°11′34″E
- Country: India
- State: Delhi
- District: South Delhi

Government
  - Type: State government
  - Body: Delhi Legislative Assembly

Population (2011)
  - Total: 6,076
  - Estimate (2022): 9,166

Languages
  - Official: Hindi, English
- Time zone: UTC+05:30 (IST)
- PIN: 110074
- Civic body: Municipal Corporation of Delhi

Satbari (also spelled as Satbadi) is a village and census town located in the Chhatarpur area of South Delhi district in Delhi, India. Its postal code is 110074. It is situated near the southern ridge of the Aravallis, and is known for its greenery and farmhouses.

Satbari is one of the twelve villages of the Chhatarpur area in south Delhi. The majority of its residents follow the Islamic religion.

== Demographics ==
According to the reports of the 2011 census of India, Satbari had a population of 6,076 of which 3,438 (57%) were males while 2,628 (43%) were females.

In 2011, the literacy rate of Satbari was 81.60%, compared to 86.21% in Delhi. In the village, the male literacy rate was 88.56%, and the female literacy rate was 72.14%.

== Notable people ==
- Huma Qureshi, actress.

== Schools nearby ==
- Col. Satsangi's Kiran Memorial Public School
- Made Easy School

== See also ==
- Chandan Hola
- Rajpur Khurd
