= Naresh Mohan =

President and Group CEO Of Trinidad Group

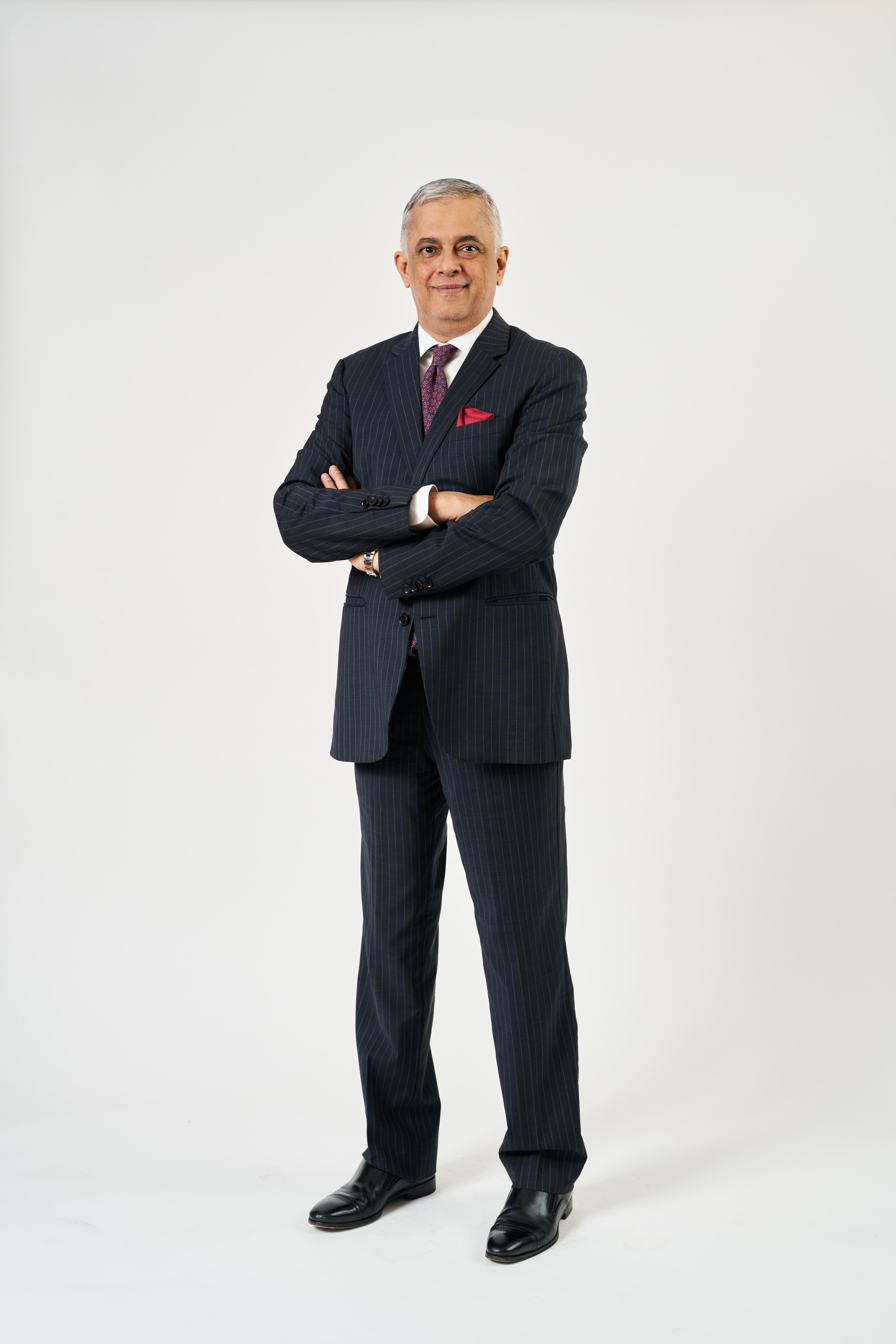
- Born: 9 July 1965 (age 61)
- Citizenship: Singapore
- Occupation: Businessman - Investor - Hotelier - Philanthropist
- Years active: 1986 - present
- Title: President and Group CEO Of Trinidad Hospitality
- Spouse(s): YAM Tengku Puteri Seri Bongsu Tengku Dato’ Sri Hajah Shahariah binti Al-Marhum Sultan Haji Ahmad Shah Al-Musta’IN Billah DK., SIMP
- Children: 4, including YM Puteri Amida Afsha Afzan and YM Puteri Ameera Azwa Asyarah
- Parent: K. Mohan (Father) Lajwanti Mohan (Mother)
- Website: trinidadhospitality.com

Y.H. Dato' Sri Omar Naresh Mohan (born 9 July 1965), known simply as Naresh Mohan, is a Singaporean businessman, brother-in-law to the Sultan of Pahang and member of the Pahang Royal Family. He is the Founder, President and Group CEO of Trinidad Hospitality, operated by Trinidad Hospitality Sdn Bhd (formerly known as Hospitality 360 Sdn Bhd) and a shareholder of several other groups of companies.

In September 2023, he was appointed as the Honorary Consul of the Consulate of Monaco in Kuala Lumpur, Malaysia, by H.S.H. Prince Albert II of Monaco.

== Early life ==
Naresh Mohan was born in Singapore in 1965, the fourth child of K. Mohan and Lajwanti Mohan. His family traces its roots to the Sindh region of Pakistan.

== Career ==
Naresh began his professional career in the textile industry, managing family-run businesses in Europe. In the early 1990s, he relocated to Malaysia, where he entered various business ventures in hospitality, lifestyle, and retail sectors.

He is the founder of the Trinidad Hospitality, which was initially established as a cigar distribution company and later expanded into hospitality, hotel management, property services, and digital travel platforms. Notable subsidiaries and projects under Trinidad Hospitality include:

- Trinidad Hospitality Sdn Bhd (formerly known as Hospitality 360 Sdn Bhd) – A hospitality management company that oversees a portfolio of hotels, including properties under the Wyndham brand.
- Trinidad Cigar Company – A retailer and distributor of premium cigars in Malaysia.
- Go Tifi (Travel Club 360 Sdn Bhd) – A travel platform integrating artificial intelligence for itinerary planning
- Kuantan 188 (Infiniti Indah Sdn Bhd) – A 104-metre observation tower in Kuantan, Pahang, Malaysia.
- Trisend Logistic Technologies Sdn Bhd – A logistics company operating in Malaysia and the Philippines

In 2019, MAA Group Berhad acquired a 51% stake in Trinidad Hospitality Sdn Bhd to support its expansion in the hospitality sector.

== Other roles ==
Naresh has held advisory and board positions in tourism and non-profit organizations, including:

- Member, Malaysian Association of Hotels (MAH)
- EXCO Member, Kuala Lumpur Tourism Association (KLTA)
- Board Member, Yayasan Tunku Naquiyuddin
- Board of Governors, Budimas Charitable Foundation
- Board of Governors, MAA-Medicare Charitable Foundation

== Personal life ==
In 2014, he married Tengku Puteri Seri Bongsu Tengku Dato’ Sri Hajah Shahariah, the youngest daughter of the late Sultan Ahmad Shah of Pahang. The ceremony was held at Istana Pahang in Kuala Lumpur. Through this marriage, he became affiliated with the Pahang Royal Family.

He has children from his current and previous marriage. Naresh is known to enjoy golf, sailing, reading, and spending time with his family.

== Honours ==
- Knight Companion of the Order of the Crown of Pahang (SIMP) – 2016
- Grand Knight of the Order of Sultan Ahmad Shah of Pahang (SSAP) – 2023, which carries the title “Dato’ Sri”

== Recognition ==
Naresh has been featured in several regional business publications and has been recognized for his contributions to hospitality and tourism. Selected recognitions include:

- Featured in Britishpedia: Successful People in Malaysia (2024 edition)
- MITA Tourism Hero Award (2023)
- HAPA Malaysia Series Entrepreneur Award (2023-2024)
