= Mount Carmel School =

Location
- Anand Niketan, Delhi; India; 28°34′34″N 77°09′54″E

Information
- Type: Private
- Established: 1972; 54 years ago
- School code: DL01848, DL01937
- Director: Dr. Michael Williams
- Principal: Dr. Rajiv Tyagi, John Rafi, Roma Das
- Campus: Urban
- Affiliation: CBSE
- Alumni: Old Mount Carmelites
- Website: www.mountcarmeldelhi.com

Mount Carmel School (New Delhi) is a co-educational private school for boarding and day students located in Anand Niketan, Delhi, India with branches at Dwarka and Gurugram. The school is affiliated to the Central Board of Secondary Education (CBSE) and run by a registered educational society called Mount Carmel School Society. It is a church-based society, registered under the Societies Registration Act, 1860, running unaided minority educational institutions in the national capital. Today the school has over 45,000 students with a staff of 180 at the 3 branches.

== History ==
The Mount Carmel School was founded by Late Flt. Lt. Dr. Vijay K. Williams and Late Dr. Neena M. Williams on 10 July 1972 with only 12 students in their home at E-47 Anand Niketan. Today, the Anand Niketan branch has nearly 2,500 students, a staff of 150 and two buildings: the Junior School, housing students from Nursery to Class III; and the Senior School for Classes IV to Class XII.

In 2012, the school celebrated 40th anniversary of its foundation in Talkatora Stadium where Air chief marshal Norman Anil Kumar Browne honoured the founding principals. The founder's day event was attended by the Indian Foreign Secretary of India Ranjan Mathai and the Financial Commissioner of Delhi.

A film 40 Glorious Years was released by Vineet Joshi, chairman of the CBSE and vice-chancellor of Allahabad Agricultural University.

=== Dwarka ===
The branch at Dwarka, Delhi began in 1997, on the occasion of the silver jubilee year of the parent school, with 165 students. Now the school has about 3,500 students with 300 staff members. The school offers Nursery to Class XII classes and is recognised by the Delhi government and is affiliated to the CBSE.

== Academics and sports ==
Mount Carmel School offers an international student exchange program with sister schools in Singapore, Wales, Hungary and Indonesia allowing students to experience the lifestyles and cultures from around the world.

The school recently won the gold medal in the 33rd Delhi State Taekwondo Championship. The school secured the second position in the All India Tennis Championship held in Karnal.

In terms of academic achievement, in 2019 a school student topped the prestigious Joint Entrance Examination by scoring 100 percentile. Out of a total 1,147,125 students who appeared for the JEE exam the school's performance had been outstanding overall.

== Right to Education ==
In August 2002 the Mount Carmel School took initiative on a 'Right to Education' programme and set up a Shiksha Kendra, an informal learning centre. Teachers of the school camped at the slum clusters located in West Delhi for more than two months and convinced hundreds of parents to send their children to school. Now Mount Carmel is providing education, nutrition and healthcare to all these children.

Mount Carmel Delhi encourages students to undertake the responsibility of educating the underprivileged children from class XI as one of its flagship programmes in community service.

== Cultural exchange ==
The school celebrates cultural events in other countries as well in participation with embassies of countries; students do research and gain knowledge on the culture, tradition, political parties, military and government.

== See also ==
- List of schools in Delhi
- Catholic school
- Catholic Church in India
