= Atal Innovation Mission =

Government Initiative for Business Incubation

- Official logo

Agency overview
- Formed: January 16, 2016; 10 years ago
- Jurisdiction: Government of India
- Headquarters: New Delhi, India
- Parent department: NITI Aayog
- Website: aim.gov.in

Atal Innovation Mission (AIM), is a Government of India initiative under NITI Aayog to promote innovation and entrepreneurship in India. It began in 2016. The initiative focuses on creating a problem-solving and innovative mindsets in students. It seeks to create an ecosystem of entrepreneurship in universities, research institutions, in both private and MSME sectors. AIM acts as an umbrella structure, providing platforms and collaboration opportunities for stakeholders in the entrepreneurial space.

== AIM programs ==
=== Tinkering Laboratories ===
Atal Tinkering Laboratories (ATLs), under AIM, function at school level. Their objective is to promote creativity, curiosity, and imagination. They focus on teaching skills such as design mindset, computational thinking, adaptive learning, and physical computing. The program targets students between 6th to 12th standards. It includes hands-on learning of modern tools and technologies such as Internet of things, 3D printing, rapid prototyping tools, robotics, miniaturized electronics, and do-it-yourself kits.

In 2025, AIM established 10,000 Labs in schools in 35 states and union territories. These span 722 districts and mentor more than 1.1 crore students.

Atal Tinkering Lab packages include:

- Electronics Development, Robotics, IoT and Sensors
- Rapid Prototyping Tools
- Mechanical, Electrical and Measurement Tools
- Power Supply, Accessoriesm and Safety Equipment

=== Incubation Centres ===
Atal Incubation Centres (AICs) act as business incubators and are established at universities, institutions and companies. They promote world-class innovation by supporting entrepreneurs in creating enterprises.

In 2025, 72 AICs operated across India. They provide services to startups including technical facilities, mentorship, resource-based support, funding support, co-working spaces, partnerships, and networking. More than 3500 startups have been incubated at AICs, which have created more than 32,000 jobs.

More than 1,000 startups incubated at these AICs have a women leader or founder. Startups incubated at AICs address diverse markets including healthtech, fintech, space and drone tech, educational tech, AR/VR, tourism, and food processing.

== See also ==
- Startup India
- Make in India
- Digital India
- Stand-Up India
