= Col. Satsangi's Kiran Memorial Public School =

School in New Delhi, India

Col Satsangi's Kiran Memorial Public School

Location
- Ansal Villas, Satbari; Chhattarpur, Delhi; India; 28°28′25″N 77°12′24″E

Information
- Other names: C.S.K.M, CSKM School, CSKM Public School
- Type: Private
- Motto: Busy Bee Pleasure
- Established: 1986
- Founder: Lt Col P S Satsangi (VSM)
- Principal: Dr. Shakuntla S Jaiman
- Faculty: 44
- Gender: Co-ed
- Age: 3 years to 16 years
- Classes offered: Nursery - XII
- Area: 15 acres
- Campus type: Urban
- Affiliations: Central Board of Secondary Education
- Website: cskm.com

Colonel Satsangi's Kiran Memorial Public School, (CSKM Public School) established in 1986 by Lt Col P S Satsangi (VSM), is a senior secondary school affiliated with the Central Board of Secondary Education. It offers various schooling programs, including residential, long hours day boarding, and month end/week end home boarding, blending aspects of the Public School System with the Indian Gurukul System.

== Location ==
The School is located in the Satbari area in Chattarpur, South Delhi, New Delhi, India.

== History ==
The School was established in 1986 by Lt Col P S Satsangi VSM, a renowned figure in school education. Col Satsangi was honored with the Vishisht Sewa Medal for his contributions to education.

== School flag ==
The school flag consists of three colors: steel grey, blood red, and navy blue. Steel grey represents determination and endurance, blood red signifies sacrifice in devotion to duty, while navy blue symbolizes the path of character and thought.

== Streams ==
The school offers three streams: Science, Commerce, and Humanities.

== Infrastructure ==
The school is equipped with various facilities, including activity rooms, an auditorium, AV room, banquet hall, library, Computer Science labs, counselling centre, dining hall, internet access, language labs, lecture theaters, open-air theaters, Psychology lab, reference library, science laboratory, self-learning centre, seminar halls, Smart classes, staff rooms, basketball courts, badminton courts, lawn tennis courts, cricket ground, football ground, and table tennis courts.

Additionally, the school provides boarding facilities for both boys and girls, with many teachers residing on campus to ensure the well-being and supervision of the students throughout the day.

== Sports ==
The school has sports facilities, including four basketball courts, three tennis courts, two volleyball courts, and two badminton courts. Additionally, students have access to cricket and football fields, an athletic track, and facilities for yoga, multi-gym workouts, table tennis, skating, and taekwondo. The school also features a swimming pool and a splash pool for aquatic activities. Students benefit from specialized coaching provided by the Peninsula Tennis Academy, further enhancing their skills and abilities in various sports disciplines.

== Alumni of CSKM Public School ==
- Shri Nitin Nabin - National President of Bhartiya Janta Party
- Saurabh Raj Jain - Actor
- Shri Kunal Ravi Singh - Hon'ble Justice of The Allahabad High Court
- Shri Satyavrat Verma - Hon'ble Justice of The Patna High Court
- Shri Sanjay Bhoi - Politician
- Mr Hafiz Khan - Actor
- Mr Sunil Mansingh - Journalist
- Shri Hitender Hari - Judge
- Ms Priya Shekhar - Judge
- Ms Khushboo Singh - Actor
- Shri Niraj Bahadur Shahi - Police officer
- Shri Naresh Mohan Jha - Government official
- Mr Ved Pal - Councillor (Aya Nagar, New Delhi)
- Shri Sanjay Kumar - District Magistrate
- Shri Amrit Abhijat - IAS officer
