= Zabaan School for Languages =

Language school in India

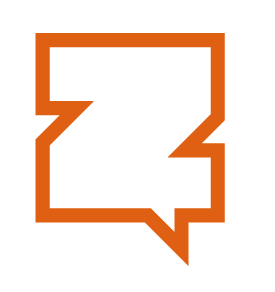

Location
- New Delhi, Mumbai; India
- Coordinates: 28.554420°N 77.240718°E

Information
- Opened: August 2009
- Website: zabaan.com

Zabaan School for Languages is a language school based in Delhi and Mumbai offering classes on Indo-Aryan languages. Classes offered include Hindi, Urdu, Sanskrit, and Pashto. Some coverage of Dari, Persian, Arabic, and Braj Bhasha is also available.

== History ==
Zabaan was established in August 2009 by Ali Taqi and his former student Christoph Dusenbery, both United States citizens, who had been teaching Hindi in Seattle. They saw a need for a quality language institute in New Delhi to cater to expatriates living there for work. The initial business goal was to provide only Hindi language instruction starting with 25 students. After some time the institute began offering classes in Urdu, Sanskrit, and Pashto. The school offers classes on reading and writing the Urdu alphabet. The interest in Urdu matches a rising demand to understand Urdu use in Bollywood and to appreciate Urdu poetry.

== Student body ==
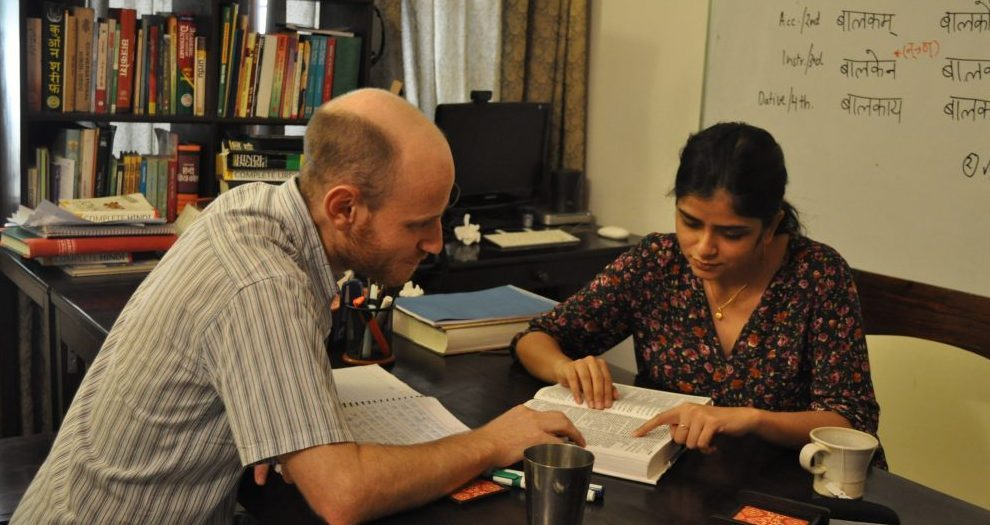
Neha Tiwari teaching David Advanced Hindi

Most students at the school are expatriates who wish to learn local languages of India. Taqi has said that student interest in Hindi has grown with international interest in India. Many of the students are learning Hindi for international business with India. Native professionals attend grammar classes of all sorts to prepare for the entrance exam for the Civil Services of India or to complement studies at the Indian Institutes of Technology. By 2013 the school had provided instruction for more than 850 students.
