= Bluebells School International =

International school in New Delhi, India

Coordinates: 28.559°N 77.238°E

Information
- Motto: One planet the Earth, One Family – Mankind
- Established: 1957; 69 years ago
- Founder: Mari Guha
- Teaching staff: 150
- Grades: Nursery - XII
- Enrollment: 1875 (2015)

Bluebells School International is an international school in Kailash Colony, New Delhi, India. As of 2015, the school has 1,875 students in levels Nursery through XII, with 150 teachers. It has Pre-Primary, Primary School, Middle School, and Secondary & Senior Secondary programmes. The current campus has 3 acres (1.2 ha) of land.

Its motto is 'One planet the Earth, One Family – Mankind'. It was first established in 1957. A Hungarian woman named Mari Guha established the school in Jorbagh and passed control to G. Soni after Guha left India. The current campus in Kailash opened in 1977 and the school's senior secondary school section was recognised in 1978.

The school's current principal's name is Sonal Rawat.
