= Janakpuri =

Suburb of South West Delhi, India

- Suburb
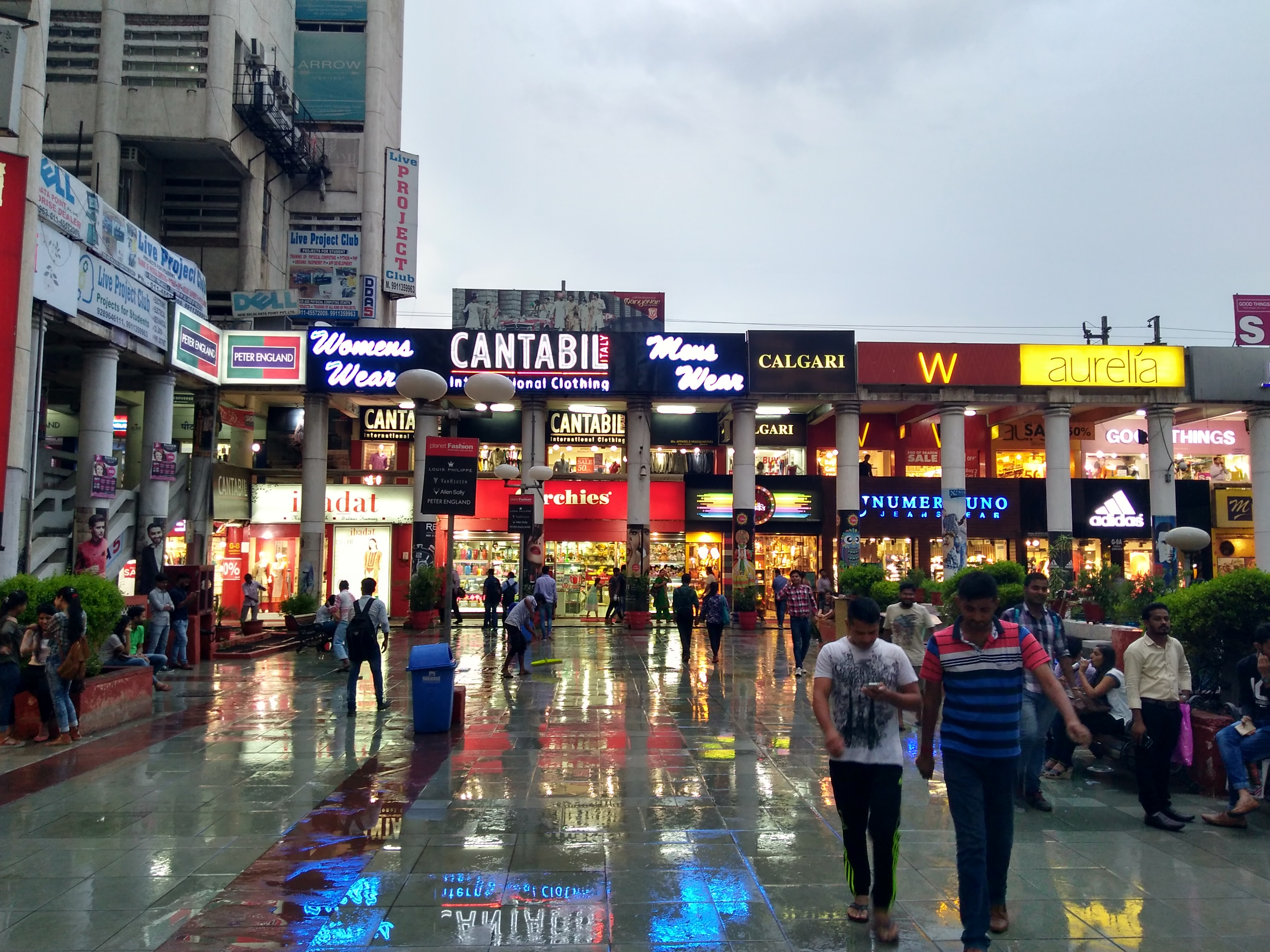
- Janak Place Shopping Complex

- Location in India
- Coordinates: 28°37′12″N 77°5′40″E
- Country: India
- State: Delhi
- District: South West Delhi

Government
  - Body: DDA

Population
  - Total: 700,000 (Including all housing societies)
- Time zone: UTC+5:30 (IST)
- PIN: 110058
- Vidhan Sabha Constituency: Janakpuri
- Civic Agency: MCD
- Member of Parliament: Kamaljeet Sehrawat (BJP)
- Member of Legislative Assembly: Ashish Sood (BJP)

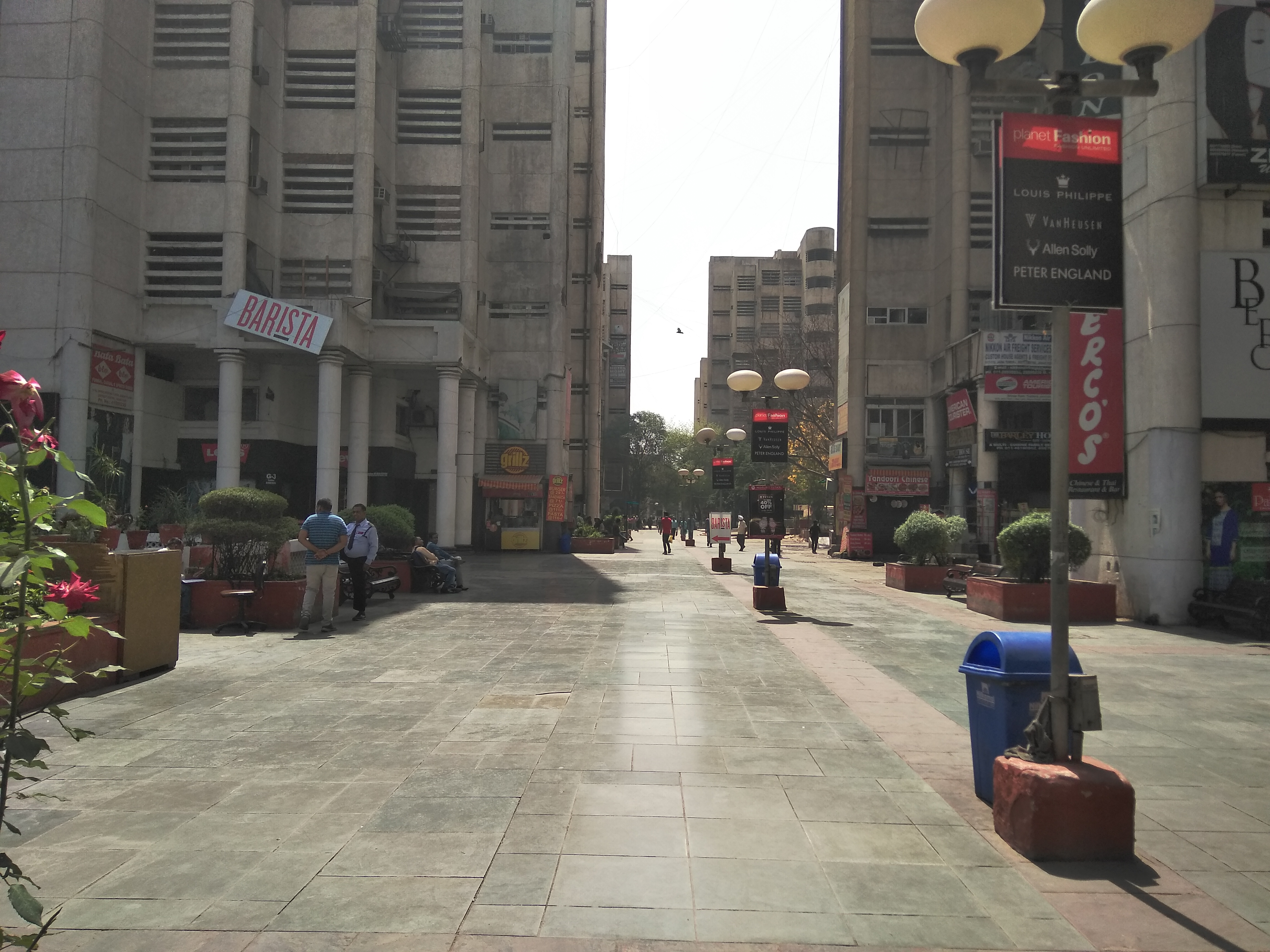
District Centre at Janak Puri

Janakpuri is an affluent neighborhood in the South West district of Delhi, India. It is located near the Delhi Cantonment area and is accessible by road and Delhi Metro via multiple lines as well as train because of its nearest railway station at Delhi Cantonment.

== Locality ==
Janakpuri was planned as the largest residential colony in Asia in late 1960s and has a large number of parks in each pocket of the locality and is a well structured city. The Janakpuri District Park is a managed green land-mass. It was built on the acquired lands.

The present geographical structure of the Janakpuri constituency came into existence in 2008 as a part of the implementation of the recommendations of the Delimitation Commission of India constituted in 2002.

The main commercial centre is the Janakpuri District Centre, which houses regional offices of companies and firms as well as shops selling food, apparel, handicrafts and jewellery. A "crafts bazaar" within the complex sells handicrafts and home decor items.

Janakpuri is a part of the South West Delhi Lok Sabha constituency along with nine other Vidhan Sabha segments. Shri Ashish Sood is the Member of the Legislative Assembly in the 8th Delhi Assembly from Janakpuri Assembly constituency.

There are various religious places for worship in Janakpuri at blocks A, B, C and D. Sanatan Dharam Mandir and Gurudwara are at Ram Mandir Marg as well as Sanatan Dharam Mandir, Arya Samaj Mandir, Gurudwara, Church are on the Dharam Marg.

Janakpuri is also popular for its weekly Saturday market which is one of the largest markets organised on blocks C4-B, C4-C, C4-D, C4-E, C4-F and C4-G as well as C3 on Ram Mandir Marg.

== Establishments ==
Janakpuri has a fire station adjacent to the Janakpuri Super Speciality Hospital on the Lal Sai Mandir Marg.

There are small and medium-sized hospitals and medical centres. Janakpuri Super Speciality Hospital, a government-operated hospital, is also located in the locality and has been operational since September 2008. Dada Dev Matri Avum Shishu Chikitsalya is also adjacent and near to Janakpuri. Dispensaries in various blocks are available like in the C4 Block.

Janakpuri Authority Office is near to the District Center where the Sub-Registrar Office is located and facilitates various government official works related to the district.

Janakpuri has post offices for each block to facilitate its citizens. For the Aadhaar card and passport services, there is a facility available in the designated post office.

Various public and private sector banks are in Janakpuri, which not only facilitate its residents but also help people in the commercial sector.

BSES Rajdhani Delhi manage electricity supply and Delhi Jal Board ensures the water supply in the locality.

Libraries have been established in Janakpuri by the Delhi Government.

There are various Mother Dairy and Amul booths in Janakpuri. Almost every block has such booths for milk, curd, dairy products and vegetables as well as fruits.

== Connectivity ==
Janakpuri is connected by the Outer Ring Road to the other parts in Northwest and North Delhi like Rohini, Pitampura, and Wazirabad through elevated corridors. The Pankha road and the Vivekanand Setu connects Janakpuri to Uttam Nagar, Dwarka, Delhi Cantonment, Najafgarh, and Palam. The Dwarka Expressway connects the region to Gurugram, Chandigarh, Jaipur, and Mumbai.

The Hari Nagar Delhi Transport Corporation (DTC) Bus Depot is near to the locality of Janakpuri.

Janakpuri has connectivity via the metro through three Delhi Metro stations: Janakpuri East (Blue Line), Janakpuri West (Interchange station between Blue and Magenta lines), and Dabri Mor-Janakpuri South (Magenta Line).

== Education ==
The neighbourhood's schools include government and private Schools such as the Sarvodaya Vidyalayas, Kendriya Vidyalaya, MCD schools, Mira Model School, New Era Public School, D.T.E.A. Senior Secondary School, A.E.S. N. T. Rama Rao Memorial Senior Secondary School, St. Marks Senior Secondary Public School, St. Francis de Sales School, SS Mota Singh School, Lawrence Public School, and Sumermal Jain Public School.

Key institutions in and around Janakpuri include:

- Bharti College, a constituent women's college under the University of Delhi.
- Maharaja Surajmal Institute (affiliated with GGSIPU)

== Green Zones ==
The flora and fauna in India are diverse with a variety of plants and animal varieties. Janakpuri has lot of green zones maintaining flora and fauna. These green zones predominantly have eucalyptus trees throughout which makes the environment pleasant and pollution free. Also, the Dusshera Ground, B-Block District Park and C4 Block District Park are popular in the area for walk, workout and picnic. In B-Block District Park, there is a musical fountain arrangement and a facility for the food shops.

== Tihar Jail ==
The Tihar Central Jail was set up in 1958 on the land near the Tihar Village which later came under the Janakpuri jurisdiction. In the beginning, only one Central Jail was commissioned with the lodging capacity of 1273 prisoners. The prison population gradually grew and today as many as 11,000 inmates are lodged here. The Tihar Central Jail was later developed into a prison complex which became the largest prison complex in Asia. The prison complex has nine central jails apart from a district jail at Rohini and Mandoli, which was commissioned in 2004 and 2010, respectively.
