= Hasanpur tehsil =

Tehsil of Amroha district of Uttar Pradesh state of India

- Tehsil
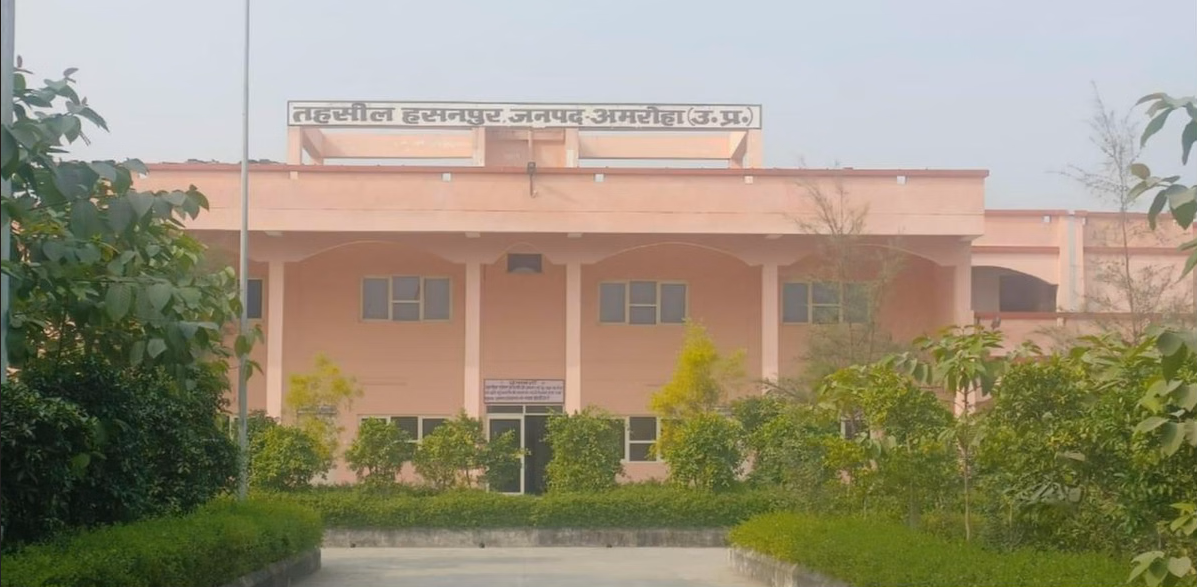
- Hasanpur Tehsil Headquarters Building.

- Location in Uttar Pradesh, India Hasanpur tehsil (India)
- Coordinates: 28.72°N 78.28°E
- Country: India
- State: Uttar Pradesh
- District: Amroha district
- Headquarters: Hasanpur

Area
  - Total: 903 km^{2} (349 sq mi)

Population (2011)
  - Total: 595,917
  - Density: 660/km^{2} (1,710/sq mi)

Languages
  - Official: Hindi, Urdu
- Time zone: UTC+5:30 (IST)
- Vehicle registration: UP-23
- Total villages: 379

Hasanpur tehsil is an administrative subdivision of Amroha district in the state of Uttar Pradesh, India. The tehsil headquarters is located at the town of Hasanpur. It is one of the four tehsils of the district, the others being Amroha, Dhanaura and Naugawan Sadat.

== Geography ==
Hasanpur tehsil lies in western Uttar Pradesh within Amroha district. The tehsil covers an area of 903 km².

== River ==
The subdivision is located in close proximity to the Ganga River, which flows along its western boundary. The river plays a vital role in the local ecology and economy, making the surrounding plains highly fertile for cultivating major crops like sugarcane, wheat, and paddy. The low-lying floodplains near the river, locally referred to as the Khadir region, are extensively utilized by the local population for seasonal farming and fruit orchards.

== Administration ==
Hasanpur serves as the tehsil headquarters. The subdivision includes:

- Hasanpur (Nagar Palika Parishad)
- Ujhari (Nagar Panchayat)
- 378 villages spread across the tehsil.
List of all 379 villages in Hasanpur Tehsil (Click 'Expand' to view)

S.No.	Village Name	Village Code
1	Akbarpur Sharki	118399
2	Akhtiyarpur A.Z.M.	118491
3	Akhtiyarpur M.J.A.	118492
4	Agraulakalan	118333
5	Agraulakhurd	118368
6	Abdipur	118247
7	Alauddinpur	118314
8	Allipur Khadar	118326
9	Allipur Bhur Sharki	118319
10	Ahrola Ahmadyar Khan	118289
11	Agapur Kalan	118242
12	Azadpur Mafi	118199
13	Adampur	118526
14	Alampur	118231
15	Ibrahimpur Khadar	118561
16	Ibrahimpur Chak	118558
17	Ekauna	118536
18	Ekaunda	118387
19	Eta	118500
20	Imratpur	118570
21	Iradatpur urf Alawalpur	118294
22	Ishapur Sharki	118379
23	Ujhari	217887
24	Udhanpur	118260
25	Umarpur	118286
26	Ukawali M. Sabik	118475
27	Ukawali M. Hal	118474
28	Ogpura	118504
29	Augarpur	118519
30	Ausamafi	118299
31	Ausita Aehtamali	118197
32	Ausita M.J.A.	118208
33	Kakruba	118386
34	Katai	118230
35	Kanaita	118362
36	Kandauwa	118448
37	Kabirpur A.	118214
38	Kamanpur	118317
39	Kamalpur Rani	118524
40	Kamalpur Sahu	118384
41	Karankhal	118344
42	Karanpur Khadar	118568
43	Karanpur Mafi	118339
44	Kalalkheda	118295
45	Kai A.	118545
46	Kai Mustahkam	118546
47	Kakather	118198
48	Kalakheda	118352
49	Kasampur Janubi	118367
50	Kasamabad A.	118210
51	Kuandali	118370
52	Kudarsi	118510
53	Kudaina Chak	118205
54	Kudaini	118204
55	Kundarki Bhur	118302
56	Kudi Veeran	118340
57	Kuvi	118268
58	Kokapur	118521
59	Kota	118273
60	Khajuri	118253
61	Khadakpur A.	118209
62	Khanaura	118497
63	Kharkhali A.	118321
64	Kharkhoda A.	118462
65	Kharkhoda M.	118461
66	Khargrani	118541
67	Kharsauli	118415
68	Khaikheda Bhur	118358
69	Khanpur	118222
70	Khapidi (Kharpadi)	118537
71	Khugavali	118201
72	Khuratiya	118479
73	Khailiya Khalsa	118499
74	Khailiya Patti	118505
75	Khyalipur	118202
76	Khwajepur	118554
77	Gangwar	118445
78	Gangacholi A.	118419
79	Gangacholi M.	118420
80	Gangeshwari	118495
81	Galsua	118382
82	Gangat Kola	118435
83	Garavpur / Rustampur	118412
84	Galsa	118320
85	Guretha	118565
86	Gulampur	118427
87	Ghansurpur Khalsa	118346
88	Gharont	118275
89	Ghosipura	118272
90	Chak Ghulam Ambiya	118404
91	Chakferi	118532
92	Chakauri	118291
93	Chachaura	118544
94	Chandan Kota	118513
95	Chandanpur Khadar	118478
96	Chamarpatei	118364
97	Chandan Khedi	118238
98	Chandpur	118313
99	Chila A.	118482
100	Chaukuni	118413
101	Chaubara	118224
102	Chhapna	118477
103	Chhoya	118227
104	Jagdeypur A.	118196
105	Jatpura Moharsingh	118509
106	Jatpura Sharki	118308
107	Jaytoli M.	118434
108	Jalalpur Khurd	118270
109	Jallopur A.	118469
110	Jallopur M.	118468
111	Jajaroul A.	118215
112	Jivpur M.	118555
113	Jivpur Sabik A.	118562
114	Jihal	118301
115	Jujharpur	118452
116	Jewada A.	118458
117	Jewada M.	118459
118	Jaytoli A.	118433
119	Jhundi Mafi	118360
120	Jhulpuri	118251
121	Jhotna	118329
122	Tanda	118244
123	Dagarpuri	118237
124	Dagarouli	118347
125	Domkheda	118338
126	Dhakiya Khadar	118449
127	Dhakka	118309
128	Dhabarsi	118508
129	Dhekla	118535
130	Tatarpur Patti	118393
131	Tarara	118373
132	Tarauli	118476
133	Talabada	118569
134	Tasiha	118282
135	Tajpur Dungar	118365
136	Taharpur	118257
137	Tigriya Khadar	118219
138	Tigriya Nadirshah	118516
139	Timanpur	118318
140	Tuklababad	118288
141	Turtipur	118410
142	Telipura Khalsa	118283
143	Telipura Mafi	118252
144	Trilokpur Tugan	118285
145	Dariyal	118564
146	Damgadha	118530
147	Damgadhi	118397
148	Dariyapur Khadar	118213
149	Dariyapur	118520
150	Daudpur Jagir	118355
151	Daudpur Buzurg	118221
152	Daudpur Majra	118310
153	Daudpur Mahrunisha	118276
154	Diyavali Khalsa	118325
155	Dippur	118336
156	Dulhapur Ahir	118511
157	Dulhapur Veeran	118279
158	Dehra	118303
159	Dehri Khadar	118566
160	Dehri Gujar A.	118463
161	Dehri Gujar M.	118464
162	Dehri Jat	118266
163	Daurara	118498
164	Daulatpur Kalan	118447
165	Daulatpur Janubi	118552
166	Daulatpur Nahri	118267
167	Dhansiya	118392
168	Dhanapur	118517
169	Dharangpur	118264
170	Dhimarkhedi	118330
171	Dhauriya Aehtamali	118217
172	Nangla Khadar	118502
173	Nangla Shumali	118246
174	Nangliya Jat	118269
175	Nangliya Munshi	118298
176	Nawabpura Khadar	118466
177	Navada	118411
178	Nasirpur Muntasir Yaqub	118259
179	Nanai Lisada A.	118496
180	Nanai Lisada M.	118473
181	Nijampur Sharki	118385
182	Nijampur Shumali	118235
183	Niryavali	118453
184	Nurpur Khurd	118354
185	Nurpur Kalan	118287
186	Pandka	118400
187	Patei Khadar	118440
188	Patei Bhur	118256
189	Pathra Aehtamali	118480
190	Pathra M.	118481
191	Pasuva Nangla	118503
192	Pahadpur Bakkal	118361
193	Paindapur A.	118424
194	Paindapur M.	118431
195	Padli	118512
196	Piplauti Kalan A.	118423
197	Piplauti Kalan M.	118422
198	Piplauti Khurd A.	118425
199	Piplauti Khurd M.	118426
200	Pith Kheda	118284
201	Pipli Daud	118245
202	Pipli Bakkal	118378
203	Pipli Mek Chand	118271
204	Putsal	118405
205	Pursal	118531
206	Puthi	118243
207	Paurara A.	118493
208	Paurara M.	118494
209	Fatehpur Adhek	118528
210	Fatehpur Gujar Lavegang A.	118471
211	Fatehpur Khadar	118451
212	Fayyaz Nagar	118416
213	Farotan	118454
214	Firozpur Gadavali	118226
215	Firozpur Badlu	118450
216	Firozabad	118307
217	Phoolpur Bizhalpur	118350
218	Bagli	118312
219	Bachhi Kheda Kalan	118376
220	Bachhi Kheda Khurd	118377
221	Bartoura	118467
222	Bavanpur	118398
223	Basi Kalan	118334
224	Basi Sahsauli	118233
225	Baseda Khurd	118248
226	Bahadurpur G.M. Pur	118234
227	Bahadurpur Ghulam Mo. Khan	118277
228	Bahadurpur Missar	118542
229	Baikheda	118343
230	Bagadpur Chhoiya	118523
231	Bagadpur Munjabta	118406
232	Batupura	118203
233	Bala Nagal	118304
234	Bavan Khedi	118263
235	Bans Ka Kalan A.	118444
236	Bans Ka Khurd	118443
237	Bans Ka Madaripur	118441
238	Banhpur	118359
239	Bijnoura	118401
240	Bijoura	118211
241	Bilda A.	118216
242	Biharipur A.	118472
243	Bizhalpur	118539
244	Bukharipur	118514
245	Buravali	118455
246	Begpur Munda	118305
247	Begpur Sharki	118356
248	Brahampur Gujar Lave G.	118470
249	Brahampur Bhur	118297
250	Brahmabad	118293
251	Bhagwanpur Khadar	118200
252	Bhatoula Sharki	118380
253	Bhadaura	118296
254	Bhavli	118543
255	Bhikanpur Sharki	118357
256	Bhikanpur Shumali	118228
257	Bhima Thikri	118331
258	Bhulai	118389
259	Bhuvra	118538
260	Bhaisri	118501
261	Bhaisarouli	118421
262	Makanpur Sharki	118374
263	Makanpur Shumali	118250
264	Magta M.J.A.	118490
265	Mangta S. A.	118484
266	Mangaroula	118437
267	Mangarouli	118349
268	Machharai	118335
269	Machhariya	118460
270	Matipura	118442
271	Matena Aehtamali Hal	118324
272	Mataina M.S.	118323
273	Mathana	118332
274	Manauta	118241
275	Mansoorpur	217890
276	Maraura	118553
277	Malakpur Aehtamali Sabik	118550
278	Malakpur M.J.A.	118551
279	Machhra Bhagwanpur	118258
280	Mirzapur Janubi	118549
281	Mirzapur Dungar	118414
282	Mirzapur Sharki	118383
283	Mirpur Davka	118483
284	Muvarikpur Kalan	118342
285	Muvarijpur	118563
286	Mehdipur	118391
287	Mohammadpur Vagar	118290
288	Mohammadabad A.	118207
289	Mohammadabad M.	118206
290	Yaqubpur	118240
291	Rakheda	118212
292	Rajoha	118255
293	Rajheda	118278
294	Rahmatpur	118316
295	Rahrai	118534
296	Rahra	118533
297	Rajpur	118381
298	Raja Nangal	118292
299	Rajupur	118372
300	Rampur Bhur	118337
301	Raipur A.	118488
302	Raipur M.J.A.	118489
303	Rustampur Khadar	118436
304	Rukhalu	118429
305	Rupa Nagal	118407
306	Lathira Mafi	118348
307	Lalpur	118567
308	Lalapur	118457
309	Lisadi Buzurg	118229
310	Luhari Khadar	118327
311	Luhari Bhur	118280
312	Shakarouli	118428
313	Sharifpur Sharki	118311
314	Shahwajpur Dor	118218
315	Shahwajpur Dhola	118527
316	Shahawazpur Gujar A.	118438
317	Shahawazpur Gujar M.	118439
318	Shahpur urf Bhutkhadedi	118261
319	Shahpur Kalan	118345
320	Shahpur Dungar	118366
321	Shahpur Majra	118239
322	Shekhupura Sharki	118395
323	Shekhupur Jhakdi	118341
324	Shergarh	118249
325	Sakatpur Karanpur	118403
326	Sateda A.	118322
327	Sabdalpur Sharki	118390
328	Sabdalpur Shumali	118281
329	Samastpur Janubi	118518
330	Sarkada Khurd M.	118265
331	Sarkada Janubi	118409
332	Sarayan Ozhi	118396
333	Sarayan Majra	118315
334	Salara	118559
335	Shahdara Milak	118418
336	Saheriya	217898
337	Saheliya	118515
338	Santhalpur	118507
339	Sadullapur	118220
340	Sampa	217901
341	Sikandarpur Jhabbu	118522
342	Sikandrabad	118529
343	Simthala	118506
344	Sirsa Kalan A.Z.M.	118547
345	Sirsa Kalan A.S.	118548
346	Sirsa Gujar A.	118432
347	Sirsa Gujar M.	118430
348	Sihali Jagir	118232
349	Sikri Bhur	118417
350	Sitla Saraba	118525
351	Sutari	118402
352	Sutavali	118465
353	Sultanther Mo. Pur	118225
354	Sultanpur Bhima	118408
355	Sultanpur Maulvi	118223
356	Sultanpur Veeran	118351
357	Subra	118540
358	Sumather	118375
359	Semla	118236
360	Saidnangli	118388
361	Soharka	118328
362	Sauhat	118363
363	Hakimpur A.	118487
364	Haryana	118306
365	Halimpur	118274
366	Hasanpur Andar Chungi	217903
367	Hasanpur Bahar Chungi	217909
368	Hasanpur S.A.	118557
369	Hasanpur S.M.	118556
370	Hakampur	118446
371	Hajipur Khadar	118560
372	Hajipur Bhur	118262
373	Hafizpur	118254
374	Hirnauta	118456
375	Hees Kheda	118369
376	Husainpur	118394
377	Haiderpur A.	118486
378	Haiderpur M.J.A.	118485
379	Haivatpur Banjara	118353

== Demographics ==
According to the 2011 Census of India, Hasanpur tehsil had a population of 595,917, of which 312,423 were male and 283,494 were female. The rural population was about 510,186 and the urban population was about 85,731. The literacy rate was 47.69% (male 57.6%, female 36.7%).

=== Religion and language ===
At the district level, Hindus form the majority (about 69.32%) while Muslims constitute a significant minority (about 30.35%). Other religions together form less than 1%. The official language is Hindi and Urdu is also widely spoken.

== History ==
Hasanpur was part of Moradabad district until 1997, when Jyotiba Phule Nagar district was carved out. In 2012, the district was renamed Amroha district.

== Transport ==
The tehsil is connected by road to nearby towns and districts. National Highway 9 passes near Hasanpur, providing links to Delhi, Moradabad and Lucknow. Regular bus services operate from Hasanpur to district and state headquarters. The nearest railway stations include Amroha railway station and Moradabad railway station.

== Education ==
The tehsil has several schools and colleges affiliated to the Uttar Pradesh state education board. Notable institutions in and around Hasanpur include:

- Smt. Sukhdevi Inter College, Hasanpur
- Jawahar Inter College, Hasanpur
- R.K. Inter College, Ujhari
- Degree colleges affiliated with Mahatma Jyotiba Phule Rohilkhand University in nearby Bareilly district.

== Notable people ==
- Rajiv Kumar – Former Chief Election Commissioner of India; born in Hasanpur, Amroha district, Uttar Pradesh.
- Several local politicians and social workers from Hasanpur constituency have represented the area in the Uttar Pradesh Legislative Assembly.
