= Semla, Amroha =

Coordinates: 28.7849°N 78.2832°E

Semla (also Saimla) is a village under Hasanpur tehsil within Amroha district of Uttar Pradesh State, India. In older times it was known by the name of Samargarh.

It is said by the old of the village that the earthen pots of various types and colours were found when the earth was dug for setting up the pumping sets around the village. Those earthen pots are believed to have been of some old civilization.

As of 2011 it had a population of 1167. This is a Hindu-populated village. A caste of the village is Chauhan Rajput who belong to Kshtriya class of Hindus. Remaining population belong to Scheduled Caste. 71% of the population is literate.

The village is reached via Hasanpur (35 km away) or Gajraula. The village is located near Sambhal.
