= Burawali =

Village in Amroha, Uttar Pradesh, India

Burawali is a village in Gangeshwari Mandal, Amroha district, Uttar Pradesh state, India. The PIN code is 244241. Burawali is near Ujhari and Hasanpur.

== Description ==
This village is famous for its 'bazaar', a weekly market on every Monday. People from nearby villages also visit this weekly market to get their basic essentials, needs & groceries.

The village is also famous as it has two petrol pumps and one sugar mill. The village has facilities to purchase general agricultural animals, including goats and buffaloes.
