= Maikal Chandra =

Indian politician

MLA, 16th Legislative Assembly
- In office March 2012 – March 2017
- Preceded by: None
- Succeeded by: Rajeev Tarara
- Constituency: Dhanaura

Personal details
- Born: 1 July 1945 (age 81) Dhanaura, Uttar Pradesh
- Died: 14-01-2019 mandi dhanaura
- Citizenship: India
- Party: Samajwadi Party
- Parent: S Chandra (father)
- Profession: Politician

Maikal Chandra is an Indian politician and a member of the 16th Legislative Assembly of Uttar Pradesh. He represents the Dhanaura constituency of Uttar Pradesh and is a member of the Samajwadi Party.

== Early life and education ==
Maikal Chandra was born in Dhanaura, Amroha, Uttar Pradesh. He holds Master of Arts degree. Chandra belongs to the scheduled caste community.

== Political career ==
Maikal Chandra has been a MLA for one term. He represented the Dhanaura constituency and is a member of the Samajwadi Party.

== Posts held ==
#	From	To	Position	Comments
01	March 2012	March 2017	Member, 16th Legislative Assembly	

== See also ==
- Dhanaura
- Politics of India
- Sixteenth Legislative Assembly of Uttar Pradesh
- Uttar Pradesh Legislative Assembly
