= Mahender Singh Khadakvanshi =

Indian politician

Member of the Uttar Pradesh Legislative Assembly
- Incumbent
- Assumed office 2017
- Preceded by: Kamal Akhtar
- Constituency: Hasanpur

Personal details
- Party: Bharatiya Janata Party
- Profession: Politician

Mahender Singh Khadakvanshi is an Indian politician and a member of the 17th Legislative Assembly of Uttar Pradesh in India. He represents the Hasanpur (Assembly constituency), which is in Amroha district, Uttar Pradesh.
