= Amroha murder case =

2008 family murder in Uttar Pradesh, India

- Location: Bawankhedi village in Hasanpur tehsil of Amroha, Uttar Pradesh, India.
- Date: April 15, 2008; 18 years ago
- Attack type: Familicide, murder
- Deaths: 7
- Perpetrators: Shabnam Ali and Saleem
- Verdict: Guilty

Amroha murder case refers to an April 2008 familicide in Amroha, Uttar Pradesh, India, by Shabnam Ali and her lover Saleem, who murdered seven members of Shabnam Ali's family by sedating six of them and then slicing their throat with an axe; the seventh victim, a ten-month-old baby was murdered unsedated.

== Hanging ==
Media reports in February 2021 stated that Shabnam Ali is likely to be the first woman to be hanged in independent India. The Governor of Uttar Pradesh as well as the President of India rejected Shabnam Ali's mercy petition. Now her 12-year-old son Muhmmed Taj has requested the President of India to cancel her punishment.

== Victims ==
Name	Shabnam's Relation	Age
Shaukat Ali	Father	55
Hashmi	Mother	50
Anees	Elder brother	35
Anjum	Sister in law	25
Rashid	Younger brother	22
Rabia	Cousin	14
Arsh	Nephew	10 months
