= Iqbal Mehdi =

Iqbal Mehdi may refer to:

- Eqbal Mehdi (1946–2008), Pakistani painter
- Iqbal Mehdi (politician), Pakistani politician
