= Gajraula Nuns rape case =

1990 rape and robbery case in India

Gajraula rape case
- Date: July 12, 1990
- Location: Gajraula
- Motive: Unknown
- Perpetrator: Unknown
- Accused: 4 (later acquitted by Supreme court of India)

The Gajraula Nuns rape case is an unsolved rape and robbery case from the town of Gajraula in Uttar Pradesh. It occurred in the night of July 12, 1990, around 2 a.m. in the premises of St. Mary school. Six nuns were assaulted and two were raped and a total of 110,000 rupees were stolen. The case caught national attention when the media started reporting about it on July 22, 1990. Due to massive protests and pressure from Christian groups then Uttar Pradesh Chief minister Mulayam Singh Yadav declared 2 lakh rupees compensation to the two nuns who were raped and promised for immediate action. Four people were arrested by the Uttar Pradesh Police with three wristwatches which the police claimed to have been stolen on the night. The Supreme Court later acquitted the four men after the nuns said that they were not the culprit and they were being forced to accept them as the culprit. The case was given to Central Bureau of Investigation with only three months to investigate and file a Chargesheet.

== The incident ==
On the nights of July 12 and 13, the robbery and rape of six nuns and a maid occurred at a convent while the nuns were asleep. Three men of dark complexion broke into the convent through a kitchen window by forcefully removing an iron rod. They were armed and minimally dressed, with two wearing only underwear and one in both underwear and an undershirt.

The assailants first attacked the maid, forcibly taking her earrings and wristwatch. They then entered the room where six nuns were sleeping. Brandishing iron rods, knives, and sticks, they threatened the nuns, confining five of them in the room while their leader took one nun to another room and raped her. When the nuns locked in the room began to cry, the guard at the door beat them and threatened them with death.

The leader then took another nun and raped her as well. The three men subsequently assaulted the remaining nuns, broke into the almirah containing salary funds, and fled with the stolen money.

== Aftermath ==
On July 13, 1990, at 6.20 a.m. sister Floreena, principal of St. Mary's School lodged First Information Report at Police Station Gajraula where she described the incident. The nuns initially did not want to publicize the case but the national media made it a major issue. Many Christian groups met and requested the then Minister of Defence George Fernandes for immediate intervention he promised them of arresting the culprits and provide help to the nuns. CM Mulayam Singh and their Ministers were at first denying that there were any rapes but later they had to accept when Christian group started putting pressure on the government. The police arrested four individuals with three wristwatches but they were later acquitted when the nuns challenged the police's findings in the supreme court and accused them of pressurizing them into accepting that those four men were the culprit. The Supreme Court transferred the case to CBI and asked them to complete the investigation in 3 months. The case remains unsolved and there have been no new updates by the CBI or the Police.
