= Shiv Narayan Singh Chauhan =

Indian politician (born 1950)

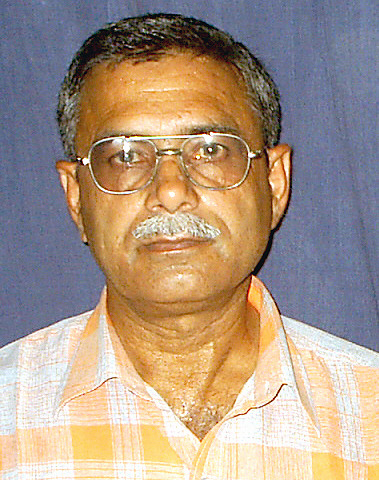
- Born: 1950 (age 74–75); Gajraula, Uttar Pradesh, India
- Years active: 1981–present
- Title: State President and National Secretary
- Children: 2

Shiv Narayan Singh Chauhan (b. 1950) is an Indian politician. He is the State General Secretary, All India Forward Bloc, Uttar Pradesh
