= Khagi =

Khagi Rajput
Regions with significant populations
- India

Languages
- • Hindi • Khari boli

Religion
- • Hinduism 100% •

The Khagi are a Rajput caste found mainly in the western region of Uttar Pradesh in India.The Khagi community resided in most areas of the Katehar region (Katehar was a historic region of north-western Uttar Pradesh, bordered by the Ganga, Kumaon hills, and Awadh, covering most of present-day Rohilkhand.”), with settlements spread across its plains and forested zones.

== Origin ==
The word Khagi is said to be derived from the Sanskrit Khadgika, which means "swordsman." According to the community's tradition, they belong to the Kshatriya Rajput community. They were originally from the Sisodias of Mewar and the Chauhan of Ajmer, who emigrated under their leaders, Kanka and Mahesa. These leaders left their homeland as a result of a famine and settled in the town of Sahaswan in Badaun District. Most Khagis use the surname Rana (राणा), a hereditary honorific used by the Sisodia Rajputs of Mewar. The Khagi community resided in most areas of the Katehar region, with settlements spread across its plains and forested zones.

The Khagis became local rulers but eventually fell out with a Sultan of Delhi, who sent a force to suppress them. They suffered defeat, their estates were confiscated, and they were forced to become cultivators. The community also practiced widow remarriage—a custom not followed by other Rajput communities—which led them to evolve into a distinct community. The Katehar region witnessed frequent conflicts between Rajput chiefs and the Mughal authorities, as local Rajput clans repeatedly resisted Mughal control due to the region’s dense forests, difficult terrain, and strong tradition of autonomy.

Origin of word "Khagi" and Katheriya Rajputs (कठेरिया राजपूत).

The Katehar region derived its name from the Katheriya Rajputs, who were the original Rajput inhabitants of this area. Community accounts further indicate that for several centuries these Rajputs residing in Kather region (On the south-western boundary of Kather lay the Ganga River; to the north was the hilly region of Kumaon; and to the east was the Avadh region. This territory included almost the entire area of present-day Rohilkhand) were involved in sustained resistance against the Delhi Sultanate. As a result, they were subject to surveillance and military pursuit by Sultanate forces. In response to these pressures, it is believed that the community adopted the name “Khagi” as a protective social strategy, enabling members to obscure their lineage and avoid targeted identification. Over the centuries of resisting the Mughals, these Rajputs gradually lost much of their power and often engaged in guerrilla-style warfare, it was crucial for them to hide their true identity. Mughals frequently massacred entire villages of these Rajputs, making secrecy a matter of survival. Yet, the community still needed a way to recognize one another, so they adopted the name “Khagi” instead of identifying openly as Rajputs. Over time, this designation became widely associated with Rajput groups residing in regions of Uttar Pradesh surrounding Delhi, while the memory of their Katheriya origin was preserved primarily through oral transmission and internal community records.

Katehar Or Katghar (Moradabad) and the Katheriya–Khagi Rajput Tradition

Local tradition and community narratives suggest that the Katghar locality of Moradabad was once a significant settlement of the Katheriya (Katheria) Rajputs. During the early historical period, this area is believed to have been inhabited by Katheriya Rajput families, who are traditionally identified as a Kshatriya (Rajput) community engaged in both martial and agrarian activities. Based on oral history and regional belief, the place name “Katghar” is thought to have evolved linguistically from “Katheri” or “Katheriya,” reflecting the long-standing presence of this community in the region. Such toponymic developments—where settlement names derive from dominant or early inhabitants—are well documented in North Indian historical geography, although direct archival evidence for this specific transformation remains limited. These Rajput lived in the Kather region (On the south-western boundary of Kather lay the Ganga River; to the north was the hilly region of Kumaon; and to the east was the Avadh region. This territory included almost the entire area of present-day Rohilkhand). Local historical tradition attributes the foundation of Rampur district in Uttar Pradesh to Raja Ram Singh, identified in community narratives as a Katheriya Rajput. The name “Rampur” is traditionally believed to have originated from the founder’s name, in keeping with established patterns of place-name formation in medieval North India. Kather region was named Rohilkhand afterwards when Rohilla rule began in the early 18th century, led by Ali Muhammad Khan Rohilla. He consolidated Afghan (Rohilla) power in the region around the 1720s–1730s, and in 1737 he was formally recognized by the Mughal Empire as the ruler (governor) of Rohilkhand.After the establishment of Rohilla rule, the term “Kather” fell out of use, and for this region the name “Rohilkhand” (in English) or “Rohilkhand” (in Urdu and Hindi) came into common usage.

Balban’s Invasion - 1254

During the reign of Ghiyasuddin Balban (1254 century), in places such as Sambhal, Badaun, and Amroha, the Rajputs openly rebelled against the Sultanate. To suppress them, Balban personally marched from Delhi and advanced so swiftly that he left his camp behind, reaching Kather on the third day. He brought an army of five thousand and ordered his commanders to burn Kather to the ground and devastate it completely, sparing neither women nor children, and killing even boys as young as nine years old.

The historian Barani, writing during the reign of Firoz Shah Tughlaq, mentions this campaign and notes that Balban stayed in Kather for several days, issuing strict and personal orders. Extreme brutality followed, instilling terror in the hearts of the people. Village after village was destroyed, and heaps of corpses could be seen everywhere. Even the forests were filled with bodies, and the stench of the dead spread as far as the Ganga. The entire Kather region was crushed and plundered.

Rise of Rao Khadag Singh - 1291

In many regions of India, especially Rajasthan and Gujarat, “Rao” was used instead of “Raja” as an honorary title for Rajput rulers or chiefs, essentially signifying the same authority. Raja Khadag singh Or Rao khadag singh was a kathoriya rajput. After balban, Jalaluddin invaded, Katheriya rajput regions (On the south-western boundary of Kather lay the Ganga River; to the north was the hilly region of Kumaon; and to the east was the Avadh region. This territory included almost the entire area of present-day Rohilkhand). However, during the reign of Firoz Shah Tughlaq, Raja Gunraj Shakrawal was killed. A new warrior, Rao Khadag Singh, rose to prominence. He conquered the region north of Delhi and declared his authority. He extended his control from Rajgarh (present-day Alwar) to Hansi city, and from Bawal to Jalore, bringing the entire region from Ranaghat to Sharda under his dominion. At that time, Badayu was under the rule of Subedar Sayyad Mahmud. Rao Khadag Singh killed him and his brother and rebelled against the Delhi Sultanate. When Sultan Firoz Shah Tughlaq received this information, he attacked. Rao Khadag Singh fled from Kulwala lake and took refuge in the hills of Kumbhalgarh.

Association these Rajputs to Kadagvanshi

After that, Rao Khadag Singh is associated in community tradition with political authority in parts of Rohilkhand. Following this period, sections of the community began identifying themselves as Khadagvanshi, a lineage designation linked to the symbolic importance of the khadag (sword) in Rajput martial culture and to Rao Khadag Singh who gained the lost power of these Rajputs.

History of the Katehar (Kather) Region

The Katehar region, also known historically as Kather, was an important territorial and cultural area of medieval North India. It lay in the north-western part of present-day Uttar Pradesh and roughly corresponds to almost the entire modern Rohilkhand region.

Geographical Boundaries Katehar was strategically located and defined by natural and political boundaries: South-west: The Ganga River, which formed a natural frontier North: The hilly region of Kumaon (present-day Uttarakhand) East: The Avadh (Awadh) region West: The upper Doab and foothills of the Himalayas

Because of these boundaries, Katehar served as a buffer zone between the plains of the Ganga and the Himalayan foothills.

Early History and Rajput Rule

In early medieval times, Katehar was largely dominated by Rajput clans, especially:

Katehriya / Katheriya Rajputs Other Chauhan, Rathore, and local Rajput lineages The region derived its name “Katehar” from the Katheriya (Katehriya) Rajputs, who were prominent landholders and warriors here. Dense forests, rivers, and marshy lands made the region difficult to conquer, allowing local chiefs a high degree of autonomy.

Medieval Period

During the Delhi Sultanate (13th–15th centuries), Katehar was known for: Frequent resistance to central authority Forest-based warfare and rebellions Semi-independent Rajput chieftains Because of continuous uprisings, the region was considered turbulent and hard to control by Sultanate rulers.

Mughal Period Under the Mughal Empire, Katehar remained important due to: Its agricultural fertility Strategic location near the Himalayan passes

Mughal emperors attempted to bring Katehar under firm control through military campaigns and administrative reforms. Over time, many Rajput chiefs were subdued or absorbed into the Mughal mansabdari system.

Rise of Rohillas and Transformation into Rohilkhand

In the 17th–18th centuries, Afghan Rohilla chiefs migrated into the region. Gradually: Rohillas gained political dominance. The name Katehar was replaced by Rohilkhand. Rajput power declined, though many remained as zamindars

Historical Significance

Katehar holds historical importance because:

It represents a transition zone between hills and plains It shows the shift from Rajput dominance to Afghan rule It played a key role in shaping the identity of Rohilkhand

== Clans and Subdivisons ==
The Khagis are a strictly endogamous community and practice clan exogamy. Their main clans are Tomar, Baiswar, Bais, Rusiya, Sisodiya, Sikarwar, Chauhan, Bhati, Chandel, Kachhwaha, Imratpuriya Khadagvanshi, Badgujar, and Raghuvanshi. Each of these clans is of equal status, and they intermarry.

== Present circumstances ==
The Khagis are small- and medium-sized farmers and tend to occupy their own villages. They are found mainly in Badaun, Moradabad, and Jyotiba Phule Nagar in Rohilkhand, as well as in Rampur and Sambhal. There are also settlements in Etah and Mainpuri districts. Their customs are similar to those of the Hindu cultivating castes of the region.
