= Rajeev Tarara =

Indian politician

Member of the Uttar Pradesh legislative assembly
- Incumbent
- Assumed office March 2017
- Preceded by: Maikal Chandra
- Constituency: Dhanaura

Personal details
- Born: 2 January 1981 (age 45) Tarara, Amroha, Uttar Pradesh
- Citizenship: India
- Party: Bharatiya Janata Party
- Education: M.A.; BEd; L.L.B.
- Occupation: MLA
- Profession: Politician; Agriculture

Rajeev Tarara is an Indian politician and a member of 17th Legislative Assembly of Uttar Pradesh of India. He represents the Dhanaura (Assembly constituency) in Amroha district of Uttar Pradesh and is a member of the Bharatiya Janata Party.

== Early life and education ==
Tarara was born 2 January 1981 in the Tarara village in Amroha district of Uttar Pradesh to father Totaram. He is unmarried till now. He belongs to Scheduled Caste (Jatav) community. He had three-degrees, M.A., BEd, L.L.B. He is an agriculturist by profession. Since 2007, he also had a Manager post in Krishna Public School Amroha.

== Political career ==
Tarara started his journey in politics with 17th Legislative Assembly of Uttar Pradesh (2017) elections, he got ticket by Bharatiya Janata Party from Dhanaura (Assembly constituency). He was successful in the legislature in the first attempt and elected MLA by defeating Samajwadi Party candidate Jagram Singh by a margin of 38,229 votes.

== Posts held ==
| # | From | To | Position | Comments |
|---|---|---|---|---|
| 01 | March 2017 | Incumbent | Member, 17th Legislative Assembly of Uttar Pradesh | |
