= Syed Nagli =

Said Nagli सैद नगली Said Nagli
- Town
- Location within Uttar Pradesh Location within India
- Coordinates: 28.72°N 78.28°E
- Country: India
- State: Uttar Pradesh
- District: Amroha district
- Elevation: 201 m (659 ft)

Population (2011)
  - Total: 12,160
- Time zone: UTC+5:30 (IST)
- PIN: 244242
- Telephone code: 05924
- Vehicle registration: UP 23
- Website: https://amroha.nic.in/public-utility/post-office-said-nagli-pin-code-244242/

Said Nagli is a town in Amroha district in the Indian state of Uttar Pradesh. It is situated on State Highway 51, around 15 km from Hasanpur and 19 km from Sambhal. Said Nagli has its own post office with PIN code 244242 and a police station.

== Geography ==
Said Nagli is located at 28.40°N 78.23°E. It has an average elevation of 201 metres (659 ft).

== Demographics ==
As of the 2011 Indian Census, the town of Said Nagli had a total population of 12,160, of which 6,369 were males and 5,791 females. Population within the age group of 0 to 6 years was 1,972. The literate citizens in Said Nagli were 6,644 (54.6% of the population) with male literacy at 61.6% and female literacy at 47.0%. The effective literacy rate of 7+ population of Said Nagli was 65.2%, of which male literacy rate was 73.5% and female literacy rate 56.1%. The Scheduled Castes population was 1,094. Syed Nagli had 30,460 households in 2014.

== Education ==
=== School Education (K-12) ===
Schools in this town include Saraswati Vidya Mandir, Shankar Inter College.

=== Higher Education ===
Colleges such as Musavvir Hussain Baqri Memorial Degree College, NT degree college are there to provide degrees in normal BA and BSc.

== Transport ==
=== Road ===
Said Nagli is connected by road to the towns of Sambhal, Hasanpur, Gajraula, Moradabad and Budaun.

=== Rail ===
Said Nagli's nearest railway station is in Gajraula. Gajraula Railway station is approximately 28 kilometres (17 miles) away via SH 51. Other railway station include Moradabad railway station, which is approximately 47 km via Chaudharpur way.

=== Air ===
Said Nagli's nearest major airport is Indira Gandhi International Airport, Delhi. It is approximately 160 kilometres (99 miles) via SH 51 and NH24 (AH2).
