= Amroha railway station =

Railway Station in Uttar Pradesh, India

General information
- Location: State Highway 78, Danishmandan, Amroha, Uttar Pradesh; India
- Coordinates: 28.8926°N 78.4754°E
- Elevation: 216 metres (709 ft)
- System: Indian Railways station
- Owner: Indian Railways
- Operator: Northern Railway
- Line: Delhi–Moradabad line
- Platforms: 3
- Tracks: 4 (double electrified BG)
- Connections: Auto stand

Construction
- Structure type: Standard (on-ground station)
- Parking: No
- Cycle facilities: No

Other information
- Status: Functioning
- Station code: AMRO
- Zone(s): Northern Railway
- Division(s): Moradabad

History
- Opened: 1885
Location
- Location within India Location within Uttar Pradesh

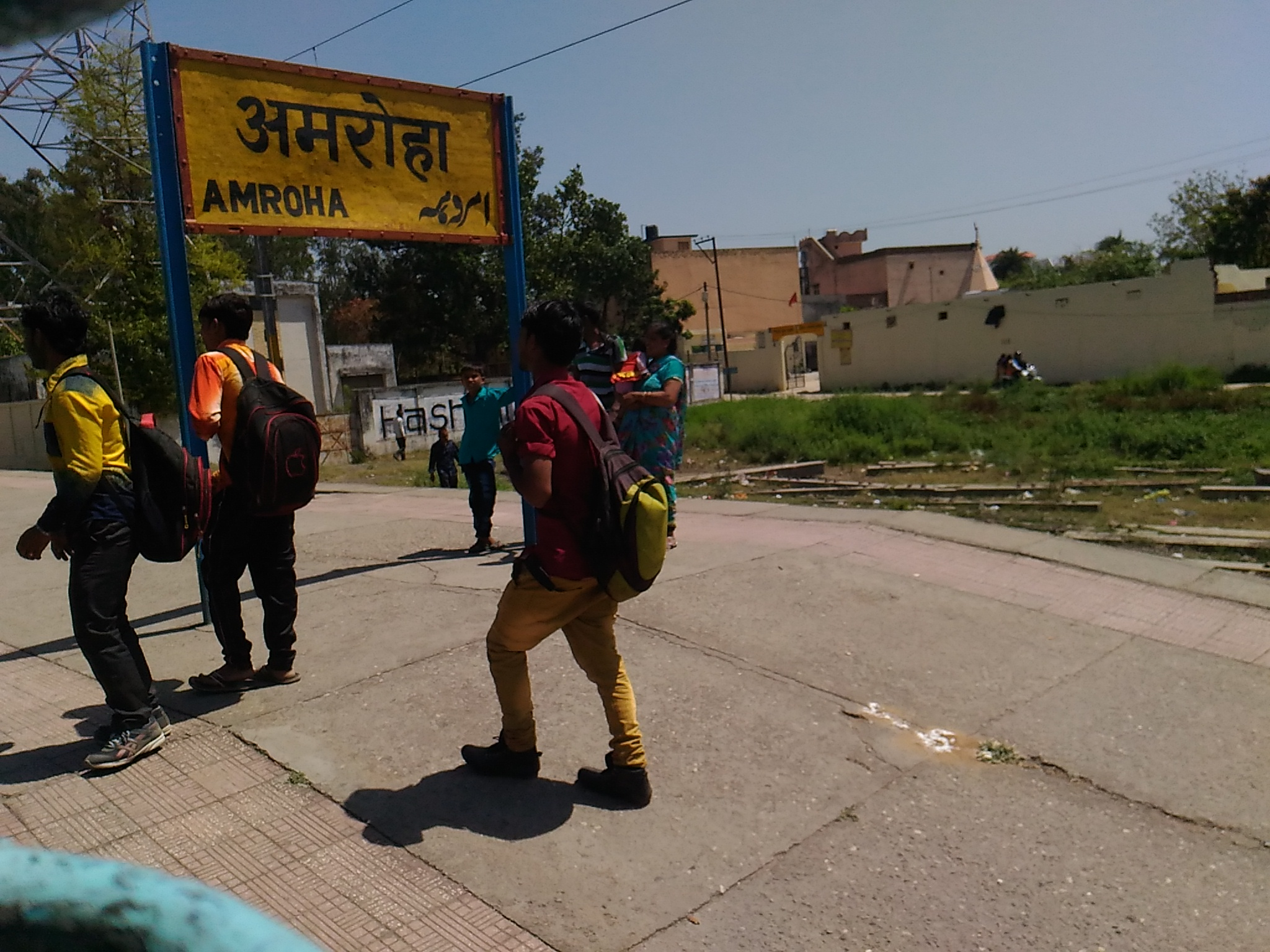
passengers at Amroha railway station

Amroha railway station is a main railway station in Amroha district, Uttar Pradesh established in 1885. Its code is AMRO. It serves Amroha city. The station consists of three platforms. The platforms are not well sheltered. It lacks many facilities including water and sanitation.

The station is situated on the Delhi–Moradabad line by Oudh and Rohilkhand Railway and all passenger trains and most of the express trains stop here.

== Trains ==
Some of the trains that run from Amroha are:

- Sadbhawna Express
- Ala Hazrat Express
- Avadh Assam Express
- New Delhi–Bareilly Intercity Express
- Himachal Express
- Kashi Vishwanath Express
- Nauchandi Express
- Lucknow–Chandigarh Express (via Gajraula)
- Saryu Yamuna Express
- Shaheed Express
- Loknayak Express
- Satyagraha Express
- Anand Vihar–Moradabad MEMU
- Shahjahanpur–Delhi Passenger
- Meerut City–Lucknow Rajya Rani Express
- Uttarakhand Sampark Kranti Express
