= Saqi Amrohvi =

Urdu poet (1919–2005)

- Born: Syed Qaim Raza; 1914/1919; Amroha, United Provinces, British India
- Died: December 12, 2005 (aged 86-91); Karachi, Sindh, Pakistan
- Resting place: Behesht-e-Zehra Cemetery, North Karachi
- Occupation: Poet
- Writing career
- Pen name: Saqi
- Language: Urdu
- Notable works: Uftad, Magar Ab Sham Hoti Ja Rahi Hai

Saqi Amrohvi (born Syed Qaim Raza; 1914/1919 – 12 December 2005) was a Pakistani Urdu poet. Born in Amroha in British India, he migrated to Pakistan after the partition of India and settled in Karachi, where he spent most of his literary career.

== Early life and education ==
Saqi Amrohvi was born in 1914/1919 in Amroha, then part of the United Provinces of British India. His birth name was Syed Qaim Raza. His father was Syed Ali Qasim, and his grandfather, Syed Ali Aslam, was a landholder.

He received his early education at a local maktab in Amroha. During his youth, he became interested in wrestling and mushairas and subsequently took up poetry.

== Career ==
Following the partition of India in 1947, Amrohvi migrated to Pakistan and settled in Karachi.

In his early years there, he struggled to find a means of livelihood, and his limited formal education made it difficult for him to secure regular employment. He was employed for a time by the municipal corporation.

== Poetry ==
Amrohvi began writing poetry in his childhood. Before migrating to Pakistan, he sought poetic correction (islah) from Shakir Dehlavi. After settling in Pakistan, he received formal poetic instruction from Mir Jawad Ali, whom he regarded as his teacher.

His published works include the ghazal and nazm collections Uftad, Magar Ab Sham Hoti Ja Rahi Hai, and Sehra Mein Shajar.

== Death ==
Amrohvi died at the age 86 in Karachi on 12 December 2005. He was buried at Behesht-e-Zehra Cemetery in North Karachi.
