= Lucknow–Chandigarh Express =

Train in India

Lucknow-Chandigarh Superfast Express
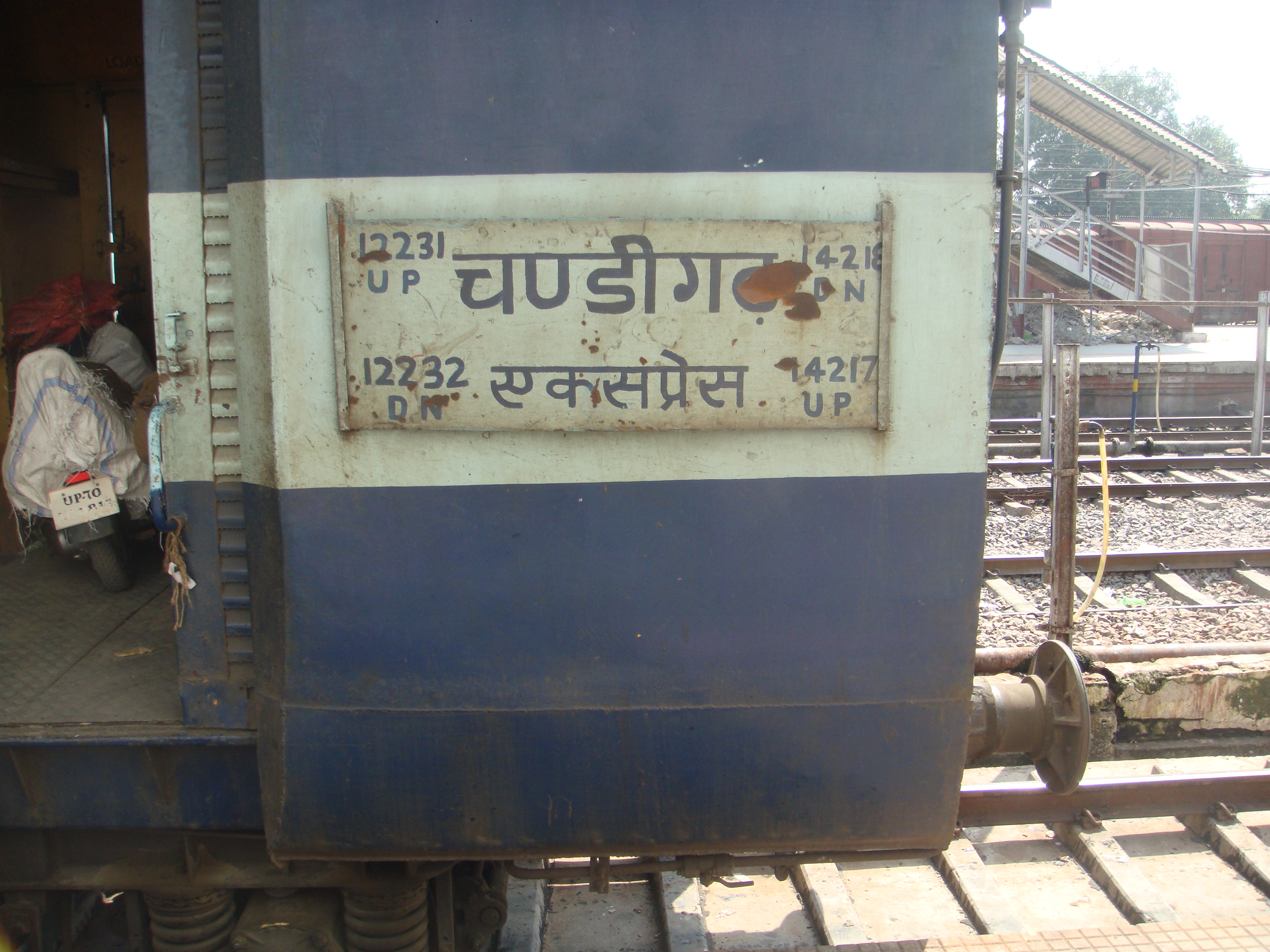
- Lucknow -Chandigarh Express train board.

Overview
- Service type: Superfast
- Locale: Uttar Pradesh, Uttarakhand, Haryana & Chandigarh
- Current operator(s): Northern Railway

Route
- Termini: Lucknow Charbagh (LKO); Chandigarh Junction (CDG)
- Stops: 15
- Distance travelled: 666 km (414 mi)
- Average journey time: 11 hours 30 minutes
- Service frequency: Daily
- Train number(s): 12231 / 12232

On-board services
- Class(es): AC 2 tier, AC 3 tier, Sleeper Class, General Unreserved
- Seating arrangements: Yes
- Sleeping arrangements: Yes
- Catering facilities: On-board catering, E-catering
- Observation facilities: Rake sharing with 14217/14218 Unchahar Express
- Baggage facilities: No
- Other facilities: Below the seats

Technical
- Rolling stock: LHB coach
- Track gauge: 1,676 mm (5 ft 6 in)
- Operating speed: 57 km/h (35 mph) average including halts

The 12231 / 12232 Lucknow–Chandigarh Superfast Express is a Superfast Express train belonging to Indian Railways – Northern Railways zone that runs between Lucknow Charbagh and Chandigarh Junction in India.

It operates as train number 12231 from Lucknow Charbagh to Chandigarh and as train number 12232 in the reverse direction.

== Coaches ==
The 12231/32 Lucknow Charbagh–Chandigarh Express presently has 2 AC 2 tier, 3 AC 3 tier, 6 Sleeper class, 6 Second Class seating & 2 SLR (seating cum luggage rake) coaches.

As with most train services in India, coach composition may be amended at the discretion of Indian Railways depending on demand.

== Service ==
The 12231/32 Lucknow Charbagh–Chandigarh Express covers the distance of 666.8 kilometres in 11 hours 30 mins as 12231 Lucknow–Chandigarh Express (58.00 km/h) and in 11 hrs 45 mins as 12232 Chandigarh–Lucknow Express (56.77 km/h).

As the average speed of the train is above 55 km/h, as per Indian Railways rules, its fare includes a Superfast surcharge.

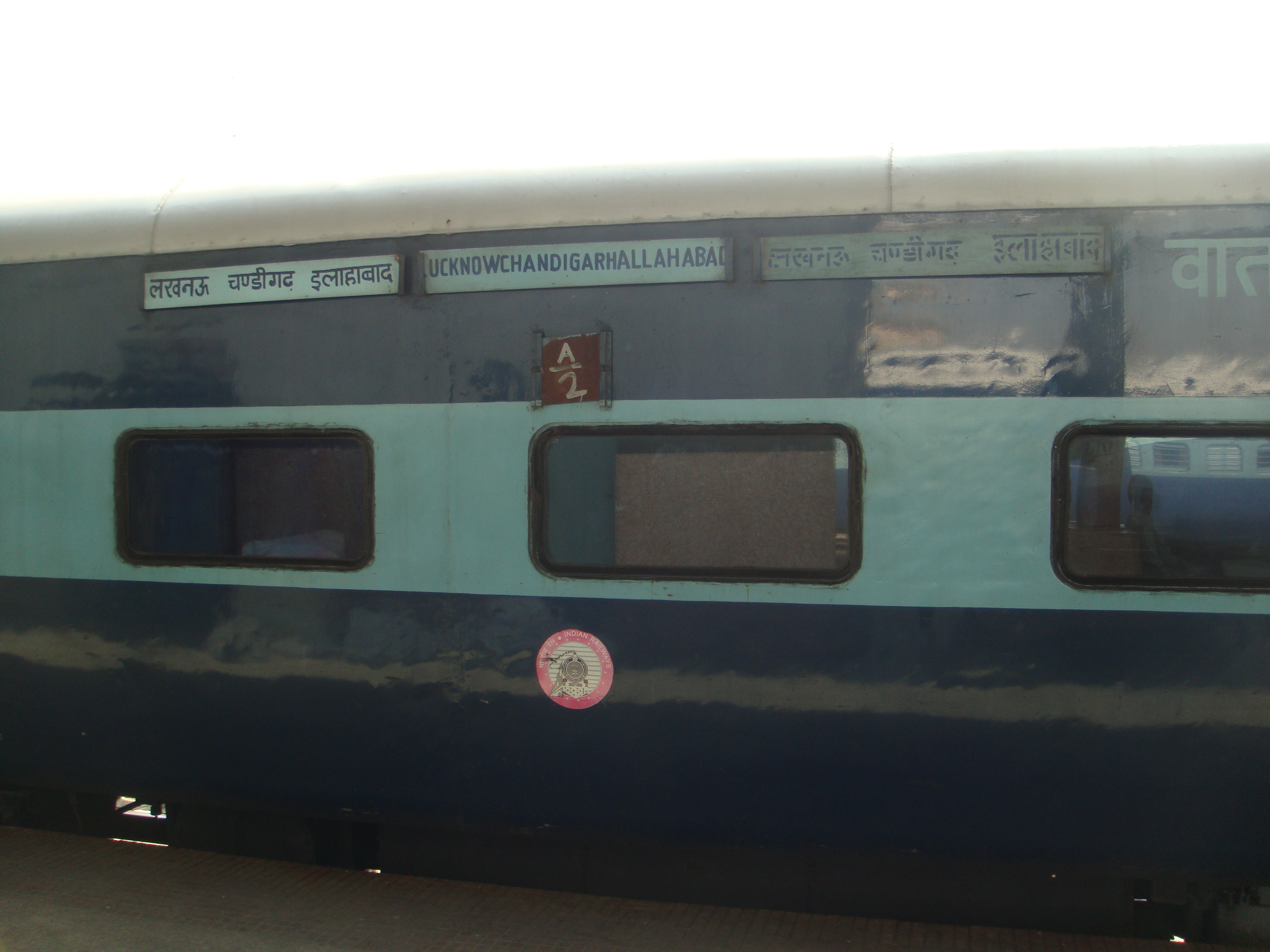
Lucknow–Chandigarh Express – AC 2 tier coach

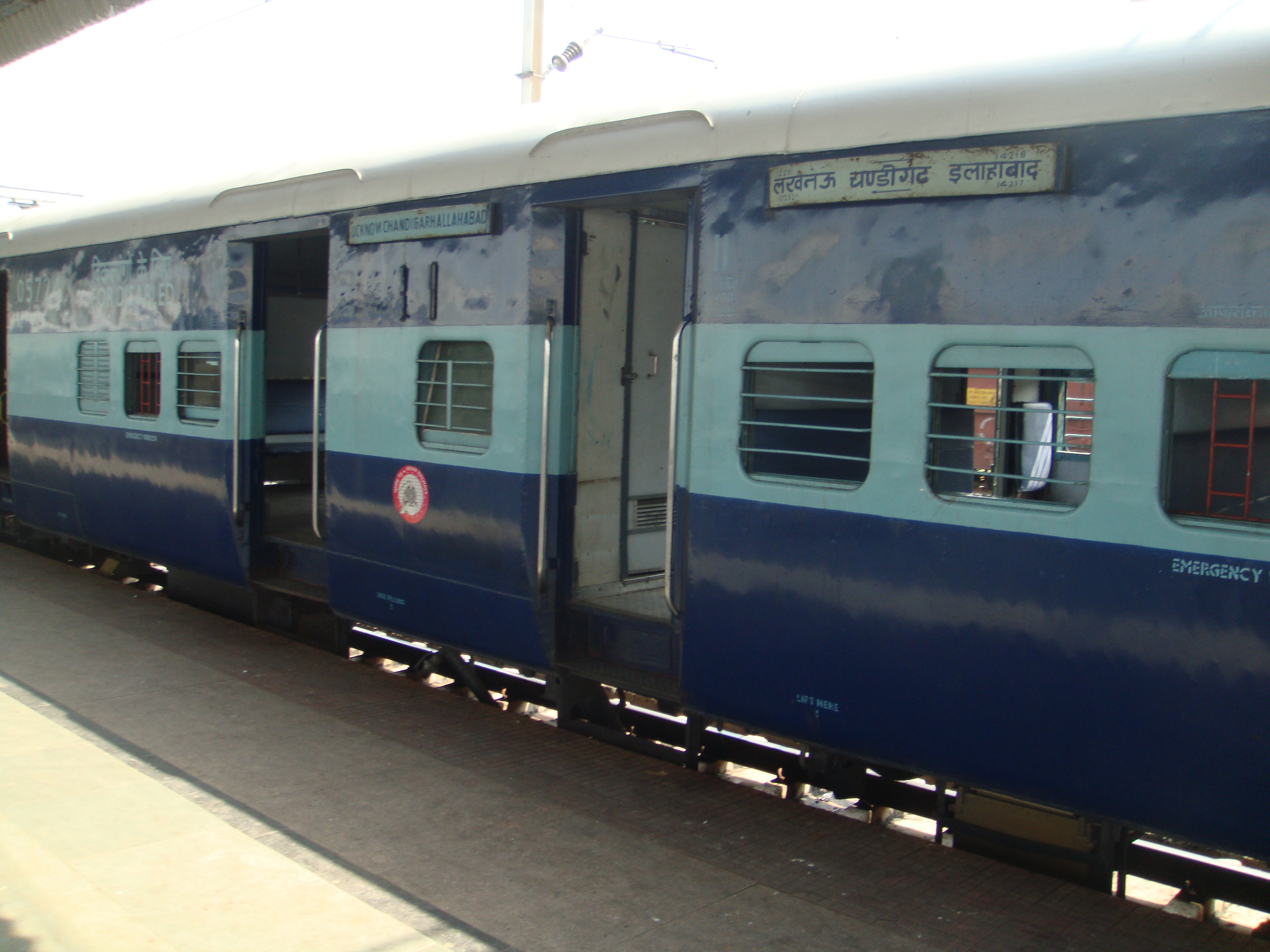
Lucknow–Chandigarh Express – SLR coach

== Routeing ==
The 12231/32 Lucknow Charbagh–Chandigarh Express runs via Bareilly Junction, Moradabad, Laksar Junction, Saharanpur Junction, Ambala Cantonment Junction to Chandigarh.

== Traction ==
As the entire route is fully electrified, a Ghaziabad Loco Shed-based WAP-5 / WAP-7 electric locomotive for its entire journey.

== Timetable ==
- 12231 Lucknow Charbagh–Chandigarh Express leaves Lucknow on a daily basis at 22:30 hrs IST and reaches Chandigarh at 10:00 hrs IST the next day.
- 12232 Chandigarh–Lucknow Charbagh Express leaves Chandigarh on a daily basis at 20:50 hrs IST and reaches Lucknow at 08:35 hrs IST the next day.

== See also ==
- Lucknow Junction
- Chandigarh Junction
- Lucknow Junction–Chandigarh Express
