= Mehboob Ali =

Mehboob Ali may refer to:

- Mehboob Ali (Uttar Pradesh politician), Indian politician from the state of Uttar Pradesh.
- Mehboob Ali (Rajasthani politician) (1931–2011), Indian politician in Rajasthan
- Mehboob Ali (athlete) (born 1990), Pakistani sprinter
- Mehboob Ali Kaiser, Indian politician who is a member of the 16th Lok Sabha from the Khagaria constituency (elected 2014)
