= Lucknow Junction–Chandigarh Express =

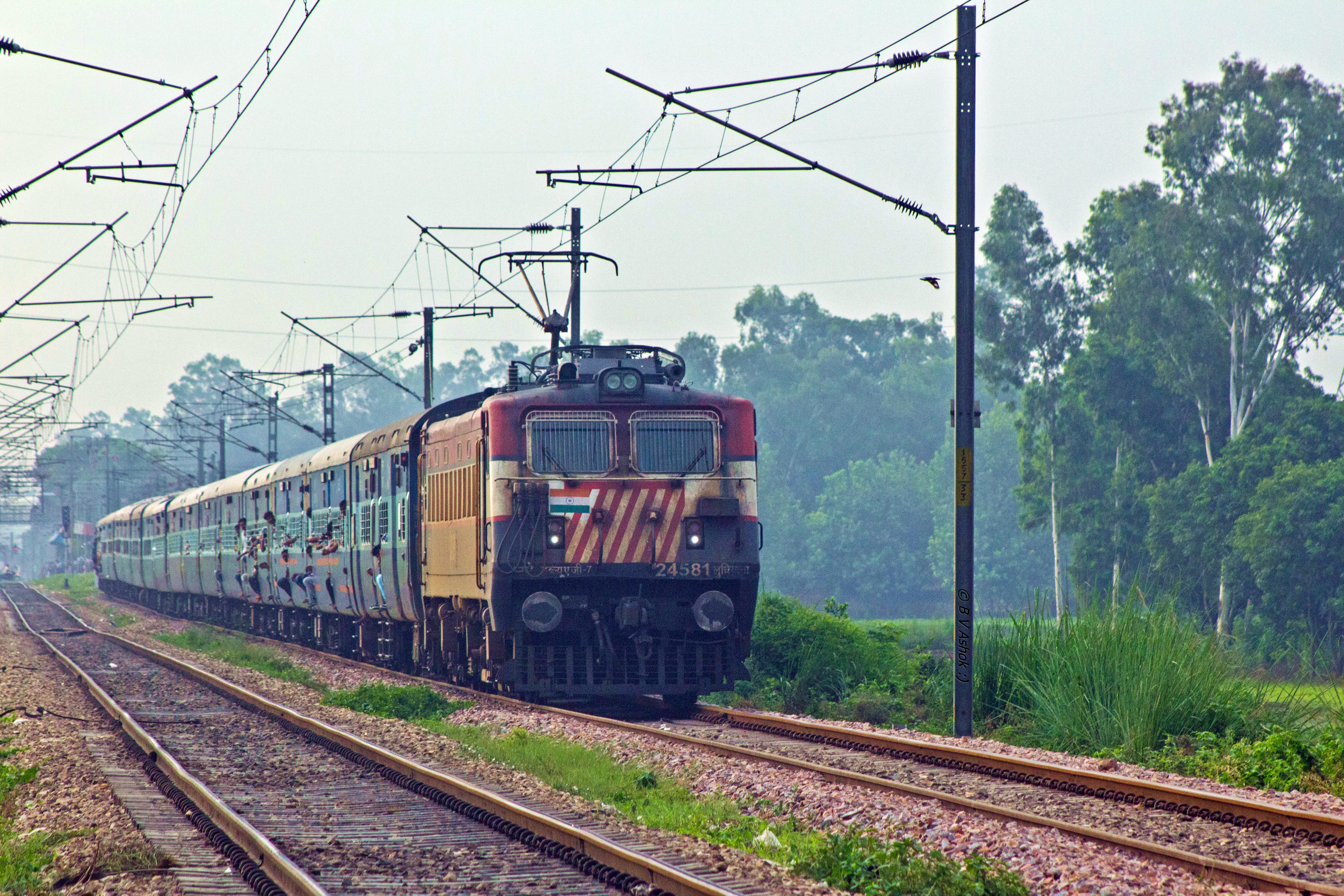
- Lucknow Junction–Chandigarh Express

Overview
- Service type: Express
- Current operator: North Eastern Railway zone

Route
- Termini: Lucknow Junction (LJN); Chandigarh Junction (CDG)
- Stops: 18
- Distance travelled: 702 km (436 mi)
- Average journey time: 15h 50m
- Service frequency: Daily (Note: Runs seven days in a week for every direction.)
- Train number: 15011/15012

On-board services
- Classes: AC 2 tier, AC 3 tier, Sleeper class, General Unreserved
- Seating arrangements: No
- Sleeping arrangements: Yes
- Catering facilities: On-board catering E-catering
- Observation facilities: LHB coach
- Entertainment facilities: No
- Baggage facilities: No
- Other facilities: Below the seats

Technical
- Rolling stock: 2
- Track gauge: 1,676 mm (5 ft 6 in)
- Operating speed: 44 km/h (27 mph), including halts

The Lucknow Junction–Chandigarh Express is an Express train belonging to North Eastern Railway zone that runs between Lucknow Junction and Chandigarh Junction in India. It is currently being operated with 15011/15012 train numbers on a daily basis.

== Service ==
The 15011/Lucknow Jn.–Chandigarh Express has an average speed of 44 km/h and covers 702 km in 15h 50m. The 15012/Chandigarh–Lucknow Jn. Express has an average speed of 44 km/h and covers 702 km in 15h 50m.

== Route and halts ==
The important halts of the train are:

- Lucknow Junction
- Moradabad Junction
- Amroha
- Bijnor
- Muzzampur Narayan
- Laksar Junction
- Roorkee
- Saharanpur Junction
- Yamunanagar-Jagadhri
- Yamunanagar-Jagadhri
- Ambala Cantonment
- Chandigarh Junction

== Coach composition ==
The train has standard LHB rakes with a maximum speed of 110 km/h. The train consists of 16 coaches:

- 2 AC II Tier
- 6 AC III Tier
- 3 Sleeper coaches
- 3 General Unreserved
- 1 Seating cum Luggage Rake
- 1 EOG

== Traction ==
Both trains are hauled by a Gonda Loco Shed-based WDM-3A diesel locomotive from Lucknow to Chandigarh and vice versa.

== Direction reversal ==
The train reverses its direction 1 times:

- Muazzampur Narayan Junction

== See also ==
- Lucknow Junction railway station
- Chandigarh Junction railway station
- Lucknow–Chandigarh Express
