= Dhanaura Assembly constituency =

Constituency of the Uttar Pradesh legislative assembly in India

Dhanaura
- Constituency No. 39 for the Uttar Pradesh Legislative Assembly

Constituency details
- Country: India
- Region: North India
- State: Uttar Pradesh
- District: Amroha
- Total electors: 3,21,055 (2017)
- Reservation: SC

Member of Legislative Assembly
- 18th Uttar Pradesh Legislative Assembly
- Incumbent Rajeev Tarara
- Party: Bharatiya Janata Party
- Elected year: 2017

Dhanaura is a constituency of the Uttar Pradesh Legislative Assembly covering the city of Dhanaura in the Amroha district of Uttar Pradesh, India.

Dhanaura is one of five assembly constituencies in the Amroha Lok Sabha constituency. Since 2008, this assembly constituency is numbered 39 amongst 403 constituencies.

Currently this seat belongs to Bharatiya Janata Party candidate Rajeev Tarara who won in last Assembly election of 2017 Uttar Pradesh Legislative Elections by defeating Samajwadi Party candidate Jagram Singh by a margin of 38,229 votes.

== Members of the Legislative Assembly ==
#	Term	Member of Legislative Assembly	Party	From	To	Days	Comment
1	16th Vidhan Sabha	Maikal Chandra	Samajwadi Party	March 2012	March 2017	1,829	
2	17th Vidhan Sabha	Rajeev Tarara	Bhartiya Janata Party	March 2017	March 2022	3470	
3	18th Vidhan Sabha	Rajeev Tarara	Bhartiya Janata Party	March 2022	Incumbent	1653	

== Election results ==
=== 2027 ===
2027 Uttar Pradesh Legislative Assembly election: Dhanaura
Party	Candidate	Votes	%	±%
INDIA				
NDA				
BSP				
NOTA	None of the above			
Majority				
Turnout				
gain from		Swing		

=== 2022 ===
2022 Assembly Elections: Dhanaura (SC)
Party	Candidate	Votes	%	±%
BJP	Rajeev Tarara	103,054	42.29	−3.43
SP	Vivek Singh	91,629	37.6	+8.86
BSP	Harpal Singh	43,974	18.04	−5.03
NOTA	None of the above	1,176	0.48	−0.34
Majority		11,425	4.69	−12.29
Turnout		243,697	70.34	+0.2
BJP hold		Swing		

=== 2017 ===
2017 Assembly Elections: Dhanaura (SC)
Party	Candidate	Votes	%	±%
BJP	Rajeev Tarara	102,943	45.72	
SP	Jagram Singh	64,714	28.74	
BSP	Sanjeev Lal	51,952	23.07	
RLD	Kapil Chandra	3,747	1.66	
NOTA	None of the above	1,824	0.82	
Majority		38,229	16.98	
Turnout		225,180	70.14	
BJP gain from SP		Swing	▲17.71	

=== 2012 ===
2012 Assembly Elections: Dhanaura (SC)
Party	Candidate	Votes	%	±%
SP	Maikal Chandra	55,545	28.38	Steady
BSP	Hem Singh	47,916	24.48	Steady
RLD	Jagram Singh	30,637	15.65	Steady
BJP	Harpal Singh	28,187	14.40	Steady
RMD	Geeta Rani	11,659	5.96	Steady
MD	Urvashi	8,530	4.36	Steady
	Remaining 9 Candidates	13,248	6.77	Steady
Majority		7,619	3.90	Steady
Turnout		1,95,722	66.53	Steady
SP win (new seat)				
