= Saiyed Zegham Murtaza =

Indian columnist

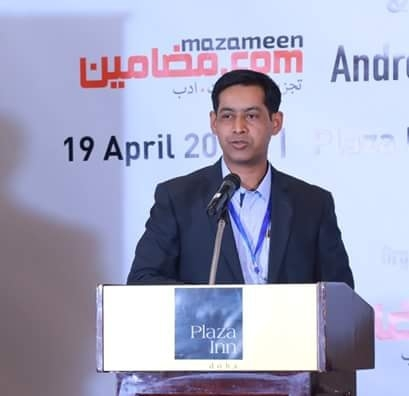
- At Doha Conference on Minority Education, 2018
- Born: Saiyed Zegham Murtaza; Amroha, India
- Other name: Zaigham
- Education: M.A (Mass Communication), M.A (Public Administration), LLB.
- Alma mater: Aligarh Muslim University, Faculty of Social Science
- Occupations: Journalist, blogger, author
- Years active: Since 2005

Saiyed Zegham Murtaza an Indian columnist and blogger. He is the author of Policenama- Jahan Murde bhi Gawahi dete hain, (published by the Rajpal and Sons) and Iran: Khomeini se Khamenei Tak (published by Sambhavna Prakashan). Also, he has translated the Hindi version of Gautam Bhatia's book "Offend, Shock, or Disturb: Free Speech under the Indian Constitution" for Oxford University Press. He has scripted and produced many documentaries.

== Early life ==
He was born in the city of Amroha in the district of Moradabad (now Amroha) in Uttar Pradesh. He passed his higher secondary from Meerut Public School Meerut, did his graduation from J.S. Hindu College, Amroha, Master's Degree in Journalism from Department of Journalism, AMU, Aligarh, and LLB. from KGK College, Moradabad. He belongs to the reputed family of Sayyids of Syed Nagli. His father, Saiyed Ali Zafar, was a trade unionist and a social activist. His grandfather, Maulvi Murtaza Hasan, was an ex-army man and a Freedom Fighter. One of his uncles Naseem uz Zafar Baquiri is a poet.

== Work ==
His journalistic stints include working with Rajya Sabha Television, Eenadu Television, Hindustan Times, and Asiaville News. His columns regularly appear in The Pioneer, Navjivan, National Herald, Asiaville News, Navbharat Times, Hindustan times and The Forward Press. Also, he wrote the script of several documentary films, including that of Brigadier Rajinder Singh: The Savior of Kashmir, The Guests of Destiny, Sangharsh, etc. He is also an independent voice, supporting the cause of education among Muslims of India. Recently, he formed a media company, APZ Media Venture Private Limited along with Aman and Parijat.

== See also ==
- List of Indian journalists
