= Hasanpur, Uttar Pradesh Assembly constituency =

Legislative Assembly constituency in Uttar Pradesh State, India

Coordinates: 28.72°N 78.28°E

Hasanpur Constituency
- Constituency No. 42 for the Uttar Pradesh Legislative Assembly

Constituency details
- Country: India
- Region: North India
- State: Uttar Pradesh
- District: Amroha
- Lok Sabha constituency: Amroha
- Total electors: 364,215
- Reservation: None

Member of Legislative Assembly
- 18th Uttar Pradesh Legislative Assembly
- Incumbent Mahender Singh Khadakvanshi
- Party: Bharatiya Janata Party
- Elected year: 2022

Hasanpur is one of the 403 Legislative Assembly constituencies of Uttar Pradesh state in India.

It is part of Amroha district.

== Members of Legislative Assembly ==
Year	Member	Party
1957	Sukhan Lal	Indian National Congress
1957	Jagdish Prasad	Indian National Congress
1962	Sukhan Lal	Indian National Congress
1962	Jagdish Prasad	Indian National Congress
1967	R. Uddin	Indian National Congress
1969	Mahendra Singh	Bharatiya Kranti Dal
1974	Mahendra Singh	Bharatiya Kranti Dal
1977	Rama Shanker Kaushik	Janata Party
1980	Rais Uddin Warsi	Janata Party
1985	Rama Shanker Kaushik	Indian Congress
1989	Rifaqat Husain	Indian National Congress
1991	Tula Ram Siani	Bharatiya Janata Party
1993	Tula Ram Siani	Bharatiya Janata Party
1996	Rifaqat Husain	Samajwadi Party
2002	Devendra Nagpal	Independent politician
2007	Farhat Hasan	Bahujan Samaj Party
2012	Kamal Akhtar	Samajwadi Party
2017	Mahender Singh Khadakvanshi	Bharatiya Janata Party

== Election results ==
=== 2027 ===
2027 Uttar Pradesh Legislative Assembly election: Hasanpur
Party	Candidate	Votes	%	±%
INDIA				
NDA				
BSP				
NOTA	None of the above			
Majority				
Turnout				
gain from		Swing		

=== 2022 ===
2022 Uttar Pradesh Legislative Assembly election: Hasanpur
Party	Candidate	Votes	%	±%
BJP	Mahendra Singh Khargvanshi	120,135	44.67	▲1.02
SP	Mukhya Gurjar	97,753	36.35	▲3.59
BSP	Phire Ram	36,150	13.44	▼6.93
AIMIM	Ahtesham Rza Hashmi	4,972	1.85	▲1.37
NOTA	None of the above	1,279	0.48	▼0.19
Majority		22,382	8.32	▼2.57
Turnout		268,924	73.84	▼0.54
BJP hold		Swing		

=== 2017 ===
Uttar Pradesh Legislative Assembly Election, 2017: Hasanpur
Party	Candidate	Votes	%	±%
BJP	Mahendra Singh Khargvanshi	111,269	43.65	
SP	Kamal Akhtar	83,499	32.76	
BSP	Gangasaran Khadgvanshi	51,930	20.37	
NOTA	None of the above	1,693	0.67	
Majority		27,770	10.89	
Turnout		254,919	74.38	
BJP gain from SP		Swing		

== See also ==
- List of constituencies of the Uttar Pradesh Legislative Assembly
- Amroha district
