= Ferhat Hasan =

Indian politician

Farhat Hasan

Uttar Pradesh Legislative Assembly
- In office 2007–2012
- Constituency: Hasanpur

Personal details
- Party: Bahujan Samaj Party

Farhat Hasan is an Indian politician and member of the Bahujan Samaj Party. He represented Hasanpur (Assembly constituency) in the 2007 Uttar Pradesh Legislative Assembly election.
