= Himmat Sinha =

Indian philosopher (1928–2023)

Himmat Singh Sinha
- Born: 1928; Hasanpur, Uttar Pradesh
- Died: 8 February 2023 (aged 94–95); Kurukshetra
- Citizenship: Indian
- Occupations: Professor, Philosopher and Author

Academic background
- Education: Punjab University and Meerut University

Academic work
- Discipline: Philosopher
- Sub-discipline: Philosophy
- Institutions: Kurukshetra University

Himmat Singh Sinha (Hindi: हिम्मत सिन्हा; 1928 – 8 February 2023) was an Indian philosopher, scholar, academician, and cultural theorist in the modern era. He was a professor of philosophy in Indian culture. He was widely known as "Nizam" of the Kurukshetra region. He was also a former associate of Loknayak Jayaprakash Narayan, and he had staunchly opposed the emergency of 1975. Similarly, he was an associate of the Former Prime Minister, Gulzari Lal Nanda, in the development of Kurukshetra.

== Early life and education ==
Himmat Sinha was born in 1928 at Hasanpur in the state of Uttar Pradesh in India. He was from Bulandshahr in Uttar Pradesh and later shifted to Kurukshetra region of Haryana. He completed his graduation education from Punjab University, Chandigarh and post graduation education in philosophy from Meerut University.

== Career ==
Himmat Sinha was appointed as a professor of philosophy in Indian culture at Kurukshetra University in Haryana during 1963. He served for 30 years as a professor and later became head of department in philosophy there. He was a member of the Indian Council for Philosophical Research for four consecutive years. He delivered 10 minutes Geeta Sandesh on All India Radio at Kurukshetra and Rohtak for several years. It is said that he was a scholar of Indian philosophy, an educator as well as a keen knower of the Ramcharitmanas of Tulsi Das. He has written forewords to poetry collections, story collections, essay collections and other books by about 40 different authors. Many students conducted research under the guidance of him.

Sinha died on February 8, 2023.

Himmat Sinha was an author of 200 articles in various newspapers and 22 books in Hindi, English and Urdu. He was a multilingual scholar. He authored "Communism and Gita" which is a philosophico-ethical study.
