= Amroha Assembly constituency =

Constituency of the Uttar Pradesh legislative assembly in India

41. Amroha; ४१. अमरोहा
- Constituency No. 41 for the Uttar Pradesh Legislative Assembly

Constituency details
- Country: India
- Region: North India
- State: Uttar Pradesh
- District: Amroha
- Lok Sabha constituency: Amroha
- Total electors: 3,13,755
- Reservation: None

Member of Legislative Assembly
- 18th Uttar Pradesh Legislative Assembly
- Incumbent Mehboob Ali
- Party: Samajwadi Party
- Elected year: 2022

Amroha Assembly constituency is a constituency of the Amroha district of Uttar Pradesh.

== Members of the Legislative Assembly ==
Year	Winner	Party
1957	Ram Kumar	Independent politician
1962	Sharafat Husain Rizvi	Communist Party of India
1967	Sharafat Husain Rizvi	Communist Party of India (Marxist)
1969	Saubhagyawati	Bharatiya Kranti Dal
1974	Mohammad Hayat	Indian National Congress
1977	Leelwat Singh	Janata Party
1980	Khursheed Ahmad	Indian National Congress (Indira)
1985	Mohammad Hayat	Lok Dal
1989	Mohammad Hayat	Janata Dal
1991	Pratap Singh	Bharatiya Janata Party
1993	Mohammad Hayat	Janata Dal
1996	Mangal Singh	Bharatiya Janata Party
2002	Mehboob Ali	Rashtriya Parivartan Dal
2007	Mehboob Ali	Samajwadi Party
2012	Mehboob Ali	Samajwadi Party
2017	Mehboob Ali	Samajwadi Party
2022	Mehboob Ali	Samajwadi Party

== Election results ==
=== 2027 ===
2027 Uttar Pradesh Legislative Assembly election: Amroha
Party	Candidate	Votes	%	±%
INDIA				
NDA				
BSP				
NOTA	None of the above			
Majority				
Turnout				
gain from		Swing		

=== 2022 ===
2022 Uttar Pradesh Legislative Assembly election: Amroha
Party	Candidate	Votes	%	±%
SP	Mehboob Ali	128,735	57.43	+20.33
BJP	Ram Singh	57,699	25.74	+3.19
BSP	Mohammed Naved Ayaz	34,585	15.43	−14.2
NOTA	None of the above	971	0.43	−0.18
Majority		71,036	31.69	+24.22
Turnout		224,150	71.44	+2.55
SP hold		Swing		

=== 2017 ===
2017 Uttar Pradesh Legislative Assembly election: Amroha
Party	Candidate	Votes	%	±%
SP	Mehboob Ali	74,713	37.1	
BSP	Naushad Ali	59,671	29.63	
BJP	Dr. Kunwar Saini	45,420	22.55	
RLD	Saleem Khan	14,132	7.02	
AIMIM	Shameem Ahmad	2,861	1.42	
NOTA	None of the above	1,219	0.61	
Majority		15,042	7.47	
Turnout		201,377	68.89	
SP hold		Swing		
