= Mustajab Shelle =

Indian artist

Mustajab Shelle (1948-2026)(Urdu: مستجاب شیلے ) was an artist who has painted thousands of book covers for Hindi novels. Shelle was an Amroha, India, based painter, whose original name was Mustajab Ahmad Siddiqui. He has learnt the art of painting from Eqbal Mehdi.

After a long career of painting cover pages for Hindi pulp fiction, Shelle turned to realist and abstract painting using water and oil medium. In an attempt to bring back the tradition of using hand-painted film posters, director Alok Sharma has used Mustajab Shelle's hand-painted poster for his Sanjay Mishra, Anshuman Jha and Jaaved Jaaferi starrer short film Bullet Proof Anand.

Shelle has participated in numerous exhibitions.
