= Khayal Amrohvi =

Pakistani poet, writer and educationist

- Born: Syed Ali Mehdi Naqvi; 10 December 1930; Deccan, Hyderabad State, India
- Died: 14 May 2009 (aged 78); Layyah, Pakistan
- Other name: Khayal Amrohi
- Occupations: Poet, Writer and Educationist

Khyal Amrohvi (born Syed Ali Mehdi Naqvi and also known as Khayal Amrohi) was a renowned Pakistani poet, writer and educationist. He was born in Deccan, Hyderabad State, India on 10 December 1930. After the creation of Pakistan, he moved to Karachi and then to Lahore.

He got his Ph.D. in Persian language from the Tehran University, Iran.

Dr. Khayal Amrohvi wrote 25 books on topics related to literature and philosophy. He was also a poet and his lists of publications include four collections of poetry. Maqtal-e-Jan was his maiden volume of poetry published in 1967. Gunbad-e-Bedar, Lumhoon ki Aanch and Kawaneen-e-Sehar are the titles of his other collections of verse. His prose books include Socialism aur Asri Taqazay, Shaola-e-Tehrir and Naiy Ufaq, Nai Kirnain. All these books are a notable part of progressive Urdu literature.

He served in government and private sectors and later joined the education department in 1964 and settled permanently in Layyah, Punjab, Pakistan.

Dr Khayal Amrohi died after protracted illness in Layyah on 14 May 2009 at age 79.
