= Naseem uz Zafar Baquiri =

Indian poet

Sayyid Naseem Uz Zafar Baquri
- Born: Sayyid Naseem uz Zafar; 12 August 1952 (age 73); Syed Nagli, India
- Other name: Naseem
- Education: B.Sc, BUMMS, M.D
- Occupations: Medical Practitioner, Poet
- Years active: Since 1971

Naseem uz Zafar is an Indian poet and the author of Ek Nukta Muskra Diya, a collection of Nauha, Musaddas and Salam and Nazeer e Karbala, the compilation of musaddas and salaam of Allama Maujiz Sambhali

== Early life ==
He passed his higher secondary from Sukhdevi Inter College Hasanpur, Intermediate from Aggrawal Inter College (Now Maharaja Agrasen Inter College), Moradabad, B.Sc From Kedar Nath Girdharilal Khatri PG College Moradabad, BUMMS from A.K Tibbia College, AMU Aligarh and M.D from Rajasthan University, Jaipur.

== Work ==
His literary works include "Musawwir Sabzwari- Fun aur Shairi, Translation of Dr. Gurudas Das Gupta's drama from Bengali to Urdu as 'Naya Chand', Drama- "Mai Abhi Wahan Se Aa Raha HuN', Lyrics for Doordarshan's "Jung Abhi Jari Hai" and the compilation of "Nazir e Karbala" of late Maujiz Sambhali.
