= Dhanaura =

Dhanaura Mandi Dhanaura
- city
- Location in Uttar Pradesh, India
- Coordinates: 28.97°N 78.25°E
- Country: India
- State: Uttar Pradesh
- District: Amroha
- Named for: Being Mandi for aalu gur Mungfali

Government
  - Type: Nagar Palika Parishad
  - Body: Nagar Palika Parishad
  - Nagar Palika Adhyaksh: Mr Praveen Kumar
  - MLA: Mr Rajiv Tarara
- Elevation: 212 m (696 ft)

Population (2011)
  - Total: 60,007

Languages
  - Official: Hindi
- Time zone: UTC+5:30 (IST)
- Postal code: 244231
- Vehicle registration: UP23

Dhanaura (or Mandi Dhanaura) is a city and a municipal board (nagar palika parishad) in Amroha district in the state of Uttar Pradesh, India. Dhanaura is also known by its former name Mandi Dhanaura.

== Geography ==
Dhanaura (धनौरा) is located at 28.97°N 78.25°E, 17 km from Gajraula. It has an average elevation of 212 metres (695 feet).
