= Kamal Akhtar =

Indian politician

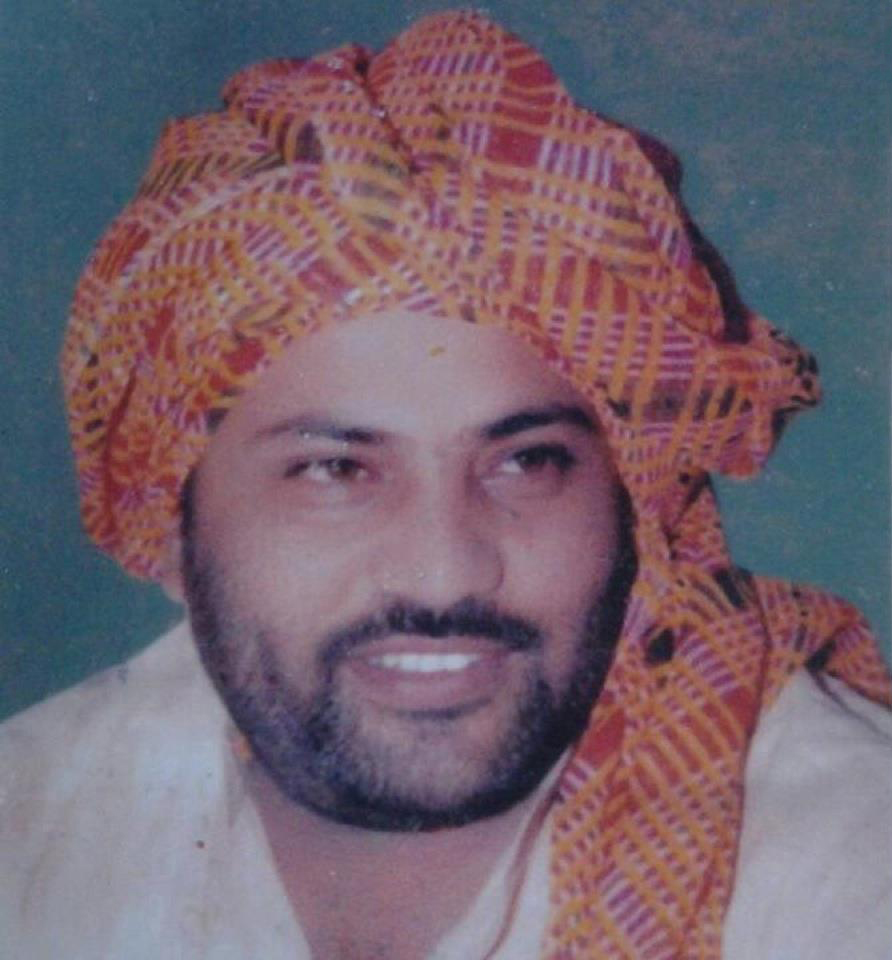

Member of the Uttar Pradesh legislative assembly
- Incumbent
- Assumed office 10 March 2022
- Constituency: Kanth
- In office 2012–2017
- Constituency: Hasanpur

Cabinet Minister, Food and civil Supply of Uttar Pradesh
- In office 2015–2017

Panchayati Raj Minister of Uttar Pradesh
- In office 2012–2015

Member of Parliament, Rajya Sabha
- In office 2004–2010
- Constituency: Uttar Pradesh

Personal details
- Born: 24 October 1971 (age 54) Ujhari, Uttar Pradesh, India
- Party: Samajwadi Party
- Spouse: Humera Bano
- Education: Jamia Millia Islamia
- Profession: Advocate, Politician

Kamal Akhtar (born 24 October 1971) is a member of the 18th Legislative Assembly and has earlier been the former Panchayati Raj Minister of Uttar Pradesh, former Member of the Legislative Assembly, and a politician from Samajwadi Party as well as a former Member of the Parliament of India representing Uttar Pradesh in the Rajya Sabha, the upper house of the Indian Parliament.

He lost his seat in the 2017 Uttar Pradesh Assembly election to Mahender Singh Kadakhvashi of the Bharatiya Janata Party.

He won his seat in the 2022 Uttar Pradesh Assembly election from Kanth (Moradabad) legislative assembly constituency.

== Early life ==
He was born in Ujhari, Amroha, Uttar Pradesh, India.

== Personal life ==
Kamal Akhtar was born to Nafeesuddin Ahmad and Mahajabin in Ujhari. He completed his B.A. (Hons.) in Economics and LL.B. at the Jamia Milia Islamia, New Delhi. His wife Humera Akhtar was Samajwadi Party's Lok Sabha candidate from Amroha in the sixteenth Lok Sabha election.

== Achievements ==
- 2022: Member of 18th Uttar Pradesh Assembly from Kanth, Moradabad
