= Ujhari =

- Town
- Nickname: Dhakka Ujhari
- Location in Uttar Pradesh, India Ujhari (India)
- Coordinates: 28°39′35″N 78°21′26″E
- Country: India
- State: Uttar Pradesh
- District: Amroha

Population (2011)
  - Total: 24,488

Languages
  - Urdu: Hindi
- Time zone: UTC+5:30 (IST)
- Postal code: 244242
- Vehicle registration: UP-23
- Website: up.gov.in

Ujhari is a town and a nagar panchayat in Amroha district in the Indian state of Uttar Pradesh.

As of 2011 India census, Ujhari has a population of 24,488. Males constitute 51% of the population and females 49%. Ujhari has an average literacy rate of 58.20%, lower than the state average of 67.68%: male literacy is 66.28%, and female literacy is 49.62%. In Ujhari, 18.69% of the population is under 6 years of age.

== Notable residents ==
- Kamal Akhtar
