= Amroha =

City in Uttar Pradesh, India

- City
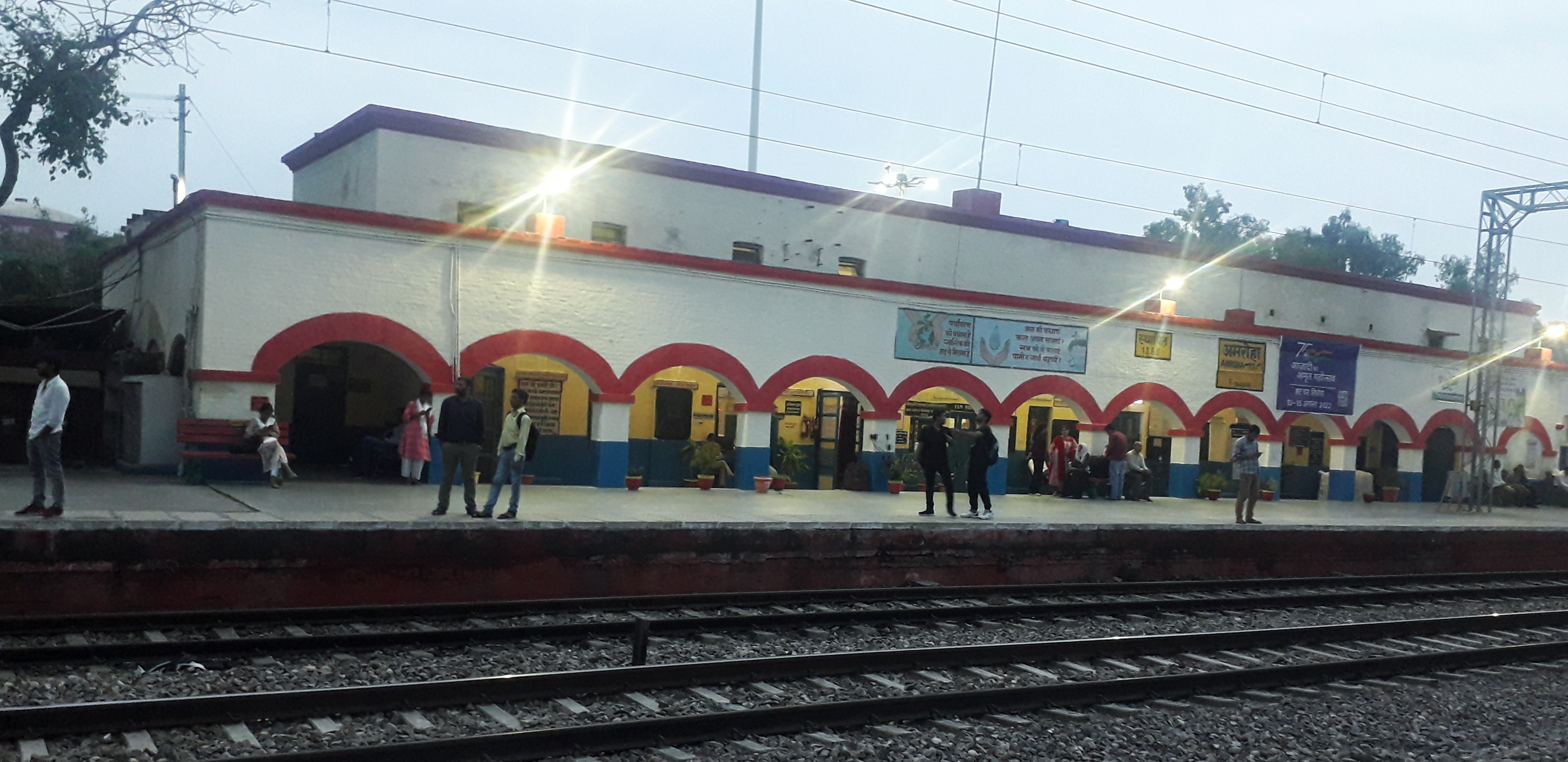
- Amroha railway station

- Location in Uttar Pradesh, India Amroha (India)
- Coordinates: 28°54′15.95″N 78°28′3.10″E
- Country: India
- State: Uttar Pradesh
- District: Amroha

Government
  - Body: Municipality
  - Chairperson: Shashi Jain
  - MLA: Mehboob Ali
- Elevation: 210 m (690 ft)

Population (2011)
  - Total: 198,471

Language
  - Official: Hindi
  - Additional official: Urdu
  - Native: Khariboli
- Time zone: UTC+5:35 (IST)
- PIN: 244221
- Telephone code: 05922
- Vehicle registration: UP-23
- Website: nppamroha.com

Amroha is a city in the state of Uttar Pradesh in India. It is located north-west of Moradabad. It is the administrative headquarters of Amroha district.

== Geography ==
Amroha is located north-west of Moradabad, near the Sot (सोत) River. Being just 130 km away, Amroha's weather is very similar to Delhi's. The city is divided into localities and blocks. The climate of Amroha is similar to other districts of Western Uttar Pradesh, situated at the base of the Himalayas, which becomes hot in summer and dry and cold in winter.

== Administration ==
The municipal body of Amroha is Nagar Palika Parishad. Under British rule, the first municipality was founded at Amroha on 21 September 1884. In 1924, Venkatesh Prasad was chosen to serve as the city's first chairman. He was succeeded for a three-year term by Khan Bahadur Syed Nabi Hadi. The municipality was then taken over by Hakim Hasan Musanna, Sakhavul Hasnain Naqvi, Chaudhary Nanak Chand, Mohammad Yasin Qureshi, Mohammad Mian Rizvi, Hafiz Abdul Qayyum, Radheshyam Maheshwari, Haji Kallan Khan, and Babu Maqbool. The city's residents got the power to elect their chairman in 1995.

The Amroha Nagar Palika Parishad is administered by the Uttar Pradesh Municipalities Act, 1916. It covers an area of 8.950 sq. km. There are 40 wards under the Amroha Nagar Palika Parishad: Pandaki, Rampur Ghana, Akbar Pur Patti, Rdugpur, Chhebda, Ahmadnagar, Pachokra, Kuraishi Purwi, Danishamdan, Gulriya, Panjusray, Raypur Kalan, Khalsa, Saray Kohna, Chhanga Darwaja, Mohammadi Saray, Pir Garh, Katra Gulam Ali, Kishangarh, Batwal, Avas Vikas, Gashtiyan, Bazar Rajjak, Kot, Katkui, Mullana, Mandi Chaub, Kali Pakdi, Chauk, Basavan Ganj, Kalakuan, Lakra, Darwar Kala, Nal, Kureshi Pashchim, Begam Saray Khurda, Lalmasjid, Shafat Pota, Majapota, and Naubat Khana.

The Executive Officer of the Amroha Nagar Palika Parishad is Dinesh Yadav.

The departments under the Amroha Nagar Palika Parishad are Public Works Department, Public Health Department, Tax department, Primary Activity Department, Street lights, Town planning, Urban Development, Water drainage, Hydraulic.

National programmes such as Adarsh Smart City, AMRUT have been implemented in Amroha.

== Demographics ==
Religions in Amroha (2011)
Religion	Percent
Islam	73.80%
Hinduism	25.48%
Other or not stated	0.71%

Amroha is a city in Uttar Pradesh. As per the 2011 census, Amroha had a population of 198,471. Population of children within the age group of 0–6 is 28323 which is 14.27% of the total population of Amroha (NPP). In Amroha Nagar Palika Parishad, the female sex ratio is of 925 against the state average of 912. Moreover, the child sex ratio in Amroha is around 950 compared to the Uttar Pradesh state average of 902. The total number of literates in Amroha was 198,471, which constituted 53.5% of the population with male literacy of 57.2% and female literacy of 49.3%. The effective literacy rate of 7+ population of Amroha was 62.4%, of which male literacy rate was 66.7% and female literacy rate was 57.6%. The Scheduled Castes and Scheduled Tribes population was 12,039 and 14 respectively. Amroha had 33903 households in 2011.

Languages in Amroha (2011)
1. Urdu (64.5%)
2. Hindi (35.2%)
3. Others (0.26%)

At the time of the 2011 census, 64.49% of the population spoke Urdu and 35.25% Hindi as their first language.

== Economy ==
Amroha is known for its production of mangoes. Some of the industries in Amroha include cotton & textiles, and small-scale production of cotton cloth, hand-loom weaving, pottery making, sugar milling and secondary ones are carpet manufacturing, wood handicrafts and dholak manufacturing.

== Connectivity ==
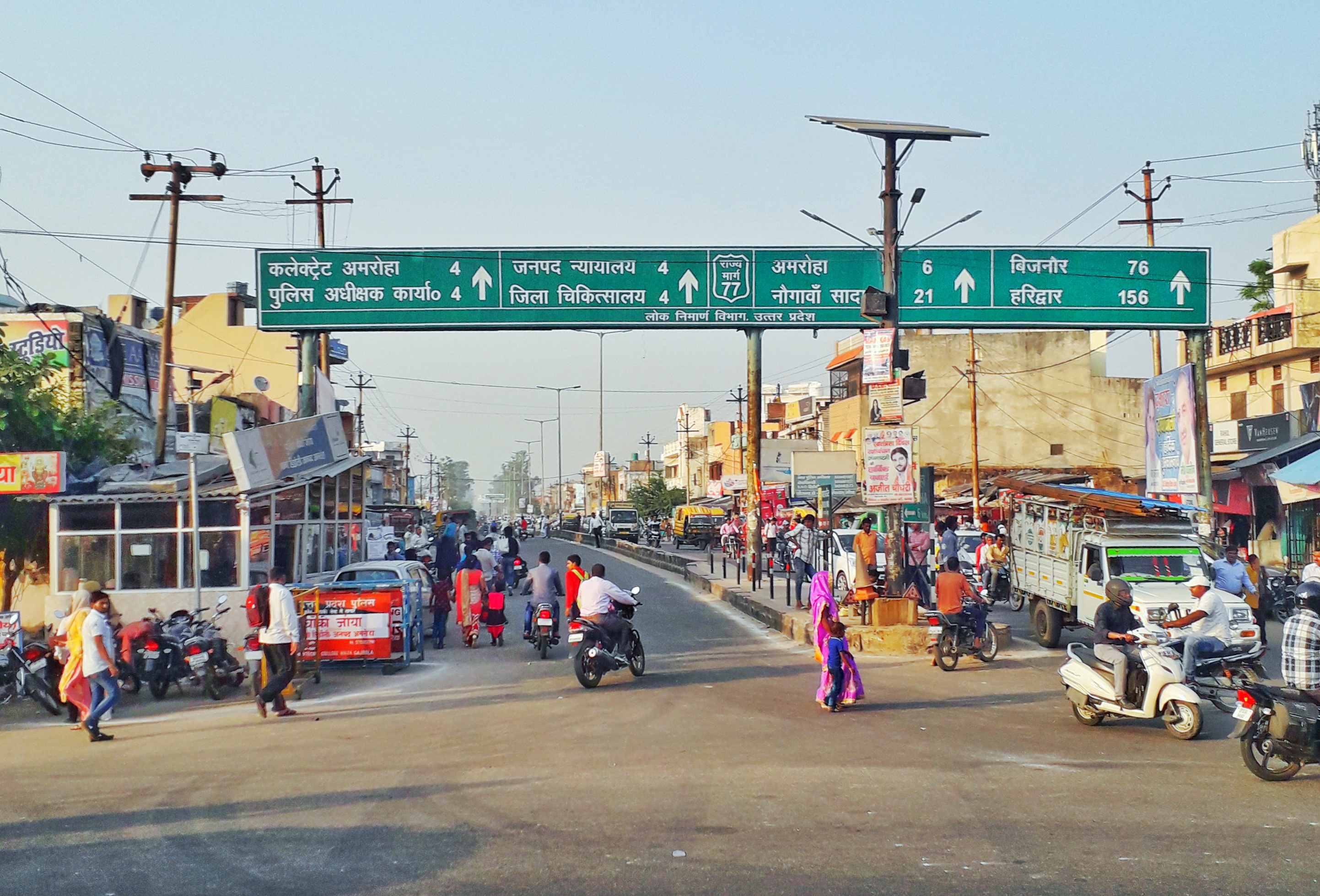
UP SH-77 Joya

Amroha is well connected through Railways and roads with the Indian capital New Delhi. Amroha railway station is situated on the Delhi-Moradabad line, and all passenger trains & most of the express trains stop here. Amroha railway station is on a line built by Oudh and Rohilkhand Railway, 868 miles from Kolkata. Amroha is about 5 km away from NH 24, a four-lane highway that connects New Delhi to Lucknow.

== Landmark places ==
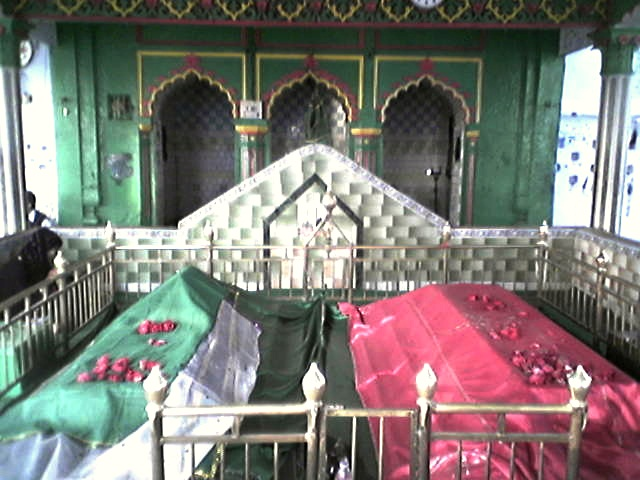
Syed Husain Sharaf-ud-din Shahvilayat

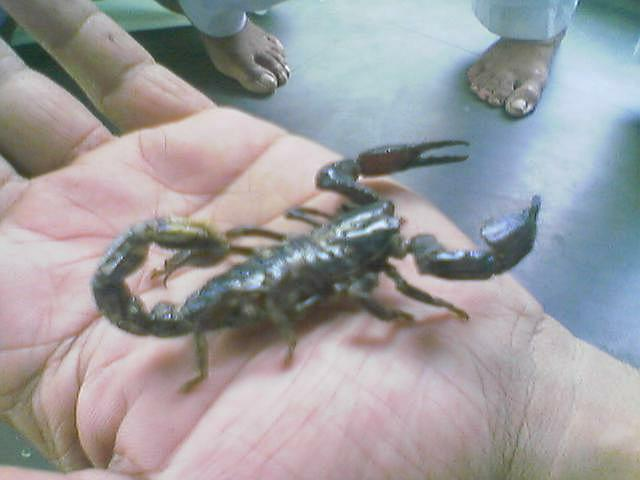
Scorpion on Palm at Amroha.

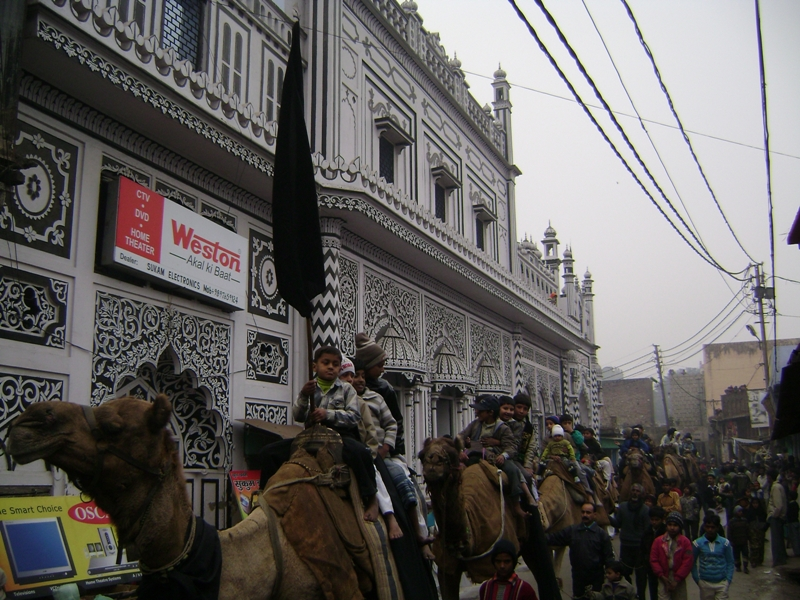
Azakhana wazeer un nisa

Amrohas has many tourist attractions. Vasudev Temple for Hindus. Dargah Shah Wilayat of Sufi saint Syed Husain Sharaf-ud-din Soharwardi Naqvi is visited by people across the country. The Sufi Shah wilyat came to Amroha from Wasit, Iraq in 13th century. It is claimed that at his resting place, scorpions never sting.

== Notable people ==
- Ahmad Hasan Amrohi, Indian Islamic scholar and freedom fighter
- Azeem Amrohvi, Indian Urdu poet
- Bilal Amrohi, Indian actor, grandson of Kamal Amrohi
- Ahmad Saeed Kazmi Islamic scholar from Multan, Pakistan who migrated from Amroha in 1935
- Bhagwan Sahay, ICS, CBE, Padma Bhushan, former Lt. Governor of Punjab, Governor of Jammu & Kashmir, and Kerala
- Eqbal Mehdi, Pakistani artist
- Izaz Ali Amrohi, Indian Hanafi scholar of Islam
- Jaun Elia, Urdu poet
- Javed Khan Amrohi, Indian actor
- K. A. Nizami, Indian historian and diplomat
- Kamal Amrohi, Indian film director and writer
- Khayal Amrohvi, Pakistani writer and educationist
- Mahboob Ali, Indian politician
- Mashhoor Amrohi, Indian actor, grandson of Kamal Amrohi
- Mohammed Shami, Indian national cricketer
- Mustajab Shelle, Indian painter and writer
- Nasim Amrohvi, Pakistani Urdu lexicographer and writer
- Waqar-ul-Mulk, Indian Muslim politician
- Nisar Ahmed Faruqi, Indian Sufi scholar of Islam
- Rais Amrohvi, Pakistani writer, elder brother of Jaun Elia
- Saiyed Zegham Murtaza, Indian columnist and blogger
- Sadequain, Pakistani artist and calligraphist
- Syed Mahmood Naqvi, Indian earth scientist
- Syed Wajih Ahmad Naqvi, Indian marine scientist
- Saqi Amrohvi, Urdu poet and writer
- Vishnu Sahay, ICS, former Cabinet Secretary, Governor of Assam and Nagaland

== See also ==
- Amrohi Syed
- Amroha
