= Azeem Amrohvi =

Urdu poet (1945–2020)

Azeem Amrohvi عظِیم امروہوی
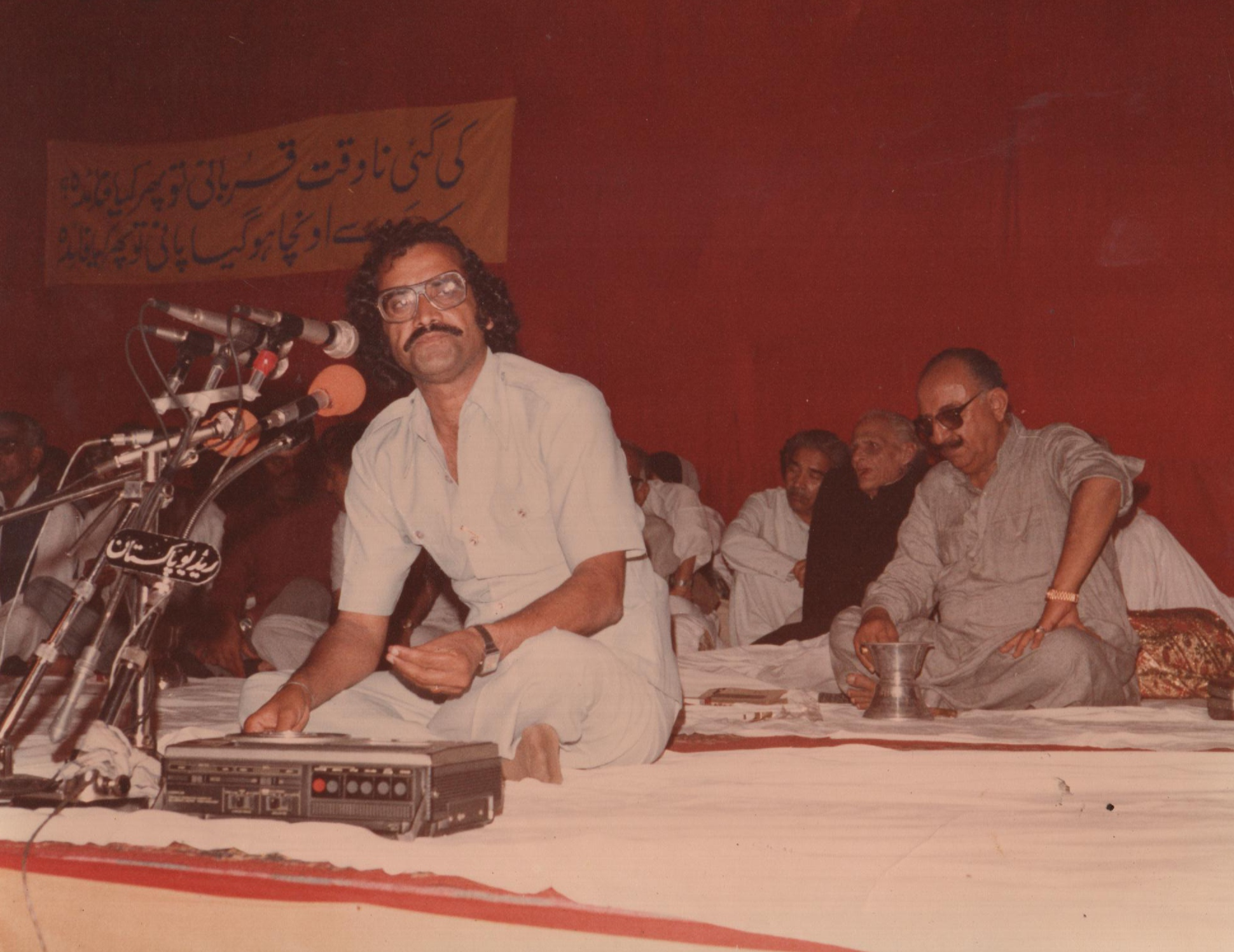

Personal details
- Born: 29 April 1945 Amroha, United Provinces, British India (present-day Uttar Pradesh, India)
- Died: 10 October 2020 (aged 75) Delhi, India
- Spouse: Shameem Fatima

Azeem Amrohi (Urdu: عظِیم امروہوی), was an Urdu poet and a scholar. Amrohi started writing poetry early in his life and has written almost every form of Urdu poetry, including Hamd, na`at, nazm, ghazal, qasida, salaam and manqabat). He is most famous for his book Marsiya Nigaraan e Amroha. He wrote almost 30 Marsiyas. He was awarded Meer Taqi Meer award in 1993.

== Early life and education ==
Azeem Amrohvi was born on 29 April 1945, in Amroha, Uttar Pradesh to a very religious family. He was the first child of Noor Ul Hasan and Raziya Bano. He lost his mother as an infant and was raised by his grandmother. He completed his B.Com. from Lucknow University and started working in Food Corporation of India while continuing his education. Then he completed many degree courses in Urdu like Adeeb, Kamil, Dabeer, Fazil and completed his M.A in Urdu. He started his PhD when he had already published eight books.

== Career ==
He wrote his first marsiya at 24. His works describing his travels in Iran received the book of the year award by the Urdu Academy of Delhi. The Iranian Government published six of his books. He is the only Urdu writer who wrote a book on Ruhollah Khomeini in poetry form.

== Death ==
Azeem Amrohvi died from heart attack on 10 October 2020. He had heart disease for the last 15 years prior to his death.

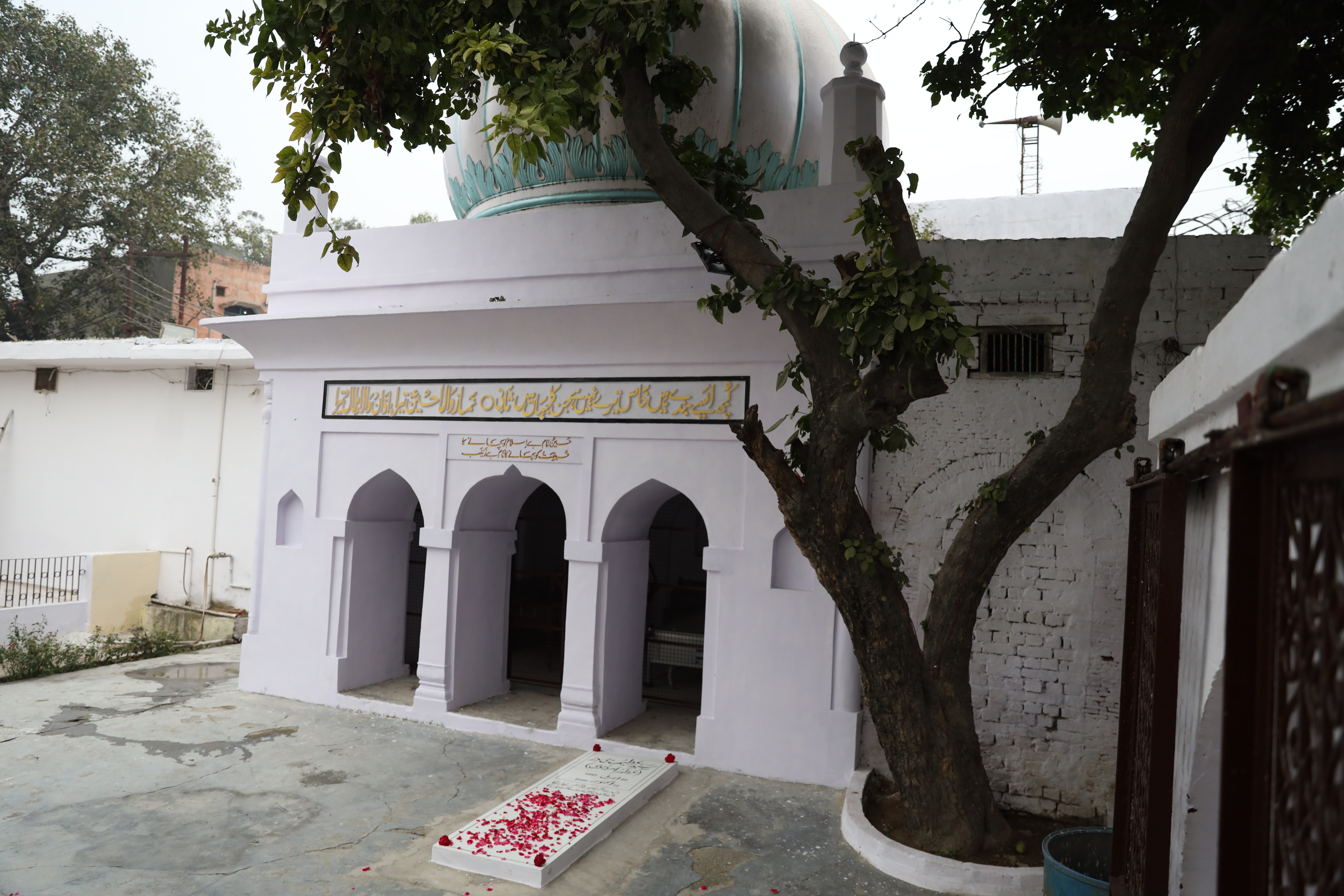
Grave of Dr. Azeem Amrohvi

== Bibliography ==
- Hadees e gham
- Hussain aur zindagi
- Tehreek e nenawa
- Sherh e gham
- marsiya e azeem
- Hussainyat ek aafaaqi tehreek
- Marsiya Nigaraan e Amroha
- Bain ul aqwaami muharram number
- Qur'an aur Hussain
- Rasool e Azam
- Ittehaad e Islami
- Mulaqqat e Imam
- Mufassir e noor
- Mere khwabo ka jahan
- Khandan e Shameem ki marsiya goyi
- Naqsh e heyat
- Aaftab e Inqalab
- Tawaaf e noor
- Shameem E shukhan
- Rasooliyaat
- Shamime e Aqidat
- Shamime Atash
- Hilal e Gham (Hindi)
- Hilal e Gham 2 (Hindi)
- Marasiye Azeem
- Miraaj e Sukhan
- ishq e Azeem
