= Mehboob Ali (Uttar Pradesh politician) =

Indian politician

Member of the Uttar Pradesh Legislative Assembly
- Incumbent
- Assumed office February 2002
- Preceded by: Mangal Singh
- Constituency: Amroha

Personal details
- Citizenship: Indian
- Party: Samajwadi Party
- Spouse: Sakina Begum
- Relations: Bashir Ahmed (father)
- Children: Parvez Ali; Shahnawaz Ali
- Occupation: Agriculturist
- Committees: Chairman Public Accounts Committee Uttar Pradesh
- Portfolio: Ex-Cabinet Minister Senior Secondary Education Government of Uttar Pradesh

Mehboob Ali is an Indian politician from the state of Uttar Pradesh. He is representing the Amroha seat on a Samajwadi Party ticket since 2002. He has also held different ministerial berths.

== Political career ==
Mehboob Ali won his first MLA election from Khanth seat becoming lone MLA elected in 2002 on a Rashtriya Parivartan Dal ticket. Ali was given the portfolio of "Minister of State for Waqf" by Chief Minister Mayawati. In Uttar Pradesh Assembly election of 2007, Ali contested on a Samajwadi Party ticket. He retained his seat as he defeated his nearest rival candidate Mangal Singh of Bharatiya Janata Party by 714 votes. He continued to retain the seat in the consequent Uttar Pradesh Assembly election of 2012 and Uttar Pradesh Assembly election of 2017.

In the Akhilesh Yadav ministry, Ali was made the Minister of Sericulture and Textile in November 2015 during a cabinet reshuffle by Chief Minister Akhilesh Yadav. In October 2016, he was given the additional charge of Minor Irrigation.

== Personal life ==
Mehboob Ali was born in Shakarpur village near post Rajabpur district Amroha. Though Ali's wife Sakina Begum was given a ticket by his party to contest the presidency of Zilla Parishad, it was later withdrawn. His son, Pervez Ali is a member of Legislative Council. He has 2 elder and 2 younger brothers. 2 elder brothers are no more named as Mohd Gani, Mehfooz Ali. Younger brothers' names are Mehmood Ali urf Bhure bhai and Shamsuddin Ali.

== Controversies ==
As of December 2012, Ali had 15 criminal cases pending against him. They included robbery, kidnapping and attempt to murder.

In March 2012, an FIR was lodged against Ali by Peace Party candidate Naushad Ali. Naushad Ali alleged that Mehboob Ali and his supporters had allegedly assaulted him and a polling agent. He is also accused of murdering political rival Shaukat Pasha, who had contested against him in the 2012 elections. This caused sectarian conflict between the Muslim communities of Turk (to which Pasha belonged) and Malik (Ali's community). Gram Panchayats led by Turks passed a resolution asking people not to vote for Ali. Former Member of Parliament and a member of the Turk community Shafiqur Rahman Barq demanded his resignation.
