= Eqbal Mehdi =

Eqbal Mehdi (1 April 1946, Amroha, British India – 19 May 2008, Karachi, Pakistan) was a Pakistani painter famous for his pen drawings.

== Early life ==
Eqbal Mehdi was born to Syed Mir Ali, in Amroha, then British India (now India). Mehdi and his brother moved to Pakistan during the late 1950s.

== Art career ==
Eqbal Mehdi was a self-taught artist. He taught many people the art of painting in India and Pakistan. Mustajab Shelle of Amroha, India and Siraj Uddun Dehlvi of Pakistan and Muhammad Ali Shaikh from Larkana, Pakistan are his students. He was an artist for Lail o Nahar, and also did illustrations for another magazine, Sab Rang.

== Art exhibits ==
- Arts Council of Pakistan Karachi solo exhibit back in 1969

== Death ==
Eqbal Mehdi died in Karachi on 19 May 2008 from liver and heart disease. He was married and had two children.

== Awards ==
- Pride of Performance Award by the President of Pakistan
