= Amroha district =

District in Uttar Pradesh, India

Coordinates: 28°54′00″N 78°28′12″E

- District
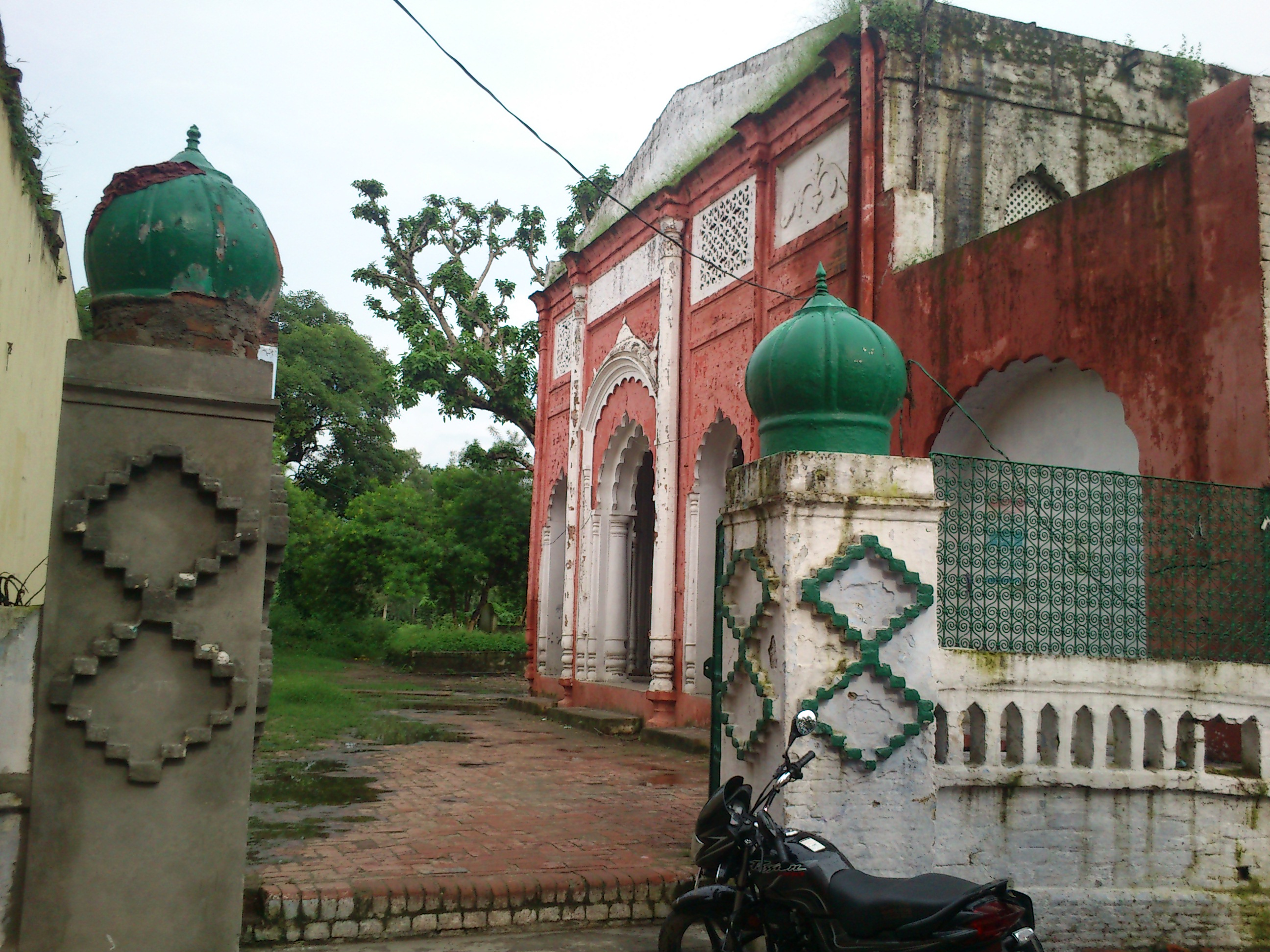
- Rauza Haz, Shah Abbas Badr-e-Chisti in Amroha

- Location of Amroha district in Uttar Pradesh
- Country: India
- State: Uttar Pradesh
- Division: Moradabad
- Established as a district: 24th April 1997
- Headquarters: Amroha
- Sub Division / Tehsils: 1. Amroha; 2. Hasanpur; 3. Dhanaura; 4. Naugawan Sadat

Government
  - Lok Sabha constituency: Amroha
  - Vidhan Sabha Seats: 1. 39Dhanaura (SC); 2. 40Naugawan Sadat; 3. 41Amroha; 4. 42Hasanpur

Area
  - Total: 2,321 km^{2} (896 sq mi)

Population (2011)
  - Total: 1,840,221
  - Density: 792.9/km^{2} (2,053/sq mi)
  - Urban: 56%

Demographics
  - Literacy: 50.21%
  - Sex ratio: 925
- Time zone: UTC+05:30 (IST)
- Vehicle registration: UP-23
- Average annual precipitation: 1,120 mm
- Website: Official Website

Amroha district is one of the 75 districts of the Indian state of Uttar Pradesh. Amroha was earlier a part of Moradabad district. On 15 April 1997, it was separated from Moradabad and made a new district. This district was named Jyotiba Phule Nagar, but in 2012 it was changed to Amroha. It is located in western India near the Ganga River region of Rohilkhand.

== History ==
The Battle of Amroha was fought between the Mongols and Alauddin Khilji on 20 December 1305. Alauddin won the battle. Later, the territory occupied by the present district was part of the Sambhal sarkar of Delhi subah under the Mughal Empire. Later it came under the control of Awadh. In 1801, the administration of this territory was ceded to the British East India Company by the Nawab of Awadh. On 24 April 1997, this district was carved out by separating Amroha, Dhanora and Hasanpur tehsils of the erstwhile Moradabad district. In 2012, this district was renamed from Jyotiba Phule Nagar district to Amroha district.

== Demographics ==
Historical population
| Year | Pop. | ±% p.a. |
|---|---|---|
| 1901 | 328,739 | — |
| 1911 | 348,293 | +0.58% |
| 1921 | 330,488 | −0.52% |
| 1931 | 354,024 | +0.69% |
| 1941 | 406,143 | +1.38% |
| 1951 | 457,922 | +1.21% |
| 1961 | 550,228 | +1.85% |
| 1971 | 681,551 | +2.16% |
| 1981 | 891,539 | +2.72% |
| 1991 | 1,155,742 | +2.63% |
| 2001 | 1,499,068 | +2.64% |
| 2011 | 1,840,221 | +2.07% |

According to the 2011 census, 'Amroha District' has a population of 1,840,221, roughly equal to the nation of Kosovo or the US state of Nebraska. This gives it a ranking of 258th in India (out of a total of 640). The population density is 818 inhabitants per square kilometre (2,120/sq mi) and the population growth rate over the decade 2001-2011 was 22.66%. Amroha has a sex ratio of 907 females for every 1,000 males, and a literacy rate of 65.7%. 24.93% of the population lived in urban areas. Scheduled Castes make up 17.28% of the population.

=== Religion ===
Religions in Amroha district (2011)
| Religion | Percent |
| Hinduism | 58.44% |
| Islam | 40.78% |
| Others† | 0.78% |
Distribution of religions †Includes Christians (0.32%), Sikhs (0.29%), Buddhists (<0.01%).

Even though the district is Hindu majority, Muslims form a significant minority and dominate urban areas. As per the 2011 census out of 9 Census towns Muslims formed the majority in 7 while Hindus were in majority in Gajraula (77.33%) and Dhanaura (66.38%) towns.

| Tehsil | Hindus | Muslims | Others |
|---|---|---|---|
| Dhanaura | 66.34% | 32.22% | 1.44% |
| Amroha | 45.32% | 53.94% | 0.74% |
| Hasanpur | 69.32% | 30.35% | 0.33% |

=== Language ===
Languages of Amroha district (2011)
1. Hindi (80.1%)
2. Urdu (19.7%)
3. Others (0.20%)

At the time of the 2011 Census of India, 80.10% of the population of the district spoke Hindi and 19.70% Urdu as their first language.

== Village & Panchayats ==
1. Tehsil – 4
2. Blocks – 6
3. Nayay Panchayats – 48
4. Panchayats – 601
5. Adarsh Rajasv Gram – 216
6. Village – 1133

== Notable people ==
- Ahmad Hasan Amrohi, Islamic scholar
- Kamal Amrohi, filmmaker, lyricist, actor, director, husband of Meena Kumari
- Dr. Azeem Amrohvi, poet and critic
- Dr Naseem uz Zafar Baquiri, poet, lyricist, doctor
- Jaun Elia, poet and columnist
- Nisar Ahmed Faruqi, scholar and authority on Sufism
- Eqbal Mehdi, artist
- Saiyed Zegham Murtaza, journalist, author, blogger and documentary film maker
- K. A. Nizami, historian
- Sadequain, (AKA Syed Sadequain Ahmed Naqvi) - artist
- Mohammed Shami, cricketer
- Nawab Waqar ul Mulk, educationalist, politician

== Media ==
Amroha has several active media groups which continuously give the populace Hindi news updates on Amroha:

- Amar Ujala
- Dainik Bhaskar
- Dainik Jagran
- Awam-e-hind
- Amroha ki Ekta(Hindi Weekly newspaper)
