= Gajraula =

Gajraula Gajgarh
- Town
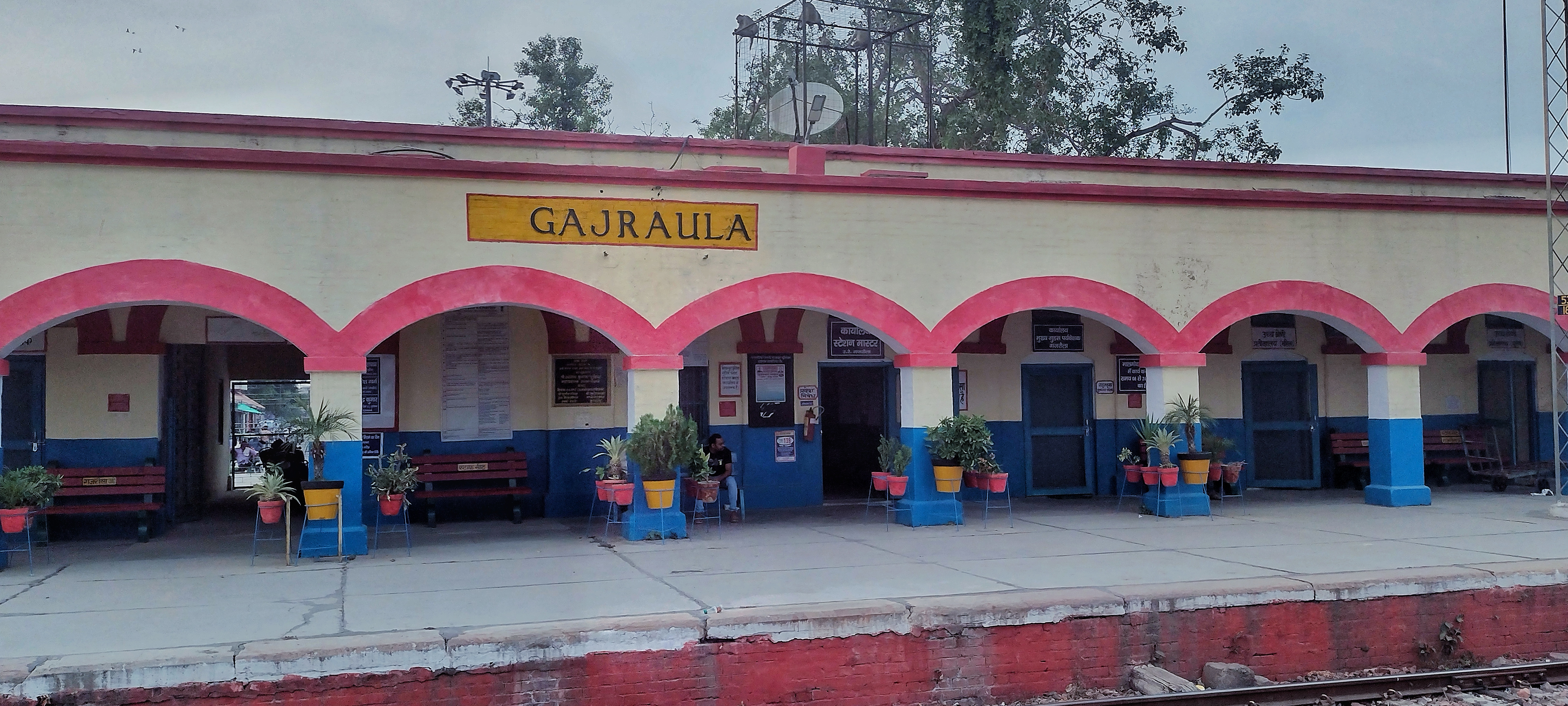
- Gajraula Jn Railway Station

- Location in Uttar Pradesh, India Gajraula (India)
- Coordinates: 28°50′05″N 78°14′38″E
- Country: India
- State: Uttar Pradesh
- District: Amroha
- Established: 1921

Area
  - Total: 21 km^{2} (8.1 sq mi)
  - Rank: 09
- Elevation: 257 m (843 ft)

Population (2011)
  - Total: 55,048
  - Rank: 18

Languages
  - Official: Hindi
- Time zone: UTC+5:30 (IST)
- PIN: 244235
- Telephone code: 05924
- Vehicle registration: UP-23

Gajraula is a town and municipal board in Amroha district in the state of Uttar Pradesh, India. Gajraula is also the headquarters of Gajraula block. It is located on NH 9, a four-lane highway connecting Uttarakhand and cities such as Bareilly and Lucknow via Delhi. Gajraula is a significant industrial hub in Uttar Pradesh and home to a number of multinational corporations, including Jubliant Life Sciences, RACL Geartech, and Israeli Pharma Teva API, as well as several engineering colleges. Moradabad, Meerut, Bulandsahar, Budaun, Hapur, and Delhi NCR are among the larger nearby cities.

== Geography ==
Gajraula is located at 28.85°N 78.23°E. It is 105 km (65 mi) away from New Delhi, the capital of India. River Ganga is just 7 km (4.3 mi) away from the city. It has an average elevation of 257 m (843 ft).

== Climate ==
Gajraula has been ranked the 18th-best National Clean Air City (under Category III: Cities with population under 3 lakh) in India according to the Swachh Vayu Survekshan 2024 Results.

== Demographics ==
As of the 2001 Census of India, Gajraula had a population of 39,826. Males constitute 53% of the population and females 47%. Gajraula has an average literacy rate of 69%, higher than the national average of 59.5%: male literacy is 74%, and female literacy is 66%. In Gajraula, 14% of the population is under 6 years of age.

== Transport ==
Gajraula is well connected through Indian Railways. Gajraula Railway Station is situated on Gajraula-Najibabad, Delhi-Lucknow line and all passenger trains and some of the express trains stop here. There are trains for location such as Varanasi, Allahabad, Delhi, Jaipur, Ahmedabad, Aligarh, etc.

Gajraula is located on NH-9 which is also AH2. It is also connected through SH 51 which is Badaun- Haridwar Highway. Every minute there is a bus to Delhi and Bareilly.

In city the commutation takes place through eco friendly e-rickshaws and autos.

== Notable people ==
- Saiyed Zegham Murtaza, journalist, columnist, author, blogger, documentary film maker
- Devendra Nagpal, politician, businessman
- Harish Nagpal, politician, businessman
- Pankaj Pushkar, politician, social worker
