= Hasanpur =

Hasanpur हसनपुर (Hindi) حسن پور (Urdu)
- City
- Location in Uttar Pradesh, India Hasanpur (India)
- Coordinates: 28.72°N 78.28°E
- Country: India
- State: Uttar Pradesh
- District: Amroha
- Established: 1634; 392 years ago
- Founder: Hasan Khan

Government
  - Body: Municipality
  - Chairman: Shri Rajpal Saini
  - MLA: Mahendra Singh Khadagvanshi
- Elevation: 201 m (659 ft)

Population (2011)
  - Total: 61,243

Languages
  - Official: Hindi, Urdu and English
- Time zone: UTC+5:30 (IST)
- Postal code: 244241
- Area code: (+91) (05924)
- Vehicle registration: UP 23
- Website: 1. Nagar Palika Parishad, Hasanpur; 2. Amroha District; 3. Government of Uttar Pradesh

Hasanpur is a city located in Amroha district of Uttar Pradesh state of India. The Hasanpur Municipality was officially established in 1952, with Nawab Yusuf Khan being elected as its first chairman. At that time, the chairman was elected by the board members rather than by direct public vote. In 1988, the first direct election for the position was held, in which Aftab Khan, an independent candidate, was elected as the chairman.

== History ==
Hasanpur is named after a Pathan ruler named Hasan Khan, also called Mubariz Khan, who drove out the previous Goshain rulers and gained control of the town in 1634. The Pathans remained the primary zamindars until the 20th century.

During the late 1800s, Hasanpur grew in importance as a trade centre, and some Banias became fairly wealthy, and its population increased from 8,082 in 1847 to 9,579 in 1901. At that time its population was about 50% Muslim and 50% Hindu. The neighboring settlement of Mubarakpur was incorporated into Hasanpur in 1877. In the early 20th century the main industry was cotton cloth. There was a police station, a dispensary, a sarai, a cattle pound, and a post office, along with one middle school, one primary school, and one girls' school. There were also two private schools, one teaching Arabic and the other teaching Sanskrit. The Arabic school was run by one Haji Ahmad Husain Khan

== Demographics ==
As of 2015 India census, Hasanpur had a population of 211,533 of which males constituted 57% of the population and females 43%. Hasanpur has an average literacy rate of 43% which is lower than the national average of 59.5%. The male literacy is 49% and female literacy rate is 37%. In Hasanpur, 18% of the population is under the age of 6.

== Governance and History ==
The Hasanpur Municipality was officially established in 1952. Its first chairman was Nawab Yusuf Khan, who was elected by the board members, as the system of direct public voting for the chairmanship was not in practice at that time.

The electoral process underwent a significant change in 1988, when the first direct election for the post of chairman was conducted. In this landmark election, Aftab Khan, contesting as an independent candidate, emerged victorious and became the first chairman to be directly elected by the people of Hasanpur.

== Economy and Culture ==
Hasanpur serves as the headquarters of the tehsil of the same name. The local economy is primarily driven by agriculture, with fruits, vegetables, and other farm produce significantly contributing to the regional markets.

The city has a rich literary and linguistic heritage. Urdu is widely spoken and respected across generations, and there is a strong inclination towards Urdu poetry (Shayari) and literature among the residents.

== Geography and River ==
Hasanpur is located in close proximity to the Ganga River, which flows along the western boundary of the Amroha district. The river plays a crucial role in the local ecology and agriculture, making the surrounding plains highly fertile for cultivating crops like sugarcane, wheat, and paddy. The low-lying floodplains near the river, locally known as the Khadir region, are prominently utilized for seasonal farming and fruit orchards.

== Religion ==
According to the Census of India 2011, Hasanpur has a Muslim majority population.

Religion in Hasanpur (2011)
Hindu	34.55%
Muslim	64.97%
Christian	0.26%
Sikh	0.03%
No religion	0.18%

Religion in Hasanpur (Census 2011)
Religion	Percentage
Hindu	34.55%
Muslim	64.97%
Christian	0.26%
Sikh	0.03%
Buddhist	0.00%
Jain	0.00%
Others	0.00%
No Religion	0.18%

Hasanpur Nagar Palika Parishad Ward List (2011 Census Data)
#	Ward Name	Population
1	Hasanpur Ward No - 1	3,485
2	Hasanpur Ward No - 2	1,959
3	Hasanpur Ward No - 3	2,946
4	Hasanpur Ward No - 4	3,026
5	Hasanpur Ward No - 5	2,315
6	Hasanpur Ward No - 6	2,864
7	Hasanpur Ward No - 7	1,968
8	Hasanpur Ward No - 8	2,280
9	Hasanpur Ward No - 9	2,086
10	Hasanpur Ward No - 10	2,468
11	Hasanpur Ward No - 11	2,129
12	Hasanpur Ward No - 12	2,818
13	Hasanpur Ward No - 13	1,977
14	Hasanpur Ward No - 14	1,966
15	Hasanpur Ward No - 15	2,406
16	Hasanpur Ward No - 16	2,432
17	Hasanpur Ward No - 17	2,334
18	Hasanpur Ward No - 18	1,980
19	Hasanpur Ward No - 19	2,770
20	Hasanpur Ward No - 20	3,203
21	Hasanpur Ward No - 21	3,080
22	Hasanpur Ward No - 22	2,286
23	Hasanpur Ward No - 23	2,167
24	Hasanpur Ward No - 24	2,495
25	Hasanpur Ward No - 25	1,803
Total Population		61,243

== Notable people ==
- Himmat Sinha (born 1928–2023), philosopher
- Rajiv Kumar – Former Chief Election Commissioner of India; born in Hasanpur, Amroha district, Uttar Pradesh.
- Several local politicians and social workers from Hasanpur constituency have represented the area in the Uttar Pradesh Legislative Assembly.
