= List of Modern School alumni =

The Modern School (informally Modern School or Modern) is an independent day-cum-boarding school in New Delhi, India founded in 1920 by Lala Raghubir Singh, a prominent Delhi philanthropist and businessman. The first principal was Mrs. Kamala Bose who moved from Calcutta to head the school. The best known alumnus is former Indian Prime Minister Indira Gandhi.

Note: The sub-headings are given as a general guide and some names might fit under more than one category.

== Government ==
Name	Class year	Notability	Ref.
Indira Gandhi Indira Gandhi, Prime Minister of India		Former Prime Minister of India	
Rahul Gandhi		Leader of Opposition in Lok Sabha, Member of Parliament and General Secretary, Indian National Congress; completed RSJMS and transferred	
Priyanka Gandhi		General Secretary, Eastern Uttar Pradesh, All India Congress Committee	
Sandeep Dikshit		Member of Parliament and member of the Indian National Congress	
Varun Gandhi		Member of Parliament and National Secretary, Bharatiya Janata Party; completed RSJMS and transferred	
Raghav Chadha		Rajya Sabha member of the Aam Aadmi Party	

== Judiciary ==
Name	Class year	Notability	Ref.
Justice Bhupinder Nath Kirpal Justice B.N. Kirpal	1954	Former Chief Justice of India	
Justice Mukul Mudgal	1966	Former Chief Justice of Punjab and Haryana High Court	
Justice Sanjay Kishan Kaul	1976	Judge, Supreme Court of India	
Justice Sanjiv Khanna	1977	Chief Justice of India (2024)	
Justice Manmohan	1981	Judge, Supreme Court of India	
Justice Madan B. Lokur	1970	Judge, Supreme Court of India and Supreme Court of Fiji	
Mukul Rohatgi	1972	Attorney General of India	

== Business ==
Name	Class year	Notability	Ref.
Dr. Bharat Ram	1930	Chairman and Managing Director, Delhi Cloth & General Mills; founded Shri Ram Fibres in 1970, renamed SRF Limited in 1990	
Rajat Gupta		Managing Director, McKinsey & Company and founder of Indian School of Business	
Surinder Mehta	1975	Founder of Prime Group	
Gurcharan Das	1959	CEO, Procter & Gamble	
Rakesh Kapoor		CEO, Reckitt Benckiser	

== Diplomats and Bureaucrats ==
Name	Class year	Notability	Ref.
Gopal Krishna Gandhi	1961	Governor of West Bengal and Bihar	
Arun Shourie	1958	Minister of Communications and Information Technology	
Amitabh Kant	1973	CEO, NITI Aayog	

== Medicine ==
Name	Class year	Notability	Ref.
Dr. Naresh Trehan	1962	Cardiovascular and cardiothoracic surgeon; chairman and managing director of Medanta The Medicity	
Dr. Arvind Lal	1966	Pathologist and founder of Dr Lal PathLabs	
Noshir Minoo Shroff	1968	Ophthalmologist and founder of Shroff Eye Hospital	

== Sports ==
Name	Class year	Notability	Ref.
Gautam Gambhir	2000	International cricketer and Member of Parliament, Bharatiya Janata Party	
Ronjan Sodhi	1997	Shooter; first Indian shooter to defend his world title in the double trap event at the 2010 World Cup Final in Turkey	
Gaurav Ghei	1986	Professional golfer	
Daniel Chopra	1992	Indian-origin Swedish professional golfer	
Bhaskar Pillai	1980	Cricketer	
Kirti Azad	1976	Cricketer; member of the Indian team that won the 1983 Cricket World Cup	
Shweta Sehrawat	2022	Vice-captain of the India women's national under-19 cricket team for the 2023 Under-19 Women's T20 World Cup	
Sharad Kumar		Paralympic bronze medallist	
Ayush Badoni	2016	Cricketer	
Himmat Singh	2016	Cricketer	
Vaibhav Suri		Chess player	
Samaresh Jung		Shooter	
Jasjit Singh (tennis)	1964	Tennis player; Davis Cup player	
Vishal Uppal		Indian tennis player	
Unmukt Chand		Indian-origin cricketer	
Prithu Gupta		Chess grandmaster	

== Armed Forces ==
Name	Class year	Notability	Ref.
Pratap Chandra Lal	1933	Chief of Air Staff, Indian Air Force and recipient of the Padma Bhushan and Padma Vibhushan	
Surinder Mehra	1948	Chief of Air Staff, Indian Air Force	
Vijay Lall	1958	Director General Ordnance Services and Senior Colonel Commandant AOC, Indian Army	

== Literature ==
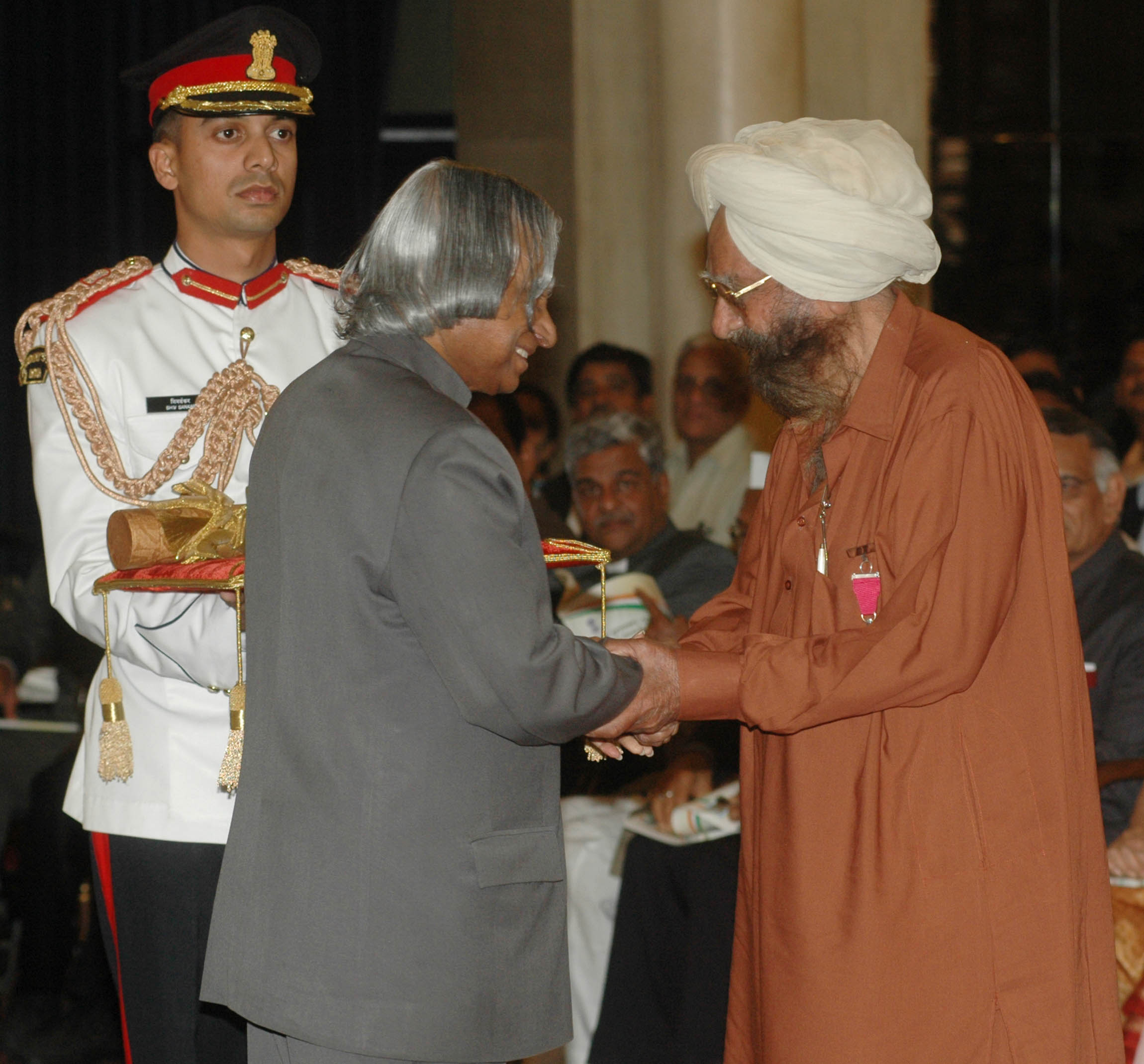
Khushwant Singh

Name	Class year	Notability	Ref.
Khushwant Singh	1930	Novelist, columnist, Member of Parliament (Rajya Sabha), and former editor of The Illustrated Weekly of India, The National Herald, and Hindustan Times	

== Arts ==
Name	Class year	Notability	Ref.
Shekhar Kapur	1962	Filmmaker	
Amjad Ali Khan	1963	Sarod maestro	
Madhup Mudgal	1973	Indian classical vocalist	
Yamini Reddy		Classical dancer and Kuchipudi exponent	

=== Architecture ===
Name	Notability	Ref.
Ratish Nanda	Architect, Aga Khan Trust for Culture, India	
Aman Nath	Chairman, Neemrana Hotels	
Rajeev Sethi	Designer, scenographer and art curator	

=== Films and entertainment ===
Name	Notability	Ref.
Abhishek Bachchan Amjad Ali Khan	Actor	
Gauri Khan	Film producer	
Amrita Singh	Actress	
Karan Soni	Indian-born American actor	

=== Music ===
Name	Notability	Ref.
Ustad Amjad Ali Khan	Indian classical sarod player, best known for his clear and fast ekhara taans; awarded the Padma Vibhushan in 2001	
