= Arvinder =

Arvinder is both a given name and a surname.

Notable people with the given name include:

- Arvinder Singh Bubber, Canadian academic administrator
- Arvinder Singh Lovely (born 1968), India politician
- Arvinder Singh Soin (born 1963), Indian surgeon

Notable people with the surname include:

- Erik Arvinder (born 1984), Swedish violinist, multi-instrumentalist, arranger and orchestrator
