= Vijay Lall =

Indian Army General

Lt General Vijay Lall PVSM, AVSM, ADC
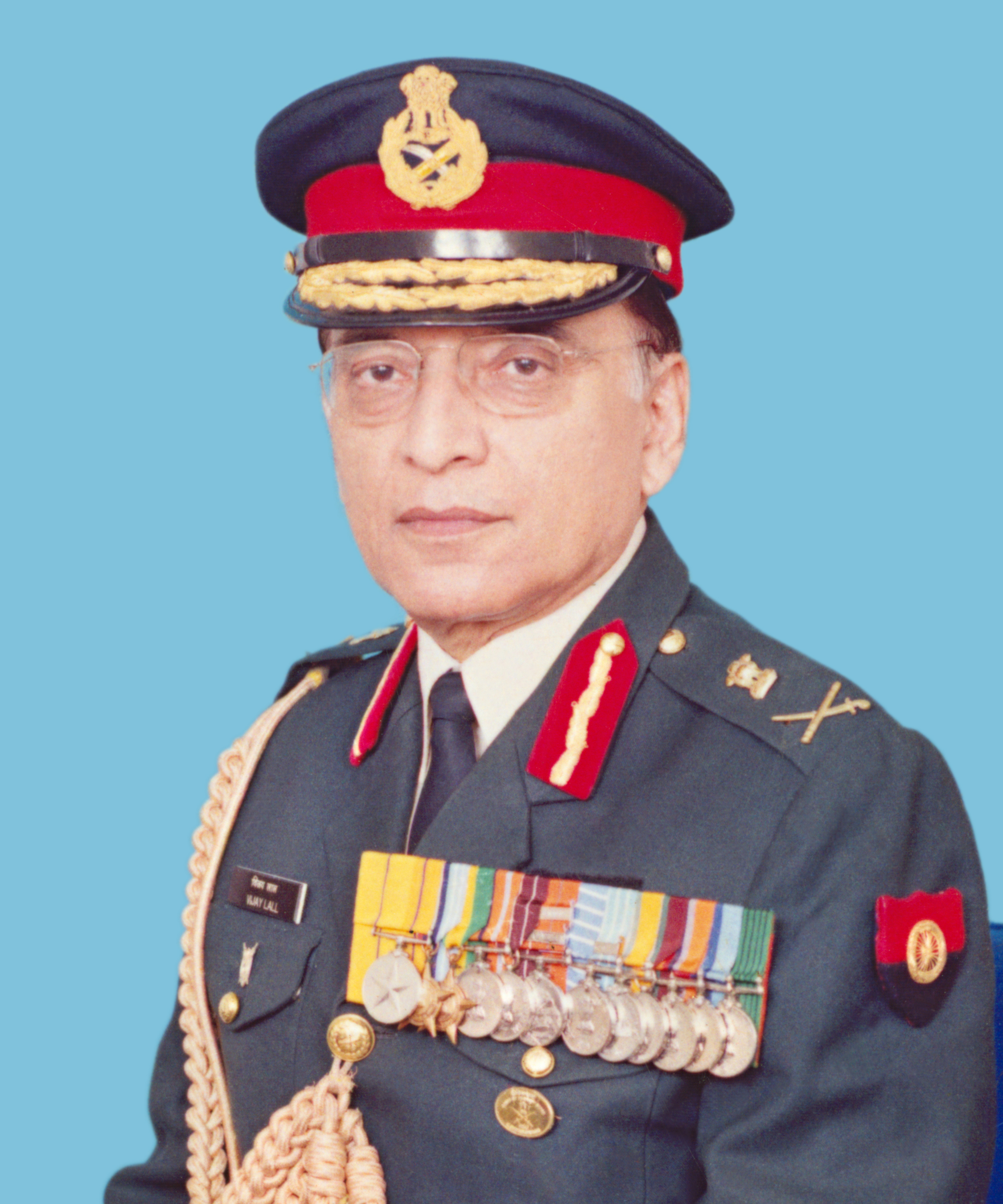
- Official Portrait, 2002
- Alma mater: Modern School, New Delhi; National Defence Academy; Indian Military Academy; Military College of Materials Management; College of Defence Management; Indian Institute of Public Administration; Army War College; Rani Durgavati Vishwavidyalaya; University of Jabalpur
- Spouse: Dr Veena Lall (m. 1967)
- Children: 2
- Military career
- Allegiance: India
- Service: Indian Army
- Service years: 1962–2002
- Rank: Lt General
- Service number: IC-13306F
- Unit: AOC
- Commands: DGOS; M C M M COD Dehu Road; DOU 7 Inf Div; N A CSC; OMC 27 Div; M A R S 27 Mountain Div
- Wars: Sino-Indian War of 1962; Indo-Pakistan War of 1965; Indo-Pakistan War of 1971 (Bangladesh Liberation War); Indo-Pakistan War of 1999 (Kargil War) (Operation Vijay)
- Awards: Param Vishisht Seva Medal Ati Vishisht Seva Medal Chief Of Army Staff Commendation
- Other work: Director – IMCL (Apollo Hospitals Group); Adviser, IIMM; Member, MP - Institute for Defence Studies and Analyses; Member, United Services Institute of India

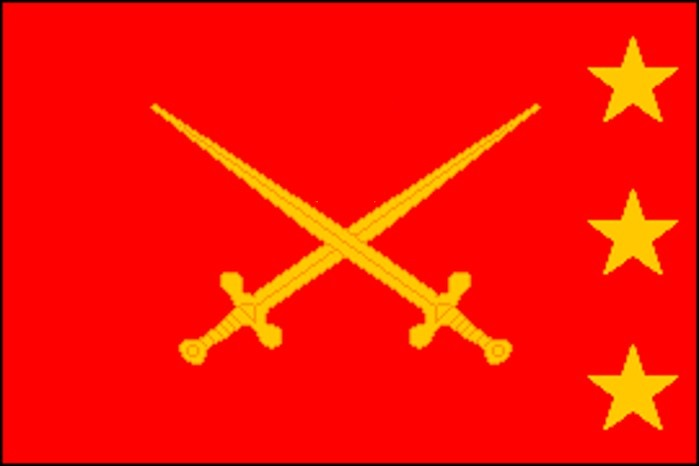

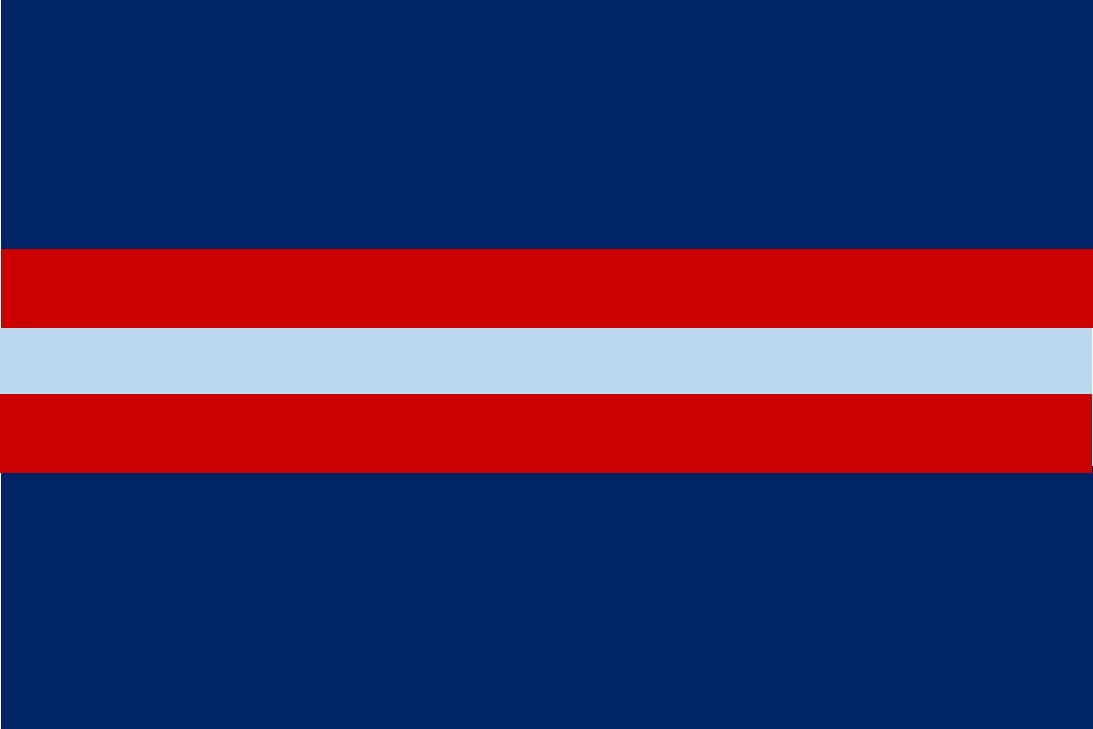

Lt General Vijay Lall, PVSM, AVSM, ADC (Hindi pronunciation: [vɪdʒeː laːl]) is a veteran Indian Army General Officer. His military career spanned about four decades, where he last served as the 15th Indian Director General Ordnance Services of the Army. He was also the Senior Colonel Commandant AOC. Vjay is the 1st Director General Ordnance Services of this new millennium.

== Early life and education ==
He did his schooling at the Modern School, Barakhamba Road, New Delhi. He joined the National Defence Academy, Khadakwasla, Pune (NDA) in 1958 followed by the Indian Military Academy, Dehradun (IMA); graduating in June 1962.

In addition, Vijay is an alumnus of various defence and civil training institutions namely the Military College of Materials Management (MCMM), Jabalpur; College of Defence Management (CDM), Secunderabad; Indian Institute of Public Administration (IIPA), New Delhi and Army War College (AWC), Mhow.

== Military career ==
Vijay was commissioned in the AOC on 10 June 1962. He completed his infantry attachment with Third-First Gorkha Rifles (PVC Battalion) where he was a Platoon Commander in the Bravo company. During his career, he held various command, staff, instructional and regimental appointments. He is a specialist in Materials management, ammunition and explosives technology and holds a master's degree in Materials Management from University of Jabalpur.(RDVV)

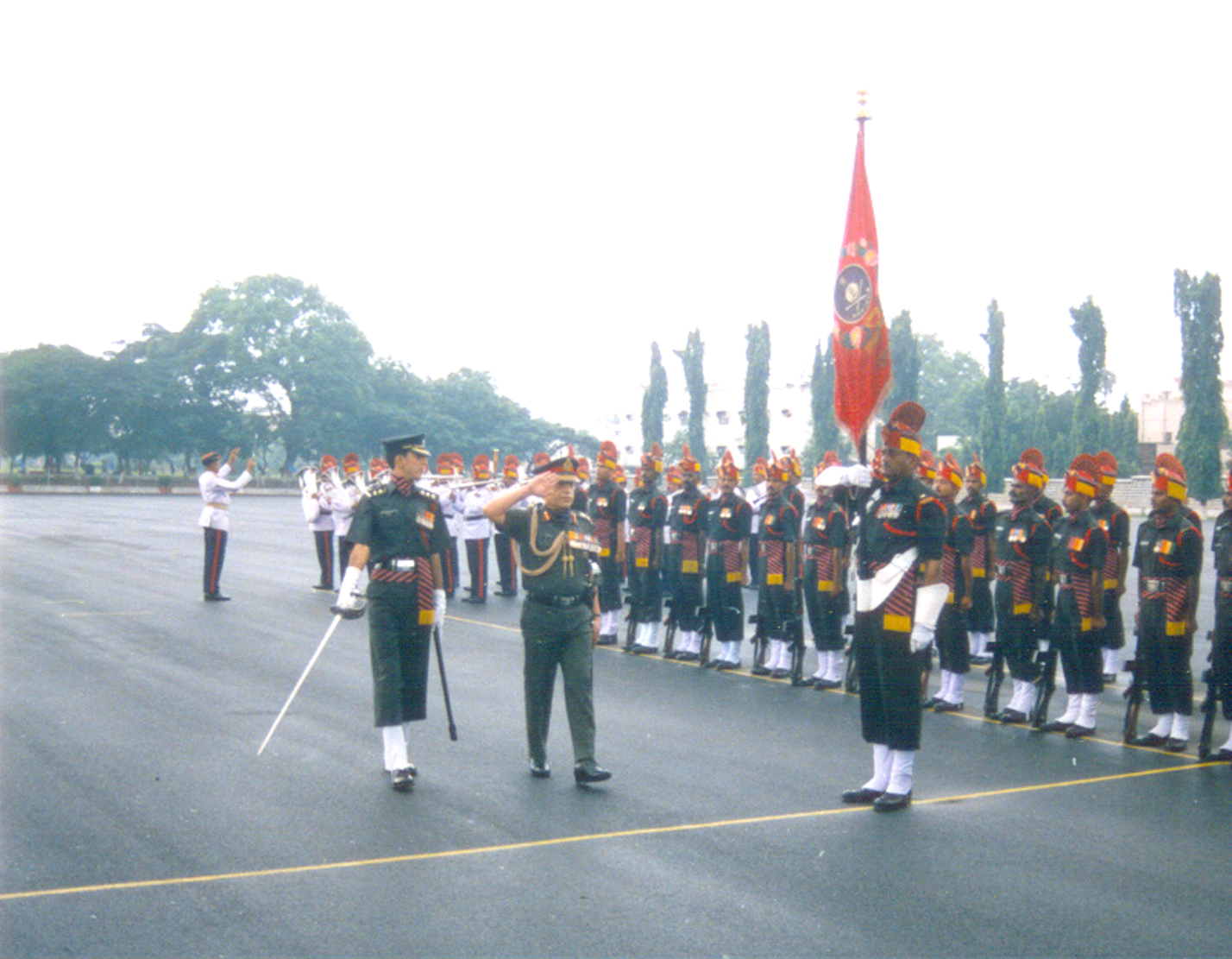
Assumption of Office Guard of Honour Lt General Vijay Lall, PVSM, AVSM, ADC

He commanded units after attaining the rank of Captain up to Lt General. His various command appointments include commanding a Mobile Ammunition Repair Section (MARS), Ordnance Maintenance Company(OMC), an Independent Foreign Army Unit in Nigeria (during the years 1979–1981), a Division Ordnance Unit.

Besides, he also served in staff appointments as the Assistant Adjutant General(AAG) of a Sub-Area and Director-Coordination at Army Headquarters.

Promoted to the rank of Brigadier, Vijay assumed the office of Commandant, COD Dehu Road and in addition was also the Station Commander of the Military Garrison & President of the Cantonment Board. Succeeding this, he was the Deputy Director General at Army Headquarters.

After promotion to Major General, he took over as MGAOC (Southern Command).

Following which, he was selected to be Member Army (Ex-Officio Joint Secretary to Government of India) of Special Surplus Stores Disposal Committee, a high-level empowered committee of the Ministry of Defence. Vijay thereafter served as Additional Director General at Army Headquarters.

After promotion to the rank of Lt General, he was appointed as the 33 rd Commandant of the Military College of Materials Management.

On 1 Jan 2001, the Government of India appointed him as the 15th Director General Ordnance Services.

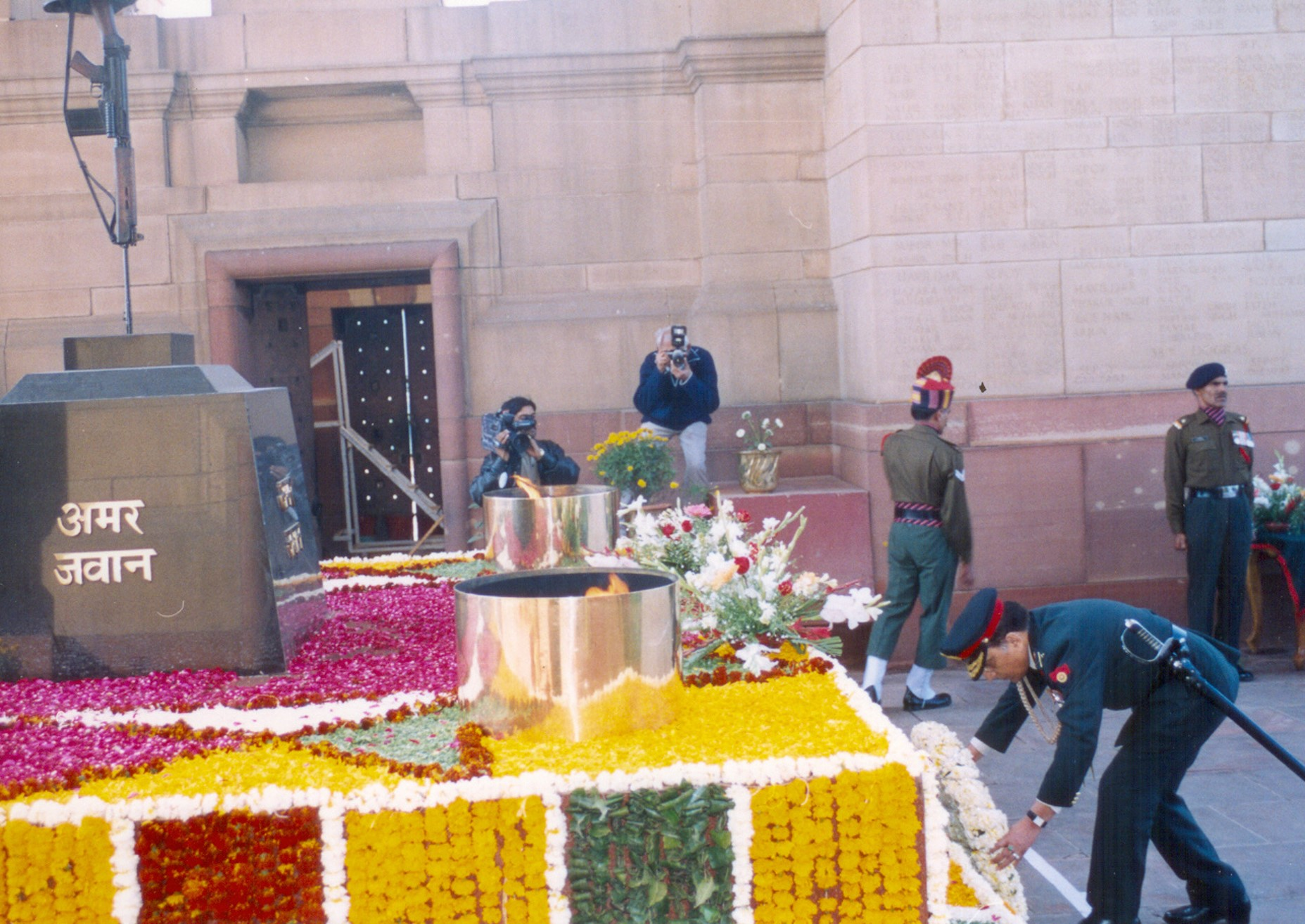
Lt General Vijay Lall, PVSM, AVSM, ADC paying homage at Amar Jawan Jyoti, India Gate(now merged at National War Memorial) after taking over as Director General Ordnance Services

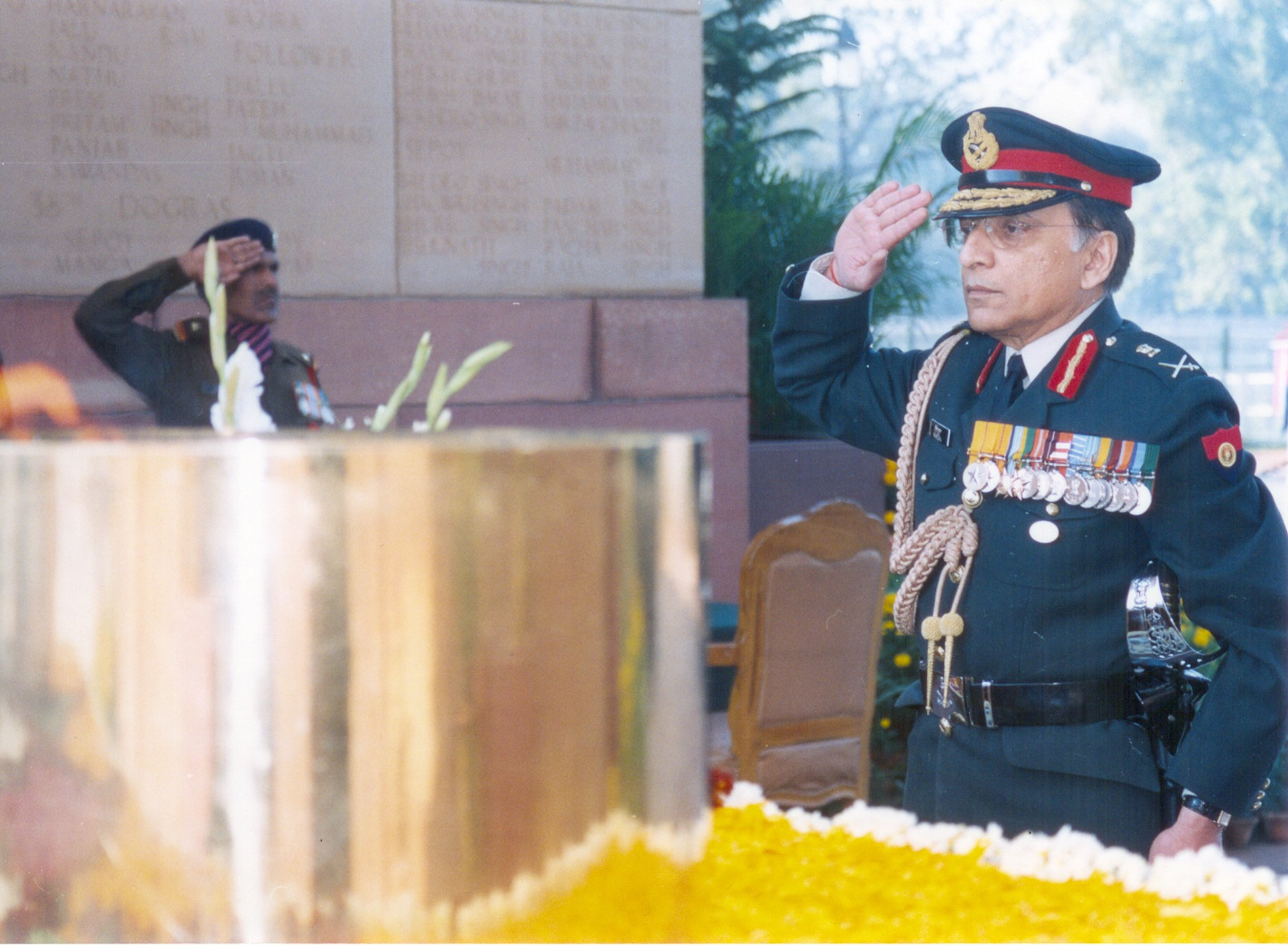
Lt General Vijay Lall, PVSM, AVSM, ADC paying homage at Amar Jawan Jyoti, India Gate(now merged at the National War Memorial) after taking over as Director General Ordnance Services

He was awarded by the President of India twice for distinguished services and Commendation by the Chief of Army Staff (COAS) during his career.

== Honours and awards ==

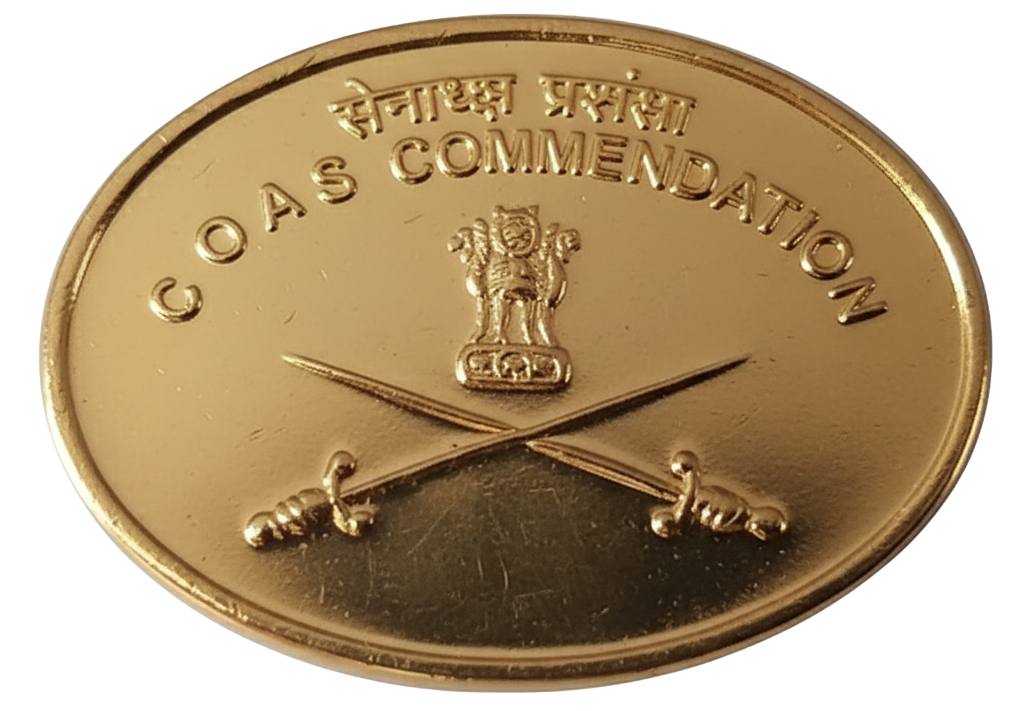

He has received the following medals, decorations and commendations in his military career:

- Param Vishisht Seva Medal for distinguished services of the most exceptional order to the nation. (India's highest peace time medal of the Armed Forces)
- Ati Vishisht Seva Medal for distinguished services of an exceptional order to the nation.
- Chief of Army Staff Commendation

| Param Vishisht Seva Medal | | Ati Vishisht Seva Medal | |
| Samar Seva Star | Poorvi Star | | Raksha Medal |
| Sangram Medal | Sainya Seva Meda | Videsh Seva Medal | 50th Anniversary of Independence Medal |
| 25th Anniversary of Independence Medal | 30 Years Long Service Medal | 20 Years Long Service Medal | 9 Years Long Service Medal |

Besides these, he was appointed as Honorary Army Aide-de-Camp to the President of India.

Vijay was responsible for securing the coveted Golden Peacock National Training Award in the year 2000 for the Military College of Materials Management (MCMM), Jabalpur, Madhya Pradesh. He received the award from the then Home Minister and Deputy Prime Minister of India.

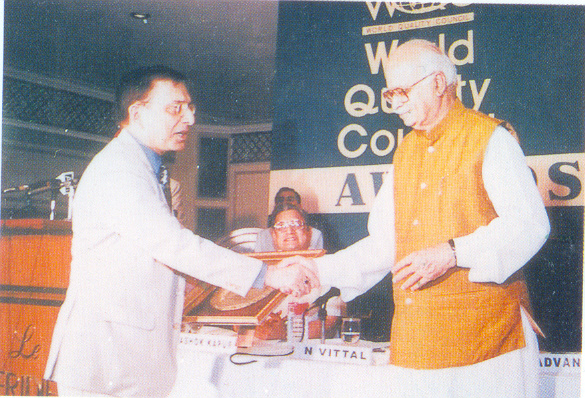
Lt General Vijay Lall, AVSM receiving the Golden Peacock National Training Award 2000 from Shri L K Advani, Honourable Home Minister and Dy. Prime Minister of India

He was awarded Modernites Excellence Award 2013 by The Modern School Old Students Association (MSOSA),

== Dates of rank ==
| Insignia | Rank | Component | Date of rank |
|---|---|---|---|
| | Second Lieutenant | Indian Army | 10 Jun 1962 |
| | Lieutenant | Indian Army | 10 Jun 1964 |
| | Captain | Indian Army | Jun 1965 |
| | Major | Indian Army | 1 May 1971 |
| | Lieutenant-Colonel | Indian Army | Aug 1981 |
| | Colonel | Indian Army | Sep 1985 |
| | Brigadier | Indian Army | Aug 1989 |
| | Major General | Indian Army | Sep 1993 |
| | Lieutenant-General | Indian Army | 5 Dec 1997 |

== Other assignments ==
Professor (Management), Rani Durgavati Vishwavidyalaya, RDVV (Formerly, University of Jabalpur) Jabalpur, Madhya Pradesh

Dean of Management, Rani Durgavati Vishwavidyalaya, RDVV (Formerly, University of Jabalpur) Jabalpur, Madhya Pradesh

Member; Executive Council, Rani Durgavati Vishwavidyalaya, RDVV (Formerly, University of Jabalpur) Jabalpur, Madhya Pradesh

President, Dehu Road Cantonment Board, Pune District, Maharashtra

Director on the Board of Directors of Indraprastha Medical Corporation Limited (Apollo Hospitals Group)

He is also a:

- Fellow, All India Management Association
- Distinguished Fellow, Institute of Directors
- Distinguished Fellow, Indian Institute of Materials Management
- Member, MP - Institute for Defence Studies and Analyses
- Member, United Services Institute of India
