= Desh Gaurav Sekhri =

Desh Gaurav Sekhri is a specialist in policy (Governance and Law) as well as a sports lawyer, columnist and author. He is currently Officer on Special Duty at NITI Aayog, the think tank of the Government of India working on Governance, Law, and Sports policy matters, a position he has held since September 2017. Prior to that he headed the sports law practice of J. Sagar Associates, a national law firm in India, a position he held from February 2009- August 2016.

Sekhri is a frequent columnist in Business Standard, The Economic Times, The Indian Express, and The Financial Express. He writes primarily on governance, law, and sports (including sports law, sports policy, and the business of sports). Sekhri is the author of the non-fiction book, Not Out! The incredible story of the Indian Premier League.

== Education ==
Sekhri has studied in both India and the United States of America, completing his schooling from Modern School in New Delhi. He then completed his B.A. (Honors) in Economics from St. Stephen’s College, Delhi. A junior (under-18) national finalist in India in lawn tennis, Sekhri attended the University of Iowa in the United States for a B.A. (with Honors) in Economics. Sekhri graduated with a Juris Doctor in Sports & Corporate law from the William and Mary Law School in Williamsburg, Virginia. He is licensed to practice law in New York and India.

== Book ==
Not Out! The incredible story of the Indian Premier League, chronicles the rise of India's domestic T20 cricket league, the Indian Premier League - its business dynamics, the recent controversies and interplay with the judiciary, and a road map for the way ahead. The book was released on 5 April 2016, and published by Penguin Random House.
