= Datar =

Datar or DATAR may refer to:

== People ==
- Bhaurao Datar (1903–1982), Indian actor
- B. N. Datar (1894–1963), Indian politician
- Chetan Datar, Indian playwright
- Chhaya Datar (b. 1944), Indian activist
- Dhananjay Datar, Indian businessman
- D. K. Datar (1932–2018), Indian violinist
- Isha Datar (b. 1988)
- Madhura Datar, Indian singer
- Sadashir Datar (1885–?), Indian long-distance runner
- Shailesh Datar, Indian actor
- Srikant Datar, American economist
- Vinay Datar, one of the creators of the Datar–Mathews method for real option valuation
- Datar Kaur (c. 1784–1838), a daughter of Sardar Ran Singh Nakai, the third ruler of Nakai Misl of Baherwal

== Groups, organizations, companies ==
- Danny and Tarentella and Redanka, a musical group featuring Danny Tenaglia
- Délégation interministérielle à l'aménagement du territoire et à l'attractivité régionale, a French governmental administration

== Other uses ==
- DATAR, a computerized battlefield information system.
- Datar, Indonesia

== See also ==
- Data (disambiguation)
