= Modern School (New Delhi) =

Modern School, Barakhamba Road, New Delhi

Location
- Barakhamba Road; New Delhi, Delhi, 110 001; India; 28°37′42″N 77°13′46″E

Information
- Type: Private
- Motto: Self-realization cannot be achieved by weak willed.
- Established: 1920; 106 years ago
- Founder: Lala Raghubir Singh
- Sister school: Modern School Vasant Vihar, Modern School Kundli and Modern School, Faridabad
- School board: Central Board of Secondary Education
- Principal: Vijay Datta
- Faculty: 130
- Gender: Co-educational
- Age: 10 to 18
- Enrolment: 2560
- Campus size: 27 acres (110,000 m^{2})
- Campus type: Urban.
- Houses: 16
- Alumni association: Modern School Old Students' Association
- Colour: Blue Grey
- Publication: Sandesh and The Modern School Chronicles (now known as The Red Brick Times)
- Alumni: Modernites
- Website: modernschool.net

Modern School is a co-educational, private school in New Delhi, India. It was founded in 1920 by Lala Raghubir Singh, a prominent Delhi-based businessman and philanthropist, who desired an institution that combined the "best of ancient Indian tradition with the needs of the times." It was the first private and coeducational school established in Delhi after the capital of the British Raj shifted to the city.

The school's first principal, Kamala Bose, was a vigorous advocate of educational reform in India. Her founding vision, coupled with Lala Raghubir Singh's nationalist leanings, gave the school a liberal and indigenous character that stood in contrast to colonially-inspired public schools, which were intended for Indian aristocracy. The school motto is "Nyaymatma Balheenien Labhya," which translates to "Self-realization cannot be achieved by the weak".

Modern School enrolls about 2,500 pupils, most admitted directly from its junior branch, the Raghubir Singh Junior Modern School. Students write the Central Board of Secondary Education examinations in the tenth grade, and the All India Senior School Certificate Examination(AISSCE) in the twelfth grade.

Modern School, Barakhamba Road is consistently ranked well among Indian schools. The primary branch attended by students through Grade 5 – Raghubir Singh Junior Modern School – was established in 1961 on a separate campus on Humayun Road, New Delhi. Although primarily a coeducational day school, the school provides campus housing for several students

== History ==
=== Origins ===
The founder, Lala Sundar Pandit Singh, was born in 1895 and educated by William W. Pearson, a Protestant educator. Lala was an established engineer and philanthropist and astronomer from the community. His father, Sardar Sultan Pandit Singh, an accountant and banker (khazanchi) with the Imperial Bank of India, was well-regarded by both the British and the Indian aristocracy. At the time of WW2 the Japanese had made it a military camp, destroyed by British Army.

A sister school, Modern School, Vasant Vihar, was established in South Delhi in 1975. Three additional National Capital Region campuses have since been established in Kundli, Haryana, Faridabad, Haryana, and Ghaziabad, Uttar Pradesh.

=== Principals ===
Reflecting its founder's pan-India vision, Kamala Bose, the school's first principal, was recruited from Calcutta (now Kolkata). Bose championed the need for better educational facilities in a country shaking off its colonial yoke, noting, "If the education imparted to the people has been seriously lacking in quantity, it has been still more sadly wanting in quality."

=== The crest ===
Designed by the artist Sarada Ukil, a teacher at Modern School in the 1920s, the school crest signifies the circle of eternity crossed by the three elements in human development: body, mind and spirit, as the sun shines between the triangle and the circle. Inside the triangle, there is a banyan tree to represent stability and firmness of character, the swan and the lotus represent refinement, culture, and the arts which are fundamental elements of progress in life.

=== Golden Jubilee Hostel ===
The school has a student dormitory capable of housing 69 boys.

=== Houses ===
In keeping with its nationalist origins, the school's house system honours significant figures in the history of India, namely Akbar, Ashoka, Azad, Gandhi, Kalam, Lajpat, Laxmibai, Nehru, Patel, Pratap, Ranjit, Shastri, Shivaji, Subhas, Tagore, and Tilak.

== School activities ==
=== Clubs and societies ===
Extracurricular activities are a compulsory element of school life at Modern. The school magazine, Sandesh, is published each school term in English and Hindi (its sister publications include the Vasant Parag at Modern School, Vasant Vihar, and Prayas at Modern School, Kundli). There are around twenty clubs and societies, including photography, aero-modelling, drama, painting, sculpture, community service, carpentry, Dance, music, senior and junior English debating societies, economics, astronomy, computer science, physics, and robotics. In many societies pupils come together to discuss a particular topic, presided over by a faculty member and often including a guest speaker. The school has often invited prominent figures to give speeches and talks to the students; these have included heads of state, politicians, ornithologists, naturalists, artists, writers, economists, diplomats, and industrialists. The Modern School Leadership lecture series invites prominent alumni to address the school assembly twice every school year. Major clubs include The Lenskraft Photography Club, The Quiz Club, Model UN Society, Environment Club, Bits 'N' Bytes (The computer club), Debating Society, Interact Club, SPIC MACAY, Mudra Dance Club, SAPTAK and the Commerce Society.

Modern School is also a leading member of the Model United Nations and its biennial ModMUN conference is one of the biggest in Asia attracting as many as 900 international students for the 2016 conference. Due to its size, prestige, and popularity, it is considered the largest student organized MUN in India. Bits 'N' Bytes is one of the oldest school societies dating back to 1988. It organizes ACCESS, an annual tech symposium, in the month of December. In 2013, the society won the TCS IT Wiz and simultaneously celebrated its Silver Jubilee. The Debating Society is very active during the school year, as it hosts the Raghubir Singh Inter-school Debate, the Pratap Singh Inter-school Debate, and usually helps organize the Annual MSOSA Inter-school Debate. Interact Club (affiliate club of Rotary International's service club for students between the age of 12–18) was inaugurated in 1983 by the then vice-president of India, Muhammad Hidayat Ullah, and has since grown into a prominent school society. Its activities include donations to orphanages, recycling drives, ant-piracy drives, and an annual blood donation camp. The club has been awarded a certificate in recognition of its services to the community by Chief Minister of Delhi, Sheila Dikshit. Interact Club nominates some of its students to be selected by Rotary International for its international program to represent India as ambassador of goodwill to neighboring countries such as Pakistan and Sri Lanka. The selected students stay as guests with families who participate in this international youth exchange program. SPIC MACAY, a national society for the promotion of Indian classical music and culture amongst youth, organizes a SPIC MACAY week every school term. Past performers include Pandit Shiv Kumar Sharma, Ustad Bismillah Khan, Sonal Mansingh, Sitara Devi, Ustad Amjad Ali Khan, Hari Prasad Chaurasia, and Birju Maharaj. Other events organized include Cyclotron (the annual inter-school physics symposium) and Unquestionably Modern (an annual quiz competition).

=== Model UN ===
Modern School is also a leading member of the Model United Nations and its annual ModMUN conference is one of the biggest in Asia attracting as many as 1000 international students for the 2016 conference. Due to its size, prestige, and popularity, it is considered the largest student organized MUN in India.

== Affiliations ==
=== Ties with other schools ===
From its foundation in 1920, Modern School housed classes from Montessori to Grade 12. This ended in 1961 when Raghubir Singh Junior Modern School was established on Humayun Road as the school's primary wing. In 1975, Modern School, Vasant Vihar was founded as the first sister school under the leadership of Mr. Ved Vyas, a well regarded Hindi teacher at Modern School, Barakhamba Road. Similarly, in 2014, another sister school was established in Kundli under the directorship of Mrs. Neelam Puri, a former junior headmistress at Modern School, Barakhamba Road. In its early years the school also shared a close relationship with St. Stephen's College, Delhi.

The school has exchange programs with a number of overseas schools. As of September 2012, a small number of Modern School students were attending Brisbane Grammar School, Australia;Malay College, Malaysia; St. George's Girls' School, Malaysia; Clifton School, South Africa; and Peddie School, New Jersey, United States. Other schools include The Second High School Attached to Beijing Normal University and New Oriental School of Foreign Languages in China, Liebigschule Gießen in Germany, Philippine Science High School in the Philippines, SMA Negari 4 Denser School in Indonesia, Chua Chu Kang Secondary School in Singapore, and Dominion High School in Virginia, United States. Since 2010, Modern has twinned with Chua Chu Kang Secondary School, Singapore under the Twinning Program. It is also a part of ISA, UKIERI, and Australia India Collaboration. Modern also collaborates with The Collegiate School, Richmond, Virginia, in organizing the Community Development and Leadership Summit and the International Emerging Leaders Conference.

=== Schools with similar names ===
"Modern" is commonly used in the names of several unrelated Indian schools.

=== Memberships ===
The Modern School is a member of the Indian Public Schools' Conference (IPSC), National Progressive Schools' Conference (NPSC), Round Square Conference and the Central Board of Secondary Education (CBSE).

== Public image ==
Modern in Films, Television, and Theatre

- In Shekhar Kapur's 1983 film Masoom, Rinky (Urmila Matondkar) and Minni (Aradhana Srivastav) are wearing Modern School uniforms in two scenes.
- The radio station exteriors in the 2006 Bollywood film Rang De Basanti were shot at Modern School, Barakhamba Road.
- Rajendra Theatre was used for Albert Brooks' stand-up performance sequence in the film Looking for Comedy in the Muslim World.
- In Yeh Jawaani Hai Deewani, the lead characters Kabir Thapar, played by Ranbir Kapoor, and Naina Talwar, played by Deepika Padukone, are scripted as Modernites. They talk about their school days at Modern School, Barakhamba Road during the first half of the film.
- In Hindi Medium, the protagonist Raj, played by Irrfan Khan, is trying to help his child get admitted to the (fictitious) Delhi Grammar school, which is portrayed at Modern School's campus; however, the name is avoided. Several scenes of the film were shot at the school's premises.

Modern in Literature

- Khushwant Singh recounts his experiences being amongst the first batch of Modernites in his autobiography Truth, Love and a Little Malice. He also recollects many a school tale in Notes on the Great Indian Circus.
- In Chetan Bhagat's, Half Girlfriend, the female protagonist, Riya Somani, is a Modernite.
A panoramic view of the main building

== Notable people ==
=== Alumni ===
Pupils of Modern School have gone on to achieve prominence in politics, government service, the armed forces of India, commerce, journalism, literature, academia, and the fine and performing arts. They include a prime minister, several Cabinet and Chief Ministers, numerous members of the Indian Parliament and State Legislative Assemblies, high-ranking military officials, of which include two Chiefs of Air Staff, and several ambassadors. The best-known alumna is Indira Gandhi. In fact, Modern School has educated several members of the Nehru-Gandhi family. Rahul Gandhi and Priyanka Gandhi, children of former Prime Minister Rajiv Gandhi and Indian National Congress President Sonia Gandhi, attended Raghubir Singh Junior Modern School before enrolling in St. Columba's School and Convent of Jesus and Mary respectively. Similarly, cousin Varun Gandhi, son of Sanjay Gandhi and Maneka Anand Gandhi, completed his primary schooling here.

Notable Modern School alumni have held senior positions in Indian politics, bureaucracy, and judiciary, these include Sanjay Kishan Kaul, former Chief Justice of the Madras High Court, Madan Lokur, Supreme Court Judge, Mukul Rohatgi, former Attorney General of India, Gopal Krishna Gandhi, Governor of West Bengal and Bihar, Kamlesh Sharma, Indian High Commissioner to the United Kingdom, and Amitabh Kant, chairman of the Delhi-Mumbai Industrial Corridor project. In the defence services, Modern Alumni include S.K. Mehra and P.C. Lal, both former Air Chief Marshals of the Indian Air Force. In the field of journalism and literature, Modern boasts stalwart Khushwant Singh as alumni. Arun Shourie, former Cabinet Minister, former Member of Rajya Sabha, former editor of The Indian Express, Barkha Dutt and Raghav Chadha, of the Aam Aadmi Party, are also Modern alumni.

Modern alumni have also made a mark in sports and entertainment. Golfers Daniel Chopra, Shiv Kapur, and Gaurav Ghei, cricketers Kirti Azad, Unmukt Chand, and Gautam Gambhir, tennis players Vishal Uppal and Karan Salwan, shooter Samresh Jung, and chess grandmaster Tania Sachdev are all ex-Modernites. In the arena of fine and performing arts, Modern alumni include Yamini Reddy, Kuchipudi dancer, Abhay Sapori, Santoor maestro and music composer, film actress Amrita Singh, Amjad Ali Khan and his sons Ayaan and Amaan Ali Khan, Sarod exponents and music composers, Geeta Kapur, art historian, art critic and daughter of former principal, Mr. M.N. Kapur, actors Sanjana Sanghi, Mallika Dua, Amrita Singh, Priyamvada Kant, Arjit taneja, Karan Soni, and Alok Nath, filmmaker Shekhar Kapur, conservationist and wildlife photographer Aditya Dicky Singh, and beauty pageant winner Ekta Choudhry.

Naresh Trehan, surgeon and chairman of Medanta, Noshir Minoo Shroff, eye surgeon, Aditi Shankardass, Neuroscientist, and Arvinder Singh Soin, liver transplant surgeon, represent Modern School alumni in the life and medical sciences. In business, Rajat Gupta, former managing director of McKinsey and Company and one of the founders of the Indian School of Business, Gurcharan Das, former CEO of Procter & Gamble, and Surinder Mehta, founder of Prime Group and a Padma Shri awardee are Modern School alumni.

=== Faculty ===
- Sarada Ukil, artist, actor, and art teacher at Modern School, Barakhamba Road
- Ramkinkar Baij, widely known as one of the pioneers of modern Indian sculpture taught at the school
- Sukumar Bose, noted artist following in the tradition of the Bengal School of Art, taught art at the school through 1947

== Modern School Old Students' Association ==
Modern School Old Students Association (MSOSA) brings together alumni. With over 15000 members, MSOSA has engaged in cultural and sporting activities to raise funds for supporting philanthropic activities, contributing to national causes including Kargil war relief in 1999, Gujarat earthquake relief in 2001, and tsunami relief in 2004. The Modernites Trust, MSOSA's philanthropic arm, provides merit scholarships to under-privileged students.

== See also ==
- The Doon School
- St. Xavier's Collegiate School
- The Mother's International School
- Manav Sthali School
- List of schools in Delhi
