= Anu Malhotra =

Indian filmmaker

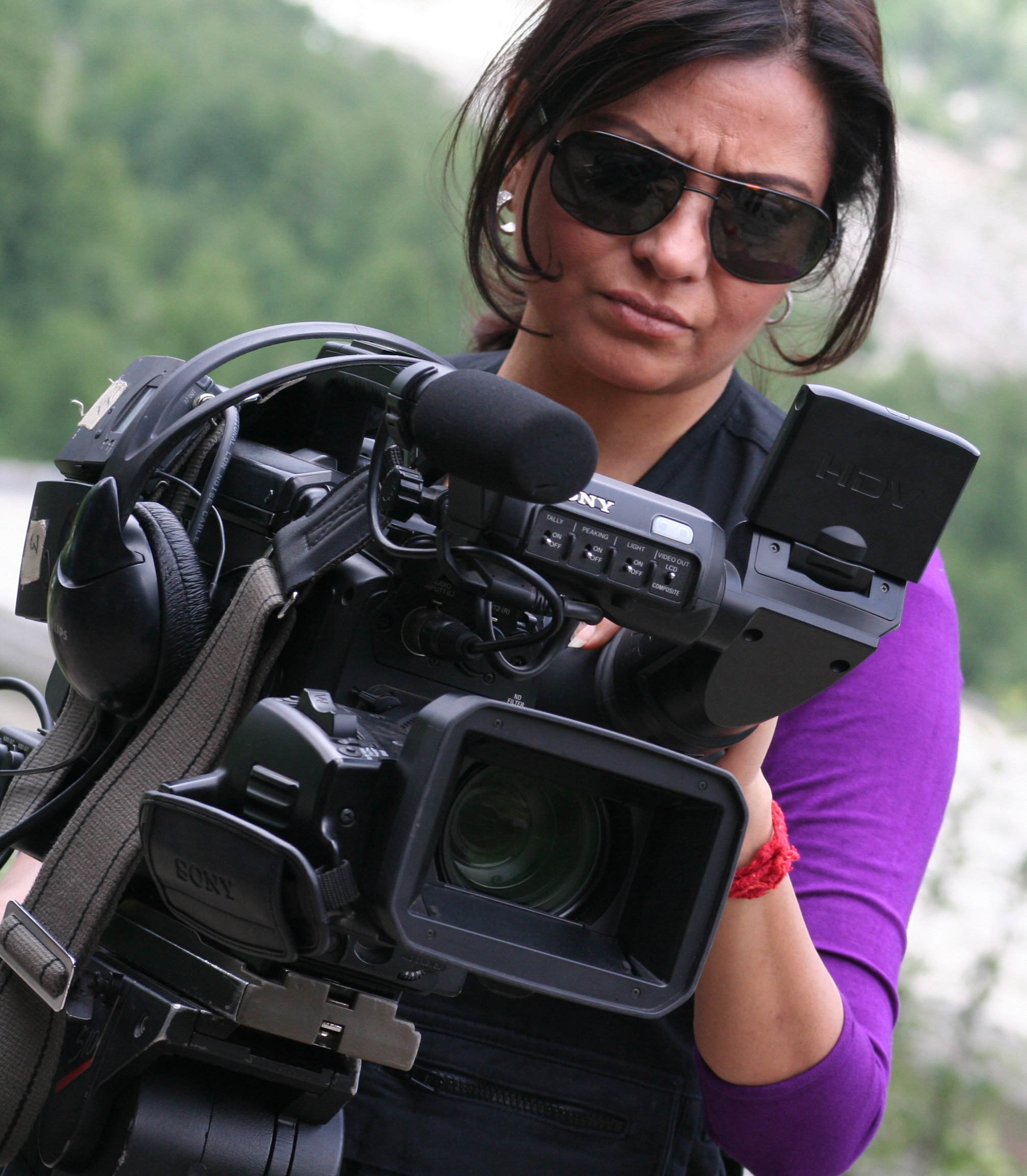
- Anu Malhotra during the making of Shamans of the Himalayas; Self-portrait photograph
- Born: Anu; 26 March 1961 (age 65); New Delhi, Delhi, India
- Occupations: Film Director, Presenter, Screenwriter
- Years active: 1995–present
- Spouse: Iqbal Malhotra

Anu Malhotra is an Indian filmmaker on the subject of travel and expedition. She has written, directed, and hosted many television series, programs, films, and advertisement films for the Department of Tourism in India. She has led the Incredible India campaign for filming and cinematographic presentation. Documentaries that showcase the cultures and traditions of India such as the Apatani of Arunachal Pradesh, the Konyak of Nagaland, and "The Maharaja of Jodhpur–Legacy lives on" have been created by her. Her latest production which premiered in October 2010, is on shamanism in Himachal Pradesh, entitled "Shamans of the Himalayas".

== Awards and recognition ==
- Best Tourism Promotional, Department of Tourism, 2002.
- Best National Tourism Film by the Ministry of Tourism, 2001
- Udyog Rattan Award for 2001.
- Best National Tourism Film by the Ministry of Tourism, 2000.
- Premio Televisino Internationazionle Award (Italy), 1999.
- Travel and Tourism Promoter's Award, 1998.
- Best National Tourism Film by the Ministry of Tourism, 1997.
- Best National Tourism Film, by the Ministry of Tourism, 1996.
- Onida Pinnacle Award in Best Director in non-fiction, 1995.
- Onida Pinnacle Award for Best coverage of a live event, 1995.
- Lions Club, Bombay Award for Best Travelogue on Television, 1995.

== Filmography ==
Year	Film	Director	Producer	Story	Concept	Presenter	Notes
1994	Namaste India (TV series)	Yes		Yes	Yes		Won — Best National Tourism Film by the Ministry of Tourism, 1997; Won —Best National Tourism Film by the Ministry of Tourism, 1996; Won —Onida Pinnacle Award in "Best Director in Non-Fiction", 1995; Won —Lions Club, Bombay Award for the 'Best Travelogue on Television', 1995
1995	People's Club (TV Series)	Yes			Yes		
1996	Dum Dum Diga Diga (TV Series)	Yes			Yes		
1996	Lakme Fashion Catalogue	Yes				Yes	
1997	Indian Holiday	Yes		Yes	Yes	Yes	Won — Best National Tourism Film by the Ministry of Tourism, 1997; Won — Best National Tourism Film by the Ministry of Tourism, 1998; Won — Travel and Tourism Promoters Award, 1998
1997	Jhatpat Khana	Yes		Yes	Yes	Yes	
1999	India Magic	Yes			Yes	Yes	Won — Best National Tourism Film by the Ministry of Tourism, 2000
1999	Khubsoorat (TV Series)	Yes			Yes	Yes	
2000	Holistic Healing	Yes			Yes		
2000	Rajasthan – A Colourful Legacy				Yes		Telecast on Discovery Channel, Prime TV (New Zealand), RAI (Italy), Spektrum TV (Hungary), Ceska TV (Czech Rep), Travel Channel (UK), AIR India (2000–2006)
2001	The Konyak of Nagaland	Yes		Yes	Yes		Screened at GOA Spiritual Film Festival in 2005, CMS Vatavaran Film Festival 2005; Telecast on Discovery Channel (2002–2007); Won - CMS Vatavaran Film Festival Award, 2005
2001	The Aptani of Arunachal Pradesh	Yes		Yes	Yes		Screened at GOA Spiritual Film Festival in 2005, CMS Vatavaran Film Festival 2005; Telecast on Discovery Channel (2002–2007); Won - CMS Vatavaran Film Festival Award, 2005
2002	The Road to Nirvana	Yes					Won — Best TV Documentary of the year on Indian Television, at the Indian Telly Awards, 2004; Telecast on Discovery Channel (2003–2008); Worked as the Co-director
2004	The Maharaja of Jodhpur – The Legacy Lives on...	Yes		Yes	Yes		Won — Best Documentary Music, Indian Telly Awards 2006; Won — Best Best Documentary Cinematography, IDPA 2005; Nominated — Best Documentary, ARPA Festival, Los Angeles (2004); Nominated — Best Foreign Film, San Fernando Valley International Film Festival (2005); Telecast on Discovery Channel (2004–2009)
2010	Shamans of the Himalayas	Yes		Yes	Yes		Telecasted on Discovery Channel, India (2013)

Anu has also worked on several other documentaries and films a collection of which named 'Tribal Wisdom' was telecasted on Discovery Channel International, France 5, Al Jazeera, Twin Rambler and Tung Hoa during the years 2002–2009. This series was all about the tradition, customs and life of tribes in India, in this there were different films put together to present as a series namely The Rabaris of Gujarat, The Irulas of Tamil Nadu, The Khasis of Meghalaya, The Nicobarese of Car Nicobar, The Baigas of Madhya Pradesh, as well as The Apatani of Arunachal Pradesh and The Konyak of Nagaland.
