= Udyog Rattan Award =

Award for economic development in India

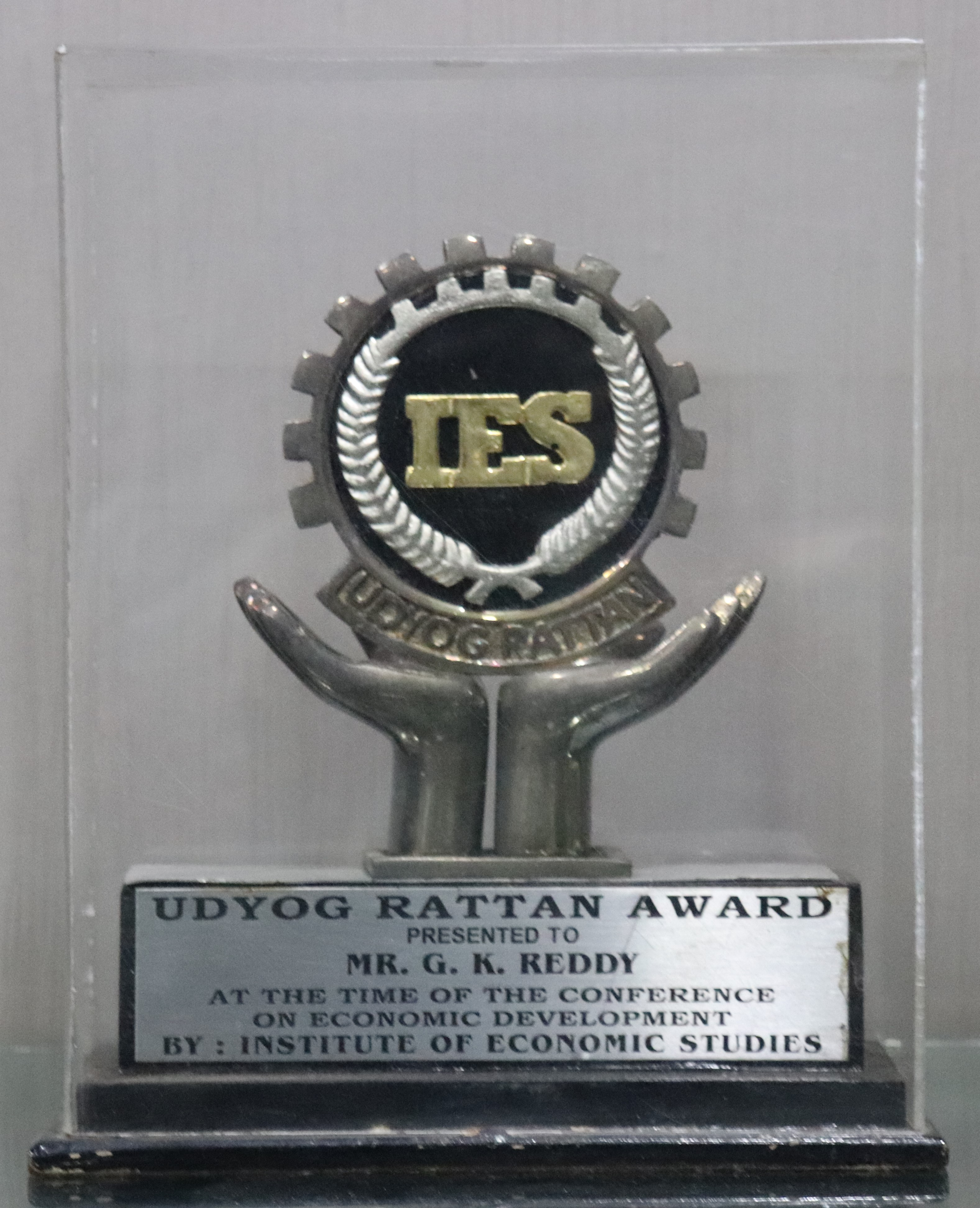
Udyog Rattan Award given to G.K. Reddy

The Udyog Ratna Award (translated as Jewel of the Industry Award) is conferred annually to Indian citizens, for their outstanding contribution to the economic development of the country. The award is conferred by the Institute of Economic Studies, India (IES), affiliated with the government of India and the selection is done by a panel of judges who are usually eminent citizens with economic backgrounds. Nominations are made by the existing members, and absolute care is taken that there is no bias or favoritism. Normally there are hundreds of nominees and it takes several weeks or sometimes months of scrutiny to short-list and finalize the recipients.

== Winners ==
- Motilal Oswal
- Dhananjay Datar
- Kailash Das
- Narendra Bansal
- N. Jehangir
- Ajit Narain Haksar
- Surinder Mehta
- Om Prakash Munjal
- Viresh Oberoi
- Mahendra Nanjundaswamy
- Shaurya Doval
- Rakesh Bakshi
- Hariharan Chandrashekar
- Omkar Shinde
- Jayantilal L Mistry (LMP)
