= Aditya Dicky Singh =

Indian conservationist and photographer (1966–2023)

Aditya 'Dicky' Singh
- Born: May 1966
- Died: 6 September 2023 (aged 57)
- Occupations: Conservationist, photographer
- Spouse: Poonam Singh
- Children: 1

Aditya 'Dicky' Singh (May 1966 – 6 September 2023) was an Indian wildlife conservationist and wildlife photographer.

== Career ==
Singh was educated at the Modern School, Barakhamba in New Delhi.

Singh had a bachelor's degree in civil engineering from Bangalore. He was an IAS officer. He joined and then left the Indian Civil Service to pursue his interests in wildlife conservation and wildlife photography.

Singh was famous for his project on the edge of Ranthambore National Park in Rajasthan, India in which he converted 40 acres of land on the edge of Ranthambore into a wild area over decades from 1998 onwards.

Initially, Singh and his wife leased government property in Khilchipur which they transformed into a resort that started operations in 1998. Eventually, they closed down their resort and had a six-room luxury homestay in their own house.

Singh was either a field assistant or a line producer for many wildlife documentaries for the BBC's Wildlife Division, National Geographic Film and Television, Japan's NHK Broadcasting Service, Irish television, and others.

Singh bought a patch of land near Ranthambore Fort in 2000. Eventually, he had accumulated 50 acres of land and he decided to reforest the area. They kept buying patches of adjacent land which they fenced off and left unattended. It took a decade for trees to grow back on their land.

Singh was involved in tiger conservation projects and also played a key role in the setting up, planning and execution of an anti-poaching initiative called 'Operation Co-Operation' which was a joint effort between the local Forest Department and the Ranthambhore National Park, and which led to the identification and capture of tiger poachers.

Singh was the author of the book "Noor: Queen of Ranthambore" about the tigress Noor.

== Personal life and death ==
Dicky Singh was married to Poonam, and had a daughter named Nyra.

Singh died of a heart attack in his sleep on 6 September 2023, at the age of 57.

Valmik Thapar described Singh as one of the finest wildlife photographers.

== Awards ==
Singh won the Carl Zeiss Award for Conservation in 2012 and the Sanctuary Wildlife Photographer of the Year award in 2011.
