= Ratish Nanda =

- Born: 23 August 1973 (age 53); Delhi, India
- Occupations: conservation architect, Projects Director Aga Khan Trust for Culture, India
- Known for: Conservation of Humayun's Tomb (1999–2013)

Ratish Nanda (born 23 August 1973) is a noted Indian conservation architect, who is the Projects Director of Aga Khan Trust for Culture, India.

He presently heads a multi-disciplinary team implementing the Nizamuddin Urban Renewal Initiative in Delhi – a project with distinct conservation, environmental development and socio-development components and the conservation initiative in the Quli Qutb Shah Heritage Park in Hyderabad.

He headed the team that oversaw the garden restoration work at Humayun's Tomb in Delhi completed in March 2003. This was also the first privately funded restoration of a World Heritage Site in India, undertaken by the Aga Khan Trust for Culture (AKTC) and the Archaeological Survey of India (ASI), under the National Culture Fund.

In 2007, Nanda was awarded the Eisenhower Fellowship.

== Early life and background ==
Nanda was born and brought up in Delhi, where he studied at Modern School and subsequently did his BA from the TVB School of Habitat Studies, Delhi. His thesis for the course was on the renewal of historic urban villages in Delhi, and drew upon the work of Patrick Geddes (1854–1932), Scottish architect and urban planner who also spent time in India. This earned Nanda a Gold Medal at the institution in 1995. This was followed by an MA in Conservation Studies from the University of York in 1998. Ratish Nanda married journalist Mandira Nayar, granddaughter of Kuldip Nayar, in 2004

== Career ==
He started his career in 1992, working as a research assistant to Shakeel Hossain for his research on Ritual Architecture and Urbanity of Muharram in India. From 1995 onwards, he compiled the list of heritage buildings of Delhi published by INTACH in two volumes titled Delhi, the Built Heritage. The volumes were released by the Prime Minister of India.

He completed an MA is Historic Building Conservation from the Institute of Advanced Architectural Studies at the University of York in 1998 following which he worked with Edinburgh architect Benjamin Tindall, and then with Historic Scotland, an agency of the Scottish Government based in Edinburgh. After working there for a year, he returned to India and joined Aga Khan Trust for Culture in 1999. With AKTC, he started with the restoration of the gardens around the 16th-century Humayun's Tomb of Mughal Emperor, Humayun, (1999–2003) followed by restoration work at Bagh-e Babur, the garden around the tomb of Babur, the 15th-century founder of Mughal Empire in Kabul, Afghanistan (2003–06).

In 2007, the restoration work at Humayun's Tomb was also started, partly funded by Sir Dorabji Tata Trust, in partnership with the Archaeological Survey of India (ASI). Along with it an Urban Renewal project of surrounding 300 acres area was also started, this included Nizamuddin Basti and Chausath Khamba complex which included Mazar-e-Ghalib, the tomb complex of poet Mirza Ghalib in Nizamuddin Basti.

Ongoing projects with AKTC include the landscaping of Sunder Nursery area spread over a 40-hectare (100-acre), close to Humayun's Tomb, and 16th-century Qutb Shahi Tombs near Golkonda Fort in Hyderabad, India. In 2011, he co-authored, Delhi: Red Fort to Raisina published by Roli Books, a book about over 600 years of architectural heritage of Delhi, with Salman Khurshid and Malvika Singh.

He has been associated with INTACH, Delhi Chapter and member of the Delhi Urban Arts Commission (DUAC) (2008–11). He was awarded the Eisenhower Fellowship in 2007.

== Bibliography ==
- Narayani Gupta; O. P. Jain; Ratish Nanda (1999). Delhi, the built heritage: a listing. INTACH, Delhi Chapter. ISBN 978-81-900281-9-6.
- Ingval Maxwell; Ratish Nanda; Dennis Urquhart (2001). Conservation of Historic Graveyards. Historic Scotland. ISBN 978-1-900168-74-8.
- Ratish Nanda (2005). The Central Axis Reconstruction: Baghe Babur, Kabul, Afghanistan. Aga Khan Trust for Culture.
- Salman Khurshid; Ratish Nanda; Malvika Singh (2012). Delhi: Red Fort to Raisina. Roli Books. ISBN 978-81-7436-861-4.
