= Shaurya Doval =

Indian politician and Investment Banker

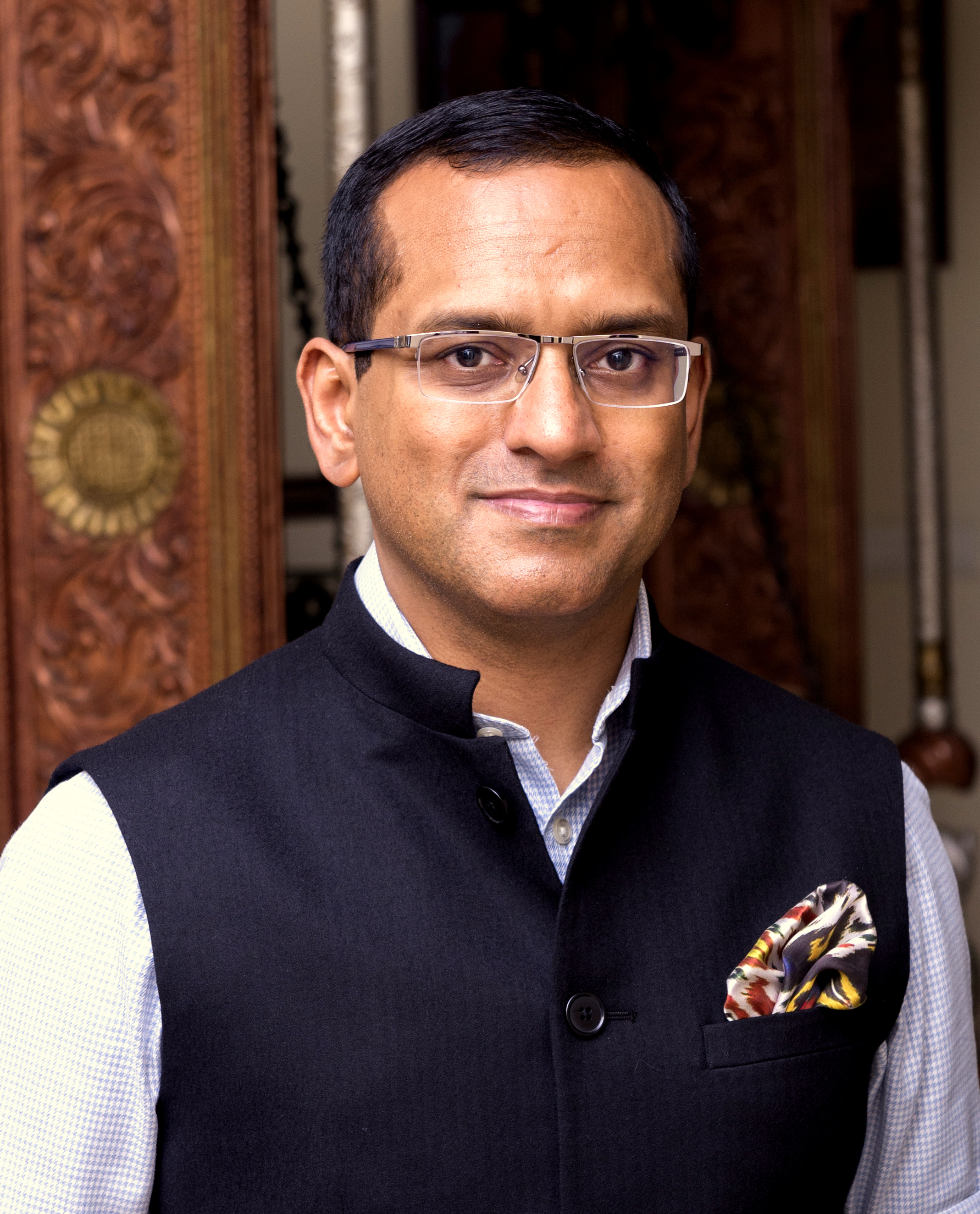
- Doval in 2018

Personal details
- Party: Bharatiya Janata Party
- Spouse: Divya Doval
- Children: 2
- Parent(s): Ajit Doval (father); Aruni Doval (mother)
- Education: (B.A. Economics) Hindu College, Delhi; Delhi University (M.A. Economics) Annamalai University (MBA) University of Chicago (MBA) London Business School
- Awards: Udyog Rattan Award

Shaurya Doval is an Indian politician and investment banker who is member of the Bharatiya Janata Party and is the Executive Member of BJP Uttarakhand. He is the founder and leader of India Foundation, a right-wing think tank that is closely associated with the Narendra Modi Government. He has worked as investment banker for GE Capital and Morgan Stanley and heads Torch Investment (previously known as Zeus Caps). He is the eldest son of Ajit Doval who is National Security Adviser of India.

Doval and his organisation have attracted scrutiny by left-leaning news portals due to their alleged growing influence, opaque funding and ties to some of India cabinet ministers. Doval filed a criminal defamation case against The Caravan and Congress leader Jairam Ramesh for 'deliberately defaming him "seemingly to settle scores" with his father. In December 2020, Ramesh apologised in court for "any hurt the statements may have caused".

== Early life and education ==
Shaurya is the son of Ajit Doval, India's National Security Advisor. He attended Army Public School. He holds a BA degree in Economics from Hindu College, Delhi of Delhi University with honours.

He also holds two MBA degrees from Booth School of Business, University of Chicago and London Business School. He has a chartered accountancy degree from The Institute of Chartered Accountants of India.

== Career ==
Doval is an investment banker by profession and is the managing director of a Singapore-based wealth management firm, Torch Investment (previously known as Zeus Caps), a company chaired by Saudi Prince Mishaal bin Abdullah Al Saud.

He has over 30 years of international investment banking experience, during which he has worked for over a decade in London in leveraged finance at GE Capital's London office and the investment banking division of Morgan Stanley. He has also worked with corporate finance advisory at Arthur Andersen in India.

He was awarded the Eisenhower Fellowship in 2015 for his work in the field of public policy. He was selected by the Government of Japan for their invitation program for ministers, Strategic Exchange on Practical Level (STEP) for the year 2022-23 where he learnt about the culture, economy and policymaking in Japan.

== Politics ==
In 2014, Doval was a planner for the $1.5m public reception for the newly elected Prime Minister of India Narendra Modi by the Indian American community at Madison Square Garden during his 2014 state visit to the US which was attended by 20,000 people.

He formally joined Bharatiya Janta Party in Uttarakhand as a special invitee in the party's state executive members' meet in 2017. He became the party's convenor for good governance in the state. Political analysts speculated that he might contest the 2019 Indian general election from the Pauri Garhwal seat of Uttarakhand. In April 2019, Z security protection was provided in response to potential security threats against him and his father during the elections.

According to a 2017 report by The Wire, since 2014 Doval's think tank had become the most influential in India. It alleged that he had a conflict of interest as four of the directors of India Foundation were appointed as ministers in 2014 including Defence Minister Nirmala Sitharaman, and they continued to be Directors in India Foundation even after joining the government. It questioned the Foundation's opaque sources of funding. Doval claimed that it raised money through "conferences, advertisement[s], [and] journal[s]" and that "no foreign funding has ever been received", however The Wire noted its conferences were sponsored by international companies such as Boeing and DBS Bank.

In 2019, The Caravan alleged inexplicable ties between the businesses of Doval and his younger brother Vivek who allegedly ran a hedge fund based in the Cayman Islands. This was taken up by Congress leader Jairam Ramesh in a press conference on 17 January 2019.

A subsequent criminal defamation case was filed by Vivek Doval against Ramesh, Caravan magazine and its staff writer who Doval claimed had used "inferences and innuendos" to give the impression that he and his family were involved in money laundering and round tripping. In December 2020, Jairam Ramesh apologised in court for "any hurt the statements may have caused".

== Public work in Uttarakhand ==
Doval conceptualized 'Bemisaal Garhwal' under the banner of 'Buland Uttarakhand' which aims to improve the quality of education and health in Uttarakhand.

== Awards ==
Doval was awarded the Udyog Rattan Award in 2012 for his contribution to the power sector in India. He was also the Eisenhower Fellow from India for 2015. On 13 February 2021, Chandigarh University awarded Doval with its Pride of India award 'for his contribution as think-tank and youth icon for entrepreneurs'. He was also nominated as a fellow of World Academy of Arts and Science in July, 2024.

== See also ==
- Think tank#India
- List of think tanks in India
