= Surinder Mehta =

Indian entrepreneur

- Born: 3 August 1956 (age 69); New Delhi, India
- Occupations: Entrepreneur, business person
- Known for: Founder of Prime Group
- Spouse: Archna Mehta
- Children: 2 (a son and a daughter)
- Awards: Padma Shri (2009)
- Website: Website of Prime Group

Surinder Mehta is an Indian entrepreneur, business person, and the founder of Prime Group, a technology-based conglomerate with a number of subsidiaries which include PCI Limited, Planet PCI Infotech Limited, Prime Electric Limited, Prime Power Corporation Limited and Endolite India Limited.

Reported to be a self-made business person, he founded the group in 1986 with the first company, PCI Limited, and has been heading the Group since then. The Government of India awarded him the fourth highest civilian honour of the Padma Shri, in 2009, for his contributions to Indian industry.

== Early life and education ==
Mehta was born on 3 August 1956 in the Indian capital of New Delhi and did his early education at Modern School, Delhi, before graduating in Commerce with honours from the Shri Ram College of Commerce, Delhi.

== Career ==
At the start of his career, he introduced modern technologies in power distribution sector, such as van-mounted remote fault detection system, which eliminated time-consuming manpower involvement. He is the founder of ISHWAR, a non governmental organization engaged in charitable activities and Endolite India, a chain of centres providing Prosthetic and Orthotic services.

== Personal life ==
He is married to Archna Mehta and the couple has a son, Rohan Mehta, and a daughter, Sneha Mehta.

== Recognition ==
Mehta is recipient of the honours such as PHDCCI Distinguished Entrepreneurship Award, Udyog Rattan Award, Priyadarshini Indira Gandhi Award, Rajiv Gandhi Excellence Award, Rattan Shiromani Award, and National Business Leadership Award. He received the civilian honour of the Padma Shri in 2009.

== See also ==
- Shri Ram College of Commerce
- Modern School (New Delhi)
- List of Modern School alumni
