= Noshir M. Shroff =

Indian ophthalmologist

- Born: 23 August 1951 (age 73); New Delhi, India
- Occupation: Ophthalmologist
- Awards: Padma Bhushan; Dr. Krishna Sohan Singh Trophy; G. K. Panthaki Award; Bharat Jyoti Award; Nargis Adi Gandhi Memorial Award
- Website: Official web site of Shroff Eye Centre

Noshir Minoo Shroff is an Indian ophthalmologist notable for pioneering intraocular lens implantation surgery in India. He was awarded the Padma Bhushan in 2010 by the Indian government for his services to medicine.

== Biography ==
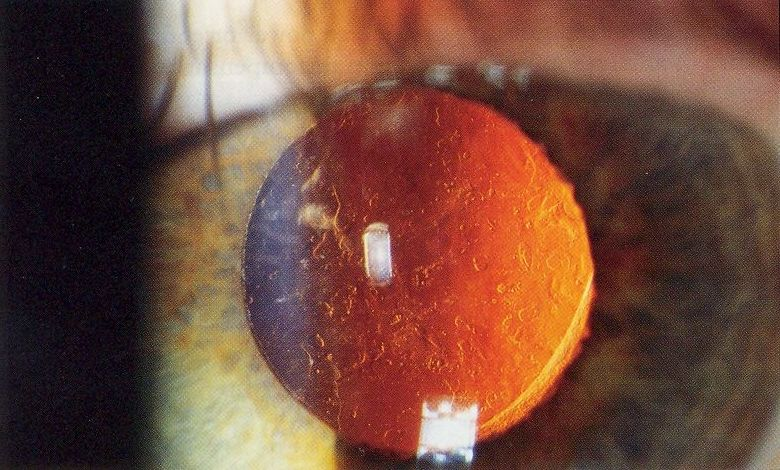
Slit lamp photo of Pseudophakia: Posterior chamber Intraocular lens

Noshir Minoo Shroff was born on 23 August 1951 in New Delhi to Minoo Shroff, an ophthalmologist. He attended the Modern School, New Delhi. His grandfather, S. P. Shroff, was a Fellow of the Royal College of Surgeons of Edinburgh and founded Dr. Shroff's Charity Eye Hospital. Noshir graduated from the Maulana Azad Medical College of the University of Delhi in 1973 with a focus on ophthalmology; and completed his post-graduate studies with a master's degree in Minimal Access Surgery (MMAS) in 1978.

In 1978, Shroff joined the family clinic, Shroff Eye Centre, where he initiated cataract, intraocular lens and refractive surgery.

== Career highlights and legacy ==
Video of a complete LASIK-treatment

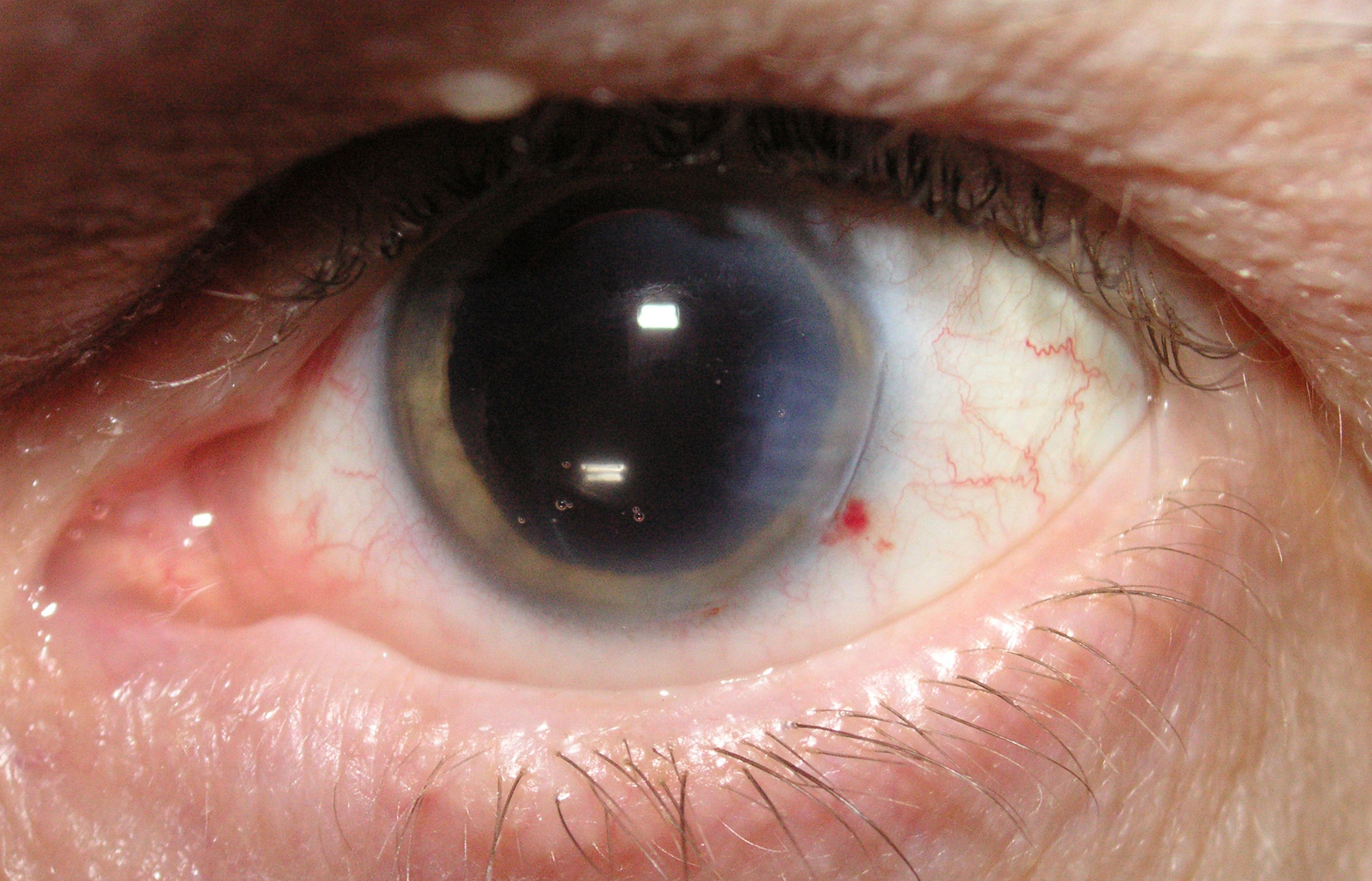
Cataract surgery recently performed, foldable IOL inserted. Note small incision and very slight haemorrhage to the right of the still dilated pupil.

Shroff is a pioneer of Intraocular Lens implantation surgery in India and has performed over 30,000 surgeries. He was also one of the first ophthalmologists in India to launch Phacoemulsification (microincision sutureless cataract surgery), in 1992. He introduced keratorefractive surgery in India, and has carried out over 5000 photorefractive keratectomy, LASIK, LASEK, Epi-LASIK and intralase (bladeless lasik surgery) procedures. Shroff is credited with a number of innovations in cataract surgery such as improved design of instruments, techniques and protocols. A drip controlling device used in Immersion A-scan Biometry is one such device, which helps the surgeon to get more accurate eye measurements for calculating intraocular lens power.

Shroff has opened a training center at Shroff Eye Centre for post graduate degree in ophthalmology. The center has been recognized by the National Board of Examinations.

Shroff Charity Eye Hospital has opened centers at various remote areas in Rajasthan, Haryana and Uttar Pradesh. Shroff is also associated with Project Prakash, an initiative aimed at providing medical assistance to disabled children and understanding learning and plasticity in the brain. The project is conducted in association with Massachusetts Institute of Technology, USA. Shroff has also carried out charitable work with Orbis International, medical centers in Zamrudpur village with the Delhi Commonwealth Women's Association (DCWA), and in Srinivaspuri with Savera India.

== Shroff Eye Centre ==
Cataract in the human eye

Dr. Shroff's Charity Eye Hospital was established in 1914 and made into a full-fledged eye hospital in 1926, by S. P. Shroff, the grandfather of Noshir Shroff. In 1972, Minoo Shroff, expanded the practice with a new clinic in the Surya Kiran building in CP and in Kailash colony in 1973 under the name of Shroff Eye Centre.

Shroff has treated dignitaries such as Dalai Lama and the President of India.

=== Medical positions ===
- Honorary ophthalmologist to the President of India
- Trustee, Senior Consultant and Advisor – Shroff Charity Eye Hospital, New Delhi
- Medical Director – Shroff Eye Centre
- Trainer – Diplomate National Board (DNB) program for training young ophthalmologists
- Patron – R. K. Devi Eye Research Institute, Kanpur

=== Social positions ===
- President – Ophthalmological Society of India, Delhi
- Secretary General – II International Congress of Intraocular Implant Society – New Delhi – 1992
- Member, Executive Committee – Intraocular Lens Implant and Refractive Society – India – 1990–98

== Awards and recognitions ==
- Padma Bhushan – 2010
- Dr. Krishna Sohan Singh Trophy for Best Clinical Talk – 1983–84 – Ophthalmological Society of India, Delhi
- Dr. Krishna Sohan Singh Trophy for Best Clinical Talk – 1986–87 – Ophthalmological Society of India, Delhi
- G. K. Panthaki Award – 1997 – Federation of Parsi Zoroastrian Anjumans of India
- Bharat Jyoti Award and Certificate of Excellence – 2003 – India International Friendship Society
- Nargis Adi Gandhi Memorial Award – Federation of Parsi Zoroastrian Anjumans of India

== Keynote addresses ==
- Dr. P. N. Sinha Oration – 36th annual conference of Bihar Ophthalmological Society of India, Gaya – 28–29 November 1998 on Evolution of Cataract Surgery – The Quest for Excellence
- Oration – Federation of Ophthalmic Research and Education Centre, India Habitat Centre, New Delhi – 19 November 2005 on Advances in Phaco-emulsification
- Dr. C. Shekhar Grover Oration – Uttara Eyecon 2006, Dehradun – 7–8 October 2006 on From Couching to Today's Cataract Refractive Surgery – A Giant Leap
