= Dhananjay Datar =

Indian businessman

Dhananjay Datar is an Indian businessman based in the United Arab Emirates. He moved from Mumbai to Dubai where he joined his father, who had set up a small grocery business where Datar interned before taking over the business and expanding it into the retail, spice production and export company Al Adil Group in 1984, becoming a prominent member of the UAE's Indian expatriate business community.

== 'Masala King' ==
Datar was born in Maharashtra and brought up by his grandmother in the city of Amaravati from the age of 8 as his father was a sergeant in the Indian Air Force (IAF) and travelled constantly. His father retired and the family moved to Mumbai, from where Datar's father then emigrated to Dubai to set up a small grocery business. Joining him, Datar took out a bank loan and expanded the business, naming it Al Adil group. By 2021, the Group had 43 supermarket outlets across the GCC, operating two factories and two spice mills. Datar has frequently been dubbed as the "Masala King" by media in both the UAE and India and in 2017 was ranked 39th among the 50 Richest Indians in the GCC by Arabian Business. In 2018, he was ranked 29th Forbes Middle East's 'Top 100 Indian Business Leaders' and in 2019 was ranked 27th. He was a recipient of the Udyog Rattan Award for outstanding contribution to the economic development of India in 2011.
