= Delhi Medical Council =

Indian medical council and statutory body

- Abbreviation: DMC
- Formation: 1998
- Headquarters: New Delhi
- Leader: Dr. Arun Gupta, President
- Affiliations: Department of Health and Family Welfare (GNCTD)
- Website: Delhi Medical Council

The Delhi Medical Council (DMC) is a State Medical Council and statutory body enacted under the Delhi Medical Council Act 1997 for regulating the practice of the modern system of medicine in Delhi.

== Functions of the council ==
The main functions of the Delhi Medical Council:

- Keeping a directory of all registered medical practitioners in the GNCTD;
- Regulation the professional conduct of medical professionals;
- To act on the complaints of medical negligence of registered medical practitioners in GNCTD; and
- Registration of doctors and their qualifications.

== See also ==
- Medical Council of India
