= Arvinder Singh Soin =

Indian hepatologist

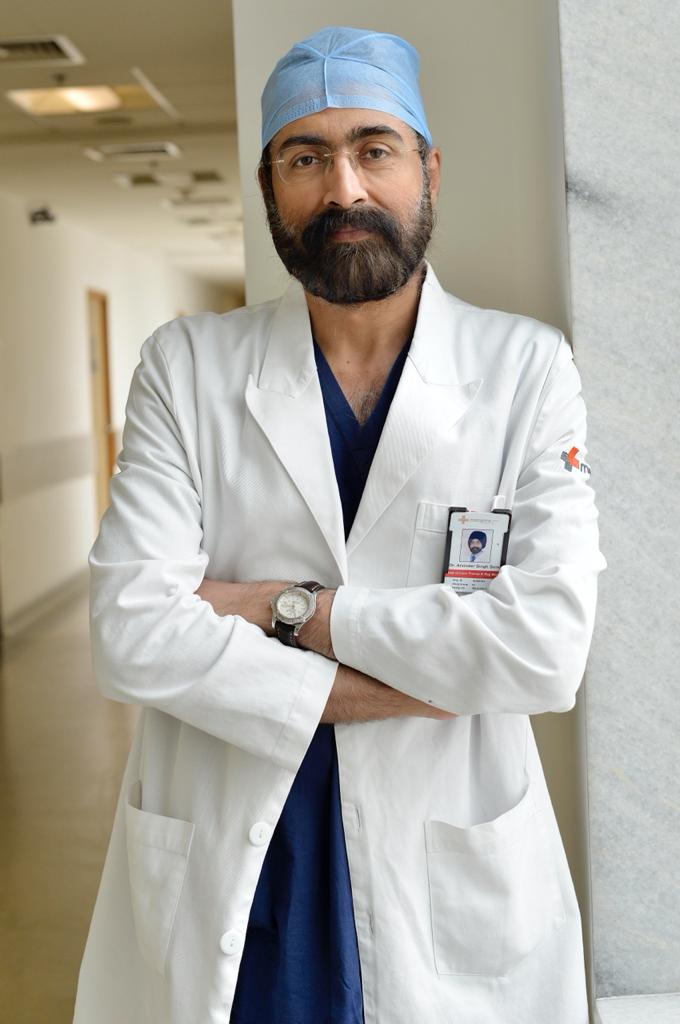
- Soin in 2021
- Education: MBBS (AIIMS), MS (AIIMS), FRCS Cambridge University
- Known for: Living donor liver transplantation (LDLT)
- Medical career
- Profession: Liver Transplant Surgeon
- Institutions: Medanta-The Medicity, Sir Gangaram Hospital
- Sub-specialties: Living donor liver transplantation (LDLT)
- Research: Transplantation
- Awards: Padma Shri (2010)

Arvinder Singh Soin is an Indian surgeon and the Chief Hepatobiliary and Liver Transplant Surgeon & Chairman of the Institute of Liver Transplantation and Regenerative Medicine, Medanta-The Medicity. Known for his work in the field of liver transplantation, Soin also runs the Liver Transplant institute at the Sir H. N. Reliance Foundation Hospital, Mumbai. He has performed more than 3500 living donor liver transplants in India.

== Education ==
Soin attended the All India Institute of Medical Sciences, New Delhi, where he spent 11 years obtaining MBBS and MS degrees. He specialized in liver and gastrointestinal surgery, and obtained FRCS (Fellowship of the Royal Colleges of Surgeons) degrees from both Glasgow and Edinburgh in the UK.

== Honours ==
- Padma Shri in 2010 for pioneering the development in Liver Transplantation in India.
- RD Birla Outstanding Clinician of the Year Award for 2010
