= Dr Lal PathLabs =

Healthcare company private ltd

- Type: Public
- Traded as: BSE: 539524; NSE: LALPATHLAB
- Industry: Healthcare
- Founded: 1949
- Founder: S. K. Lal
- Headquarters: Delhi, India
- Number of locations: 233
- Key people: Arvind Lal (Chairman)
- Brands: Swasthfit, Sugarnme, OncoPro, NephroPro
- Revenue: ▲₹2,227 crore (US$230 million) (FY24)
- Net income: ▲₹362 crore (US$38 million) (FY24)
- Number of employees: 3941 (2019)
- Website: www.lalpathlabs.com

Dr Lal PathLabs Limited is an Indian service provider of diagnostic and related healthcare tests. Based in New Delhi, the company offers tests on blood, urine and other human body viscera.

== History ==
Dr Lal PathLabs was started in 1949, by the late S. K. Lal. Lal was a Junior Doctor in the British Indian Army and studied pathology from the Armed Forces Medical College in Pune, with additional training in pathology at Cook County Hospital in Chicago. The main operation of Dr Lal PathLabs deals with the performing of diagnosis and testing, including routine tests (including blood tests), specialized tests (e.g., viral and bacterial infection tests) and preventive screenings.

In 2014, Dr Lal PathLabs acquired the APL Clinical Institute of Clinical Laboratory & Research Private Limited.

Dr Lal PathLabs launched its IPO in 2015. The company got listed on BSE and NSE on 23 December 2015.

In 2021, Dr Lal PathLabs acquired Suburban Diagnostics for an enterprise value of ₹925 crore in an all-cash deal.

== Operations ==
=== Infrastructure ===
The company has 200 laboratories and diagnostic centres with approximately 5000+ collection centres across India. They have also worked with BD India to open a "Centre of Excellence in Phlebotomy", a centre for training healthcare in the process of safely collecting blood samples.

=== Laboratory Accreditations ===
- ISO 9001:2008 certification from British Standards Institution (BSI)
- National Accreditation Board for Testing and Calibration Laboratories (NABL), Ministry of Science and Technology, Government of India.

== Awards and recognition ==
- The CNBC TV18 Emerging Company of the Year award in 2008
- The Best Diagnostic Service Company in India at VCCircle Healthcare summit 2013.
- Diagnostic Service Provider Company of the Year 2012 by Frost & Sullivan.
- Award for Service Excellence (Diagnostic Centre) for the Year 2018 by Federation of Indian Chambers of Commerce & Industry

== Controversies ==
=== Zika outbreak ===
While Zika has not been reported in India (as of 6 February 2016), on 3 February 2016, Dr Lal PathLabs and other competing pathology labs announced they were preparing Zika test kits. Dr Lal PathLabs reported they plan to sell their kits for Rs 4500 (€60). However, several days later IndiaToday reported: "the Union Ministry of Health pulled up private players, saying they cannot cash in on a public health emergency" and also reported that Dr. Vandana Lal (executive director of Dr Lal PathLabs) stated: "We don't want to talk on this matter. We don't have any tests for Zika virus and we are also not importing any test kits for the same. If at all we plan to do something, we will take the government's prior permission."

=== Data breach ===
According to an October 2020 report, for months, the company stored hundreds of massive spreadsheets containing sensitive patient data in an Amazon Web Services storage bucket without a password. TechCrunch was the first news source to report the data breach.
