= Arvinder Singh Bubber =

Canadian academic administrator

- Education: University of Punjab
- Scientific career
- Fields: Accounting
- Workplaces: Kwantlen Polytechnic University

Arvinder Singh Bubber is the first chancellor of Kwantlen Polytechnic University located in the South Fraser region of British Columbia's Lower Mainland. He was installed as chancellor at Kwantlen's Fall Convocation in October 2008. He is expected to serve a three-year term through 2011.

== Early life ==
Chancellor Bubber earned his undergraduate degree in the faculty of science at the University of Punjab. He received his chartered accountant designation after moving to England in 1971. He then moved to Canada in 1976.
