= Arvind Lal =

Indian pathologist and medical administrator

Brig. Dr. Arvind Lal
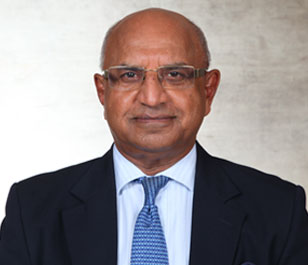
- Born: 22 August 1949 (age 77); Pune, Maharashtra, India
- Occupations: Pathologist, Medical administrator
- Known for: Medical diagnostics
- Spouse: Dr. Vandana Lal
- Parent: Dr. S. K. Lal
- Awards: Padma Shri; Healthcare Lifetime Achievement Award; Indira Gandhi Solidarity Award; Eminent Medical Person award Delhi Ratan Award; International Business Council Award
- Website: Website of Dr Lal Pathlabs

Brigadier Arvind Lal is an Indian billionaire, pathologist, medical administrator and the chairman and managing director of Dr Lal PathLabs, a medical diagnostic centre in Delhi. A medical graduate and a medical academic, he is reported to have modernized Indian medical diagnostics and initiated the first Public Private Partnership (PPP) in the field of laboratory testing in India. He holds the rank of a Brigadier in the Indian Armed Forces, an honorary rank conferred by the Army. The Government of India awarded him the fourth highest civilian honour of the Padma Shri, in 2009, for his contributions to Medicine.

== Early life ==
Arvind Lal, born on 22 August 1949, graduated in medicine from the Armed Forces Medical College, Pune, secured his post graduate degree from the same institution and started his career there as a lecturer at the Department of Pathology.

== Taking charge of Dr Lal PathLabs ==
In 1977, he went back to his family business by taking charge of Dr Lal PathLabs, a laboratory services providing institution founded by his father, S. K. Lal, in 1949. Under his leadership, the institution modernized its diagnostic services by incorporating Information and communications technology (ICT) systems and branched out to many parts of the country, presently having over 150 laboratories. Affiliated to the College of American Pathologists (CAP), the institution is known to cater to 9000 patients a day, reported to be highest number of tests conducted by a pathology laboratory in India. The annual turn over stood at ₹ 5.5 billion as of March 2014 and the company floated its first IPO in 2014. The honorary physician to the President of India in 2001, he was one of the founders of the Indian chapter of the Association of Clinical Research Organizations (ACRO) where he served as the first vice president. He is known to have initiated the first Public Private Partnership (PPP) in the country in laboratory testing in 2004 when Dr Lal PathLabs took up a project in association with the Government of Tripura, an effort which was repeated with the Government of Gujarat during 2011–2013 for testing over 30,000 new born babies in the state.

Arvind Lal is the Secretary of the Healthcare Federation of India (NATHEALTH) and a non-executive Director at the Centre For Sight, New Delhi. He sits in the Board of Directors of APL Institute of Clinical Laboratory and Research, Archana Pharmaceuticals, Doon MRI, Kalmatia Sangam Travels, Paliwal Diagnostics and Paliwal Medicare.

== Honours and awards ==
A recipient of special honour from the World Health Organization, he received the International Business Council Award in 1994 and the Indira Gandhi Solidarity Award in 1995. This was followed by Healthcare Lifetime Achievement Award in 2003 and the Delhi Rattan Award from the Government of Delhi in 2005. The Government of India awarded him the civilian honour of the Padma Shri in 2009. The same year, The Armed Forces of India honoured him with the honorary rank of a Brigadier, making him the first civilian doctor to receive the honour. He is also a recipient of the Eminent Medical Person Award.

== See also ==
- Dr Lal PathLabs
