= Military College of Materials Management =

Training institute in Madhya Pradesh, India

Military College of Materials Management, Jabalpur
- Motto: Strength through Knowledge
- Type: Military Academy
- Established: 1 October 1925; 100 years ago
- Commandant: Lt. Gen. Sanjay Sethi
- Location: Jabalpur, Madhya Pradesh, India; 23.1499°N 79.9856°E
- Campus: 1,007 acres (408 ha)

The Military College of Materials Management (MCMM), located in Jabalpur, is a premier training institute under the Army Ordnance Corps of the Indian Army. The college specializes in various logistics courses, including basic ordnance management, advanced material management, higher munition courses, and quartermaster courses designed for officers, Junior Commissioned Officers (JCOs), and Non-Commissioned Officers (NCOs). Additionally, MCMM provides training for technical clerks and store keeper technical personnel within the Indian Army.

MCMM operates as an autonomous college affiliated with Rani Durgavati Vishwa Vidyalaya (RDVV). The institute also extends its training programs to officers from allied foreign nations. The college is headed by the Commandant, a three-star officer in the Indian Army. The current Commandant is Lieutenant General Sanjay Sethi, AVSM, VSM.

== History ==
The ridge, now known as Sita Pahari was government land reserved for forest and grazing. It was adjunct to ‘Chitapaar’ a revenue village of the Jabalpur district in then central provinces of India. In 1899, the Jabalpur Brigade established temporary accommodations on the ridge. Permanent buildings were constructed between 1907 and 1910, and the ridge was fully occupied by 1915.Following the outbreak of World War I, the ridge remained vacant until March 1916, when the 2/7 Hampshire Regiment occupied the barracks. In 1925, the 2/7 Hampshire Regiment was relieved by the 1st Hampshire Regiment, which continued to reside there until 1943

The Military College of Materials Management (MCMM) was established on 1 October 1925 as the Indian Army Ordnance Corps (IAOC) School of Instructions at Kirkee. It moved to Jabalpur on 13 February 1939, initially located at Roberts Barracks, and relocated to Sita Pahari in 1948. In 1950, the school was renamed the AOC School, and on 8 April 1987, it became the College of Materials Management (CMM). Affiliated with Rani Durgavati Vishwa Vidyalaya (RDVV) in 1991, CMM was granted autonomous status on 1 July 1991. The college was a runner-up for the Golden Peacock National Award for excellence in training in 2000. It received unit citations on Republic Day 2017 and Army Day 2023. On 30 August 2023, CMM was renamed the Military College of Materials Management (MCMM)

== Faculty ==
The Military College of Materials Management (MCMM) provides comprehensive training in Ordnance logistics through several specialized faculties:

=== Faculty of Higher Ordnance Management (FOHOM) ===
The Faculty of Higher Ordnance Management, formerly known as the Staff Officers Wing, was renamed in 1987 when the Army Ordnance Corps (AOC) School transitioned to the College of Materials Management (CMM). As the senior-most faculty at MCMM, FOHOM is responsible for publishing the "Materials Manager," the professional journal of the AOC.

=== Faculty of Munitions (FOM) ===
The Faculty of Munitions offers basic, advanced, and higher training in armament and ammunitions technology. This includes the handling of Improvised Explosive Devices (IEDs) and the management of ammunition warehousing.

=== Faculty of Logistics Support (FOLS) ===
The Faculty of Logistics Support trains Officers, Junior Commissioned Officers (JCOs), Other Ranks, and civilian employees of the Army Ordnance Corps in materials management and effective ordnance support. It also provides training to all branches of the army to effectively perform Quarter Master duties within their respective units.

=== Faculty of Combat Equipment (FOCE) ===
The Faculty of Combat Equipment trains Officers and Other Ranks of the Army Ordnance Corps, other branches of the army, and civilian storekeepers of the AOC in inventory management for combat equipment. This ensures effective combat ordnance logistics support to the Indian Army during both peace and wartime.

=== Faculty of Computer Technology (FOCT) ===
The Faculty of Computer Technology provides training in basic networking, customized software, and Enterprise Resource Planning (ERP) solutions to Officers, Junior Commissioned Officers, Other Ranks, and civilian employees of the Army Ordnance Corps.

=== Recruit Training Wing (RTW) ===
The Recruit Training Wing is responsible for providing basic technical training certification to recruits and civilians of the Army Ordnance Corps, as well as recruits from other branches of the Indian Army. These faculties collectively ensure that personnel of the Army Ordnance Corps and other branches of the Indian Army receive comprehensive training in ordnance logistics, materials management, and related technologies.

== The Faculty of Management Studies (FOMS) ==
The Faculty of Management Studies (FOMS), established in 1995, was the youngest faculty of MCMM. Over time, FOMS developed into a recognized entity in the field of management studies. In 2004, it was separated from MCMM and reestablished at Greater Noida as the Army Institute of Management and Technology (AIMT) under the aegis of the Army Welfare Education Society (AWES). AIMT is now a well-regarded business institute in India.

== Course ==
- AOC Specific
  - Basic Ordnance Management (BOM)
  - Advance Materials Management (AMM)
  - Senior Management Ordnance Course (SMOC)
  - Ordnance Officers Information Technology (OOIT)
  - Higher Munitions (HM)
  - Higher Ordnance Management (HOM)
- All Arms and services
  - Quarter Master Course (QM)
  - Administration and Logistics Management Course (ALMC)
- PMF and State Police
  - State Police Improvised Explosive Devices (IED) Course

== List of Commandants ==
The Commandant of Military College of Materials Management is the overall in-charge of all the functioning of Military College of Materials Management, Jabalpur. The Commandant of the college is a three-star rank officer (Lieutenant General) from the Indian Army.

List of Commandants
S. No	Name	Appointment Date	Left office
1	Col WT Wilson	01-Jun-47	05-Dec-47
2	Col TSA Dega	06-Dec-47	05-Jan-48
3	Col JH Blyth	06-Jan-48	13-Aug-48
4	Col TSA Dega	14-Aug-48	12-Jul-49
5	Col Rajinder Singh	13-Jul-49	07-Jul-54
6	Col Mukhtar Singh	08-Jul-54	16-Aug-57
7	Col SN Mubayi	17-Aug-57	06-Aug-60
8	Col RC Lal	01-Sep-60	16-Apr-61
9	Col N Sen	31-Oct-61	18-Dec-63
10	Col LFA King	21-Dec-63	22-Jan-66
11	Col IPS Sethi	12-Mar-66	11-Jul-68
12	Brig HL Khurana	12-Jul-68	28-Jul-71
13	Brig RP Tugnait	29-Jul-71	09-Feb-73
14	Col PL Chatterjee, AVSM	10-Feb-73	06-Mar-73
15	Brig PL Chatterjee, AVSM	14-Jan-74	14-Jul-74
16	Brig AR Jain	08-Aug-74	30-Apr-76
17	Brig IPS Brar, AVSM	01-May-76	19-Aug-78
18	Brig Ranjit Singh Herr	20-Aug-78	21-Dec-80
19	Maj Gen HM Thakur	22-Dec-80	31-May-83
20	Maj Gen AM Nandkeolyar, AVSM	04-Jun-83	10-Jul-85
21	Lt Gen ML Yadava	11-Jul-85	01-Jun-86
22	Maj Gen Gurbakhash Singh, AVSM	02-Jun-86	30-Sep-86
23	Lt Gen Virender Partap, AVSM, ADC	16-Dec-86	18-Dec-87
24	Maj Gen S Mohindra	19-Dec-87	15-Feb-88
25	Maj Gen SK Kar, VSM	16-Feb-88	31-Mar-89
26	Lt Gen RP Agrawal, PVSM, VSM	01-Apr-89	10-Nov-89
27	Lt Gen DV Kalra, PVSM, AVSM	17-Nov-89	24-Feb-92
28	Maj Gen SC Chatrath, VSM	25-Feb-92	28-Feb-93
29	Maj Gen AC Sharma, AVSM, VSM	10-Mar-93	30-Nov-93
30	Lt Gen Prem Sagar	01-Dec-93	31-Jul-94
31	Maj Gen AC Sharma, AVSM, VSM	01-Aug-94	30-Apr-96
32	Maj Gen YS Teja, VSM	30-Apr-96	04-Dec-97
33	Lt Gen Vijay Lall, PVSM, AVSM, ADC	05-Dec-97	21-Dec-00
34	Lt Gen TJS Gill, PVSM	22-Dec-00	25-Jan-02
35	Lt Gen RS Sherawat, PVSM, AVSM, VSM	26-Jan-02	24-Jun-03
36	Maj Gen MS Ahluwalia	25-Jun-03	30-Oct-03
37	Lt Gen TA D’Cunha, PVSM, ADC	01-Nov-03	31-Aug-04
38	Maj Gen RD Singh	18-Sep-04	06-Sep-05
39	Lt Gen (Dr) DDS Sandhu, PVSM, ADC	06-Sep-05	29-Jun-06
40	Lt Gen BS Sisodia, AVSM, VSM	19-Oct-06	31-Dec-07
41	Maj Gen Anil Sarup	13-Apr-08	31-Jul-09
42	Maj Gen Narendra Dogra	01-Aug-09	06-Mar-10
43	Maj Gen Ajay Seth	07-Mar-10	12-Jul-11
44	Lt Gen Gautam Moorthy, PVSM, AVSM, VSM, ADC	13-Jul-11	31-Jul-12
45	Lt Gen AS Rawat	01-Sep-12	30-Sep-15
46	Maj Gen RS Rathore	01-Oct-15	26-Jan-16
47	Lt Gen NK Mehta, VSM	27-Jan-16	20-May-18
48	Lt Gen Dalip Singh, PVSM, VSM	01-Jun-18	19-Jan-19
49	Lt Gen RKS Kushwaha, AVSM	01-Feb-19	19-Sep-20
50	Lt Gen Rakesh Kapoor, VSM	01-Oct-20	31-Aug-23
51	Lt Gen Sanjay Sethi, AVSM, VSM	01-Sep-23	Till Date

== List of Deputy Commandants & Chief Instructor ==
The Deputy Commandant & Chief Instructor of Military College of materials Management is second in hierarchy after Commandant, who is overall in charge of training activities of Military College of Materials Management, Jabalpur. The Deputy Commandant & Chief Instructor is a two-star rank officer (Major General) from the Indian Army.

List of DC&CI
S. No	Name of DC&CI	Period
1	Maj Gen DD Ghoshal	1999
2	Maj Gen S Mediratta	2000
3	Brig RP Gopal	2001
4	Brig AK Chopra, SM	2002
5	Maj Gen M S Ahluwalia	2003
6	Maj Gen TA D Cunha	2003
7	Maj Gen RD Singh	2004
8	Brig Somen Brahma (Officiating)	2005
9	Brig Narender Dogra (Officiating)	2007
10	Brig AK Seth (Officiating)	2009
11	Brig V G Subramanian (Officiating)	2010
12	Maj Gen AK Seth	2011
13	Brig SS Lamba, SM (Officiating)	2011
14	Brig VP Shahi (Officiating)	2012
15	Maj Gen Anil Kumar	2013
16	Maj Gen RS Rathore	2015
17	Brig RA Mandhar (Officiating)	2016
18	Brig Narendra B Patil (Officiating)	2016
19	Maj Gen Deepinder Singh	2017
20	Maj Gen Rajendra Bana	2020
21	Maj Gen Suresh Chandra Tandi, VSM	2022
22	Maj Gen Vikram Taneja	2022
23	Brig GM Atri (Officiating)	2023
24	Maj Gen NKV Patil, SM	2023

== See also ==
- Military academies in India
