= Yamini Reddy =

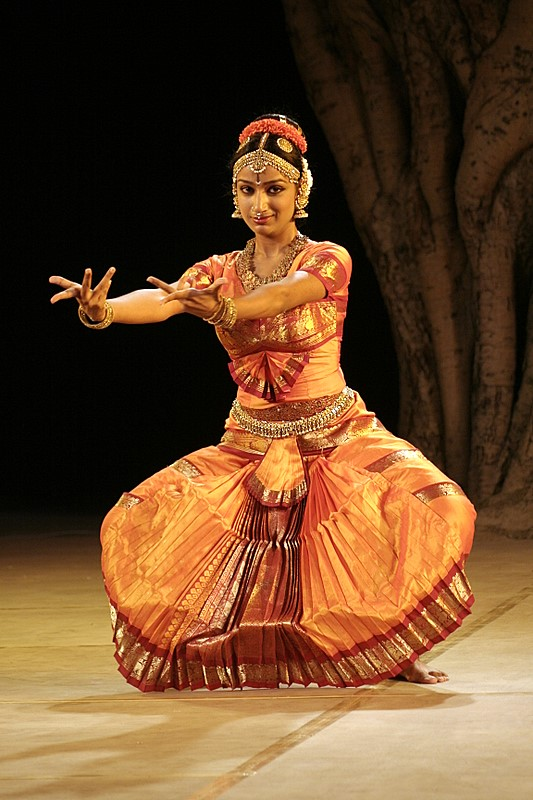
- Performance at Sangeet Natak Akademi Delhi
- Education: Lady Shri Ram College for Women
- Known for: Indian Classical Dance
- Movement: Kuchipudi
- Spouse: Srinivas
- Website: http://www.yaminireddy.com

Yamini Reddy is an Indian Kuchipudi dancer, teacher, choreographer, and the Director of Natya Tarangini, a school dedicated to the teaching of Kuchipudi. She has performed widely in India and abroad.

== Early life ==
Born to Kuchipudi exponents, Dr. Raja and Radha Reddy, she was initiated into the dance form at an early age. She trained in the art form under her parents. She began her career as a young star of the Kuchipudi firmament, performing at the age of 3. Since then, she has been travelling widely for her performances.

She holds a bachelor's degree in commerce (Hons) from Lady Shri Ram College, New Delhi, and is a postgraduate in International Business from Fore School, New Delhi.

== Performing career ==
Reddy has toured the United Kingdom, Europe, the United States, the UAE and South East Asia extensively. She has performed at prestigious Wigmore Hall London in 2011. She also had a successful tour of Russia and East Europe, where she had the opportunity to perform for various heads of state at the BRICS and SCO summit in 2009. She has presented her art before noted personalities like the President of Hungary, First Lady of Slovenia and the former President of India A. P. J. Abdul Kalam.

Reddy's choreographic pursuits have always been well appreciated amidst critics and audiences. Her production, 'Harmony' along with modern dancer Leah Curtis from New York was well received by the audience and was invited to perform at the Nishagandhi Dance Festival in Kerala.

She has also authored a research thesis titled, "Audience Development" for the Performing Arts in India.

== Awards and Accolades ==
Yamini Reddy has been the recipient of many prestigious awards and has been recognised by global organizations for her art.

- District Rotaract Club Award (2000)
- FICCI Young Achievers Award (2006), New Delhi.
- Devadasi National Award (2007)
- Sangeet Natak Akademi, National Bismillah Khan Yuva Puraskar (2008)
- FICCI Young Achievers Award, Hyderabad (2012)
- Awarded the Golden Key to the city by the Mayor of Dublin (Ireland) & Ft Lauderdale (Florida, USA)
- SBJ Legends of Tomorrow title (2015)
- Youngistan' Award, News 24 Channel (2017)
- Pride of Telangana award (2019)

== Natya Tarangini ==
Established in 1976 by Padma Bhushan awardees Raja and Radha Reddy, Natya Tarangini was started to popularize the Kuchipudi style of classical dance in Northern India. It has since evolved into a unique arts institute encompassing all activities involved in the formation of Arts.

In order to further propagate its aim and re-root itself, Raja Radha and Kaushalya Reddy started the Natya Tarangini Hyderabad branch, which is being run by Yamini Reddy's older daughter. Since its establishment in Hyderabad, the school has grown tremendously and annually trains over a hundred students at its Hyderabad branch. Apart from regular classes, Natya Tarangini also actively conducts workshops and sessions by well-known artists from the field of dance and music to enhance its students' learning.
