= Medanta =

Indian private hospital network

- Medanta The Medicity Hospital
- Type: Public
- Traded as: NSE: MEDANTA; BSE: 543654
- ISIN: INE882T01013
- Industry: Healthcare
- Founded: 2009; 17 years ago
- Founders: Naresh Trehan; Sunil Sachdeva
- Headquarters: Gurgaon, Haryana, India
- Areas served: India
- Key people: Naresh Trehan (Chairman); Pankaj Sahni (CEO)
- Services: Hospitals; Clinics
- Revenue: ▲₹3,771 crore (US$390 million) (2025)
- Operating income: ▲₹956 crore (US$99 million) (2025)
- Net income: ▲₹518 crore (US$54 million) (2025)
- Website: www.medanta.org
- Footnotes; Financials as of 31 March 2025.

Global Health Limited, d/b/a Medanta, is an Indian for-profit private hospital network based in Gurgaon. The chain was started in 2009 by cardiac surgeon Naresh Trehan and Sunil Sachdeva.

== History ==
In 2004, cardiac surgeon Naresh Trehan began working on Medanta, along with Sunil Sachdeva, after leaving Escorts Heart Institute. In June 2006, Avenue Capital Group invested ₹224 crore (US$49.44 million) in the venture.

In 2009, Medanta launched its first hospital, Medanta - The Medicity in Gurgaon, a 1250-bed super-specialty hospital spread over 43 acres which was built at a cost of about ₹1,200 crore (US$247.91 million).

In 2013, private equity firm Carlyle Group acquired Avenue Capital Group's 27% stake in Medanta for ₹960 crore (US$163.83 million), valuing the company at ₹3,550 crore (US$605.82 million). In 2015, Singapore-based Temasek Holdings purchased Punj Lloyd's 17.74% stake in the company.

In 2015, Medanta launched a 160-bed hospital in Indore. Later that year, Medanta acquired the Abdur Razzaque Ansari Memorial Weavers' Hospital on the outskirts of Ranchi from Apollo Hospitals.

In 2018, Medanta opened a 200-bed hospital in Sri Ganganagar. In 2019, Medanta began operations of a 1000-bed, multi-specialty hospital in Lucknow called Medanta Avadh, which was constructed at a cost of ₹1,000 crore (US$155.88 million). In 2019, it was reported that Manipal Hospitals had agreed to acquire Medanta for ₹5,800 crore (US$823.63 million). However, the deal was called off later that year.

In 2021, Medanta inaugurated the 500-bed Jay Prabha Medanta Super Specialty Hospital in Patna. In November 2022, Medanta launched its initial public offering.

== Rankings ==
=== India rankings ===
- Medanta-The Medicity: 2nd rank, India's Best Hospital 2020 by Newsweek.
- Medanta-The Medicity: 2nd rank, India's Best Hospital 2021 by Newsweek.
- Medanta-The Medicity: 2nd rank, Best All India Multi Speciality Hospital Ranking 2022 by Outlook (Indian magazine).
- Medanta-The Medicity: 2nd rank, Best Cardiology Multi Speciality Hospital Ranking 2022 by The Times of India.

=== Global rankings ===
- Medanta-The Medicity: 132nd rank, World's Best Hospital 2022 by Newsweek.

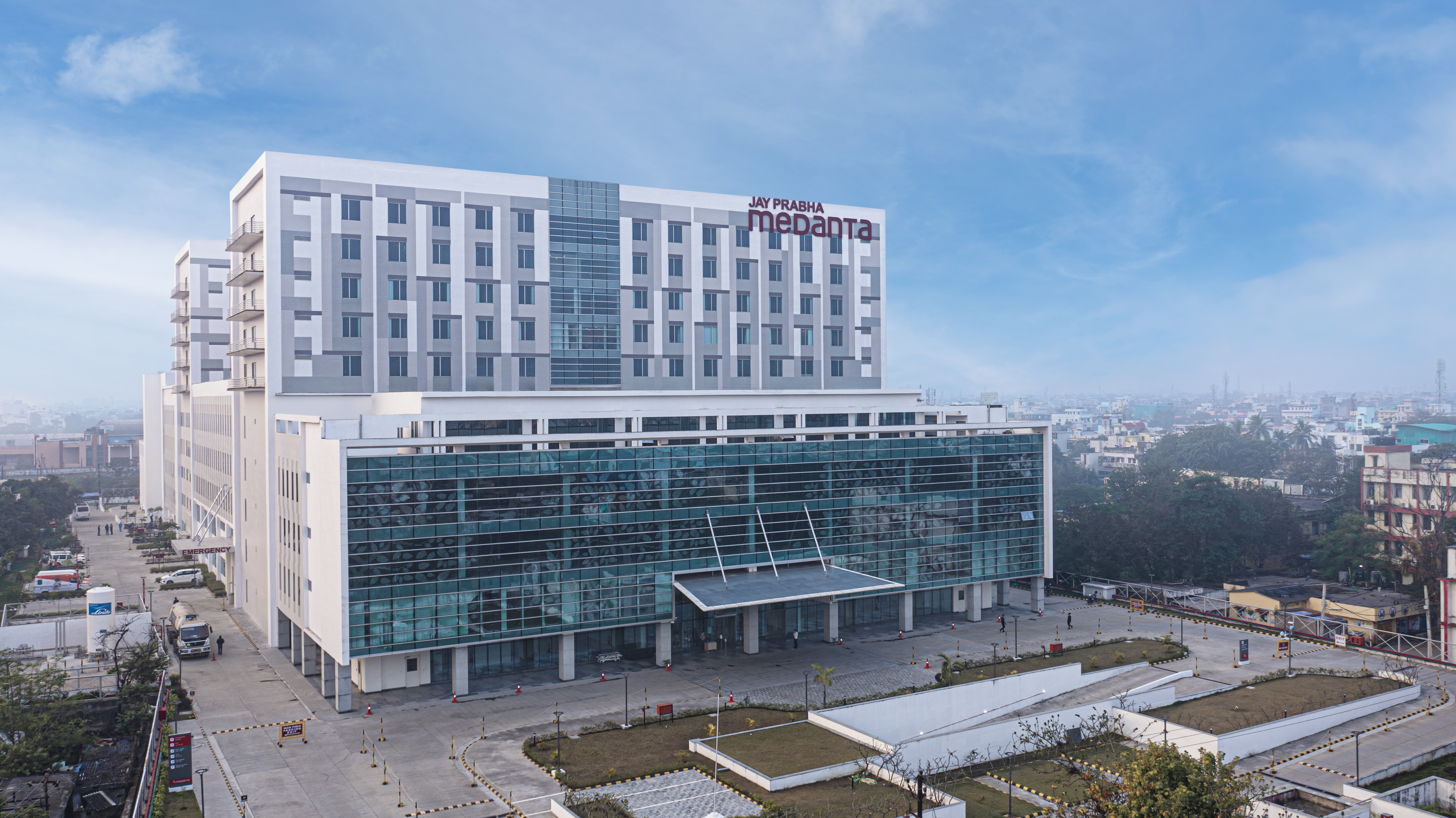
Jay Prabha Medanta Super Specialty Hospital in Patna

== Controversies ==
In 2012, a donor died during the liver transplantation operation despite the fact that a pre-operation medical report clearly stated that donor's liver "was not ideal for donation."

In April 2013, the former Chief Justice of India J. S. Verma died from multiple organ failure at Medanta-The Medicity Hospital. The family of Jurist Verma alleged that he died due to medical negligence. Later, in 2014, the hospital and its team of doctors got the clean chit from the Delhi Medical Council.

In 2014, a Junior doctor employed at Medanta Medicity in Gurgaon was apprehended on allegations of sexual assault and harassment against his sister.

In 2019, the Government of Jharkhand issued a directive to take legal action against the Medanta Abdur Razzaque Ansari Memorial Weavers' Hospital in Ranchi for a suspected instance of medical negligence involving a kidney transplant; the doctors did not filter the blood before the transplant, thus the operation failed. When the public petition was being heard, the patient's relatives brought forward an allegation that the doctor who operated was putting pressure on them to retract the first information report they had filed against him at the Ormanjhi police station.

In 2019, Madhya Pradesh High Court fined the Indore unit of the hospital ₹25 lakh (US$35,501.13), for failing to establish an internal complaints committee as required by Section 4(1) of the Sexual Harassment of Women at Workplace (Prevention, Prohibition and Redressal) Act, 2013.

In June 2020, the Enforcement Directorate filed a money laundering case against the hospital, its chairman Naresh Trehan, Atul Punj and unidentified Haryana government officials for suspected irregularities in the hospital's 2004 land allocation.

In 2021, the District Collector of Indore ordered the closure of Indore's Medanta hospital-owned pharmacy store because "the hospital was not providing any information" to the state's Chief Medical Health Officer (CMHO). Earlier, an inquiry was initiated against an overcharging case by the same officer, but the hospital administration "did not pay heed to it."

== Accidents ==
In 2017, an air ambulance from Medanta Hospital en route to Bangkok was involved in a crash landing at Nakhon Phanom Airport, about 730 kilometers from the Thai capital, resulting in the pilot's death and injuring two medical professionals.

In January 2022, a fire broke out in the intensive care unit of Medanta's Indore hospital. However, there were no reports of any casualties. The hospital's fire alarm system did not appear operational, as the eyewitness stated.
