= Naresh Trehan =

Indian cardiovascular and cardiothoracic surgeon (born 1945)

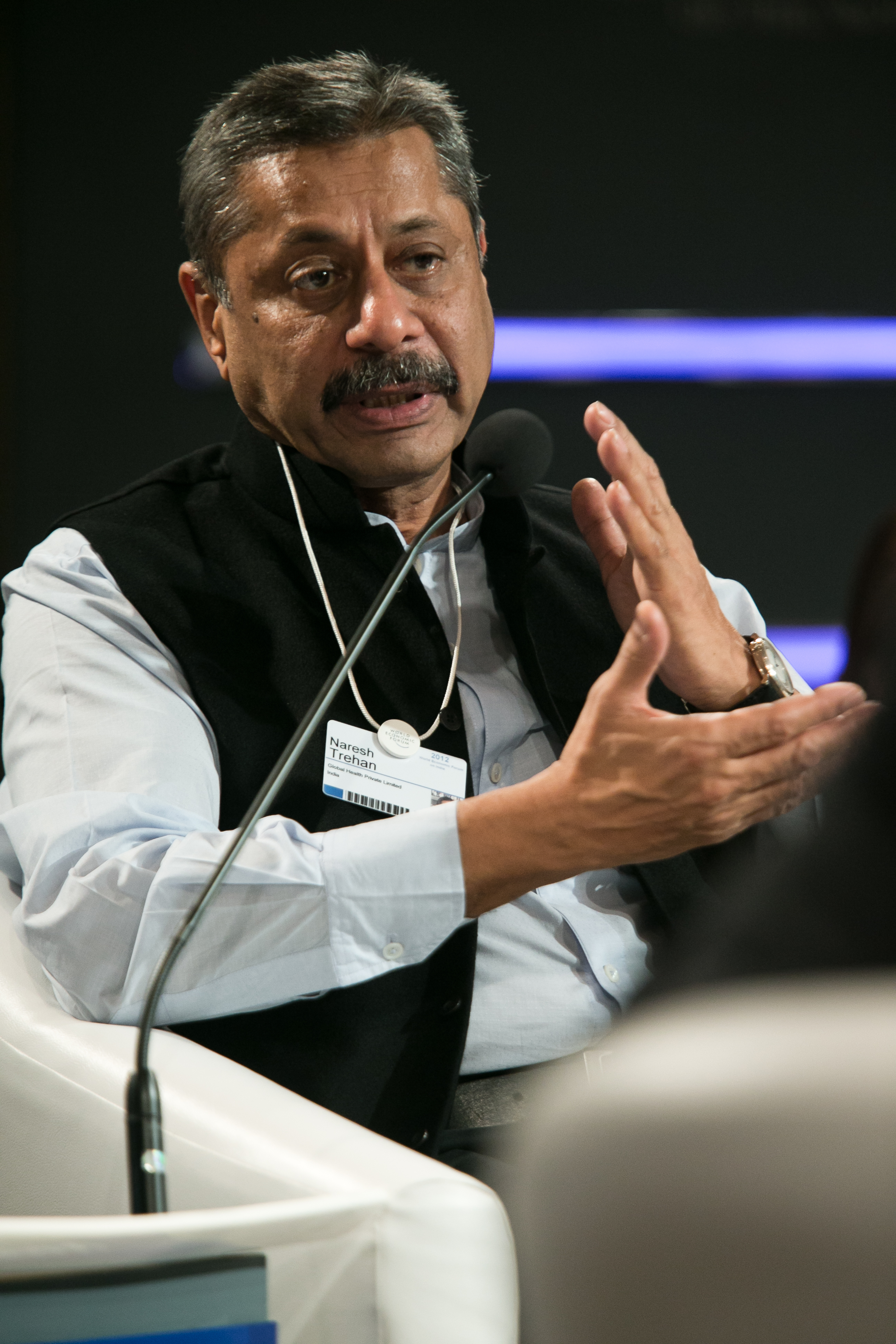
- Trehan in 2012
- Born: 12 August 1945 (age 81); Batala, Punjab, British India
- Education: King George's Medical University (MBBS)
- Occupation: Cardiac surgeon
- Known for: Founder of Medanta
- Spouse: Madhu Trehan
- Children: Shyel Trehan, Shonan Trehan
- Awards: Padma Shri; Padma Bhushan; Lal Bahadur Shastri National Award; Dr. B. C. Roy Award
- Website: www.drnareshtrehan.com

Naresh Trehan (born 12 August 1945) is an Indian cardiovascular and cardiothoracic surgeon. After graduating from King George's Medical University, Lucknow, India, he went on to practice at New York University Medical Center, Manhattan, USA from 1971 to 1988. He returned to India and started Escorts Heart Institute and Research Centre. He serves as the chairman and managing director and chief cardiac surgeon of Medanta-The Medicity. He has served as personal surgeon to the President of India since 1991, has received numerous awards, including the Padma Shri, Padma Bhushan, Lal Bahadur Shastri National Award and Dr. B. C. Roy Award.

== Education and career ==
In 1963 Dr. Trehan got admission in King George's Medical College in Lucknow. In November 1969 he moved to USA and became a first-year resident at the Thomas Jefferson University Hospital in Philadelphia.

Trehan was the founder, director and chief cardiovascular surgeon of Escorts Heart Institute and Research Center (EHIRC), which opened on Okhla Road, Delhi in 1988. Presently, Trehan is the Founder Chairman of Medanta - The Medicity one of the largest multi-specialty hospital at Gurgaon, Haryana established in 2009. Trehan has been president of the International Society for Minimally Invasive Cardiac Surgery.

As chairman of Global Health Private Ltd., Trehan has overseen the building of an integrated health care facility in Gurgaon, India, currently referred to as Medanta - The Medicity. Medicity is spread across 43 acres (170,000 m^{2}) of land. Collaborating with Siemens and other financial partners, Medicity combines modern medicine with traditional medicine and holistic therapies.

== Biography ==
His mother was a gynaecologist and his father was an ENT specialist. Both of them practised in Lyallpur until the partition of India his family belonged to Sri Hargobindapur, Batala. He was born left-handed, but due to stigma his Hindi tutor broke his left hand to force Trehan to write with the right hand. In September 1969 he married and moved to USA in November. They have two daughters Shyel and Shonan. Shyel is a lawyer married to Pankaj Sahni, who is the CEO of Medanta. His wife, Madhu Trehan, is a journalist and writer.

== Honors ==
- Padma Bhushan Award by President of India in recognition of distinguished service in the field of Cardiology Medicine in 2001.
- Padma Shri Award by President of India in recognition of distinguished service in the field of Surgery in 1991.
- Dr. B. C. Roy Award from the Medical Council of India in 2002.
- India Today magazine ranked him #35th in India's 50 Most powerful people of 2017 list.
