= List of people from Delhi =

This is a list of notable people from Delhi, India.

== Architect ==
- Ratish Nanda, conservation architect

== Author ==
- Anurag Anand
- Asloob Ahmad Ansari
- Chetan Bhagat
- Bedil Dehlavi (1642–1720), poet
- Daagh Dehlvi, Urdu poet
- Ghalib, Urdu/Persian poet
- Kiran Desai
- Madhur Jaffrey
- Meenakshi Jain
- Ritu Lalit
- Jaishree Misra
- Amrita Pritam
- Aman Nath
- Tushar Raheja
- Imdad Sabri
- Nattal Sahu, writer during Tomara reign
- Shobha Deepak Singh
- Nitin Soni
- Vibudh Shridhar, writer in medieval period
- Sudhir Tailang, cartoonist
- Valmik Thapar
- Zauq, poet laureate of Mughal court
- Bahadurshah Zafar, Mughal king (last to rule from Mughal Dynasty) and Urdu poet

== Business ==
- Kunal Bahl, entrepreneur
- Rohit Bansal, entrepreneur
- Vijay Shekhar Sharma, entrepreneur, Paytm
- Analjit Singh, entrepreneur, Max Group
- Vikram Lal, entrepreneur, Eicher Motors
- Jawed Habib, hairstylist, entrepreneur
- Patu Keswani, entrepreneur
- Surinder Mehta
- Bharat Ram
- Kunwer Sachdev, entrepreneur
- Ajay Singh, businessman, sports administrator, bureaucrat and investor

== Education ==
- Jasleen Dhamija (born 1933), textile historian
- Deepak Gaur, molecular biologist, and professor
- Anil Grover
- Partha Sarathi Gupta
- Champat Rai Jain
- Hakim Ajmal Khan
- Syed Ahmad Khan
- Madhu Khanna
- Sunil Kothari
- Sushil Kumar Saxena
- Malati Shendge
- Sampat Kumar Tandon

== Journalist ==
- Gopinath Aman
- Afshan Anjum
- Vikram Chandra
- Barkha Dutt
- Sagarika Ghose
- Sonal Kalra
- Mayanti Langer
- Charul Malik
- Rajat Sharma
- Sabina Sehgal Saikia
- Hari Shankar Vyas

== Law and judiciary ==
- Sanjiv Khanna
- Subodh Markandeya

== Medical ==
- Daljeet Singh Gambhir
- Hemlata Gupta
- Jitendra Mohan Hans
- Ganesh Kumar Mani
- Siddhartha Mukherjee
- Indira Nath
- Abha Saxena
- Krishna Gopal Saxena
- Santosh Kumar Sen
- Sujata Sharma
- Noshir M. Shroff, ophthalmologist
- M. V. Padma Srivastava
- Nikhil Tandon
- Brihaspati Dev Triguna

== Military ==
- Anuj Nayyar, Indian army captain

== Performing arts ==
=== Actors ===
- Varun Badola
- Arjan Bajwa
- Manoj Bakshi
- Rohit Bakshi
- Rakesh Bedi
- Tahir Raj Bhasin
- Gajendra Chauhan
- Priyanshu Chatterjee
- Gaurav Chopra
- Mukul Dev
- Rahul Dev
- Ajay Devgan (born 1969), Indian Bollywood actor and producer
- Rajneesh Duggal
- Gulshan Grover
- Karan Singh Grover, television and Bollywood actor
- Zain Imam, television actor
- Sourabh Raj Jain, television actor
- Kishore Namit Kapoor
- Ram Kapoor
- Shahid Kapoor
- Shakti Kapoor
- Saif Ali Khan (born 1970), Indian actor
- Shah Rukh Khan (born 1965), Indian Bollywood actor
- Rajesh Khattar, actor
- Samir Kochhar
- Himansh Kohli
- Akshay Kumar
- Darshan Kumar
- Manoj Kumar
- Laksh Lalwani
- Pavan Malhotra
- Siddharth Malhotra, actor
- Shivin Narang
- Hiten Noonwal
- Manoj Pahwa
- Ssumier Pasricha, actor and comedian
- Pran
- Vijay Raaz
- Gautam Rode
- Sumeet Sachdev
- Anuj Sachdeva
- Amit Sadh
- Saqib Saleem
- Pulkit Samrat
- Keith Sequeira
- Divyendu Sharma
- Satyajit Sharma
- Saurabh Shukla
- Inderpal Singh
- Manjot Singh
- Shaurya Singh
- Barun Sobti, television actor
- Karan Wahi
- Mohammed Zeeshan Ayyub
- Manit Joura, television actor

=== Actress ===
- Anu Aggarwal
- Roma Arora
- Neelima Azeem
- Naseem Banu
- Ritu Barmecha
- Bipasha Basu
- Swara Bhaskar
- Bibbo
- Sheeba Chaddha
- Isha Chawla
- Ridhi Dogra
- Esha Gupta
- Neena Gupta
- Padmapriya Janakiraman
- Vaani Kapoor
- Minissha Lamba
- Radhika Madan
- Madhubala (1933–1969), Indian Bollywood actress
- Rashi Mal
- Sanya Malhotra
- Manasvi Mamgai
- Monal Naval
- Arundathi Nag
- Shonali Nagrani
- Aishveryaa Nidhi
- Tapsee Pannu
- Huma Qureshi, actress
- Kriti Sanon, actress
- Amba Sanyal (born 1945), stage actor and costume designer
- Deeksha Seth
- Pooja Sharma
- Urvashi Sharma
- Deepika Singh
- Kashish Singh
- Neetu Singh
- Rakul Preet Singh
- Raashi Khanna
- Sarika Thakur
- Vani Tripathi

=== Directors, producers and writers ===
- Atul Agnihotri
- Shubhavi Arya
- Vikas Bahl (born 1971), Indian film producer, screenwriter, and director
- Dev Benegal
- Aditya Dhar
- Amar Kanwar (born 1964), Indian film director and contemporary artist
- Rajat Kapoor
- Bhushan Kumar
- Divya Khosla Kumar
- Gulshan Kumar
- Anu Malhotra
- Rakeysh Omprakash Mehra
- Nisha Pahuja
- Aanand L. Rai
- Maneesh Sharma
- Alankrita Shrivastava
- Loveleen Tandan

=== Singers and musicians ===
- KK (singer)
- Sunidhi Chauhan
- Javed Ali
- Badshah, rapper and singer
- Akriti Kakar
- Prakriti Kakar
- Sukriti Kakar
- Harshdeep Kaur
- Tulsi Kumar
- Madhup Mudgal
- Anushka Manchanda
- Mukesh (1923–1976), Indian playback singer from 1940s-1970s Hindi cinema
- Bif Naked (born 1971), Canadian punk rock singer
- Peter Plate (born 1967), German singer, songwriter and producer (Rosenstolz)
- Yo Yo Honey Singh, rapper and producer
- Ikka Singh, rapper and singer
- Seedhe Maut, Hip hop duo

=== Choreography ===
- Shakti Mohan

== Philanthropists and social workers ==
- Kiran Martin

== Photographers ==
- Adnan Abidi
- Pablo Bartholomew
- Pamella Bordes
- Arko Datta
- Gauri Gill
- Saadiya Kochar
- Vicky Roy
- Danish Siddiqui
- Dayanita Singh
- Shobha Deepak Singh
- Komala Varadan
- Vineet Vohra

== Politics ==
- Paddy Ashdown (1941–2018), British politician
- Ramesh Bidhuri
- Ramvir Singh Bidhuri
- Michael Bennet (born 1964), American politician
- Sheila Dikshit, former chief minister
- Gautam Gambhir
- Maneka Gandhi
- Priyanka Gandhi
- Rahul Gandhi
- S. Jaishankar
- Arun Jaitley
- Arvind Kejriwal, ex chief minister
- Meenakshi Lekhi, cabinet minister
- Chaudhary Bharat Singh
- Ajay Maken
- Pervez Musharraf (born 1943), Pakistani politician
- Kedar Nath Sahani
- Kanwar Singh Tanwar
- Harsh Vardhan
- Sahib Singh Verma
- Parvesh Sahib Singh Verma

== Rulers ==
=== Rajputs ===
- Anangpal Tomar, King of Haryana and Delhi
- Prithviraj Chauhan, King of much of North India

=== Sayyids ===
- Muhammad Shah

=== Lodi ===
- Ibrahim Lodhi

=== Mughals ===
- Ahmad Shah Bahadur
- Shah Alam II
- Bahadur Shah Zafar

== Science ==
- Diwakar Vaish, roboticist
- Ashok Goel, computer scientist

== Sports ==
=== Athletic ===
- Arun Bhardwaj
- Amoj Jacob
- Lalit Mathur
- Tejaswin Shankar
- Sourabh Vij

=== Badminton ===
- Damayanti Tambay

=== Billiards ===
- Geet Sethi (born 1961), Indian billiard player and world champion

=== Chess ===
- Aryan Chopra
- Sahaj Grover
- Parimarjan Negi (born 1993), Indian chess player
- Tania Sachdev

=== Cricket ===
- Mohinder Amarnath
- Kirti Azad
- Amit Bhandari
- Unmukt Chand
- Chetan Chauhan
- Aakash Chopra
- Anjum Chopra
- Nikhil Chopra
- Vijay Dahiya
- Shikhar Dhawan
- Salim Durani
- Gautam Gambhir
- Rajinder Goel
- Shilpa Gupta
- Ajay Jadeja
- Surinder Khanna
- Virat Kohli
- Raman Lamba
- Warren Lee
- Reema Malhotra
- Mithun Manhas
- Amit Mishra
- Parvinder Awana
- Ashish Nehra
- Mansoor Ali Khan Pataudi
- Manoj Prabhakar
- Vivek Razdan
- Rahul Sanghvi
- Virender Sehwag
- Ajay Sharma
- Amita Sharma
- Ishant Sharma
- Sanjeev Sharma
- Robin Singh, Jr.
- Sunil Valson
- Atul Wassan

=== Football ===
- Jyoti Ann Burrett
- Aayushmaan Chaturvedi
- Aditi Chauhan
- Dalima Chhibber
- Narender Gahlot
- Tanvie Hans
- Rohit Kumar
- Munmun Lugun
- Ishan Pandita

=== Golf ===
- Gaurav Ghei
- Shiv Kapur
- Rashid Khan
- Chiragh Kumar
- Mukesh Kumar
- Amit Luthra
- Himmat Rai
- Jyoti Randhawa
- Digvijay Singh

=== Hockey ===
- Raghbir Singh Bhola
- Arthur Charles Hind
- Abdul Qayyum Khan
- Manju Phalswal
- Jaswant Singh Rajput
- Aziz-ur Rehman
- Joginder Singh
- Khawaja Muhammad Taqi

=== Judo ===
- Harsh Singh

=== Martial art ===
- Om Prakash Bhardwaj
- Akram Shah
- Narender Singh

=== Skiing ===
- Neha Ahuja, Winter Olympian
- Shailaja Kumar, Winter Olympian

=== Table tennis ===
- Manika Batra
- Indu Puri

=== Boxing ===
- Gaurav Bidhuri, world boxing Bronze medal winner

=== Tennis ===
- Ankita Bhambri
- Prerna Bhambri
- Yuki Bhambri
- Divij Sharan
- Ashutosh Singh
- Jasjit Singh

=== Wrestling ===
- Jyoti
- Parkash Gian
- Guru Hanuman
- Sonika Kaliraman
- Pawan Kumar
- Sushil Kumar
- Sujeet Maan
- Malwa Singh
- Satpal Singh

== Miscellaneous ==
- Ravi Gulati (born 1974), social activist
- Kartik Kumra (born 2000), fashion designer and founder of Kartik Research
- Laila Tyabji (born 1947), co-founder of Dastkar, Padma Shri (2012)
