= Baoxian =

Baoxian is the atonal pinyin romanization of various Chinese names and words.

It may refer to:

- Insurance companies, which typically incorporate the word bǎoxiǎn (保險) in their Chinese names
- Baoxian (寶賢), a 5th-century Chinese Buddhist nun
- Xie Baoxian (謝寶賢), a Chinese soccer player
- Di Baoxian, founder of Funü Shibao (Women's News)
