= Naugawan Sadat Assembly constituency =

Constituency of the Uttar Pradesh legislative assembly in India

Naugawan Sadat
- Constituency No. 40 for the Uttar Pradesh Legislative Assembly

Constituency details
- Country: India
- Region: North India
- State: Uttar Pradesh
- District: Amroha
- Established: 2008
- Total electors: 3,06,855 (2017)
- Reservation: None

Member of Legislative Assembly
- 18th Uttar Pradesh Legislative Assembly
- Incumbent Samarpal Singh
- Party: Samajwadi Party
- Elected year: 2020

Naugawan Sadat is one of the 403 constituencies of the Uttar Pradesh Legislative Assembly, India. It is a part of the Amroha City and one of the five assembly constituencies in the Amroha Lok Sabha constituency. The first election in this assembly constituency was held in 2012 after the "Delimitation of Parliamentary and Assembly Constituencies Order, 2008" was passed in the year 2008. The constituency is assigned identification number 40. Naugawan Sadat was founded by Maulana Fakhruddin

== Wards/Areas ==
Extent of Naugawan Sadat Assembly constituency are KCs Naugawan Sadat, Kailsa & Naugawan Sadat NP of Amroha Tehsil; PCs Mubarakpur Kalan, Rajoha, Machra Bhagwanpur, Koovi, Karanpur Mafi, Sihali Jageer, Katai, Jeehal, Tanda, Tasiha, Chakori, Umarpur, Manauta, Gharont, Taharpur of Hasanpur KC of Hasanpur Tehsil.

== Members of the Vidhan Sabha ==
#	Term	Name	Party	From	To	Days	Comments	Ref
00	15th Vidhan Sabha	Seat did not exist						
01	16th Vidhan Sabha	Ashfaq Ali Khan	Samajwadi Party	March-2012	March-2017	-	-	
02	17th Vidhan Sabha	Chetan Chauhan	Bharatiya Janata Party	Mar-2017	Aug-2020		Died in Aug-2020	
02	17th Vidhan Sabha	Sangeeta Chauhan^	Bharatiya Janata Party	Nov-2020	Mar-2022		^ By poll	
03	18th Vidhan Sabha	Samarpal Singh	Samajwadi Party	Mar-2022	Incumbent			

== Election results ==
=== 2027 ===
2027 Uttar Pradesh Legislative Assembly election: Naugawan Sadat
Party	Candidate	Votes	%	±%
INDIA				
NDA				
BSP				
NOTA	None of the above			
Majority				
Turnout				
gain from		Swing		

=== 2022 ===
2022 Uttar Pradesh Legislative Assembly election: Naugawan Sadat
Party	Candidate	Votes	%	±%
SP	Samarpal Singh	108,497	44.31	▲11.69
BJP	Devendra Nagpal	101,957	41.64	▲0.21
BSP	Shadab Khan	28,688	11.72	▼5.43
NOTA	None of the above	938	0.38	▼0.11
Majority		6,540	2.67	▼6.14
Turnout		244,837	74.49	▼1.83
SP gain from BJP		Swing		

=== 2020 ===
By-Election, 2020: Naugawan Sadat
Party	Candidate	Votes	%	±%
BJP	Sangeeta Chauhan	86,692	41.72	
SP	Javed Abbas	71,615	34.46	
BSP	Mohammad Furkan	38,399	18.48	
INC	Kamlesh Singh	4,532	2.18	
NOTA	None of the Above	764	0.37	
Majority		15,077		
Turnout		2,08,726	64.68	
BJP hold		Swing		

=== 2017 ===
17th Vidhan Sabha: 2017 General Elections

2017 Uttar Pradesh Legislative Assembly election: Naugawan Sadat
Party	Candidate	Votes	%	±%
BJP	Chetan Chauhan	97,030	41.43	
SP	Javed Abbas	76,382	32.62	
BSP	Jaidev Singh	40,172	17.15	
RLD	Ashfaq Ali Khan	14,597	6.23	
NOTA	None of the above	1,132	0.49	
Majority		20,648	8.81	
Turnout		234,190	76.32	
BJP gain from SP		Swing	+34.09	

=== 2012 ===
2012 Uttar Pradesh Legislative Assembly election: Naugawan Sadat
Party	Candidate	Votes	%	±%
SP	Ashfaq Ali Khan	55,626	27.47	−
BSP	Rahul Kumar	51,964	25.66	−
RLD	Anshu Nagpal	36,695	18.12	−
	Remainder 15 candidates	58,225	28.75	−
Majority		3,662	1.81	−
Turnout		202,510	72.57	−
SP hold		Swing		

== See also ==
- Amroha Lok Sabha constituency
- Jyotiba Phule Nagar
- Sixteenth Legislative Assembly of Uttar Pradesh
- Uttar Pradesh Legislative Assembly
