= Amroha Lok Sabha constituency =

Lok Sabha Constituency in Uttar Pradesh

Coordinates: 28.9°N 78.47°E

Amroha UP-9
- Lok Sabha constituency
- Interactive Map Outlining Amroha Lok Sabha constituency

Constituency details
- Country: India
- Region: North India
- State: Uttar Pradesh
- Assembly constituencies: Dhanaura; Naugawan Sadat; Amroha; Hasanpur; Garhmukteshwar
- Established: 1952
- Total electors: 17,16,681
- Reservation: None

Member of Parliament
- 18th Lok Sabha
- Incumbent Kanwar Singh Tanwar
- Party: BJP
- Alliance: NDA
- Elected year: 2024

Amroha (Hindi pronunciation: [əmɾoːɦaː]) is one of the 80 Lok Sabha (parliamentary) constituencies in Uttar Pradesh.

== Assembly segments ==
At present Amroha Loksabha Constituency consists of following Assembly Constituencies :

No	Name	District	Member	Party	2024 Lead
39	Dhanaura (SC)	Amroha	Rajeev Tarara	BJP	BJP
40	Naugawan Sadat	Amroha	Samarpal Singh	SP	BJP
41	Amroha	Amroha	Mehboob Ali	SP	INC
42	Hasanpur	Amroha	Mahender Singh Khadakvanshi	BJP	BJP
60	Garhmukteshwar	Hapur	Harendra Singh Tewatia	BJP	BJP

== Members of Parliament ==
Year	Member	Party
1952	Hifzur Rahman Seoharwi	Indian National Congress
1957	Hifzur Rahman Seoharwi	Indian National Congress
1962	Hifzur Rahman Seoharwi	Indian National Congress
1963^	J. B. Kripalani	
1967	Ishaq Sambhali	Communist Party of India
1971	Ishaq Sambhali	Communist Party of India
1977	Chandrapal Singh	Janata Party
1980	Chandrapal Singh	Janata Party
1984	Ram Pal Singh	Indian National Congress
1989	Har Govind Singh	Janata Dal
1991	Chetan Chauhan	Bharatiya Janata Party
1996	Pratap Singh Saini	Samajwadi Party
1998	Chetan Chauhan	Bharatiya Janata Party
1999	Rashid Alvi	Bahujan Samaj Party
2004	Harish Nagpal	Independent
2009	Devendra Nagpal	Rashtriya Lok Dal
2014	Kanwar Singh Tanwar	Bharatiya Janata Party
2019	Kunwar Danish Ali	Bahujan Samaj Party
2024	Kanwar Singh Tanwar	Bharatiya Janata Party

== Election results ==
=== General Election 2024 ===
2024 Indian general elections: Amroha
Party	Candidate	Votes	%	±%
BJP	Kanwar Singh Tanwar	476,506	42.90	▼3.10
INC	Kunwar Danish Ali	447,836	40.32	▲39.25
BSP	Mujahid Hussain	164,099	14.77	▼36.64
NOTA	None of the above	5,900	0.53	▼0.04
Majority		28,670	2.58	▼2.83
Turnout		11,10,690	64.70	▼6.35
BJP gain from BSP		Swing		

=== General Election 2019 ===
2019 Indian general elections: Amroha
Party	Candidate	Votes	%	±%
BSP	Kunwar Danish Ali	601,082	51.41	▲36.54
BJP	Kanwar Singh Tanwar	5,37,834	46.00	▼2.26
INC	Sachin Chaudhary	12,510	1.07	
NOTA	None of the Above	6,617	0.57	
Majority		63,248	5.41	
Turnout		11,69,754	71.05	+0.08
BSP gain from BJP		Swing		

=== General election 2014 ===
2014 Indian general elections: Amroha
Party	Candidate	Votes	%	±%
BJP	Kanwar Singh Tanwar	528,880	48.26	▲48.26
SP	Humera Akhtar	3,70,666	33.82	▲6.77
BSP	Farhat Hasan	1,62,983	14.87	▼9.25
RLD	Rakesh Tikait	9,539	0.87	▼39.22
AAP	Syed Kalbe Rushaid Rizvi	2,601	0.24	▲0.24
NOTA	None of the Above	7,779	0.71	▲0.71
Majority		1,58,214	14.44	▲1.40
Turnout		10,95,895	70.97	▲10.80
BJP gain from RLD		Swing	▲8.17	

== See also ==
- Amroha district
- List of constituencies of the Lok Sabha
