= J. B. Kripalani =

Indian politician (1888-1982)

Jivatram Bhagwandas Kripalani
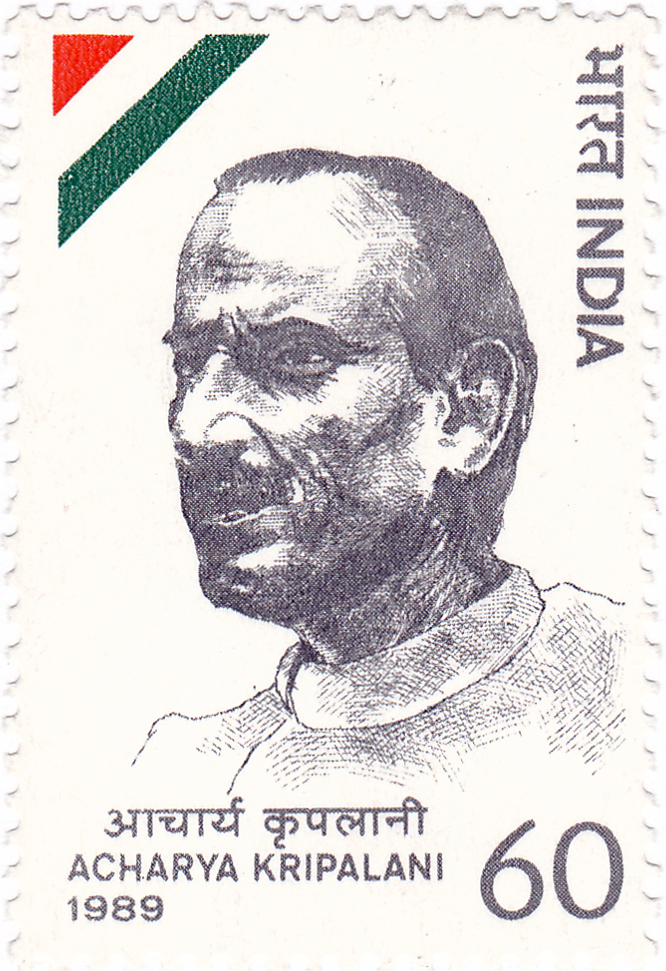
- Kripalani on a 1989 stamp of India

Member of Parliament, Lok Sabha
- In office 1967 (Note: by-election)–1971
- Preceded by: Vijaya Raje Scindia
- Succeeded by: Madhavrao Scindia
- Constituency: Guna, Madhya Pradesh
- In office 1962–1967
- Preceded by: Hifzur Rahman Seoharwi
- Succeeded by: Ishaq Sambhali
- Constituency: Amroha, Uttar Pradesh
- In office 1957–1962
- Preceded by: Constituency established
- Succeeded by: Nagendra Prasad Yadav
- Constituency: Sitamarhi, Bihar
- In office 1952–1957 Serving with K. Musahar
- Preceded by: Anup Lal Mehta; Kirai Mushahar
- Succeeded by: Banarsi Prasad Jhunjhunwala
- Constituency: Bhagalpur cum Purnea, Bihar

Member of the Provisional Parliament
- In office 1950–1952
- Constituency: United Province

Member of the Constituent Assembly
- In office 1946–1950
- Constituency: United Province

Personal details
- Born: 11 November 1888 Hyderabad, Bombay Presidency, British India (present-day Sindh, Pakistan)
- Died: 19 March 1982 (aged 93) Ahmedabad, Gujarat, India
- Party: Indian National Congress, Praja Socialist Party; Kisan Mazdoor Praja Party; Swatantra Party
- Spouse: Sucheta Kripalani
- Education: Wilson College, Fergusson College, Bombay University
- Occupation: Politician
- Known for: Indian Independence Movement

Jivatram Bhagwandas Kripalani (11 November 1888 – 19 March 1982), popularly known as Acharya Kripalani, was an Indian politician, noted particularly for holding the presidency of the Indian National Congress during the transfer of power in 1947 and the husband of Sucheta Kripalani. Kripalani was an environmentalist, mystic and independence activist who was long a Gandhian socialist. He himself founded the Kisan Mazdoor Praja Party in 1951, that merged with the Socialist Party to form the Praja Socialist Party the following year. He joined the economically right wing Swatantra Party later in life.

He grew close to Gandhi and at one point, he was one of Gandhi's most ardent disciples. He had served as the General Secretary of the INC for almost a decade. He had experience working in the field of education and was made the president to rebuild the INC. Disputes between the party and the Government over procedural matters affected his relationship with the colleagues in the Government. Kripalani was a familiar figure to generations of dissenters, from the Non-Cooperation Movements of the 1920s to the Emergency of the 1970s.

He was the first member to address the Constituent Assembly of India.

== Early life ==
Jivatram (also spelled Jiwatram) Bhagwandas Kripalani was born into a Sindhi family in Hyderabad in the province of Sindh of British India, in 1888. Following his education at Fergusson College in Pune, he worked as a school teacher before joining the freedom movement in the wake of Gandhi's return from South Africa. From 1912 to 1917 Kripalani worked as a lecturer of English and history at L.S. College (then known as Grier BB College), Muzaffarpur, Bihar. Kripalani was involved in the Non-Cooperation Movement of the early 1920s. He worked in Gandhi's ashrams in Gujarat and Maharashtra on tasks of social reform and education, and later left for Bihar and the United Provinces in northern India to teach and organise new ashrams. He courted arrested on numerous occasions during the Civil Disobedience movements and smaller occasions of organising protests and publishing seditious material against the British Raj.

== Congress leader ==
Kripalani joined the All India Congress Committee and became its general secretary in 1928–29.

Kripalani was prominently involved for over a decade in top Congress party affairs, and in the organisation of the Salt Satyagraha and the Quit India Movement. Kripalani served in the interim government of India (1946–1947) and the Constituent Assembly of India. During this time he rejected the proposal of United Bengal from Abul Hashim and Sarat Bose and called for the division of Bengal and the Punjab.

He had served as the General Secretary of the INC for 12 years. He had experience working in the field of education and was made the president to rebuild the INC. Disputes between the party and the Government over procedural matters affected his relationship with the colleagues in the Government.

== As Congress President and the election of 1950 ==
In spite of being ideologically at odds with both Vallabhbhai Patel and Jawaharlal Nehru – he was elected Congress President for the crucial years around Indian independence in 1947. After Gandhi's assassination in January 1948, Nehru rejected his demand that the party's views should be sought in all decisions. Nehru, with the support of Patel, told Kripalani that while the party was entitled to lay down the broad principles and guidelines, it could not be granted a say in the government's day-to-day affairs.

== Later life ==
In 1972-73, he agitated against the increasingly authoritarian rule of Nehru's daughter Indira Gandhi, then Prime Minister of India. Kripalani and Jayaprakash Narayan felt that Gandhi's rule had become dictatorial and anti-democratic. Her conviction on charges of using government machinery for her election campaign galvanised her political opposition and public disenchantment against her policies. Along with Jayaprakash Narayan, Kripalani toured the country urging non-violent protest and civil disobedience. When the Emergency was declared as a result of the vocal dissent he helped stir up, the octogenarian Kripalani was among the first of the opposition leaders to be arrested on the night of 26 June 1975. He lived long enough to survive the Emergency and see the first non-Congress government since Independence following the Janata Party victory in the 1977 polls. He and Narayan, as two veteran leaders, were requested to choose the parliamentary leader of the new party who would be the prime minister, and settled on Morarji Desai.

Acharya Kripalani died on 19 March 1982 at the Civil Hospital in Ahmedabad, at the age of 93.

A stamp was issued on 11 November 1989 by the Indian Postal Department to commemorate the 101st anniversary of his birth.

== See also ==
- Indian Nationalism
- Gandhism
- Indian Independence Movement
- Indian National Congress
- Indian Emergency

== Biography ==
- Ram Bahadur Rai, Shaswat Vidrohi Rajneta: Acharya J.B. Kripalani, National Book Trust, India, 2013.
