= Aayushmaan Chaturvedi =

Indian footballer (born 1994)

Personal information
- Date of birth: 25 October 1994 (age 32)
- Place of birth: New Delhi, India
- Height: 1.75 m (5 ft 9 in)
- Positions: Attacking midfielder; winger

Team information
- Current team: Victoria Częstochowa
- Number: 23

Youth career
- 2010–2011: Ashoka FC
- 2012–2014: Brooke House College

Senior career*
Years	Team	Apps	(Gls)
2014–2016	Mohun Bagan	2	(0)
2016–2017	Minerva Punjab		
2017–2018	Sudeva Moonlight	8	(1)
2018–2019	Quartz Calicut	14	(6)
2019–2020	George Telegraph	9	(2)
2021–2022	Ahbab	16	(4)
2022	Włodawianka Włodawa	1	(0)
2022–2023	Spółdzielca Siedliszcze	24	(7)
2023–2024	Grom Kąkolewnica	9	(1)
2024–2025	Szczakowianka Jaworzno	7	(0)
2025	Polonia 1908 Marcinki Kępno	5	(0)
2025–2026	Przemsza Siewierz	5	(1)
2026	Victoria Częstochowa	7	(0)
- * Club domestic league appearances and goals as of 17:44, 18 October 2026 (UTC)

Aayushmaan Chaturvedi (born 25 October 1994) is an Indian professional footballer who plays as an attacking midfielder for IV liga Silesia club Victoria Częstochowa.

== Early life ==
Born in New Delhi, Delhi, Chaturvedi started playing football in early school life. He was a youth player with Ashoka FC, under Anadi Barua, a former India international player. In 2012, he moved to England on a scholarship and joined Brooke House College Football Academy in Leicestershire, where he played until 2014. His professional career began when he signed a contract with Mohun Bagan, making his debut at the age of 19. He was also a part of 2015 ISL Domestic Draft for the second edition of Indian Super League.

== Club career ==
=== India ===
Played for Mohun Bagan A.C. from 2014 to 2016 in the I-League, and next season shifted to Minerva Punjab FC in the 2015–16 I-League 2nd Division. Next season he played for Sudeva Moonlight F.C. in 2017–18 I-League 2nd Division. Chaturvedi joined Quartz S.C. for the 2018–19 season and also was runner-up in the tournament in his debut with the club.

=== Poland ===
In April 2022, it was confirmed that Chaturvedi joined Polish club Włodawianka Włodawa. He appeared with the club in fifth division (IV liga).

Later in August 2022, he joined another Polish club Spółdzielca Siedliszcze, that competes in the V liga and based in Chełm district. He scored his first goal for the club on 21 August against Unia Rejowiec in their 4–1 defeat. He was the first ever Indian player to score in the Polish league system.

In July 2023, Chaturvedi joined another Polish IV liga outfit Grom Kąkolewnica. In March 2024, Chaturvedi joined Szczakowianka Jaworzno.

== Awards ==
In 2012, Chaturvedi won Scholarship for Brooke House Football Academy (Leicestershire, England).

== Honours ==
Mohun Bagan

- I-League: 2014–15

== See also ==
- List of Indian football players in foreign leagues
- List of people from Delhi
