= Emin Safikhanov =

Azerbaijani footballer (born 1999)

Personal information
- Full name: Emin Shakhin ogly Safikhanov
- Date of birth: 19 December 1999 (age 26)
- Place of birth: Sumgait, Azerbaijan
- Height: 1.80 m (5 ft 11 in)
- Position: Left-back

Team information
- Current team: 1. FC Monheim
- Number: 3

Youth career
- 2013–2015: Metalurh Donetsk
- 2015–2016: Metalist Kharkiv

Senior career*
Years	Team	Apps	(Gls)
2016–2018	Zorya Luhansk	0	(0)
2018–2019	Olimpik Donetsk	0	(0)
2019	Arsenal Kyiv	0	(0)
2019–2021	Chaika Petropavlivska Borshchahivka	36	(4)
2021–2021	Hirnyk-Sport Horishni Plavni	15	(0)
2022	Podillya Khmelnytskyi	0	(0)
2022	Włodawianka Włodawa	12	(14)
2022	DV Solingen	19	(6)
2023–	1. FC Monheim	0	(0)
- * Club domestic league appearances and goals as of 11 February 2023

Emin Shakhin ohly Safikhanov (Ukrainian: Емін Шахін огли Сафіханов; born 19 December 1999) is an Azerbaijani professional footballer who plays as a left-back for Oberliga Niederrhein club 1. FC Monheim.
