= Raashid Alvi =

Indian politician

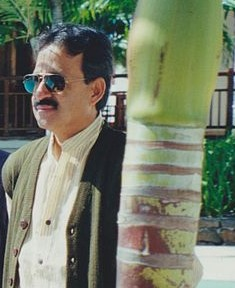
- Raashid Alvi in Malappuram, Kerela

Member of Parliament, Lok Sabha
- In office 10 October 1999 – 6 February 2004
- Preceded by: Chetan Chauhan
- Succeeded by: Harish Nagpal
- Constituency: Amroha

Member of Parliament, Rajya Sabha
- In office 3 April 2004 – 2 April 2012
- Constituency: Andhra Pradesh

National Spokesperson Indian National Congress
- In office 2011–2013

Personal details
- Born: 15 April 1956 (age 70) Chandpur, Uttar Pradesh, India
- Party: Indian National Congress
- Parent(s): Malik Irfan Ahmad Alvi; Islama Khatoon
- Education: B.Sc., LLB
- Profession: Politician, social worker, advocate

Raashid Alvi is an Indian politician who served as a member of the Indian Parliament from both the Lok Sabha and Rajya Sabha. He is currently a member of the Indian National Congress party.

== Early life ==
Raashid Alvi was born in Chandpur, Bijnor, Uttar Pradesh, on 15 April 1956, to Islama Khatoon and Malik Irfan Ahmad Alvi, a freedom fighter

== Political career ==
He served as the All India general secretary of the Janata Dal In 1999, he was elected to the Lok Sabha from the Amroha constituency in Uttar Pradesh, defeating former Test cricketer and Bharatiya Janata Party candidate Chetan Chauhan by over 90,000 votes. He had unsuccessfully contested the same seat in the 1996 elections. He served as the Parliamentary Party leader of the Bahujan Samaj Party from 1999 to 2004. He was expelled from the Bahujan Samaj Party in 2004 after he had accused party president Mayawati of working under BJP pressure and taking bribes for allotting party tickets.

He later joined the Congress party and was twice elected to the Rajya Sabha from Andhra Pradesh and served in the Indian Parliament from 2004 to 2012. He also served as an official spokesperson of the Indian National Congress. Alvi failed to get a Rajya Sabha renomination and was dropped as the party spokesperson in 2013.

== Controversies ==
In 2009, he stoked a major controversy when he said that he saw 'no reason' to celebrate the Kargil victory. "Kargil isn't a thing to be celebrated. The war was fought within our territory. We didn't even come to know when the Pakistani army crossed over and built bunkers inside our territory. It's only the NDA which may celebrate," he said. The then opposition BJP was swift to take criticize the ruling Congress over Alvi's comments. "The UPA should not think along political lines. We (BJP) celebrate every day of national importance and respect everybody, right from Pt Jawaharlal Nehru, who contributed to the country. There should be a similar approach from the Congress," said BJP leader Prakash Javadekar. National Conference leader Farooq Abdullah also opined that the issue was above party politics. "Kargil should be celebrated by everyone," he said.
