= Hargovind (disambiguation) =

Hargovind is a surname and given name. People with the name include:

- Hargovind Pant
- Hargovind Laxmishanker Trivedi
- Hargovind Bhargava
- Guru Hargovind
- Hargovind Singh
- Har Gobind Khorana
- Har Govind Singh
