= Kunwar Danish Ali =

Indian politician

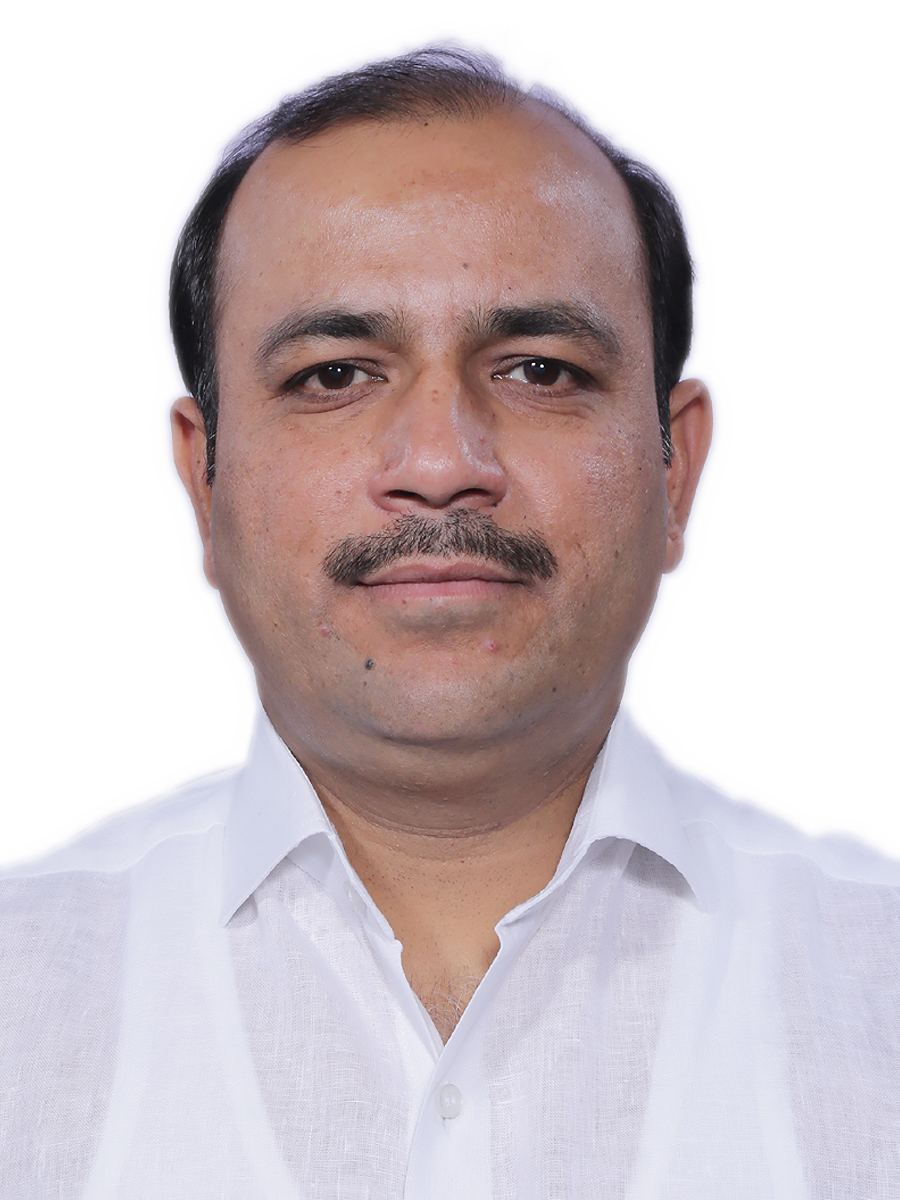

Member of Parliament, Lok Sabha
- In office 23 May 2019 – 4 June 2024
- Preceded by: Kanwar Singh Tanwar
- Succeeded by: Kanwar Singh Tanwar
- Constituency: Amroha

Leader of Bahujan Samaj Party, Lok Sabha
- In office 6 November 2019 – 13 January 2020
- Constituency: Amroha

Personal details
- Born: 10 April 1975 (age 51) Hapur, Uttar Pradesh, India
- Party: Indian National Congress (since 2024)
- Other political affiliations: Bahujan Samaj Party (2019-2023); Janata Dal (Secular) (till 2019)
- Spouse: Zubia Danish (m. 2005)
- Children: 3
- Education: Jamia Millia Islamia
- Profession: Agriculture

Kunwar Danish Ali (born 10 April 1975) is an Indian politician and a former Member of parliament, Lok Sabha for Amroha, Uttar Pradesh.

== Early life ==
Ali was born in the Muslim family of Kunwar Jafar Ali and Nafees Jafar on 10 April 1975 in Hapur. He graduated from Jamia Millia Islamia University in New Delhi. On 15 January 2005, Ali married Zubia Danish, with whom he has a son and two daughters.

== Political career ==
Ali started his political career with Janata Dal (Secular) and went on to become the general secretary of the party. On 16 March 2019, he joined Bahujan Samaj Party with the consent of Janata Dal (Secular) leader and Karnataka chief minister H.D. Kumaraswamy. Six days later, Bahujan Samaj Party announced that Ali would contest the upcoming 2019 Indian general election from Amroha constituency. On 23 May, he was elected to the Lok Sabha after defeating Kanwar Singh Tanwar of the Bharatiya Janata Party, his nearest rival by a margin of nearly 63,000 votes. Ali was polled 601,082 votes.

He was the leader of Bahujan Samaj party in Lok Sabha from 6 November 2019 - 13 January 2020. He was a member of Consultative Committee for Ministry of Home Affairs from 2019 till 2024.

Following the incident with Bidhuri, Ali met politicians like Rahul Gandhi, subsequently causing his suspension from BSP on 9 December 2023 for not following the Party line.

Ali joined Bahujan Samaj Party in March 2019 after leaving Janata Dal (Secular). On 9 December 2023, Bahujan Samaj Party suspended him for not following party line and engaging in anti-party activities.

Ali joined Indian National Congress on 20 March 2024. He contested the 2024 Indian general election from Amroha constituency as an Indian National Congress candidate. He was defeated by Kanwar Singh Tanwar of the Bharatiya Janata Party, by a margin of 28,670 votes. Ali was polled 447,836 votes.

Lok Sabha
Preceded by Kanwar Singh Tanwar	Member of Parliament for Amroha; 23 May 2019 – 4 June 2024	Succeeded by Kanwar Singh Tanwar
Party political offices
Preceded by Vacant	Leader of the Bahujan Samaj Party in the Lok Sabha; 2019 – 2023	Succeeded by Girish Chandra
