= Thompson Ishaka =

Nigerian footballer (born 2004)

Personal information
- Date of birth: November 10, 2004 (age 21)
- Place of birth: Nigeria
- Position: Left winger

Team information
- Current team: Squires Gate FC

Youth career
- Years: Team
- –2023: Brooke House College
- 2023–2025: Rangers
- 2025–: Squires Gate FC

Thompson Ishaka (born 20 November 2004) is a Nigerian footballer who plays as a left winger for Squires Gate F.C..

== Club career ==
Ishaka has been described as "caught the eye while playing for his school side... sparked interest following his 'wizard like' performances during the English Schools Football Association U18 Finals... starred for Leicester-based Brooke House College, scoring two smashing solo goals in his side's 3-1 victory over London Nautical College". Thomson was released from Rangers and signed by Squires Gate FC on 1 March 2025.

== International career ==
He represented Nigeria internationally at youth level. He was called up for a training camp for the Nigeria national under-20 football team ahead of the 2023 U-20 Africa Cup of Nations.

== Style of play ==
Ishaka mainly operates as a winger and has been described as "has operated as a centre-forward and this versatility could be a big bonus... isn’t afraid of taking the game to his opponents with a mixture of speed and guile in order to create chances... has also shown that he could adapt to different positions".
