= Sihali Jageer =

- village
- Location in Uttar Pradesh, India Sihali Jageer (India)
- Coordinates: 28°47′59″N 78°15′46″E
- Country: India
- State: Uttar Pradesh
- District: Amroha
- Founder: Pathan's

Government
  - Body: Gram panchayat

Area
  - Total: 419 km^{2} (162 sq mi)
- Elevation: 207 m (679 ft)

Population (2011)
  - Total: 9,115
  - Density: 21.8/km^{2} (56.3/sq mi)

Languages
  - Official: Hindi, English
- Time zone: UTC+5:30 (IST)
- PIN: 244241
- Vehicle registration: 7162
- Nearest city: Gajraula
- Sex ratio: 4797:4318 ♂/♀

Sihali Jageer (also known as Sihali Jagir) is a village in the Hasanpur subdistrict of the Amroha district within Jyotiba Phule Nagar in the Indian state of Uttar Pradesh. Sihali Jageer is also famous for plants Nursery .

Sihali Jageer is a gram panchayat administered by a sarpanch. The village was originally settled by Pathans, 400 years ago. Sindh Mohalla was the first Mohalla of this village which settled by two brothers, Peer Khan and Meer Khan.

== Economy ==
Sihali Jageer is known as a center of the plant nursery and horticulture industry. Fareed Khan is credited with being the first resident in the village to develop a successful nursery business, and his success inspired many other village residents to develop their own nursery businesses.

The name Sihali Jageer is also used as a trademark by a luxury ladies fashion company located in Ambedkar Nagar, Noida, Uttar Pradesh. The company was founded by a zamindar family of Amroha district named Sihali Jageer.

The Anjuman A. Ashraf Pharmacy College (located at Vill-Basi Sahsoli Post-Sihali Jagir, Tehsil-Hasanpur, Amroha, J.P. Nagar 224241) was granted the status of "Diploma institutions only for conduct" for 2019–2020.

== Demographics ==
According to 2011 census data, there were 1474 households in Sihali Jageer and a population of 9115 of which 4797 were males while 4318 were females. In 2018, its population was estimated to have grown to around 14,000 made up of 2,000 households, of which 65% were estimated to have land holdings.

The population of children in the village aged 0–6 was 1665 which constituted 18.27% of the total population of village according to the 2011 census data. The child sex ratio was 875 which was lower than the Uttar Pradesh average of 902.

Per the 2011 census data, Sihali Jageer village had a literacy rate of 58.98%, which was below the average literacy rate of Uttar Pradesh at 67.68%. The male literacy rate was 67.66%, while the female literacy rate was 49.39%.

Ashfaq Ali Khan is from Sihali Jageer.
