= Brooke House College Football Academy =

Coordinates: 52.46542°N 0.91796°W

- Founded: 2008
- Website: https://www.brookehousecollege.co.uk/

The Brooke House College Football Academy is an association football academy in Market Harborough.

Harborough Town Football Club is used for training and home matches, whilst Northampton House is home to the manager’s office and college’s fitness centre.

== History ==
The Brooke House College Football Academy was formed in 2008, with eleven initial players on the course, led by manager Ben Watts. The students, who now number over 150, study at the Brooke House College during the mornings, with a focus on football in the afternoons. Initially only accepting male applicants, the college opened its footballing programme to female footballers in 2019. Though the fees for the college can be upwards of £40,000 per year, the college offers scholarships based on footballing ability.

The Brooke House College FA has links to a number of other academies across the world, most notably the Pepsi Football Academy in Nigeria and the Right to Dream Academy in Ghana. They also have a link with former footballer Nwankwo Kanu's academy, taking one student per year.

Due to the nature of the academy's recruitment process, most of the players are unable to play in FA-affiliated leagues due to their non-UK resident status. Therefore, the academy play in friendlies against the academies of professional teams, as well as in international friendly tournaments.

In 2020, the academy entered into a partnership with the local government of Abia State in Nigeria, giving full scholarships to a number of young Nigerian footballers. The academy launched a football and education scheme alongside professional side Coventry City in 2022, offering "full time elite football" at Coventry City's under-23 side, as well as offering a degree in Sport and Exercise Science with Management. The college offered a scholarship to Thai footballer Duangphet Phromthep, who had notably survived being trapped in the Tham Luang cave rescue of 2018. However, Duangphet died just a year into his studies in England, in February 2023.

The academy has seen a number of players go on to play professionally, internationally, or both. Following the youth international debut of Brooke House College student Deniche Hill for Bermuda under-20s, who went on to join the academy of Leicester City, four other Bermudian footballers were enrolled into the academy. In February 2023, five members of the Bermuda under-17 squad for the 2023 CONCACAF U-17 Championship were alumni of the Brooke House College.

== Staff ==
The college is led by former footballer and manager Micky Adams, who works as technical director and has helped the club form links with his former club, Leicester City. Other notable staff members include Norbert Farkas and Mike Edwards, while former footballer Kirsty Linnett studied for her UEFA B licence while working at the academy.

== Notable former players ==
- Note: Players highlighted in **bold** are full internationals for the nation indicated.
- (Bermuda) **Deniche Hill**
- (Bulgaria) Nikolay Todorov
- (Bulgaria) **Petar Vitanov**
- (British Virgin Islands) **Momchil Yordanov**
- (Cayman Islands) **Jackson Kirkconnell**
- (Germany) Victor Gorgas
- (China) Xie Baoxian
- (England) Kanayo Megwa
- (Hong Kong) Brian Fok
- (Hong Kong) Kwok Tsz Kaai
- (Hong Kong) Law Chun Ting
- (Hong Kong) **Leung Nok Hang**
- (Hong Kong) **Tan Chun Lok**
- (Hungary) Gábor Szalai
- (India) Aayushmaan Chaturvedi
- (Jamaica) **Dujuan Richards**
- (Mongolia) **Khabul Baatar**
- (Nigeria) Chinonso Emeka
- (Nigeria) Thompson Ishaka
- (Nigeria) Chigozie Mbah
- (Nigeria) Jesse Sekidika
- (North Macedonia) **Agon Elezi**
- (Tanzania) **Kelvin John**
- (Ukraine) Denys Bunchukov
- (United States) Zane Okoro
