= Garhmukteshwar Assembly constituency =

Constituency of the Uttar Pradesh legislative assembly in India

Garhmukteshwar
- Constituency No. 60 for the Uttar Pradesh Legislative Assembly

Constituency details
- Country: India
- Region: North India
- State: Uttar Pradesh
- District: Hapur
- Total electors: 3,36,580(2019)
- Reservation: None

Member of Legislative Assembly
- 18th Uttar Pradesh Legislative Assembly
- Incumbent Harendra Singh Tewatia
- Party: Bharatiya Janata Party
- Elected year: 2022

Garhmukteshwar Assembly constituency is one of the 403 constituencies of the Uttar Pradesh Legislative Assembly, India. It is a part of the Hapur district and one of the five assembly constituencies in the Amroha Lok Sabha constituency. First election in this assembly constituency was held in 1957 after the Delimitation of Parliamentary and Assembly Constituencies Order 1961 (DPACO) was passed. After DPACO 2008 was passed, the constituency was assigned identification number 60.

During the 3rd Vidhan Sabha, the constituency was reserved for candidates from scheduled caste community.

In 2022, shri Harendra Singh Teotia of Bharatiya Janata Party won the seat by defeating Ravindra Chaudhary from Samajwadi Party with a margin of 26306 votes. Garhmukteshwar Assembly constituency is falling under Amroha Lok sabha constituency. Date of Polling: Thursday, 10 February 2022 Date of electoral Counting Result: Thursday, 10 March 2022

== Members of the Legislative Assembly ==
#	Term	Name	Party	From	To	Days	Comments	Ref
01	01st Vidhan Sabha	-	-	May-1952	Mar-1957	1,776	Constituency not in existence	
02	02nd Vidhan Sabha	-	-	Apr-1957	Mar-1962	1,800	Constituency not in existence	
03	03rd Vidhan Sabha	Vir Sen	Indian National Congress	Mar-1962	Mar-1967	1,828	Reserved for SC candidates	
04	04th Vidhan Sabha	Balbir Singh	Independent	Mar-1967	Apr-1968	402	-	
05	05th Vidhan Sabha	Balbir Singh	Bharatiya Kranti Dal	Feb-1969	Mar-1974	1,832	-	
06	06th Vidhan Sabha	Manzoor Ahmad	Indian National Congress	Mar-1974	Apr-1977	1,153	-	
07	07th Vidhan Sabha	Sakhawat Hussain	Janata Party	Jun-1977	Feb-1980	969	-	
08	08th Vidhan Sabha	Kunwar Virendra Singh Dhana	Indian National Congress (I)	Jun-1980	Mar-1985	1,735	-	
09	09th Vidhan Sabha	Babu Kanak Singh	Lok Dal	Mar-1985	Nov-1989	1,725	-	
10	10th Vidhan Sabha	Akhtar	Indian National Congress	Dec-1989	Apr-1991	488	-	
11	11th Vidhan Sabha	Krishanveer Singh Sirohi	Bharatiya Janata Party	Jun-1991	Dec-1992	533	-	
12	12th Vidhan Sabha	Krishanveer Singh Sirohi	Bharatiya Janata Party	Dec-1993	Oct-1995	693	-	
13	13th Vidhan Sabha	Ram Naresh Rawat	Bharatiya Janata Party	Oct-1996	May-2002	1,967	-	
14	14th Vidhan Sabha	Madan Chauhan	Samajwadi Party	Feb-2002	May-2007	1,902	-	
15	15th Vidhan Sabha	Madan Chauhan	Samajwadi Party	May-2007	Mar-2012	1,762	-	
16	16th Vidhan Sabha	Madan Chauhan	Samajwadi Party	Mar-2012	Mar-2017	-	-	
17	17th Vidhan Sabha	Kamal Singh Malik	Bharatiya Janata Party	Mar-2017	Mar-2022			
18	18th Vidhan Sabha	Harendra Singh Tewatia	Bharatiya Janata Party	Mar-2022	Incumbent			

== Election result ==
=== 2027 ===
2027 Uttar Pradesh Legislative Assembly election: Garhmukteshwar
Party	Candidate	Votes	%	±%
INDIA				
NDA				
BSP				
NOTA	None of the above			
Majority				
Turnout				
gain from		Swing		

=== 2022 ===
2022 Uttar Pradesh Legislative Assembly election: Garhmukteshwar
Party	Candidate	Votes	%	±%
BJP	Harendra Singh Tewatia	104,113	44.07	+2.99
SP	Ravindra Chaudhary	77,807	32.94	+10.93
BSP	Madan Chauhan	43,929	18.6	−6.56
AIMIM	Furqan Chaudhary	4,868	2.06	
NOTA	None of the above	818	0.35	+0.09
Majority		26,306	11.13	−4.79
Turnout		236,220	67.72	+0.42
BJP hold		Swing		

=== 2017 ===
2017 Uttar Pradesh Legislative Assembly election: Garhmukteshwar
Party	Candidate	Votes	%	±%
BJP	Kamal Singh Malik	91,086	41.08	
BSP	Prashant Chaudhary	55,792	25.16	
SP	Madan Chauhan	48,810	22.01	
Independent	Satpal Yadav	15,089	6.8	
RLD	Kunwar Ayyub Ali	5,648	2.55	
NOTA	None of the above	572	0.26	
Majority		35,294	15.92	
Turnout		221,755	67.3	
BJP gain from BSP		Swing		

=== 2012 ===
2012 Uttar Pradesh Legislative Assembly election: Garhmukteshwar
Party	Candidate	Votes	%	±%
SP	Madan Chauhan	82,816	43.31	−
BSP	Farhat Hasan	64,617	33.79	−
RLD	Ravinder Choudhary	32,467	16.98	−
	Remainder 12 candidates	11,329	5.94	−
Majority		18,199	9.52	−
Turnout		191,229	65.66	−
SP hold		Swing		

== See also ==
- Amroha Lok Sabha constituency
- Ghaziabad district, India
- Sixteenth Legislative Assembly of Uttar Pradesh
- Uttar Pradesh Legislative Assembly
