= Naya India =

- Type: Daily National newspaper
- Owner(s): Samvad Parikrama Pvt Ltd.
- Founded: 2010; 15 years ago
- Language: Hindi
- Headquarters: New Delhi
- Website: www.nayaindia.com

Naya India (Hindi: नया इंडिया), is an Indian national Hindi daily newspaper. It was founded by Hari Shankar Vyas, a political journalist, who was formerly the editor of Jansatta and currently the host-producer of the Central Hall Programmes on all ETV Hindi news channels. Naya India was launched on 16 May 2010 from Delhi and is at present published from ten Hindi speaking states.

== About the Editor ==
Mr. Hari Shankar Vyas is the Chief Editor and also the publisher of Naya India. With a rich and diverse experience of 35 years as a journalist, he has become a noted figure in contemporary Hindi Journalism. Starting in the 80s, as part of the core launch team of Jansatta, in the 90s he ventured into publishing and producing TV programmes. His Central Hall show on ETV's all Hindi Channels has had a huge impact not just with the political class of Northern India but is widely watched by the masses. His uninterrupted weekly column Gupshup of 30 years is also one of the oldest and most widely read Political column in Hindi (from Jansatta to Punjab Kesari to Naya India) as well as in English (The Sunday Pioneer). With a desire to fulfill the vacuum the Hindi speaking population feels/ has felt, Mr. Vyas ventured into newspaper publishing, thus creating Naya India.

== Editions ==
NAYA INDIA is published from ten locations—Delhi, Jaipur, Lucknow, Bhopal, Chandigarh, Shimla, Dehradun, Ranchi, Patna and Raipur.

== Contributors ==
- Hari Shankar Vyas
- Ved Pratap Vaidik
- Shruti Vyas
- Balbir Punj
- Satyendra Ranjan
- Ajeet Dwivedi
- Vinamra
- Shambunath Shukla
- Shirish Chandra Mishra
- Sushant Kumar
- Tanmay Kumar
- Sandeep Singh
- Nishant Shekhar
- Ajit Kumar
- Chankyashree
- Abhinav Shrivastava
- Shashank Rai
- Ajay Sethiya
