= Kamal Singh Malik =

Indian politician

Kamal Malik कमल सिंह मलिक

MLA, 17th Legislative Assembly
- In office 2017–2022
- Preceded by: Madan Chauhan
- Constituency: Garhmukteshwar

Personal details
- Born: 1 February 1966 (age 60) Moradabad
- Party: Bharatiya Janata Party
- Parent: Late Shri Ramkumar Singh (father)
- Profession: Businessman & politician
- Website: http://facebook.com/drkamalmalik/

Kamal Singh Malik (कमल सिंह मलिक, Born: 1 February 1966) is an Indian politician and a member of the 17th Legislative Assembly of Uttar Pradesh of India. He represents the Garhmukteshwar constituency of Uttar Pradesh and is a member of the Bharatiya Janata Party political party.

== Early life and education ==
He was born in February 1966 in a Farmer Family of Lodhipur, a village in Moradabad district. From childhood he is the active Swayamsevak of Rashtriya Swayamsevak Sangh. He has completed his M.A. from M. J. P. Rohilkhand University First division (university Topper) and also awarded PhD in Geography.
