= Deniche Hill =

Bermudian footballer (born 2004)

Personal information
- Date of birth: 11 March 2004 (age 22)
- Place of birth: Hamilton Parish, Bermuda
- Height: 1.73 m (5 ft 8 in)
- Positions: Midfielder; left-back; forward

Team information
- Current team: FC Halifax Town
- Number: 16

Youth career
- Hamilton Parish
- 2020–2022: Brooke House College
- 2022–2025: Leicester City

Senior career*
Years	Team	Apps	(Gls)
2025–2026	Buxton	23	(0)
2026–	FC Halifax Town	6	(0)

International career^{‡}
2021	Bermuda U20	3	(0)
2022–	Bermuda	15	(0)
- * Club domestic league appearances and goals as of 12:08, 11 November 2026 (UTC) ‡ National team caps and goals as of 12:08, 11 November 2026 (UTC)

Deniche Hill (born 11 March 2004) is a Bermudian professional footballer who plays as a forward for FC Halifax Town and the Bermuda national team.

== Club career ==
Hill started his career with Hamilton Parish in his native Bermuda, before a move to England, where he went on trial with Huddersfield Town in 2019. He went on to join the Brooke House College the following year.

He was spotted by scouts from Premier League side Leicester City while representing Bermuda, and was invited to trial with the club in the summer of 2022. He signed his first contract with the club in December 2022, having featured in a number of games for the under-21 squad.

== International career ==
Having represented Bermuda at under-20 level in qualification for the 2022 CONCACAF U-20 Championship, he was called up to the senior squad in January 2023. He made his debut in a 0–0 draw against Haiti in June 2022.

== Personal life ==
Hill is the son of former Bermudian international footballer Corey Hill.

== Career statistics ==
=== International ===
As of match played 10 June 2025

Appearances and goals by national team and year
National team	Year	Apps	Goals
Bermuda	2022	1	0
Bermuda	2023	3	0
Bermuda	2025	2	0
Total		6	0
