= Madan Chauhan =

Indian politician (born 1956)

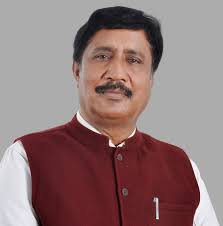

MLA, Uttar Pradesh Legislative Assembly
- In office Feb 2002 – Mar 2017
- Preceded by: Ram Naresh Rawat
- Succeeded by: Kamal Singh Malik
- Constituency: Garhmukteshwar

Personal details
- Born: 15 July 1956 (age 70) Village Madaarpura Tehsil Sardhana Meerut
- Party: Bharatiya Janta Party
- Education: Chaudhary Charan Singh University
- Profession: Businessperson, politician

Madan Chauhan is an Indian politician and a member of the 16th Legislative Assembly of Uttar Pradesh of India. He formerly represented the Garhmukteshwar constituency of Uttar Pradesh and was a member of the Samajwadi Party political party. In 2024, he joined the Bharatiya Janta Party (BJP).

== Early life and education ==
Madan Chauhan was born in Meerut . He attended the Chaudhary Charan Singh University and attained Bachelor of Commerce degree.

== Political career ==
Madan Chauhan has been an MLA for three straight terms. He represented the Garhmukteshwar constituency and is a member of the Samajwadi Party political party. He was state minister of entertainment department. He was in charge (prabhari) of Lalitpur district, Lalitpur. In 2022 Assembly Elections, he has been fielded by Bahujan Samaj Party (BSP) from Garhmukteshwar constituency.

== Posts held ==
#	From	To	Position	Comments
01	2002	2007	Member, 14th Legislative Assembly	
02	2007	2012	Member, 15th Legislative Assembly	
03	2012	2017	Member, 16th Legislative Assembly	In charge of Lalitpur district.

== See also ==
- Garhmukteshwar
- Sixteenth Legislative Assembly of Uttar Pradesh
- Uttar Pradesh Legislative Assembly
