= Vasant Valley School =

Private high school in Delhi, India

Coordinates: 28.5334°N 77.1441°E

- New Delhi, India

Information
- Motto: Excellence in Deed
- Established: June 1990
- Chairperson: Rekha Purie
- Principal: Sharmila Bakshi
- Head of Senior School: Vijay Trivedi
- Head of Junior School: Mona Datta
- Enrollment: approximately 1300
- Founder's Day: 18 November
- School Colours: Maroon and Beige
- Website: www.vasantvalley.org

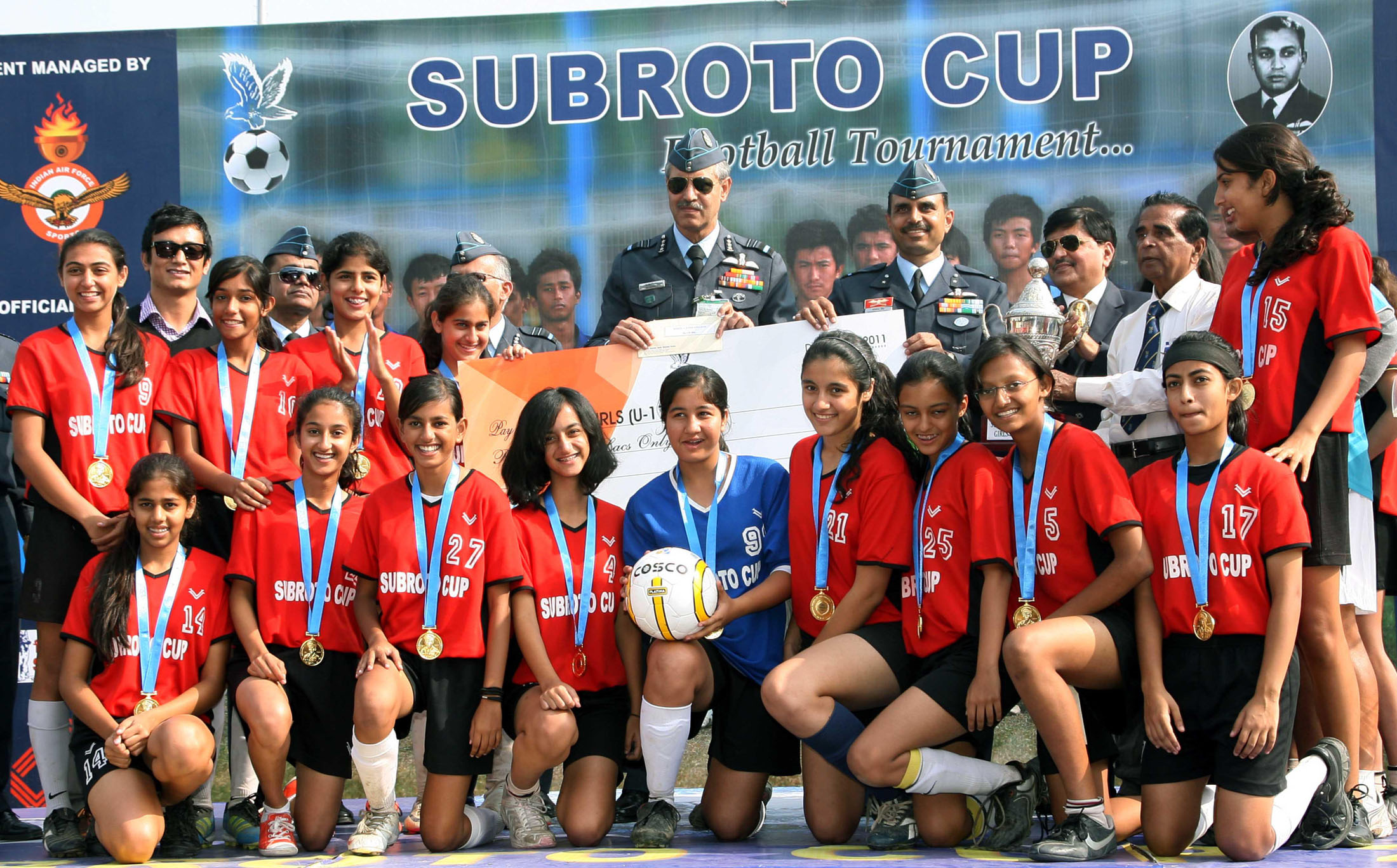
The Vice Chief of Air Staff, Air Marshal K.K. Nohwar with the winning team (Girls U-17) of Vasant Valley School, Vasant Kunj, during the Closing Ceremony of Subroto Cup Football Tournament – 2011

Vasant Valley School is a co-educational private high school in Vasant Kunj, Delhi, India.

After its inception, the school accepted students in July 1990, up to class 4. The school added a new grade each year as the classes graduated to the next level.

The first graduating class of Vasant Valley completed 12 grades under the CBSE syllabus in May 1999. The school began with Arun Kapur as its director, a former housemaster at The Doon School and an alumnus of St. Stephen's College, Delhi.

The school offers CBSE and IGCSE curriculum. The IGSCE curriculum was introduced in 2022 for classes 9 and 10, and AS and A levels for 11 and 12.

== History ==
The school was founded by Aroon Purie and Rekha Purie.

== Principals and Headmasters ==
Below are the names of some of the principals of the school:

- 1990 - 2020 : Arun Kapur (Headmaster)
- 1998 - 1999 : Ranu Dattagupta (Principal)
- 2000 - 2006 : Peilu Oberoi (Principal)
- 2006 - 2025 : Rekha Krishnan (Principal)
- Current : Sharmila Bakshi (Principal)

== Infrastructure ==
The school is spread across eight acres of land in Vasant Kunj. It has two main buildings - senior school and junior school. Senior School consists of classrooms for classes 6 to 12. Junior School consists of classrooms for Foundation to 5. Some of the major facilities in the school include-

- Alcoves - The areas in front of every grade. It is utilized to serve food and for inter-section activities and competitions.
- Centre Stage - The central stage used for joint assemblies and major performances.
- Class Act area - The area for the junior school class act.
- Conference Rooms - The place for important meetings, talks and student council work. The school has one conference room which can be divided into two separate rooms.
- Design Centre - The hub for all Visual Arts lessons and senior school dispersal.
- Jhoola Badis - A playground for all kids from Foundation to 2nd grade.
- Sports infrastructure - Facilities for athletics, badminton, basketball, cricket, football, gymnastics, squash, table tennis, and tennis.
- Vasant Manch - The air-conditioned auditorium used for senior school acts and other activities.
- Quadrangles - The open area in each building used for assemblies, performances and as a place for children to roam around during breaks.

Apart from these the school includes two sick rooms, five staff rooms, five labs, and a playroom. The school infrastructure has been supported by various alumni and parents. In 2023, the squash courts were renovated and air-conditioning was installed in all classrooms with contributions from alumni and parents.

== Student governance ==
The student body in the school is organized in the following ways-

1. Houses - The students and teachers are divided in four houses : Blue, Green, Red and Yellow. These houses compete in various inter-house competitions, such as Mathematics, Dance, and Football, throughout the year.
2. Councils - The school has councils for environment, library, outreach, areas of development, arts, and sports. The councils organize various events and competitions in their respective areas. The members of each council are selected by the head of the council.
3. Prefect Council - This includes prefects of each house, council heads, and school captains of classes 5 and 12. All prefects, and school captains are chosen by teachers.

From classes 3 onwards each class has a class representative. Class representatives make the student council.

== Notable alumni ==
- Tanvie Hans - ex-player at Tottenham Hotspur L.F.C. and poster-girl for Gurinder Chadha's Bend It Like Beckham the Musical
- Roshni Nadar - Executive Director and CEO of HCL Technologies
- Prayaag Akbar — Journalist and academic

== See also ==
- List of schools in Delhi
