= Sangeeta Chauhan =

Indian politician

Member of 17th Uttar Pradesh Assembly
- In office 10 November 2020 – 12 March 2022
- Preceded by: Chetan Chauhan
- Succeeded by: Samarpal Singh

Personal details
- Born: 22 March 1959 (age 67) Delhi, India
- Party: Bharatiya Janata Party
- Spouse: Chetan Chauhan

Sangeeta Chauhan (born 22 March 1959) is an Indian politician who served as Member of 17th Uttar Pradesh Assembly from Naugawan Sadat Assembly constituency on behalf of Bharatiya Janata Party. She is the first lady as MLA of Naugawan Sadat constituency.

== Personal life ==
She was born on 22 March 1959 in Delhi. She married Chetan Chauhan on 30 January 1992.
