= Kanwar Singh Tanwar =

Indian politician

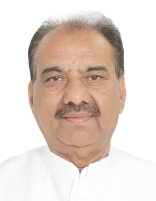

Member of parliament, Lok Sabha
- Incumbent
- Assumed office 4 June 2024
- Preceded by: Kunwar Danish Ali
- In office 2014–2019
- Preceded by: Devendra Nagpal
- Succeeded by: Kunwar Danish Ali
- Constituency: Amroha

Personal details
- Born: 21 January 1961 (age 65) Delhi, India
- Party: Bharatiya Janata Party
- Children: 5
- Parent: Rajwati Tanwar (m. 1977)
- Occupation: Businessman, politician
- As of 17 December, 2016

Kanwar Singh Tanwar (born 21 January 1961; Hindi pronunciation: [kə̃ʋəɾ sɪŋgʱ t̪ə̃ʋəɾ]) is an Indian politician who is serving as Member of Parliament from Amroha constituency in Uttar Pradesh. He is a member of Bharatiya Janata Party.

== Early life ==
Tanwar was born on 21 January 1961 to Hukum Chand Tanwar and Narani Devi in Asola of South Delhi district. He studied till 8th standard in Govt. Boys School Fatehpur, New Delhi in 1973. He married Rajwati Tanwar on 10 November 1977, with whom he has four sons and a daughter.

== Political career ==
Tanwar was elected to the 16th Lok Sabha in May 2014. From 1 September 2014, until 2019, he held membership on the Standing Committee on Health and Family Welfare and the Consultative Committee for the Ministry of Health and Family Welfare. Tanwar served as a Permanent Special Invitee on the Consultative Committee for the Ministry of Rural Development, Panchayati Raj, and Drinking Water and Sanitation, where he contributed to policy discussions and decision-making processes.

In May 2019 Lok Sabha election, Tanwar lost the Amroha seat to Bahujan Samaj Party candidate Kunwar Danish Ali by a margin of nearly 63,000 votes. Tanwar was polled 5,37,834 votes. In the 2024 Lok Sabha election, Tanwar regained the seat with 476,506 votes. He defeated Ali, an Indian National Congress candidate, by 28,670 votes.
