= Ashfaq Ali Khan =

Indian politician

MLA, 16th Legislative Assembly
- In office Mar 2012 – Mar 2017
- Preceded by: None
- Succeeded by: Chetan Chauhan
- Constituency: Naugawan Sadat

Personal details
- Born: 19 September 1968 (age 57) Sihali Jageer, Uttar Pradesh
- Party: Rashtriya Lok Dal
- Other political affiliations: Samajwadi Party
- Spouse: Reshma Praveen (wife)
- Parent: Ashraf Ali (father)
- Education: LLB
- Alma mater: Lucknow University
- Profession: Agriculturist; Lawyer; Politician

Ashfaq Ali Khan is an Indian politician and he was a member of the 16th Legislative Assembly of Uttar Pradesh of India. He represents the Naugawan Sadat constituency of Uttar Pradesh and now he is a member of the RLD political party.

== Early life and education ==
Ashfaq Ali Khan was born in Sihali Jageer, Uttar Pradesh. He attended Lucknow university and attained Bachelor of Laws degree.

== Political career ==
Ashfaq Ali Khan has been a MLA for one term. He represented the Naugawan Sadat constituency and was a member of the Samajwadi Party political party. He lost the election in 17th Assembly Election in Uttar Pradesh from Rashtriya Lok Dal ticket.

== Posts held ==
#	From	To	Position	Comments
01	2012	Mar-2017	Member, 16th Legislative Assembly	

== See also ==
- Naugawan Sadat
- Sixteenth Legislative Assembly of Uttar Pradesh
- Uttar Pradesh Legislative Assembly
