= Denys Bunchukov =

Ukrainian footballer (born 2003)

Personal information
- Full name: Denys Olehovych Bunchukov
- Date of birth: 20 June 2003 (age 23)
- Place of birth: Kyiv, Ukraine
- Height: 1.76 m (5 ft 9 in)
- Position: Midfielder

Team information
- Current team: FC Džiugas
- Number: 8

Youth career
- 2013–2018: Dynamo Kyiv
- 2018–2019: Arsenal Shchaslyve
- 2019: Atlet Kyiv
- 2020–2021: Brooke House College
- 2022: Seraing

Senior career*
Years	Team	Apps	(Gls)
2022–2023	Seraing	7	(0)
2022–2023	Seraing U23	13	(1)
2023–2024	URSL Visé	32	(3)
2024–2025	Belisia Bilzen	28	(0)
2025–	Džiugas	40	(6)

International career^{‡}
2022	Ukraine U21	1	(0)
- * Club domestic league appearances and goals as of 1 September 2026 ‡ National team caps and goals as of 09:59, 26 April 2023 (UTC)

Denys Olehovych Bunchukov (Ukrainian: Денис Олегович Бунчуков; born 20 June 2003) is a Ukrainian footballer who plays as a midfielder for Lithuanian Džiugas Club.

== Early life ==
Bunchukov was born in Kyiv.

== Club career ==
Bunchukov joined the academy of Ukrainian side Dynamo Kyiv at the age of ten, and spent five years with the club. After falling out of favour with Dynamo's youth coaches, he left the club and moved on to Arsenal Shchaslyve and Atlet Kyiv, spending short spells with each before moving to England in 2020 to enrol at the Brooke House College, playing for their representative football team. Having failed to secure a professional contract in England, he unsuccessfully trialled at Belgian sides Eupen, URSL Visé and Union in summer 2021, before another unsuccessful trial at Standard Liège later the same year.

The following February, he returned to Belgium to trial with Seraing. While on trial, the Russian invasion of Ukraine escalated the Russo-Ukrainian War in his native Ukraine, and he was given refugee status by the Belgian government, giving him an allowance of €1,100 a month, while Seraing did not have to offer him a contract. He made his debut with Seraing in a 4–0 home loss to Genk on 27 August 2022, playing 69 minutes before being replaced by Valentin Guillaume.

In July 2025 removed to Lithuanian Džiugas Club. On 27 July 2025 he made his debut against FK Sūduva.

== International career ==
Bunchukov was called up to the Ukraine under-21 squad for friendlies against Israel and Georgia in November 2022, going on to make his debut against the latter.

== Career statistics ==
=== Club ===
As of 12 January 2024.

Appearances and goals by club, season and competition
Club	Season	League			Cup		Other		Total	
Club	Season	Division	Apps	Goals	Apps	Goals	Apps	Goals	Apps	Goals
Seraing	2022–23	Jupiler Pro League	7	0	1 (Note: Appearances in the Belgian Cup)	0	0	0	8	0
Seraing U23	2022–23	Belgian Division 2	13	1	–		0	0	13	1
Seraing U23	2023–24	Eerste Nationale	17	1	3	0	0	0	20	1
Career total			37	2	4	0	0	0	41	2
