= Samarpal Singh =

Member of the Uttar Pradesh Legislative Assembly

Samarpal Singh Dhariwal

Member of the Uttar Pradesh Legislative Assembly
- Incumbent
- Assumed office March 2022
- Preceded by: Sangeeta Chauhan
- Constituency: Naugawan Sadat
- In office December 1993 – October 1995
- Constituency: Moradabad West

Personal details
- Born: 20 January 1957 (age 69) Bheda Bharatpur, P.O. KARAUNDI, Naugawan Sadat, Amroha, Uttar Pradesh, 244236
- Party: Samajwadi Party
- Spouse: Usha Kaur
- Children: Prateek Dhariwal
- Parent: Sardar Singh (father)
- Education: Mahatma Jyotiba Phule Rohilkhand University
- Occupation: Agriculture, Lawyer
- Profession: Politician

Samarpal Singh Dhariwal is an Indian politician and a member of the Samajwadi Party, a social democratic political party primarily based in Uttar Pradesh, India. He is a member of the 12th and 18th Legislative Assembly of Uttar Pradesh, representing the Naugawan Sadat Assembly constituency of Uttar Pradesh.

== Early life ==
Samarpal Singh Dhariwal was born in a Jat family of Dhariwal gotra to Sardar Singh in Uttar Pradesh, India. He did his graduation from Mahatma Jyotiba Phule Rohilkhand University, Bareilly, in 1981, and LLB from Kedar Nath Girdharilal Khatri PG College Moradabad in 1985.

== Political career ==
In the 2022 Uttar Pradesh Legislative Assembly election, Samarpal represented Samajwadi Party from the Naugawan Sadat Assembly constituency and defeated Devendra Nagpal of the Bharatiya Janata Party by a margin of 6540 votes.

== Posts held ==
| # | From | To | Position | Comments |
|---|---|---|---|---|
| 01 | 2022 | Incumbent | Member, 18th Legislative Assembly | |
| 02 | 1993 | 1995 | Member, 12th Legislative Assembly | Moradabad West, Janta Dal |

== See also ==
- 18th Uttar Pradesh Assembly
- Uttar Pradesh Legislative Assembly
- Naugawan Sadat Assembly constituency
