= Tanvie Hans =

British footballer

Personal information
- Full name: Tanvie Hans
- Date of birth: 19 July 1990 (age 36)
- Place of birth: Delhi, India
- Position: Midfielder

Team information
- Current team: Misaka United
- Number: 8

Youth career
- Eves Soccer Academy

College career
Years	Team	Apps	(Gls)
2011–2012	Exeter University Ladies		

Senior career*
Years	Team	Apps	(Gls)
2013–2015	Tottenham Hotspur		
2015	Fulham		
2017–2018	Sethu		
2018–2021	Bangalore United		
2019–2021	Parikrama	12	(0)
2022–2024	Misaka United	18	(4)
2024–2025	Pass FC	7	(0)
2025–	Misaka United	10	(0)
- * Club domestic league appearances and goals

Tanvie Hans is an Indian-born British professional footballer who plays as a midfielder for Misaka United in the Karnataka Women's League. She also plays for Karnataka women's football team. She previously played for English clubs Tottenham Hotspur and Fulham, and later appeared with Sethu and Bangalore United in the Indian Women's League.

== Personal life ==
Born in Delhi to Punjabi parents, Hans attended Vasant Valley School, which was the first school in Delhi to introduce an all-girls football team. She later went to Jesus and Mary College of the Delhi University in Delhi. She holds British citizenship through her British-Indian mother who hails from London. She then moved to the United Kingdom to pursue studies and also played university football for Exeter University. Later in 2019, she began the process of acquiring Indian citizen (Hans already holds an Overseas Citizenship of India).

I have always had a heart for India and I was few of the very fortunate ones who got to play in England at pretty decent levels. I have always considered it a privilege and responsibility to give back to the country that invested in my dream. I also know for a fact that if a difference can be made by me, it can be made over here in India. But it's never easy and it is a lot of work. I was restricted from playing for India because of my British citizenship and I am in the process of converting my citizenship to Indian. It's not an easy procedure and I'm trying very hard. Hopefully, 2019 is my year and I can be a part of Indian football here on.

— Tanvie Hans, on her dream of representing the India women's national team.

Hans also appeared in a supporting role in the Tamil-language sports action drama film Bigil. She played the role of Hemam, the captain of the rival Manipur team, which played the final against Tamil Nadu.

== Club career ==
=== United Kingdom ===
Hans began her professional club career in the UK. After a few trials, she packed her bag to play football for FA Women's Super League side Tottenham Hotspurs Women in 2013. She later moved to Fulham L.F.C. in 2015, that competes in the London and South East Women's Regional Football League.

=== India ===
After stints in England, Hans moved back to India with her parents, both Indians, she broke the boundaries, as she began to compete in The Amateur League (TAL) in Bengaluru, a competition that is predominantly played by men.

She later signed with Sethu FC and appeared in the 2017–18 Indian Women's League season. Her exploits brought her to Bengaluru when she sported the colours of Parikrama FC for two seasons from 2019, before being roped in by Bangalore United FC for the 2021–22 season.

Hans also attended a couple of national camps of the India national team, but never appeared with The Blue Tigresses due to having British passport.

Hans was appointed the captain of the Karnataka women's football team for the 2021–22 edition of the Rajmata Jijabai Trophy held at Kerala. She joined the Misaka United FC which plays in the Karnataka Women's League for the 2022–23 season.

== Honours ==
Misaka United

- Karnataka Women's League runner-up: 2022–23, 2025–26

== Filmography ==
Year	Title	Role	Notes
2019	Bigil	Hemam (Manipur captain)	

== See also ==
- List of Indian football players in foreign leagues
- List of people from Delhi
