= Ram Bahadur Rai =

Indian journalist (born 1946)

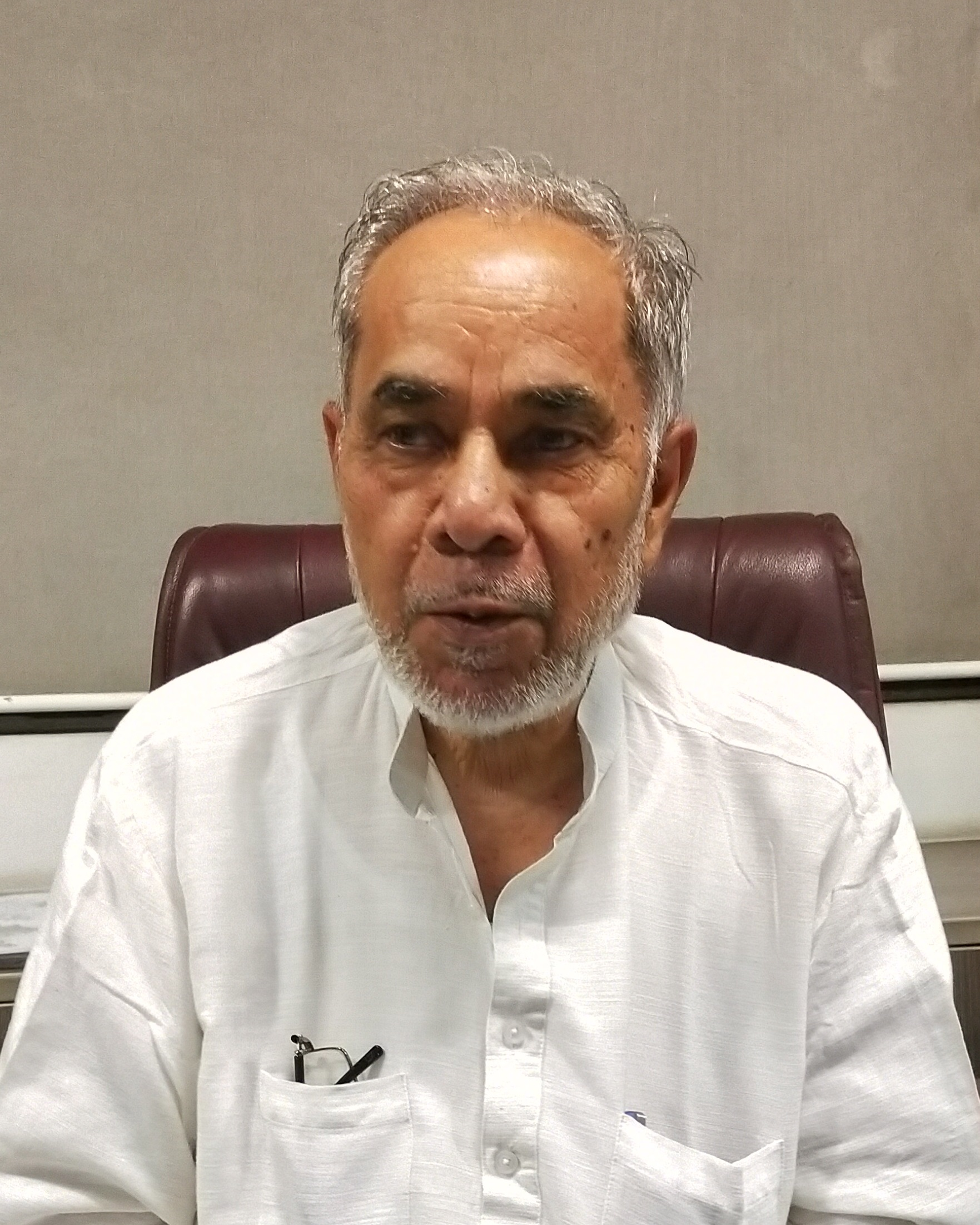
- Ram Bahadur Rai in his office
- Born: 1 July 1946 (age 80); Sonari, Ghazipur, Uttar Pradesh
- Education: Banaras Hindu University
- Occupations: Journalist, editor
- Years active: 1971-present

Ram Bahadur Rai is an Indian journalist and the former news editor of Hindi daily Jansatta. He has published and authored and edited several of books. He is known for some impressive biographies, written in Hindi, namely Shashwat Vidrohi Rajneta based on life and acts of Gandhian socialist Acharya J. B. Kripalani, Rahvari ke Sawal on Chandrashekhar and Manjil se Jyada Safar on V P Singh. He was a close associate of the Indian freedom fighter and political leader Jayaprakash Narayan and was also part of a Steering Committee of JP Movement.

In January 2025, Shri Ram Bahadur Rai was conferred with India's third-highest civilian award, the Padma Bhushan.

== Early life ==
He was born on 1 July 1946 in Sofonari . He got his early education at his native place and nearby Machhti Inter College. For higher education he moved to Varanasi and completed his graduation from Banaras Hindu University. He got his postgraduate degree in economics from BHU. He obtained PG diploma in mass communication from Rajasthan University.

In the year 1965 on the behest of central government academic council of BHU proposed to drop 'Hindu' word from the name of the university. Ram Bahadur Rai led a student movement to oppose this move which was shelved after rising protest. However Ram Bahadur Rai was expelled from the university for leading the protest. To continue as a regular student an apology was asked by the university administration but Rai refused. As a result, he couldn't complete his Ph.D. in economics.

Being the organising secretary of Akhil Bharatiya Vidyarthi Parishad Ram Bahadur Rai led the student movement during JP movement.

== Career ==
Ram Bahadur Rai started his career as journalist with Hindustan Samachar. He wrote eyewitness account of Bangladesh Liberation War for Hindi Daily Aaj, published from Varanasi. Later on he moved to Delhi and started working journalist with Hindi daily Jansatta. At Jansatta he worked as Bureau Chief and News Editor. For a short span of time he worked as special correspondent for Navbharat Times also. At present he is working as group editor of Hindusthan Samachar.

In the year 2015 Government of India appointed Ram Bahadur Rai as the president of Indira Gandhi National Centre for the Arts (IGNCA) executive committee.

=== First person to be jailed during emergency ===
Rai was the first person to be jailed, in 1974, under the Maintenance of Internal Security Act,(MISA). This act was passed by the Indira Gandhi government in 1973, giving dictatorial powers to law enforcement agencies, and repealed by the subsequent Janata Party Government in 1977. He was again jailed for eighteen months.

=== Organiser of JP movement ===
Ram Bahadur Rai served as one of the key member of the steering committee of JP movement. Rai played an important role during student movement of 1974. It was Ram Bahadur Rai under whose leadership students' leaders of many organisations met JP and requested him to lead the movement.

== Books Authored ==
- Shaswat Vidrohi Rajneta Acharya J.B. Kripalani, National Book Trust, 2016.
- Bharatiya Samvidhan: Ankahi Kahani (The Untold Story of India's Constitution), Prabhat Prakashan, 2021.
- Rahbari ke Sawal (Sakshatkar with Chandrashekhar), Rajkamal Prakashan, 2018.
- Manzil se Zyada Safar, Rajkamal Prakashan, 2006.

== Position held and awards ==
- He was awarded Padma Shri, the fourth highest civilian award of India, in 2015.
- Patron, Integrated Talent Development Mission (ITDM)
- President of the 20 member board of Indira Gandhi National Centre for the Arts (IGNCA).
- Madhavrao Sapre National Journalism Award
- Manikchandra Vajpayi National Journalism Award
- Bhagwandas Journalism Award
- Satyagrahi Samman
- Jagadguru Ramanandacharya Award

== See also ==
- Jayaprakash Narayan
