= Xie Baoxian =

Chinese association football player

Personal information
- Date of birth: 9 January 1997 (age 29)
- Place of birth: Shenzhen, Guangdong, China
- Height: 1.73 m (5 ft 8 in)
- Position: Midfielder

Team information
- Current team: Shenzhen Juniors
- Number: 10

Youth career
- 2016: Brooke House College

Senior career*
Years	Team	Apps	(Gls)
2018–2020	Shenzhen FC	2	(0)
2020	Guangzhou R&F	0	(0)
2020	→ Guangxi Pingguo Haliao (loan)	0	(0)
2021	Sichuan Minzu	14	(2)
2022–	Shenzhen Juniors		
- * Club domestic league appearances and goals

Xie Baoxian (simplified Chinese: 谢宝贤; traditional Chinese: 謝寶賢; pinyin: Xiè Bǎoxián; born 9 January 1997) is a Chinese footballer currently playing as a midfielder for Shenzhen Juniors.

== Club career ==
Xie studied at the Brooke House College in England in 2016. Having returned to his native China, Xie joined Shenzhen FC in 2018. He was promoted to the senior team in the 2018 China League One season, but he would have to wait until 12 May 2019 to make his debut, which was in a league game against Beijing Guoan F.C. that ended in a 3-0 defeat.

Following an unsuccessful loan spell at Guangxi Pingguo Haliao from Guangzhou R&F, where he made no appearances, and a stint with China League Two club Sichuan Minzu, he joined Shenzhen Juniors in July 2022, helping them earn successive promotions from the Shenzhen Super League, Chinese Champions League and China League Two.

== Personal life ==
As well as football, Xie also has an interest in Esports, and has represented Shenzhen in FIFA tournaments.

== Career statistics ==
As of 31 December 2025.

Appearances and goals by club, season and competition
Club	Season	League			Cup (Note: Includes the Chinese FA Cup)		Other		Total	
Club	Season	Division	Apps	Goals	Apps	Goals	Apps	Goals	Apps	Goals
Shenzhen FC	2018	China League One	0	0	1	0	–		1	0
Shenzhen FC	2019	Chinese Super League	2	0	0	0	–		2	0
Shenzhen FC	Total		2	0	1	0	0	0	3	0
Guangzhou R&F	2020	Chinese Super League	0	0	0	0	–		0	0
Guangxi Pingguo Haliao (loan)	2020	China League Two	0	0	0	0	–		0	0
Sichuan Minzu	2021	China League Two	14	2	3	0	–		17	2
Shenzhen Juniors	2022	Shenzhen Super League	?	?	–		–		?	?
Shenzhen Juniors	2023	CMCL	?	0	–		–		?	0
Shenzhen Juniors	2024	China League Two	23	1	2	0	–		25	1
Shenzhen Juniors	2025	China League One	27	1	2	0	–		29	1
Shenzhen Juniors	Total		50	2	4	0	0	0	54	2
Career total			66	4	8	0	0	0	74	4
