= Vineet Vohra =

Indian street photographer

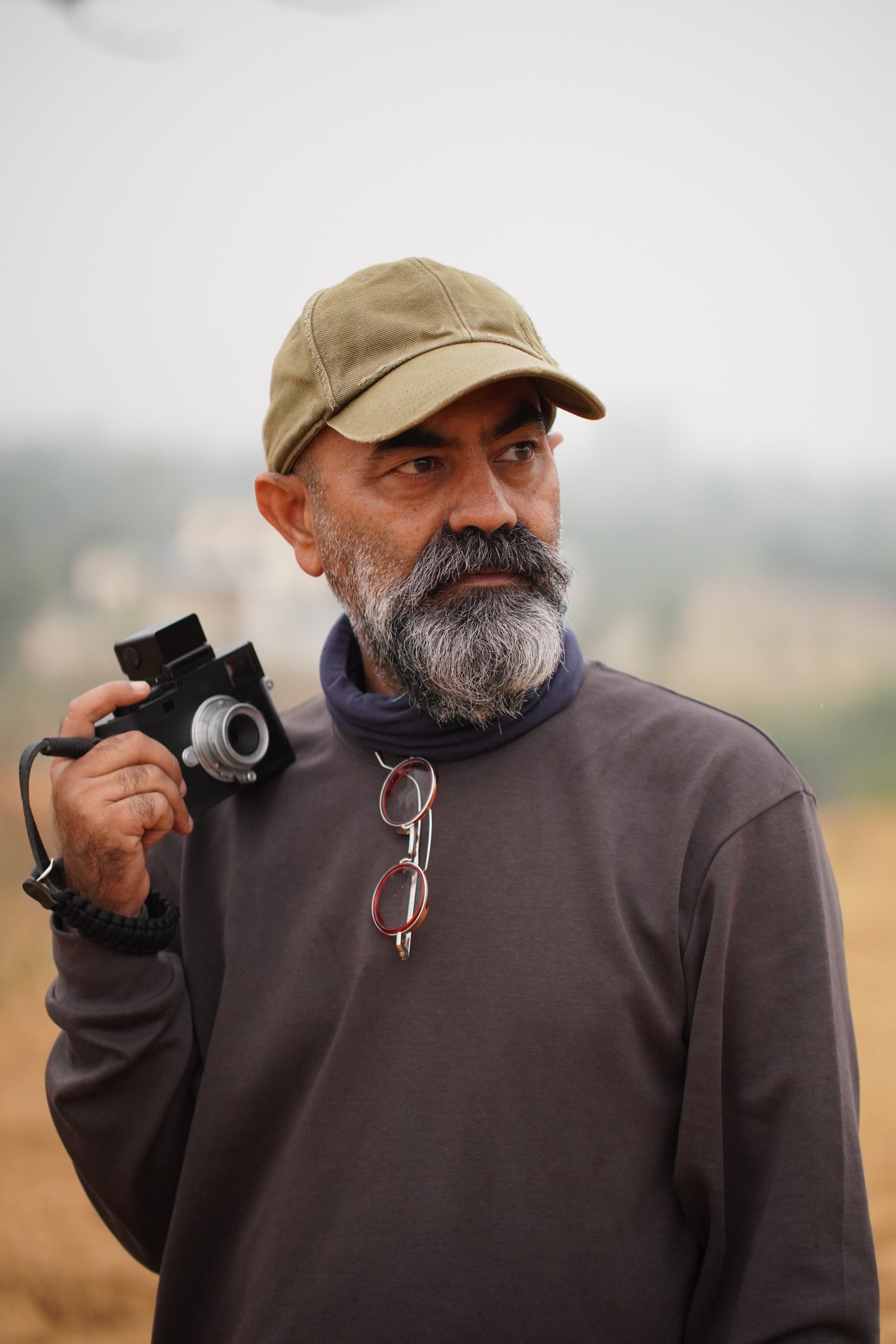
- Born: 02 November 1973 (age 52); New Delhi, India
- Occupation: Street photographer
- Years active: 2001–present

Vineet Vohra (born 2 November 1973) is an Indian street photographer. He is also nominator for LOBA (Leica Oskar Barnack Award).

== Early life and career ==
Vohra was born on 2 November 1973 in New Delhi. He has completed his fine art degree in College of Art, Delhi.

In 2001 he started street photography and his works were published in many publications including National Geographic, UNESCO and The Guardian. Then in 2011 he founded a photography magazine called "APF". In 2015 he became the first Indian to become a Leica ambassador.

Currently he is Vivo ambassador.

== Books ==
- Serendipity 1st edition - ISBN 9791280238009
- Serendipity 2nd edition
- Along the Way - ISBN 9798989036356
- Chiiz - ISBN 9788193566473
