= Har Govind Singh =

Indian politician

Member of Parliament, Lok Sabha
- In office 1989–1991
- Preceded by: Ram Pal Singh
- Succeeded by: Chetan Chauhan
- Constituency: Amroha

Personal details
- Born: 6 January 1935 Sirsa Mohan,Moradabad district, United Provinces, British India(present-day Uttar Pradesh, India)
- Died: 29 January 1997
- Party: Janata Dal
- Spouse: Somvati Devi
- Children: Kushal Kumar,Dr Rahul,Atal Kumar and late Anil Kumar

Har Govind Singh was an Indian politician. He was elected to the Lok Sabha, the lower house of the Parliament of India, as a member of the Janata Dal.
