= Chetan Chauhan =

Indian cricketer (1947–2020)

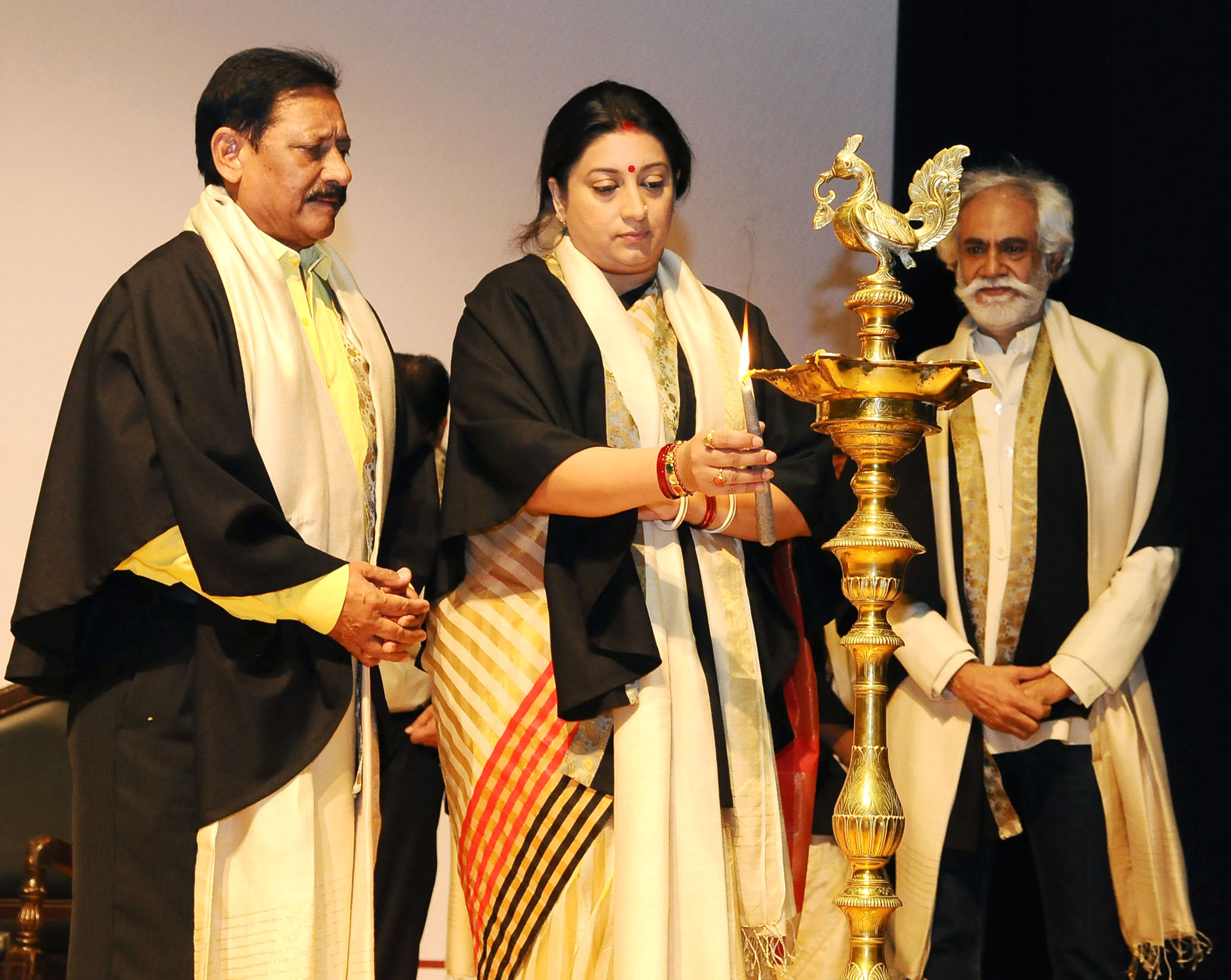
- Chetan Chauhan with The Union Minister for Textiles, Smt. Smriti Irani lighting the lamp at the convocation ceremony of the National Institute of Fashion Technology (NIFT), in New Delhi.

Member of the Uttar Pradesh Legislative Assembly
- In office 24 February 2017 – 16 August 2020
- Preceded by: Ashfaq Ali Khan
- Succeeded by: Sangeeta Chauhan

Member of Parliament of the Lok Sabha
- In office 1991–1998
- Preceded by: Har Govind Singh
- Succeeded by: Raashid Alvi
- Constituency: Amroha

Personal details
- Born: 21 July 1947 Bareilly, United Provinces, British India (now in Uttar Pradesh, India)
- Died: 16 August 2020 (aged 73) Gurugram, Haryana, India
- Cause of death: Cardiac arrest after COVID-19
- Citizenship: Indian
- Party: Bharatiya Janata Party
- Spouse: Sangeeta Chauhan
- Education: Wadia College, Pune, Maharashtra
- Awards: Rajiv Gandhi Khel Ratna (1984)
- Cricket career

Cricket information
- Batting: Right-handed
- Bowling: Right-arm off spin
- Role: Opening batsman

International information
- National side: India
- Test debut (cap 118): 25 September 1969 v New Zealand
- Last Test: 13 April 1981 v New Zealand
- ODI debut (cap 24): 1 October 1978 v Pakistan
- Last ODI: 15 February 1981 v New Zealand

Domestic team information
- Years: Team
- 1967/68–1974/75: Maharashtra
- 1975/76–1984/85: Delhi

Career statistics
Competition	Test	ODI	FC	LA
Matches	40	7	179	26
Runs scored	2084	153	11,143	617
Batting average	31.57	21.85	40.22	24.68
100s/50s	0/16	0/0	21/59	0/4
Top score	97	46	207	90
Balls bowled	174	0	3,536	36
Wickets	2	–	51	1
Bowling average	53.00	–	34.13	26.00
5 wickets in innings	0	–	1	0
10 wickets in match	0	–	0	0
Best bowling	1/4	–	6/26	1/26
Catches/stumpings	38/–	–	189/–	6/–
- Source: CricketArchive, 30 September 2008

Chetan Pratap Singh Chauhan (21 July 1947 – 16 August 2020) was a cricketer who played 40 Test matches for India. He played Ranji Trophy for Maharashtra and Delhi. Chauhan played most of his international cricket in the late 1970s and was the regular opening partner of Sunil Gavaskar during that period. Chetan Chauhan was appointed Chairman of NIFT (National Institute of Fashion Technology) from June 2016 to June 2017. He was also twice elected to the Lok Sabha from Amroha in Uttar Pradesh, in 1991 and 1998. From 2018 to 2020, he was minister for youth and sports in the state of Uttar Pradesh, India.

On 12 July 2020, he was admitted to hospital after testing positive for COVID-19. He died due to complications and multiple organ failure on 16 August 2020 at the age of 73.

== Early days ==
Chauhan was born in Uttar Pradesh in a Hindu Rajput family. The family moved to Pune in Maharashtra in 1960 where Chauhan's father, an army officer, was transferred. He took his bachelor's degrees at Wadia College in Pune. There he was coached by the former Maharashtra player Kamal Bhandarkar. Chauhan represented Pune University in the Rohinton Baria Trophy in 1966–67 and was selected to represent West Zone for the interzonal Vizzy Trophy in the same season. He scored 103 against North Zone and 88 & 63 against South Zone in the final. His opening partner in the second innings was Sunil Gavaskar.

More success in the Vizzy trophy in 1967 led to his selection in the Maharashtra Ranji team. Chauhan's first hundred came next year when he was first in and last out against Bombay on a rain affected wicket where the first six wickets fell for 52. He scored 103 against South Zone in the Duleep Trophy final against five Test bowlers and was selected to play for India in 1969–70.

== Test cricket ==
Chauhan made his Test debut against New Zealand at the Bombay. He took 25 minutes to score his first run, a square cut for four off Bruce Taylor. His next scoring shot was a hook for six off the same bowler. Chauhan was dropped after two Tests, made an appearance against Australia later in the season, failed, and was dropped again for three years.

Chauhan scored 873 runs in the 1972–73 Ranji season for Maharashtra which was then the second highest aggregate for a season. This included double hundreds in consecutive matches against Gujarat and Vidarbha. Chauhan and Madhu Gupte shared an opening stand of 405 in the latter match. In between the double hundreds, he played two Tests against England. He failed and did not play a Test for another five years.

He moved to Delhi and the North Zone in 1975. One appearance against Sri Lanka in an unofficial Test ended in failure. In 1976–77, he scored 158 against Haryana (with a fractured jaw), 200 v Punjab, 147 v Karnataka and 150 against the Central Zone. Another Duleep trophy hundred early in the next season found him a place in the team to Australia.

== Comeback ==
Chauhan scored 157 against Victoria in his first match of the tour. It took him 516 minutes and included just two fours. Paul Hibbert of Victoria had scored a hundred earlier in the match without a single boundary. Chauhan returned to the Indian team for the second Test at Perth and hit 88 in his very first innings. From then he missed only one Test until the end of his career and, except for one occasion, opened with Gavaskar every time. At Lahore against Pakistan they added 192, and 117 & 153 against West Indies at Bombay.

In England in 1979, they put on 213 in the second innings at The Oval when India missed the target of 438 by nine runs. Against Australia in 1980–81, Chauhan scored 249 runs in three Tests to Gavaskar's 118. He missed a hundred by three runs in Adelaide. At Melbourne in the next Test, he scored 85 and added 165 with Gavaskar before the latter was given out lbw to Dennis Lillee. Gavaskar, the captain, disputed the decision on the way out and ordered Chauhan to leave the field with him. An embarrassing situation was avoided when the Indian manager Wing Cmdr. Shahid Durrani persuaded Chauhan to return. Touring New Zealand after the trip to Australia, Chauhan scored 78 in the second Test and 36 & 7 in the third.

== Later years ==
Chauhan was dropped after the tour and never selected for another Test match. He added 3022 runs with Gavaskar in their 59 opening stands, ten of which were over 100. He scored 2084 runs in his career with 16 fifties but without a century. His last first class match was the Ranji final against Bombay in 1985 where he scored 98 and 54 with a fractured finger. He also served as the Cricket coach of Indian team.

Chauhan received the Arjuna award in 1981.

== Career in politics ==
Chauhan was a member of the Bharatiya Janata Party. He was a member of the Lok Sabha (lower house of the parliament) from Amroha in 1991 and 1998. He lost the elections from the same constituency in 1996, 1999 and 2004, finishing fourth on the last occasion. He then also made his comeback in the politics by defeating Alley Hasan of Bahujan Samaj Party in 1998 General Elections by defeating him by more than 35,000 votes. In 2017 he was elected to Uttar Pradesh Vidhan Sabha from Naugawan Sadat and made a minister in Chief Minister Yogi Adityanath's government.

== Accomplishments ==
- Chauhan was the first Test cricketer to finish his Test career with over 2000 runs but without a century. As of 25 September 2025, Shane Warne (3154 runs) and Tim Southee (2245 runs) are the only other retired players with a similar record.
- Chauhan had 11 century stands with Gavaskar but one of them was for the fourth wicket. At Bombay against the West Indies in 1978–79 they opened together, but Chauhan retired early in the innings and came back at the fall of the third wicket.

== Death ==
In July 2020, Chauhan tested positive for COVID-19 during the COVID-19 pandemic in India, and a month later he was placed on a ventilator following multiple organ failure. On 16 August 2020, he died in Gurugram at the age of 73.

== Sources ==
- Sujit Mukherjee, Matched Winners, Orient Longman (1996), p 105-119
- Indian Express, 26 September 1969

Lok Sabha
Preceded by Har Govind Singh	Member of Parliament for Amroha; 1991 – 1996	Succeeded by Pratap Singh Saini
Preceded by Pratap Singh Saini	Member of Parliament for Amroha; 1998 – 1999	Succeeded by Raashid Alvi
