= Baoxian (nun) =

- Born: 401
- Died: 477 (aged 77)
- Occupation: Buddhist nun

Baoxian (Chinese: 寶賢, 401–477) was a Buddhist nun who was the first rector general of the assembly of nuns of Jiankang, capital of Liu Song China. She was the first woman to fill that office over multiple convents in Chinese history.

== Life ==
Baoxian, whose secular surname was Chen and given name is unknown, was born in 401. Her family hailed from the Chen Commandery in the valley of the Huai River in modern Henan Province. She became a Buddhist nun in 420 at Jian'an Convent in Jiankang and was known for her piety and observance of the monastic rules (vinaya). The Emperor Wen and his son, Emperor Xiaowu, both donated food, clothing, and money in her honor. Another son of Emperor Wen, Emperor Ming, placed her in charge of Puxian Convent in 465 and then appointed her as rector general of the assembly of nuns of Jiankang in 466.

In 474, her authority was challenged after a celebrated master of monastic rules from Dunhuang lectured on the Sarvastivada Monastic Rules in Ten Recitations and a group of attendees wished to rededicate themselves to the precepts of their order. Baoxian initially refused their request but then allowed it, provided that the nuns confess any breaches of the vinaya. The confessions were passed on to the office of the assembly which would then appoint someone to further investigate the nuns to see if they were suitable candidates if it approved of what they had confessed to. This had the effect of reinforcing the doctrinal orthodoxy of the nuns as all unsuitable nuns were expelled. Baoxian died three years later at the age of 77.
