= Harendra Singh Tewatia =

Indian politician

Member of the 18th Uttar Pradesh Legislative Assembly
- Incumbent
- Assumed office 2022
- Constituency: Garhmukteshwar

Personal details
- Party: Bhartiya Janata Party
- Education: Master of Arts
- Alma mater: Kanpur University

Harendra Singh Tewatia is an Indian politician from Uttar Pradesh. He is grandchild of Chaudhary Charan Singh, The 5th Prime Minister of India. He is currently Member of 18th Uttar Pradesh Legislative Assembly from Garhmukteshwar Assembly constituency. He's a member of the Bhartiya Janata Party. A party that follows the Philosophy of Integral Humanism
