= Nitin Soni =

Indian poet

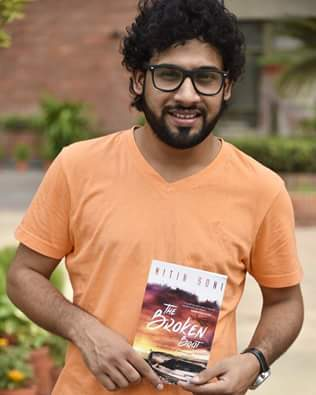
- Born: Nitin Soni; New Delhi, India
- Education: Zakir Husain College; University of Delhi
- Occupations: Writer, Poet
- Writing career
- Genres: Poetry, Short story
- Notable work: The Broken Boat (2016)

Nitin Soni is an Indian poet and author, based in New Delhi, known for his best selling poetry book The Broken Boat, published by Authorspress in 2016. The Broken Boat reached the #1 best selling poetry book slot Amazon India during 2016. He is lyricist of The Kalam Anthem, dedicated to former president APJ Abdul Kalam, co-written by Srijan Pal Singh. He is also working for underprivileged children.

== Books ==
=== Poetry collection ===
- The Broken Boat (2016)

=== Anthology ===
- 40 Under 40: An Anthology of Post-Globalisation, 2016
- Shades of Suffering: Crumpled Voices, 2015
- Rudraksha - When Gods Came Calling, 2015
- UPPER CUT : Change India Initiative, 2014
- Crumpled Voices - Shades of Suffering, 2014
- Syahi, 2014
- My Dazzling Bards, 2014
- The Significant Anthology, 2014
- Scaling Heights : An Anthology of Contemporary Indian English Poetry, (2013)
- Aatish: Sensitizing Sentient Sentiments, 2013

== See also ==
- Indian English Poetry
- List of Indian writers
- List of Indian poets in English
