= Ishaq Sambhali =

Indian politician

- Portrait of Ishaq Sambhali

Parliament of India, Lok Sabha
- In office 1967–1970
- Constituency: Amroha

Parliament of India, Lok Sabha
- In office 1971–unknown
- Constituency: Amroha

Personal details
- Born: 6 October 1921 Thanabhawan, Muzaffarnagar, Uttar Pradesh
- Died: 15 January 1999 (aged 77)
- Party: Communist Party of India
- Spouse: Najma Begum
- Children: 4
- Education: Darul Uloom Deoband, University of Lucknow

Ishaq Sambhali (also known with his honorific Maulana) was an Indian politician, freedom activist, journalist and the member of parliament from Amroha parliamentary constituency of Uttar Pradesh. He was imprisoned twice during the independence movement of India. He was associated with Communist Party of India, and served as the parliament member twice during the 4th Lok Sabha and 5th Lok Sabha elections.

== Politics ==
Sambhali received his political education at Darul Uloom Deoband and University of Lucknow. He was initially associated with the Indian National Congress, the Kisan Mazdoor Praja Party and the Praja Socialist Party, and served as general secretary of the Congress in 1937 and Congress Committee Deoband in 1945. He was imprisoned twice during the Indian independence movement. Ashfaq was organising secretary of All India National Solidarity Council in 1963 and secretary of All India Peace Council in 1967. From 1968 to 1971, he served member of the Jamiat Ulema-e-Hind Uttar Pradesh.

== Personal life ==
Sambhali was born on 6 October 1921 in the Thanabhawan town of Muzaffarnagar. He was born to Ahmad Hassan, and was married to Najma Begum in June 1953. He had two daughters and two sons.
