= Hari Shankar Vyas =

Indian journalist and newspaper editor

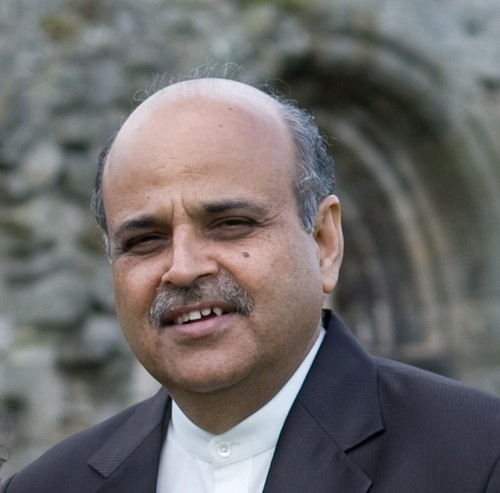
- Born: 15 September 1956
- Occupation: Hindi Journalist
- Spouse: Rajrani vyas

Hari Shankar Vyas (born 15 September 1956) is an Indian journalist, and the Chief-editor and publisher of Naya India, a daily national Hindi newspaper. He is also the consultant for ETV's Hindi channels since 2009. He started anchoring-producing five-day weekly programme for ETV Network Hindi Channels since Feb 2009. He writes a daily column "Apen to Kahege" for Naya India and weekly column Gupshup. which appears every Sunday in different Hindi newspaper. as well as English newspaper, the Sunday Pioneer. Prior, he served 13 years as editor, news of the Jansatta. Since the times of Jansatta, he has been writing a Sunday column titled GUPSHUP, both in Hindi and in English (from Jansatta to Punjab Kesari to Naya India, The Sunday Pioneer). The 35-year-old column has in the past graced the pages of many regional newspapers. His columns bring forward to the readers the ringside view of the contemporary Indian Politics.

== Early life and career ==
Hari Shankar Vyas initially did his schooling in Bhilwara (Rajasthan). After completion of Graduation, he started writing articles, columns from December 1976 while studying in JNU. First Article was published in Dec 1976 on Dainik Hindustan's editorial page. Immediately he started writing in many Magazines, newspaper like Navneet, Sarita, Mukta, BhuBarati, Hindustan, NBT. He got his first break in Nai Duniya, where the then editor Mr. Rajendra Mathur gave him to write a weekly column on international affairs called Pradesh. Also, at that time he had a regular column of viswa parikrama in Ravivar magazine. After freelancing for some time, he was selected by the Navbharat times Editor-in-Chief S. H.Vatsyayan 'Agyeya' as a trainee Journalist in 1978. After spending few months at Mumbai as a trainee and gaining experience in Madhuri(film journalism) Dharmug, he left Bennett, Coleman and Co to return to Delhi to pursue his interest in political reporting and writing. In 1979, he started his own feature agency Samvad Parikrama. Immediately more than 60 newspaper became its subscribers. From Indore's Nai Duniya to Nagpur's Navbharat, Kolkatta Vishwamitra were subscriber of Hari Shankar Vyas syndicated features and columns. At the time when Rajendra Mathur, became the Editor of Nav Bharat times in Delhi (Oct 1982), he gave Hari Shankar a columns named Vichar to write.

== Hindi journalism ==
=== Jansatta ===
He started his career with Jansatta, the Hindi newspaper of the Indian Express group in the 1980s. In 1983, he got called to work for Indian Express group's project of Hindi newspaper Jansatta. Shri Prabash Joshi (at that time the resident editor of Indian Express, Delhi) appointed Hari Shankar as the first appointee (on 15 May 1983) for Jansatta (which was launched in November 1983) as an assistant editor cum special correspondent at the age of 26. Thereby, Hari Shankar Vyas became the senior member of the core launching team which conceived new idiom, layout and style sheet for Indian Express group's first Hindi newspaper Janatta. He became the heart and soul of Jansatta by giving to its readers a colloquial Hindi in political writing and content with the objective of making it a mass-based newspaper.

He managed the bureau for National Politics and Governments as well as worked as an assistant editor for writing editorial, and editorial page articles. Soon after he was promoted to editor, News, Jansatta. During the times of Jansatta, he started a column titled "GUPSHUP" (Nov 1983), which had set a unique trend becoming the only requisite source of political information.

=== Hindi computing and publishing ===
After leaving Jansatta in 1995, he started a media establishment under the name of Samvad Parikrama Pvt ltd. The firm heralded the first business affairs programme in Hindi on Doordarshan titled Karobarnama. The company also published and printed the first computer magazine in Hindi, Computer Sanchar Soochna, which was launched by the then Prime Minister H D DevGowda which was hailed as yeoman's service to the language segment. Under the editorship of Hari Shankar, the company also published a fortnightly magazine, Rajniti, which was rich with articles on the Indian polity. Since inception he has been very vocal and aggressive in using Hindi computing and promoting Hindi in the multilingual IT arena. In 1999, Hari Shankar Vyas promoted a mission which provided computer training in Hindi. Multilingual computer training programmes were launched across North India to encourage the use of Indian languages in IT. C-DAC, a government of Indian society, utilized the same channels for promoting its IT education programmes in northern India with the backup of Hari Shankar's Computer Sanchar Soochna magazine. . He envisioned a unique project of multilingual Indian portal long time ago, and when nobody could dare to think of it, he started a multilingual portal. It encompassed 15 languages with an effort to bring the masses to the Internet, thereby revolutionizing the very concept of localization of Internet in Indian languages. This first multilingual portal was called netjaal.com and it was inaugurated by then HRD minister Dr. Murali Manohar Joshi in 1998. However the mission to facilitate IT in Hindi and Indian language could not be carried forward due to .com bust. Therefore, the venture was passed onto Reliance Infocom.

=== Central Hall ===
Just before the 2009 Lok Sabha elections he started a programme titled Central Hall for all Hindi ETV channels. The half an hour show brings to the viewers a ringside view of the everyday political-social-economic life of the country. During the 2014 Lok Sabha election, Narendra Modi chose Central Hall and Hari Shankar Vyas for his first media interview.

=== Naya India ===
In 2010, to fill a vacuum in the Hindi-speaking population regarding a quality serious newspaper, Hari Shankar Vyas launched a quality Hindi newspaper. The newspaper titled Naya India soon established a unique niche in the market.

== Travel/Association ==
In his years of active journalism, he has been the member of the Hindi Advisory Board of the Railway Board and has also been the member of the Telephone Advisory Board. Also extensively covered many international and bilateral conferences/ meetings as part of the delegation traveling with various Indian Prime Ministers.
