= Hiten Noonwal =

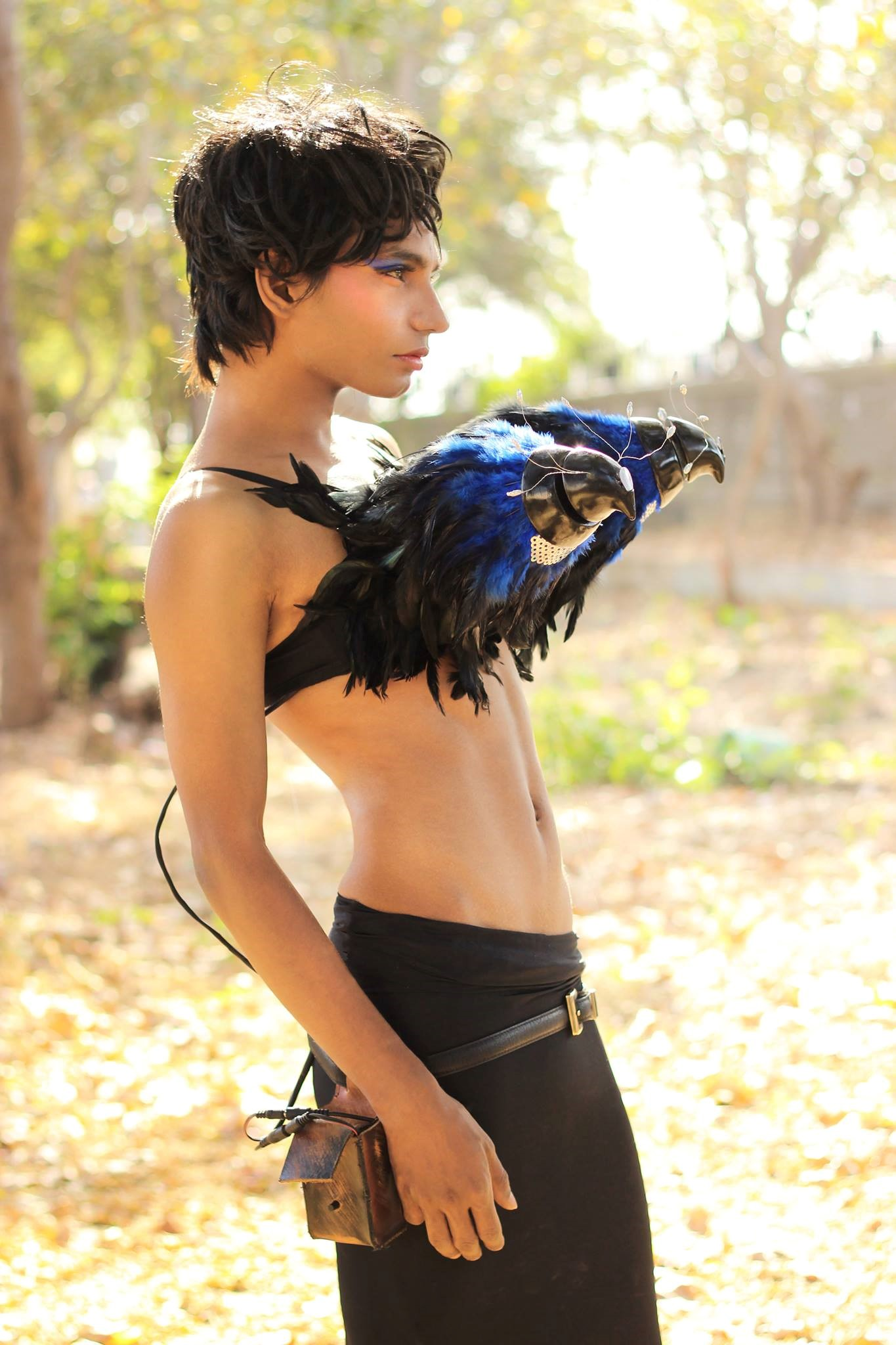
- Noonwal in 2014
- Born: Delhi
- Education: Masters in Apparel/Fashion Design from NID
- Alma mater: NID
- Known for: Dancer, drag artist, fashion designer

Hiten Noonwal is an Indian performance artist, design educator, cosplayer, and fashion designer known for their avant-garde style.

Hiten has performed more than 800 dance shows across the world and has conducted design and gender sensitization workshops. Hiten specializes in oriental belly dance and performs to express themselves; they are well-known for their performance presentations on flow movements. Hailing from an orthodox family in a small town, Hiten had faced many difficulties in presenting their art without their family knowing of it. Hiten identifies as gender fluid.

Hiten has previously worked as a fashion designer at Ritu Kumar and assistant designer at Raw Mango. They earned a Masters in Apparel/Fashion Design from National Institute of Design, Ahmedabad and is an LGBTQ+ Influencer. The documentary Nothing But a Human covers Noonwal's life.
