= Kartik Kumra =

Indian designer and fashion businessman

- Born: 2000 (age 25–26)
- Education: University of Pennsylvania (B.A.)
- Occupations: Fashion designer; businessman
- Organization(s): Founder and Artistic Director of Kartik Research
- Awards: Time 100 Next 2025

Kartik Kumra (born 2000) is an Indian fashion designer. He is most known for his fashion company Kartik Research, which centers traditional Indian crafts. He founded the company during COVID, when he was home in India. He was a semifinalist for the LVMH Prize in both 2023 and 2026. In 2025, he was named to the Time 100 Next list for his fashion designs.

== Biography ==
Kumra was raised in Delhi. As a teenager, he collected and resold sneakers from brands such as Supreme. He enrolled in the University of Pennsylvania to study economics.

In 2020, during the pandemic, he decided to design his own garments, and using money saved from his sneaker reselling, traveled thousands of miles around India to meet with dyers, weavers, embroiderers, and wood-block printers, building a network of 50 craftsmen. He then launched Kartik Research, which focused on hand-spun, hand-embroidered, and naturally dyed fabrics with a strong emphasis on heritage. It had its first pop-up store in New York in 2022, and made its runway debut at Paris Fashion Week in 2025. That same year, he opened up his brand's first Manhattan store after a previous Delhi store. He had another show in 2026 in Paris amidst challenges due to newly set United States import tariffs.

His designs have been worn by many influential people, including Paul Mescal, Stephen Curry, Lewis Hamilton, Riz Ahmed and Joe Jonas. Zohran Mamdani wore a custom eri silk tie designed by Kumra at his mayoral inauguration.

He was a semifinalist for the LVMH Prize in both 2023 and 2026. He was named to the Time 100 Next in 2025 and his profile was written by Asma Khan.
