= Devendra Nagpal =

Member of Parliament

Member of Parliament, Lok Sabha
- In office 15th Lok Sabha.
- Constituency: Amroha, Uttar Pradesh.

Personal details
- Born: 1 January 1971 (age 55) Moradabad, Uttar Pradesh, India
- Party: Bharatiya Janata Party
- Other political affiliations: Rashtriya Lok Dal
- Education: K.G.K. PG College, Moradabad.
- Profession: Social worker, politician.
- Committees: Member of two committees

Devendra Nagpal (born January 1, 1971) is an Indian politician and was the Member of Parliament of the 15th Lok Sabha of India. He represents the Amroha constituency of Uttar Pradesh and was a member of the Rashtriya Lok Dal political party.

== Early life and education ==
Devendra Nagpal was born in Moradabad district in the state of Uttar Pradesh. He holds a graduate degree from K.G.K. PG College, Moradabad. By profession, Nagpal is a social worker.

== Political career ==
Nagpal is a first time M.P. He succeeded Harish Nagpal who was an independent M.P. in the 14th Lok Sabha. Prior to becoming M.P., Nagpal was also a member of Zila Panchayat and later a Member of Uttar Pradesh Legislative Assembly.

=== Expulsion from RLD ===
In June 2013, Nagpal along with another fellow M.P., Sarika Devendra Singh Baghel was expelled from Rashtriya Lok Dal by the party president Ajit Singh. They were expelled on account of anti-party activities. Ajit Singh had asked the two M.P.s to give clarification and also had stated that the party will move against them in the Lok Sabha under the anti-defection law.

== Posts held ==
#	From	To	Position
01	2000	2005	Member, Zila Panchyat
02	2002	2007	Member, Uttar Pradesh Legislative Assembly
03	2009	2014	Member, 15th Lok Sabha
04	2009	2014	Member, Committee on Industry
05	2009	2014	Member, Committee on Petitions
06	2015	____	MD, Nagpal Public School, Gajraula

== See also ==
- 15th Lok Sabha
- Politics of India
- Parliament of India
- Government of India
- Rashtriya Lok Dal
- Amroha (Lok Sabha constituency)
