= Harish Nagpal =

Indian politician

Member of Parliament
- In office 2004-2009
- Constituency: Amroha

Personal details
- Born: 3 August 1964 (age 61) J.P. Nagar, Uttar Pradesh
- Party: Independent
- Spouse: Anjula Nagpal
- Children: 2 daughters,1son
- As of 21 September, 2006

Harish Nagpal (born 3 August 1964) is an Indian politician for the Amroha (Lok Sabha Constituency) in Uttar Pradesh.
