= Włodawianka Włodawa =

Polish football club

MLKS Włodawianka Włodawa
- Full name: Miejski Ludowy Klub Sportowy Włodawianka Włodawa
- Founded: 15 March 1923; 103 years ago
- Ground: MOSiR
- Capacity: 1,200
- Chairman: Arkadiusz Gaj
- Manager: Arkadiusz Gaj
- League: Regional league Chełm
- 2025–26: 7th of 14
- Website: MLKS Włodawianka Włodawa on Facebook
colours

MLKS Włodawianka Włodawa is a Polish professional football club based in Włodawa, Lublin voivodeship. As of the 2026–27 season, the club compete in the Chełm group of the regional league.

== History ==
Włodawianka Włodawa was founded in 1923 alongside ŻKS Makabi Włodawa and KS 30 PAP (the sports association of the 30th Artillery Regiment). The club played its inaugural match on 26 May 1923, against ŻKS Makabi Włodawa for the title of Włodawa Champions. Up until 1939, the club only contested matches against its two other town rivals.

In its early years the club was initially named Klub Sportowy we Włodawie, then KS Sokół Włodawa, before settling on Włodawia in 1924.

During World War II the club's activities were disrupted to be continued in the 1950s with the reestablishment of a club named KS Związkowiec and finally the current name of Włodawianka Włodawa in 1956.

During the 2017–18 season the club was forced to withdraw from the IV Liga after just four games. The following season the local authority took over the running of the club reentering the IV Liga in the place of local side Eko Różanka. The club finished the 2018/2019 season in 11th place.

== Colours and badge ==
Włodawianka's colours are red and blue.

== Stadium ==
Włodawianka plays their home matches at MOSiR, the municipal stadium in Włodawa.

== Supporters ==
In 2023, on the centenary of the club's foundation, local fans announced the formation of a new club Piwniczanka Włodawa as an April Fools.
