= Naugawan Sadat =

Nowgawan Sadat Nougaon Sadat
- Town (Vidhan Sabha)
- Location in Uttar Pradesh, India
- Coordinates: 28°59′N 78°25′E
- Country: India
- State: Uttar Pradesh
- District: Amroha
- Established: Between 820 A.H. and 948 A.H. (1417 AD-1541 AD) Predecessor Muhammad Atif Nadeem
- Founder: Molana Syed Jalal-uddin Abidi and Molana Syed Fakhruddin Abidi

Government
  - Type: Elected member

Area
  - Total: 3.1 km^{2} (1.2 sq mi)

Population (2018)
  - Total: 56,493
  - Density: 10,000/km^{2} (26,000/sq mi)
- Time zone: UTC+5:30 (IST)
- Postal code: 244251
- Vehicle registration: UP 23

Naugawan Sadat is a town and Tehsil in Naugawan Sadat & Amroha district in the Indian state of Uttar Pradesh.

== Demographics ==
As of 2001 India census, Nowgawan Sadat had a population of 27,075. Males constituted 52% of the population and females 48%. Nowgawan Sadat has an average literacy rate of 84%, higher than the national average of 59.5%: male literacy is 91%, and female literacy is 51%. Children under six are 18% of the population. Nowgawan Sadat is dominated by Jats, Yadavs and Muslims. The constituency has 2.76 lakh voters, of which 95,000 are Muslims, 65,000 Jats, 590 Yadavs and 25,000 from Scheduled Castes. The constituency has an equal number of fragmented Gurjar and Chauhan voters.

Farming, specifically mango cultivation, and weaving are the primary industries in the area. Many residents and families have migrated to other parts of India and to other countries in search of work.

== Schools in Nowgawan Sadat ==
>-Sahas Degree College
>-SAM Inter College
>-Shohrat Inter College
>-Askary Task College
>-Shohrat ITI
>-Fatima Girls Inter College
>-Sakina Primary School
>-Madarsa Babul Ilm
>-Madarsa Jamia Tul Muntazar
>-Madarsa Jamia Aliya Jafariya
>-Madarsa Ansar ul Uloom
>-Madarsa Noorul Madaris Junior High School
>-Madarsa Abdul Shakoor Islamia Arbia
>-Abbas Public School
>-Madarsa Sahara Public School
>-JTM Primary School
>-Abidi School
>-Fareedi Memorial Inter College
>-Kanya Junior High School
