= COVID-19 pandemic in India =

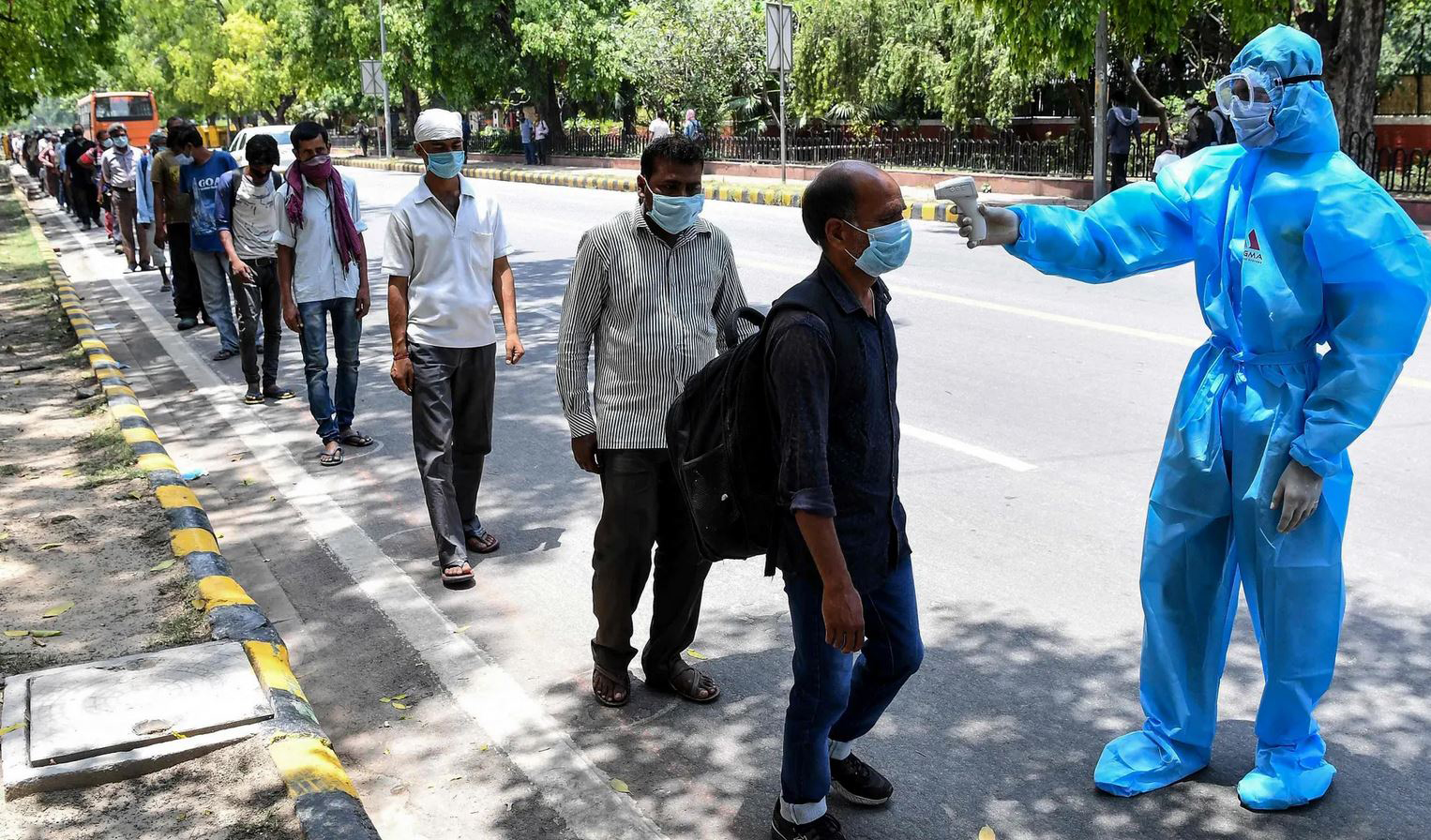
- Health checks during the COVID-19 pandemic in India, June 2020
- Disease: COVID-19
- Pathogen: SARS-CoV-2
- Location: India
- First outbreak: Wuhan, Hubei, China
- Index case: Thrissur, Kerala; 10°31′39″N 76°12′52″E
- Date: 30 January 2020 – ongoing (6 years, 9 months, 3 weeks and 2 days)
- Confirmed cases: 45,056,221
- Suspected cases: >848,400,000 (>70% of India's population, 2021 estimate)
- Recovered: 42,604,881
- Deaths: 533,849 (official count) >4,700,000 (early 2022 WHO estimate)
- Fatality rate: 1.18%
- Territories: 28 states and 8 union territories
- Vaccinations: 1,027,438,900 (total people vaccinated); 951,990,500 (people fully vaccinated); 2,206,868,000 (vaccine doses given)

Government website
- www.mohfw.gov.in www.mygov.in/covid-19

The COVID-19 pandemic in India is a part of the COVID-19 pandemic. COVID-19 is caused by SARS-CoV-2. As of 22 November 2026, according to Indian government figures, India has the second-highest number of confirmed cases in the world (after the United States) with 45,056,221 reported cases of COVID-19 infection and the third-highest number of COVID-19 deaths (after the United States and Brazil) at 533,849 deaths. In October 2021, the World Health Organization estimated 4.7 million excess deaths, both directly and indirectly related to COVID-19 to have taken place in India. Multiple studies, using several different sources of data and methods, have found similarly large estimates of excess deaths in India. These deaths were distributed unequally - marginalized social groups and women were more likely to have been impacted compared to privileged social groups and men.

The first cases of COVID-19 in India were reported on 30 January 2020 in three towns of Kerala, among three Indian medical students who had returned from Wuhan, the epicenter of the pandemic. Lockdowns were announced in Kerala on 23 March, and in the rest of the country on 25 March. Infection rates started to drop in September. Daily cases peaked mid-September with over 90,000 cases reported per-day, dropping to below 15,000 in January 2021. A second wave beginning in March 2021 was much more devastating than the first, with shortages of vaccines, hospital beds, oxygen cylinders and other medical supplies in parts of the country. By late April, India led the world in new and active cases. On 30 April 2021, it became the first country to report over 400,000 new cases in a 24-hour period. Experts stated that the virus may reach an endemic stage in India rather than completely disappear; in late August 2021, Soumya Swaminathan said India may be in some stage of endemicity where the country learns to live with the virus.

India began its vaccination programme on 16 January 2021 with AstraZeneca vaccine (Covishield) and the indigenous Covaxin. Later, Sputnik V and the Moderna vaccine was approved for emergency use too. On 30 January 2022, India announced that it administered about 1.7 billion doses of vaccines and more than 720 million people were fully vaccinated.

== Timeline ==

=== 2020 ===
On 12 January 2020, the WHO confirmed that a novel coronavirus was the cause of a respiratory illness in a cluster of people in Wuhan, Hubei, China, which was reported to the WHO on 31 December 2019.

On 30 January 2020, India reported its first case of COVID-19 in Thrissur, Kerala, which rose to three cases by 3 February 2020; all were students returning from Wuhan. Apart from these, no significant rise in transmissions was observed in February. On 4 March 22 new cases were reported, including 14 infected members of an Italian tourist group. Transmissions increased over the month after several people with travel history to affected countries, and their contacts, tested positive. On 12 March, a 76-year-old man, with a travel history to Saudi Arabia, became the first COVID-19 fatality of India.

Cases

Deaths

A Sikh preacher, who had a travel history to Italy and Germany, turned into a superspreader by attending a Sikh festival in Anandpur Sahib during 10–12 March. Over 40,000 people in 20 villages in Punjab were quarantined on 27 March to contain the spread. On 31 March, a Tablighi Jamaat religious congregation event in Delhi, which had taken place earlier in March, emerged as a COVID-19 hotspot. On 2 May, around 4,000 stranded pilgrims returned from Hazur Sahib in Nanded, Maharashtra to Punjab. Many of them tested positive, including 27 bus drivers and conductors who had been part of the transport arrangement.

In July 2020, it was estimated based on antibody tests that at least 57% of the inhabitants of Mumbai's slums may have been infected with COVID-19 at some point.

A government panel on COVID-19 stated in October 2020 that the pandemic had peaked in India, and could come under control by February 2021. This prediction was based on a mathematical simulation referred to as the "Indian Supermodel", assuming that India reaches herd immunity. That month, a new SARS-CoV-2 variant, Lineage B.1.617, was detected in the country.

=== 2021: Second wave ===
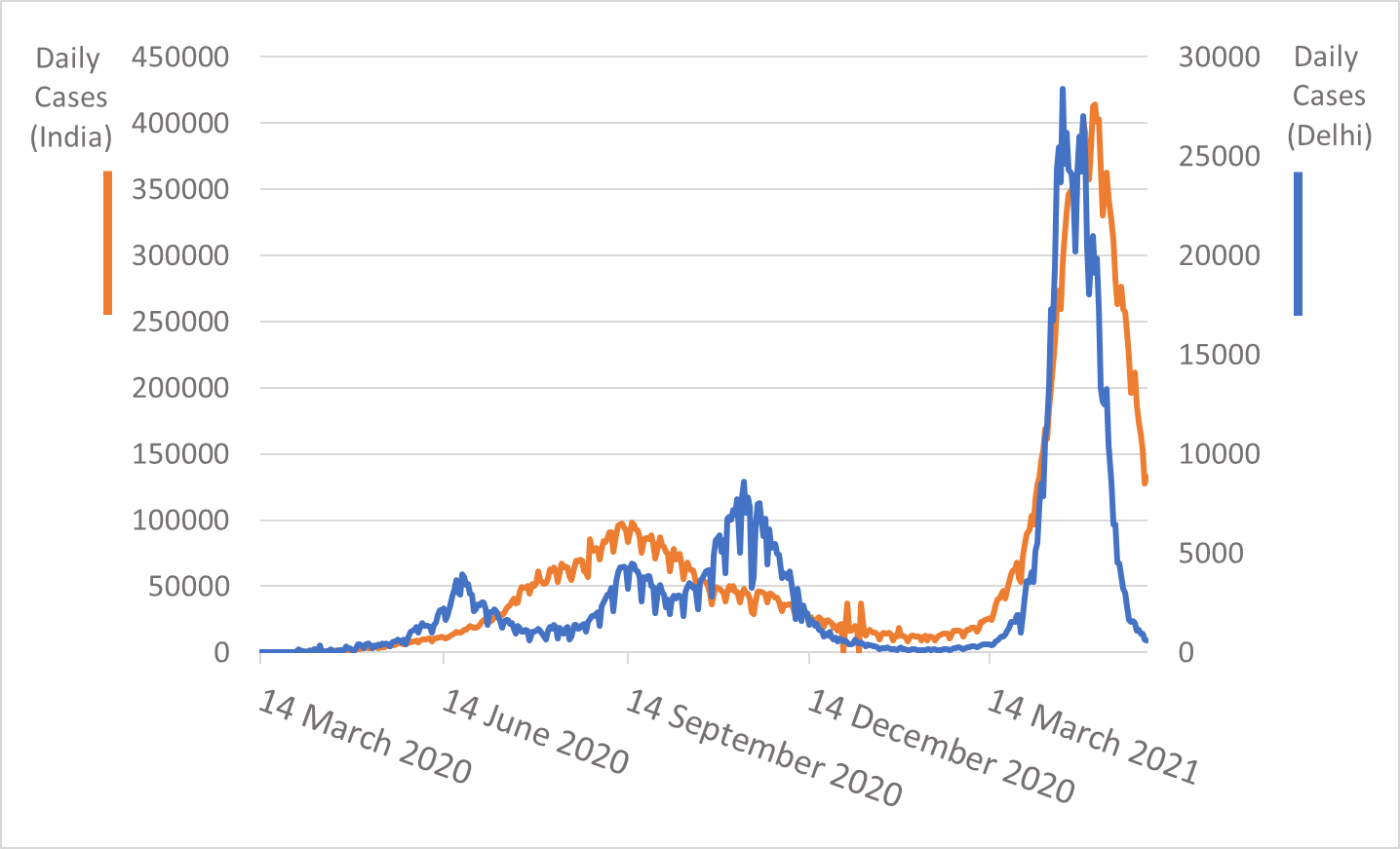
India's two waves versus Delhi's four waves in the same time period taking into account daily COVID-19 cases

India began its vaccination programme on 16 January 2021. On 19 January 2021, nearly a year after the first reported case in the country, Lakshadweep became the last region of India to report its first case. By February 2021, daily cases had fallen to 9,000 per-day. However, by early-April 2021, a major second wave of infections took hold in the country with destructive consequences; on 9 April, India surpassed 1 million active cases, and by 12 April, India overtook Brazil as having the second-most COVID-19 cases worldwide. By late April, India passed 2.5 million active cases and was reporting an average of 300,000 new cases and 2,000 deaths per-day. Some analysts feared this was an undercount. On 30 April, India reported over 400,000 new cases and over 3,500 deaths in one day.

Multiple factors have been proposed to have potentially contributed to the sudden spike in cases, including highly-infectious variants of concern such as Lineage B.1.617, a lack of preparations as temporary hospitals were often dismantled after cases started to decline, and new facilities were not built, and health and safety precautions being poorly-implemented or enforced during weddings, festivals (such as Holi on 29 March, and the Haridwar Kumbh Mela which was linked to at least 1,700 positive cases between 10 and 14 April including cases in Hindu seers), sporting events (such as IPL), state and local elections in which politicians and activists have held in several states, and in public places. An economic slowdown put pressure on the government to lift restrictions, and there had been a feeling of exceptionalism based on the hope that India's young population and childhood immunisation scheme would blunt the impact of the virus. Models may have underestimated projected cases and deaths due to the under-reporting of cases in the country.

Due to high demand, the vaccination programme began to be hit with supply issues; exports of the Oxford–AstraZeneca vaccine were suspended to meet domestic demand, there have been shortages of the raw materials required to manufacture vaccines domestically, while hesitancy and a lack of knowledge among poorer, rural communities has also impacted the programme.

The second wave placed a major strain on the healthcare system, including a shortage of liquid medical oxygen due to ignored warnings which began in the first wave itself, logistic issues, and a lack of cryogenic tankers. On 23 April, Modi met via video conference with liquid oxygen suppliers including Reliance, SAIL, JSW, Tata Steel, JSPL, AMNS, LINDE, INOX Air Products and Air Water Jamshedpur, where he acknowledged the need to "provide solutions in a very short time", and acknowledged efforts such as increases in production, and the use of rail, and air transport to deliver oxygen supplies. A large number of new oxygen plants were announced; the installation burden being shared by the center, coordination with foreign countries with regard to oxygen plants received in the form of aid, and DRDO. A number of countries sent emergency aid to India in the form of oxygen supplies, medicines, raw material for vaccines and ventilators. This reflected a policy shift in India, as comparable aid offers had been rejected during the past sixteen years.

The number of new cases had begun to steadily drop by late-May; on 25 May, the country reported 195,994 new cases—its lowest daily increase since 13 April. However, the mortality rate has remained high; by 24 May, India recorded over 300,000 deaths attributed to COVID-19. Around 100,000 deaths had occurred in the last 26 days, and 50,000 in the last 12. In May 2021, WHO declared that two variants first found in India will be referred to as 'Delta' and 'Kappa'. The state of Karnataka announced a COVID-19 memorial later that spring, to honour healthcare professionals who had succumbed to the virus.

On 25 August 2021, Soumya Swaminathan said that India "may be entering some kind of stage of endemicity where there is low level transmission or moderate level transmission going on" but nothing as severe as before, in other words India is learning to live with the virus.

India announced a mandatory 10-day quarantine on travellers arriving from United Kingdom irrespective of their vaccination status starting 4 October 2021 after United Kingdom also put the same restrictions on travellers from India by not recognizing India's vaccine certificate. On 8 October the United Kingdom opened up the restrictions on travelers from 47 countries and locations including India.

=== 2022 ===
By March, India had just 22,487 cases across the country. With 58.8% population fully vaccinated and 70% having received at least one dose opening up post-pandemic has been steady. Buoyed by the success of its vaccination program among senior citizens, adults, and adolescents, the vaccination program is now inoculating children in the 12-15 age group. Further, the central government has urged state governments to end all COVID curbs except masks and social distancing. International flights were resumed on 27 March after a gap of two years.

=== 2023 ===
On 22 March 2023, Prime Minister Modi held a high-level meeting to discuss the nation's preparedness for a new wave of infections, potentially driven by the newly detected SARS-CoV-2 strain, XBB.1.16. Active cases had reached a 5-month high as of 23 March and came amid an ongoing H3N2 influenza outbreak, prompting officials to determine the readiness of the healthcare system and its logistical needs. In response to the rising number of cases, some hospitals reopened Covid wards that had previously been shuttered following a yearlong lull in infections.

In August, a new subvariant of Omicron, named Eris was detected in the state of Maharashtra with cases increasing in a few cities.

While in December, the JN.1 variant, believed to be a descendant of Omicron subvariant known as BA.2.86 or Pirola, arrived in the southern state Kerala with an RT-PCR-positive sample from Karakulam in Thiruvananthapuram district.

== Response ==
=== Health care and testing ===
COVID-19 Dashboard
Total samples tested	68,24,28,595
Total positive cases	3,36,78,786
New samples tested	11,54,302
New Positive cases	26,248
New Positivity Rate	2.5%
Total active cases	171,830
Total deaths	4,82,017
Total recovered cases	3,43,06,414
Total Doses administered	1,46,70,18,464
People vaccinated 1st dose	86,12,38,061
People vaccinated 2nd dose	61,63,65,612
As of 5 January 2022

Do's & Don'ts of COVID-19 released by the Government of India

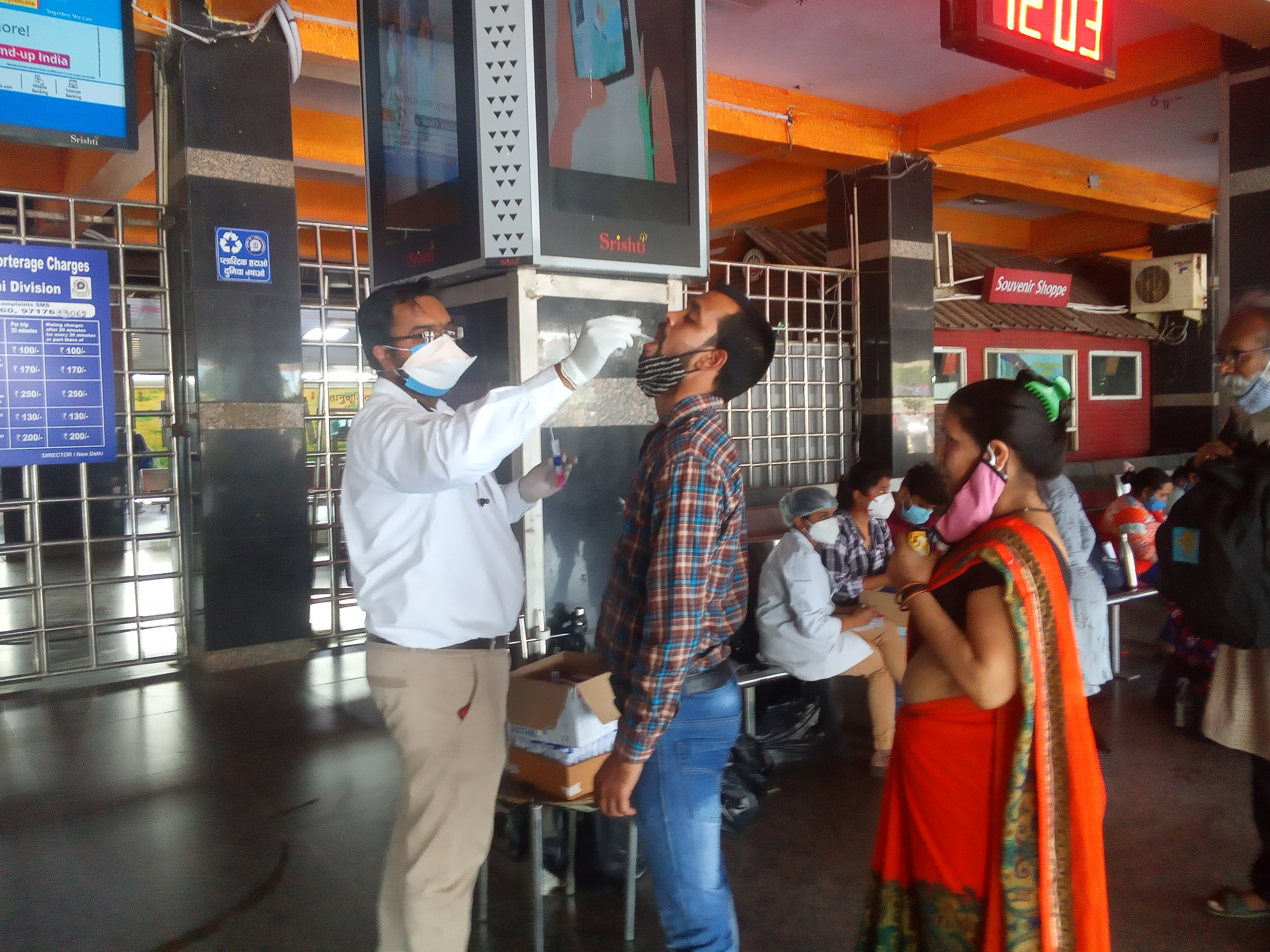
A passenger being tested for COVID-19 at the New Delhi railway station during the second wave of the pandemic

The Union Health Ministry's war room and policy making team in New Delhi decide how coronavirus should be tackled in the country, and consists of the ministry's Emergency Medical Response Unit, the Central Surveillance Unit (IDSP), the National Centre for Disease Control (NCDC) and experts from three government hospitals among others. In March 2020, India's strategy was focused on cluster-containment, similar to how India contained previous epidemics, as well as "breaking the chain of transmission". 52 labs were named capable of virus testing by 13 March.

On 14 March 2020, scientists at the National Institute of Virology (NIV) isolated a strain of the novel coronavirus. India was the fifth country to successfully obtain a pure sample of the virus; isolation of the virus would help towards expediting the development of drugs, vaccines and rapid diagnostic kits in the country. NIV shared two SARS-CoV-2 genome sequences with GISAID. In May, the NIV introduced another test kit for rapid testing.

==== Initial testing ====
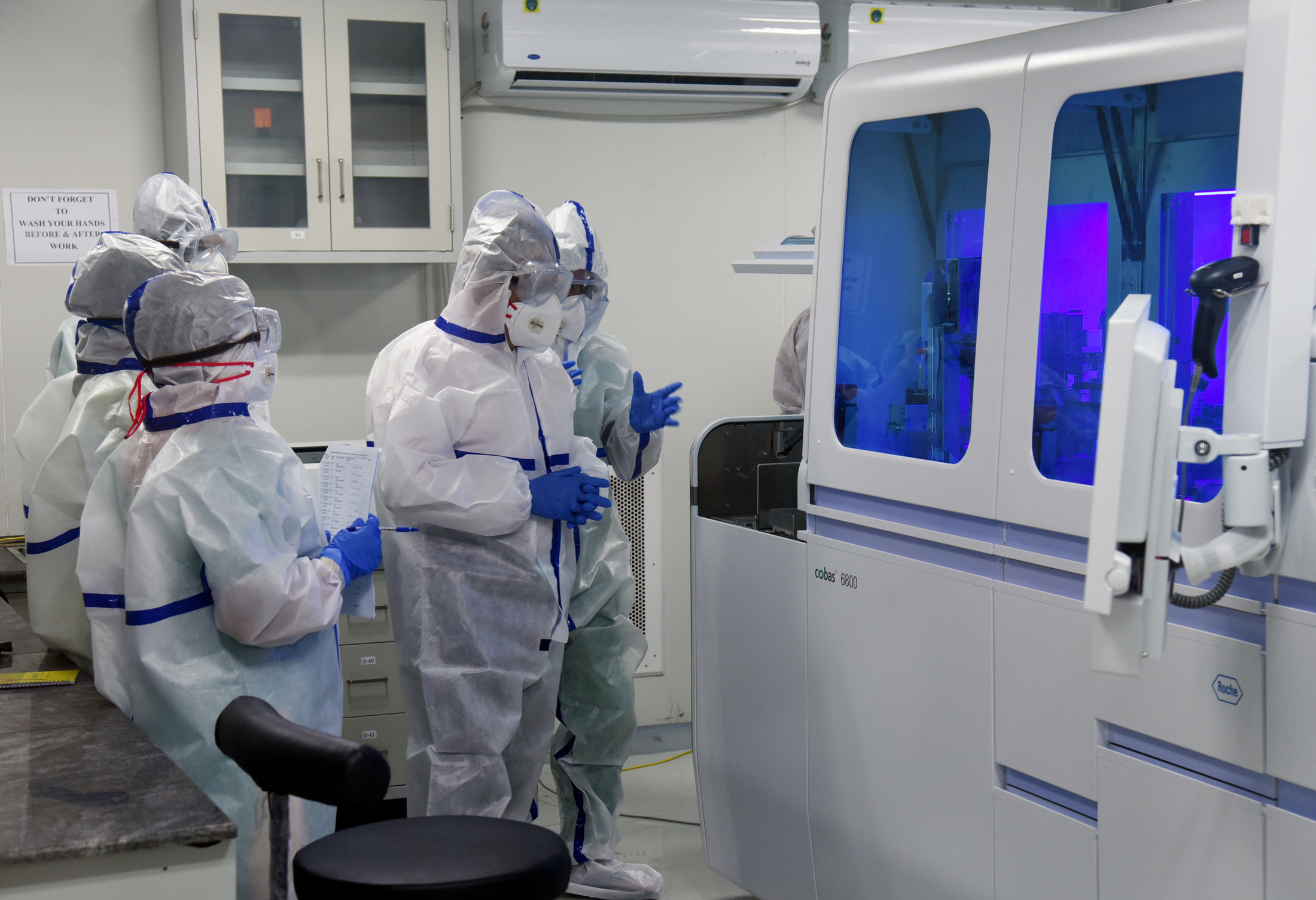
A testing facility at the National Centre for Disease Control in Delhi

Initially, the labs tested samples only from those with a travel history to 12 countries designated as high-risk, or those who had come in contact with anyone testing positive for the coronavirus, or showing symptoms as per the government guidelines. On 20 March 2020, the government decided to also include all pneumonia cases, regardless of travel or contact history. On 9 April, ICMR further revised the testing strategy and allowed testing of the people showing symptoms for a week in the hotspot areas of the country, regardless of travel history or local contact to a patient. While the health ministry claimed enough tests were being performed, experts disagreed, saying that community transmission may go undetected.

==== Expansion of tests ====
On 17 March 2020, the health ministry decided to allow accredited private pathology labs to test for COVID-19. A person could get a COVID-19 test at a private lab after a qualified physician in a government facility recommended it. Experts said this increased testing may ultimately result in a correction of the current under-counting and an increase in confirmed cases.

111 additional labs for testing became functional on 21 March. On 24 March, Mylab Discovery Solutions became the first Indian company to have received regulatory validation for its RT-PCR tests. In April, Institute of Genomics and Integrative Biology, Delhi had developed a low cost paper-strip test that could detect COVID-19 within an hour. Each test would cost ₹500.00 (equivalent to ₹640 or US$6.90 in 2026). On 13 April, ICMR advised pool testing in low infection areas to increase the capacity of the testing and save resources. In this process maximum five samples are tested at once and samples are tested individually only if a pool tests positive. Faulty test kits from China were subsequently returned and future orders cancelled.

By 9 July 2020, 1132 testing labs were functional. Following testing shortages, non-accredited private laboratories applying for accreditation were also given permission to test for coronavirus. In September 2020, India had attained the highest number of daily tests in the world. By 5 May 2021, 2506 testing labs (government and private) were functional and the total daily national testing capacity reached 1,500,000 tests.

==== Testing community transmission ====
Testing for community transmission began on 15 March 2020. 65 government laboratories started testing random samples of people who exhibit flu-like symptoms and samples from patients without any travel history or contact with infected persons. As of 18 March, no evidence of community transmission was found after results of 500 random samples tested negative. Between 15 February and 2 April, 5,911 SARI (Severe Acute Respiratory Illnesses) patients were tested throughout the country of which, 104 tested positive (1.8%) in 20 states and union territories. About 40% of the identified patients did not have a travel history or any history of contact with a positive patient. The ICMR advised to prioritise containment in the 36 districts of 15 states which had reported positive cases among SARI patients.

In April 2020 WHO placed India in the community transmission stage however in June moved India to clusters of cases. In October 2020, the health minister admitted to community transmission limited to some states and districts. Until May 2021, India insisted that clusters of cases remained, and there was no nationwide community transmission.

==== Daily samples tested ====
Data

==== Research and treatment ====
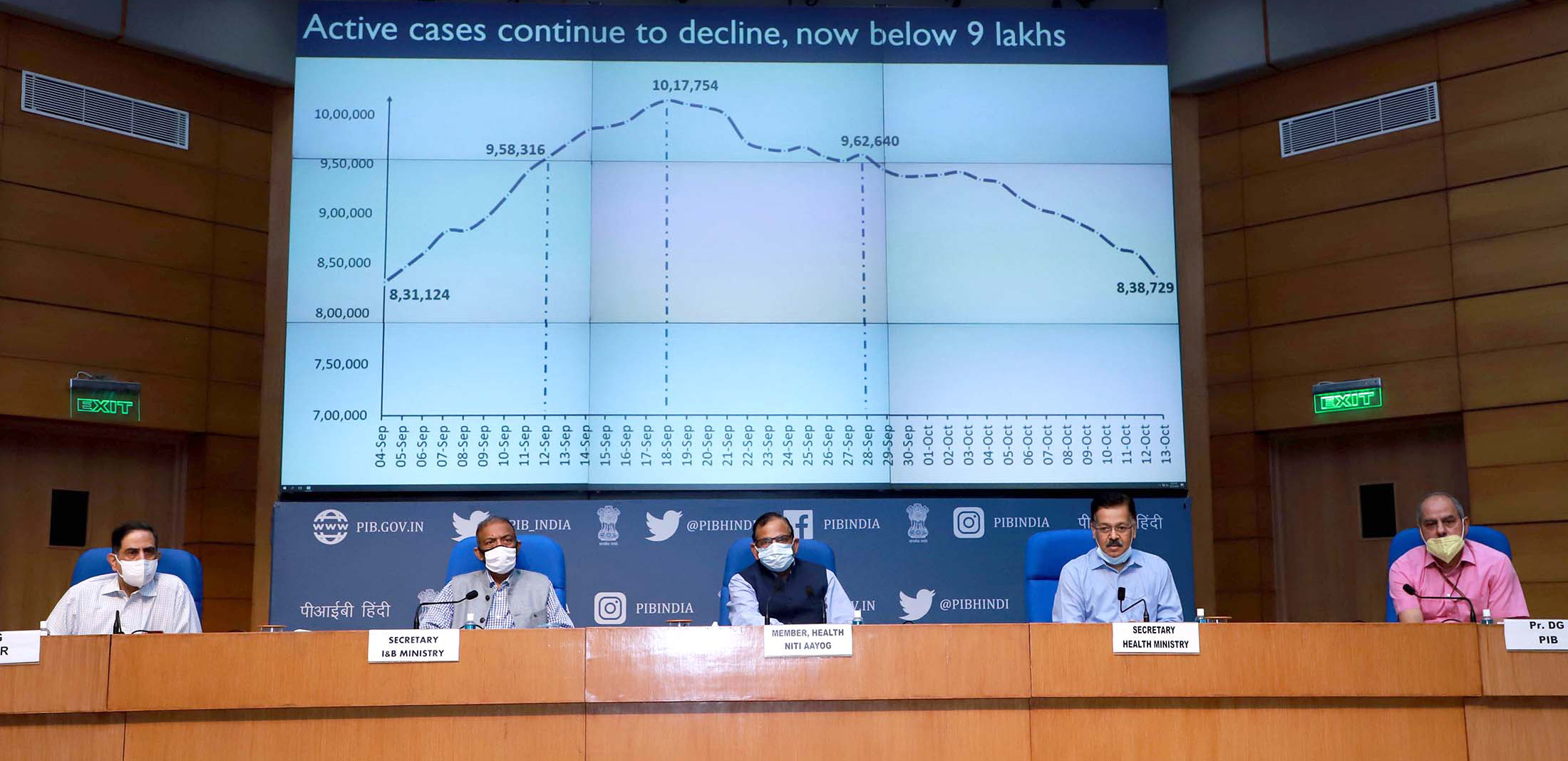
NITI Aayog health member Vinod K. Paul, Secretary, Ministry of Health & Family Welfare, Rajesh Bhushan, and other officials, addressing a press conference on COVID-19, in New Delhi on 13 October 2020.

On 23 March, the National Task Force for COVID-19 constituted by the ICMR recommended the use of hydroxychloroquine for the treatment of high-risk cases. In the same month, the Indian Institute of Chemical Technology, the Council of Scientific and Industrial Research (CSIR) and Cipla launched a joint venture to develop anti-COVID-19 drugs. In April, funds for a number of preventive agents were released to initiate research. The Centre for Cellular and Molecular Biology started working on genome sequencing of COVID-19 in early 2020.

India was estimated to have approximately 40,000 ventilators in March 2020, of which 8,432 were with the public sector. The government aimed to double the capacity of ventilators by June 2020, with the assistance from Indian PSUs, firms and startups, including Bharat Electronics, DRDO and ISRO. This led to the creation of some of the world's smallest and cheapest ventilators. Production lines were repurposed to manufacture general Personal protective equipment, full body suits and ventilators; India was producing around 200,000 PPE kits and 250,000 N95 masks per day in May 2020, compared to virtually zero shortly before.

Several states were allowed by ICMR and Drugs Controller General of India (DCGI) to start clinical trials of convalescent plasma therapy and plasma exchange therapy. Initial optimism around plasma therapy, resulted in ICMR stating that there is no robust evidence to support convalescent plasma therapy as a routine therapy, describing it is as an emerging and experimental therapy. Convalescent plasma therapy was dropped form the COVID-19 treatment protocol by ICMR in mid May 2021.

In June 2020, India approved the repurposing of generic versions of the antiviral medication favipiravir for the treatment of mild-to-moderate COVID-19 symptoms by Glenmark, Cipla and the Indian Institute of Chemical Technology and Lupin Limited. In July 2020, the Indian firm Biocon received emergency authorisation for the use of the repurposed drug Itolizumab in treatments for chronic plaque psoriasis, one of the symptoms of the disease.

On 23 April 2021, Cadila Healthcare received an emergency authorisation to repurpose Peginterferon alfa-2b, a medication used to treat hepatitis C, as a treatment for moderate COVID-19 in adults. On 8 May 2021, DCGI gave permission for emergency use of the drug 2-Deoxy-D-glucose developed by DRDO in collaboration with Dr. Reddy's Laboratories as an adjunct or alternative therapy for treating moderate to severe cases of COVID-19.

By April 2021, the latest treatment guidelines mirrored those of the WHO and the United States with the important exception that, in India, mildly ill patients were allowed to be given Hydroxychloroquine or Ivermectin. This potential off-label prescription seems to have taken off in some parts of India: Kavery Nambisan, an Indian surgeon, said that a doctor in Kandivali, Mumbai, has treated thousands of patients with ivermectin. In January 2023, hydroxychloroquine and ivermectin were not recommended anymore at all in the national clinical guidance for management of adult covid-19 patients.

==== Vaccine development and production ====
The Indian government infused ₹900 crore (equivalent to ₹12 billion or US$120 million in 2026) into the Department of Biotechnology in November 2020 to aid the development of a COVID vaccine. The 2021 budget of India also allocated ₹35,000 crore (equivalent to ₹450 billion or US$4.8 billion in 2026) for vaccine procurement.

In January 2021, the DCGI initially approved the Oxford–AstraZeneca vaccine, manufactured by the Serum Institute of India (SII) under the trade name "Covishield", and BBV152 (Covaxin), a vaccine developed by Bharat Biotech in association with the Indian Council of Medical Research and National Institute of Virology.

The approval of Covaxin was met with some concern, as the vaccine had not then completed phase 3 trials. Due to this status, those receiving Covaxin were required to sign a consent form, while some states chose to relegate Covaxin to a "buffer stock" and primarily distribute the Oxford–AstraZeneca vaccine. Following the conclusion of its trial, the DCGI issued a standard emergency-use authorisation to Covaxin in March 2021. The slogan 'Dawai Bhi, Kadai Bhi' (trnsl; Vaccination and Precautions both are necessary) was used by the Indian Government.

In April 2021, the DCGI approved the Russian Sputnik V vaccine, which was trialled in India by Dr. Reddy's Laboratories. The initial shipment of 150 million Sputnik V doses arrived on 1 May, and began to be administered on 14 May. Domestic manufacturing of Sputnik V is expected to begin by August 2021, with doses imported from Russia being used in the meantime.

In May 2021, the DCGI approved phase 2 and 3 trials of Covaxin among children 2–18.

In late-June 2021, after the DCGI removed a requirement that all COVID-19 vaccines must be trialed locally before approval (notwithstanding any approval and wide use in other major countries), the DCGI approved the Moderna vaccine for emergency use.

==== Vaccination policy and distribution ====
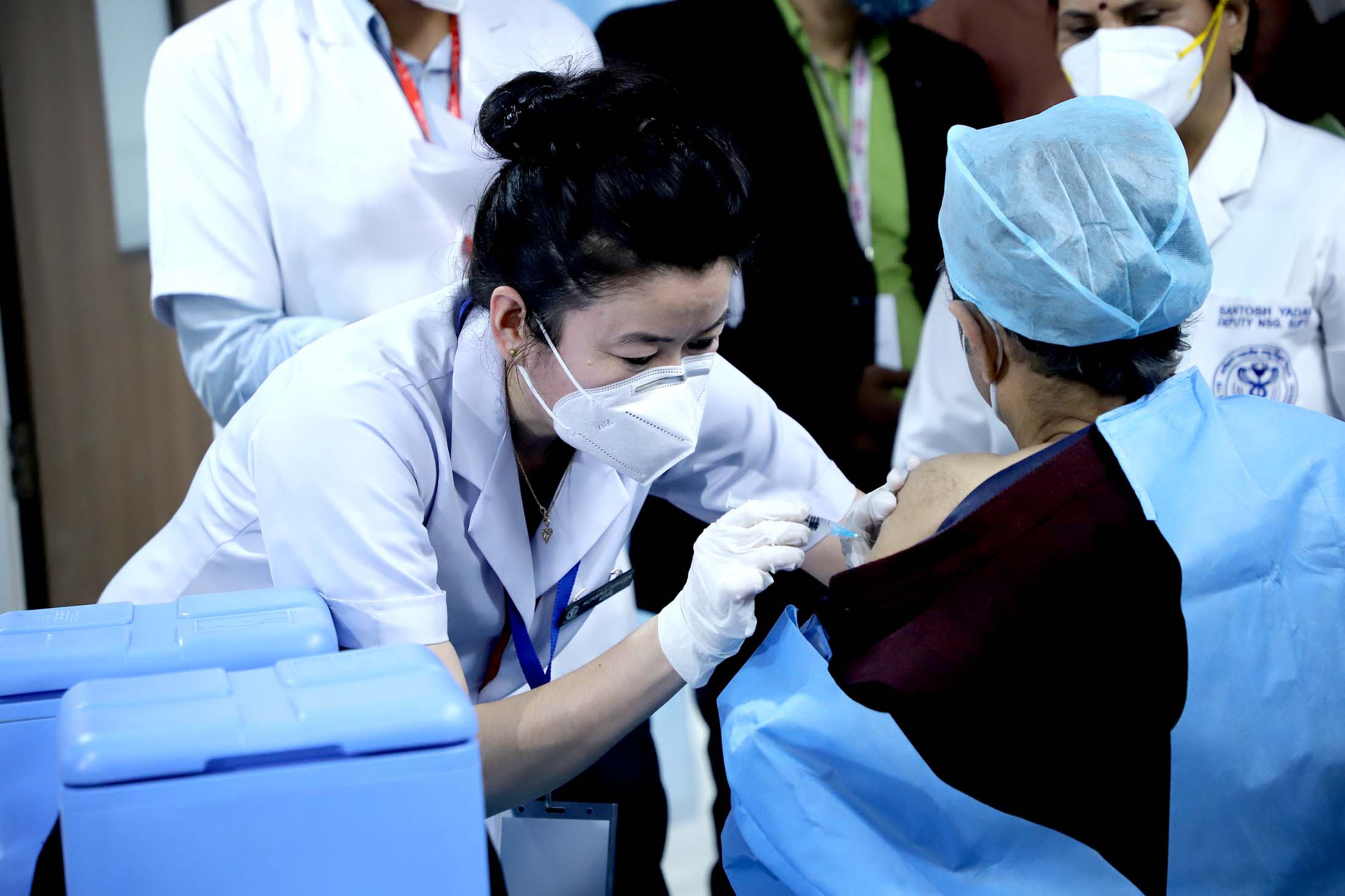
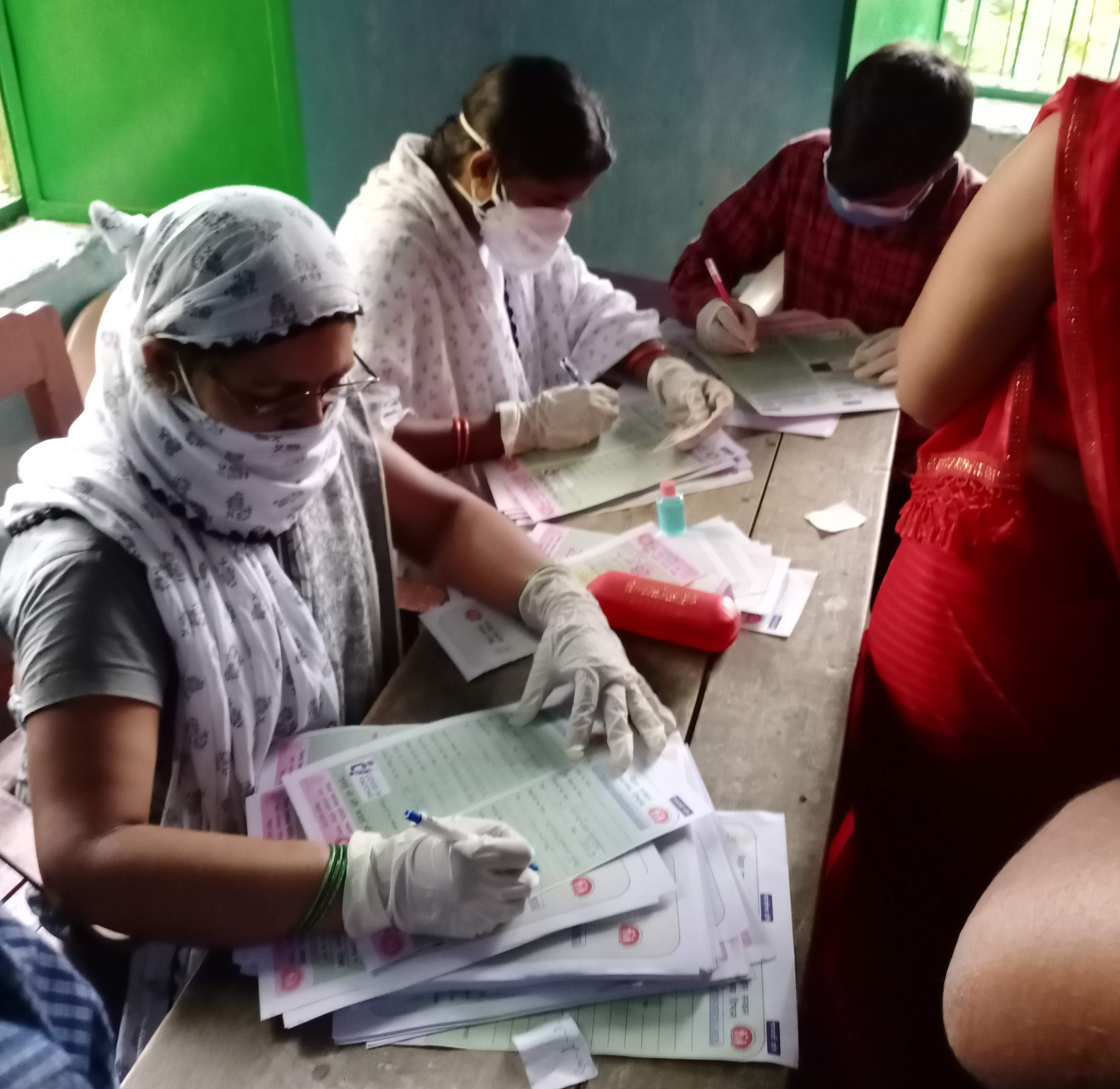
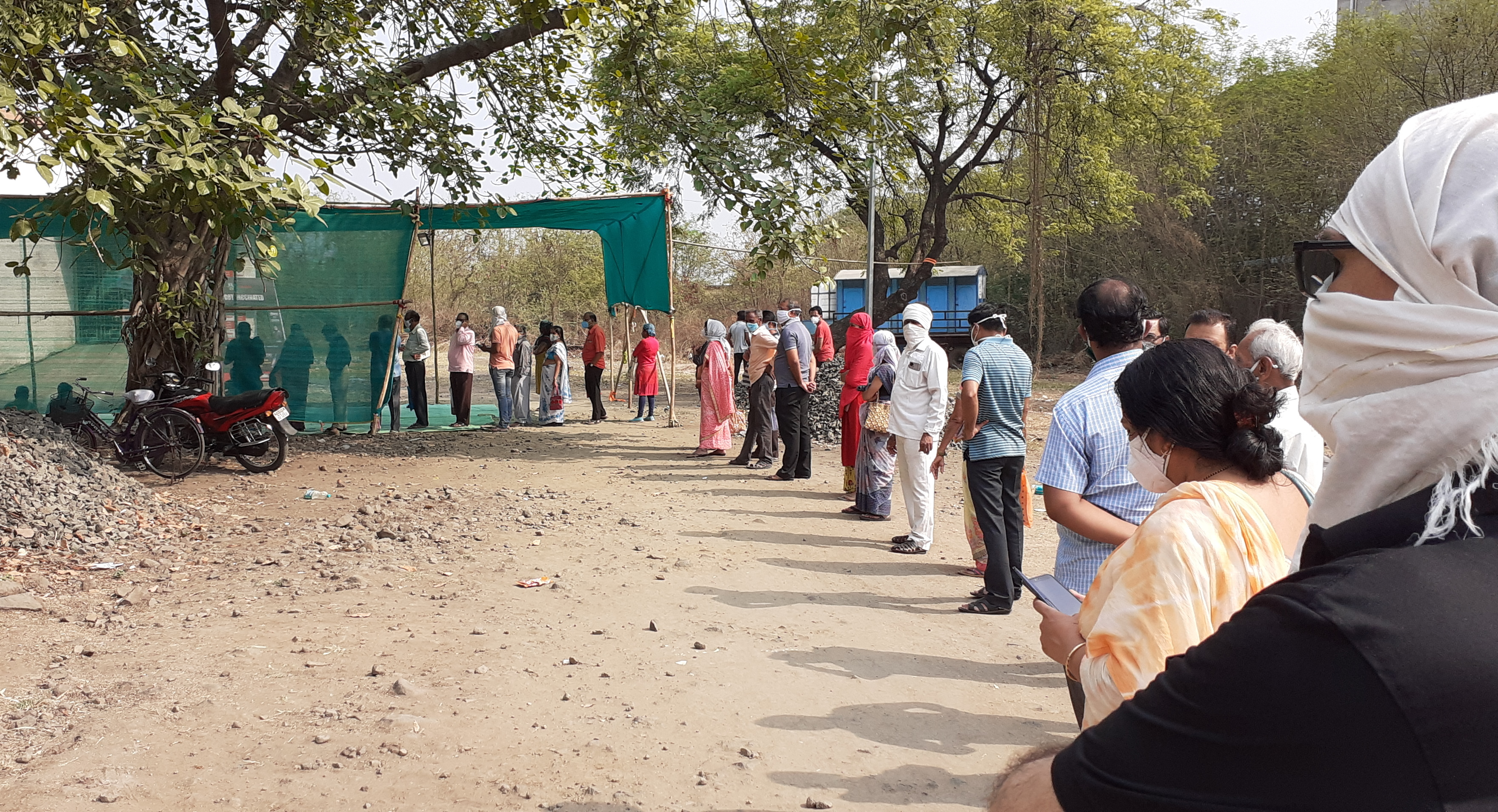
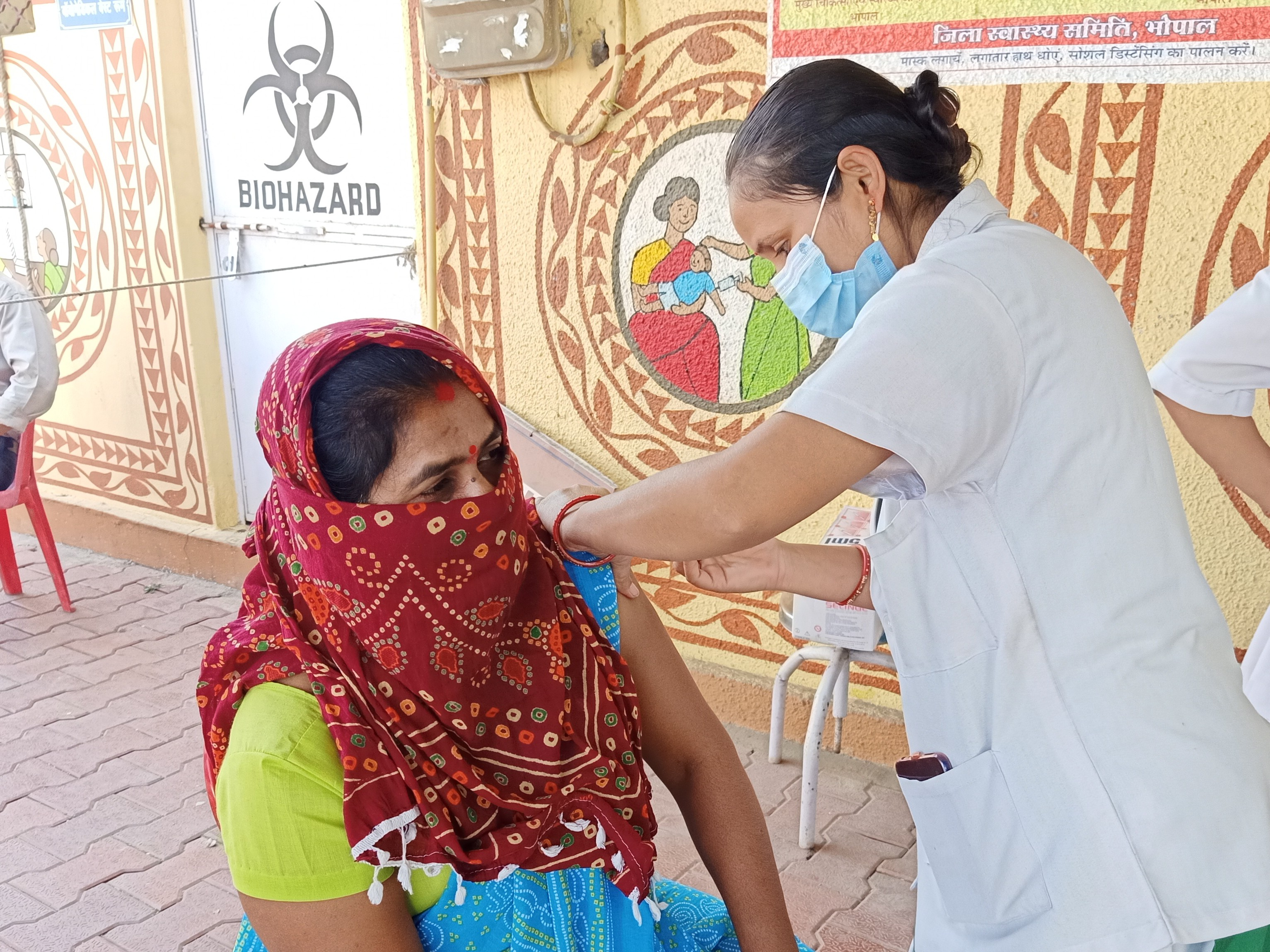
- Top left: A healthcare worker administering a COVID-19 vaccine dose in AIIMS New Delhi on 16 January 2021.
- Top right: Frontline workers in Bihar filling COVID19 vaccination cards in May 2021.
- Bottom left:A COVID19 vaccination queue in Nagpur, Maharashtra on 1 May 2021.
- Bottom right: A vaccination center in Bhopal.

Administratively, India began preparing to vaccinate its population in April 2020 with the setting up a Vaccine Task Force. Following this the National Expert Group on Vaccine Administration for COVID-19 (NEGVAC) was formed, and in October 2020 states were asked to set up state level mechanisms for the COVID-19 vaccine programme, and prepare cold chains points. A communication strategy for the vaccination programme was also revealed by the health ministry in January 2021, targeting issues such as vaccine eagerness and hesitancy.

India started out with a vaccination policy targeting 300 million people based on occupation and age group, to be completed a time period of six months, by August 2021.

- Phase 1 started on 16 January 2021 and targeted 10 million health workers (Note: Health-care workers include "Health-care providers and workers in the health-care setting (public and private), including Integrated Child Development Services (ICDS) workers. The group has been further divided into nine sub-groups: medical officers, nurses and supervisors, frontline health and ICDS workers, paramedical staff, support staff, medical, nursing and paramedical students, medical scientists and research staff, clerical and administrative staff and other health staff.") first followed by 20 million frontline workers. (Note: Frontline Workers (FLWs) include "Personnel from State and Central Police organisation, Armed Forces, Home Guards, prison staff, disaster management volunteers, Civil Defence organisation, Municipal Workers and revenue officials engaged in surveillance and containment activities." A number of states have included journalists as frontline workers. Gujarat has included crematorium workers as frontline workers.) Phase 1 was to be completed by 31 March. On 3 April, registrations for this group was closed. 67% of health, frontline workers received at least one dose; taking into account registered health and frontline workers, the number of fully vaccinated is 47%.
- Phase 2 began on 1 March 2021 to cover 45+ year old's with co-morbidities and 60+ year old's. On 1 April, vaccinations were opened for everyone above 45 years. Shortages in vaccine supplies were evident in March.

On 19 March 2021, in the Lok Sabha, the health minister of India stated that "It is not necessary, scientifically, to give each and every person in the country the vaccine. Not each and every person in the world will be vaccinated. The prioritisation process is a dynamic process..."

- Phase 3 of the vaccination campaign was opened up to include all eligible adults (18+) from 1 May 2021 following a surge in cases in April, a second wave. This expansion resulted in immediate, increased and prolonged vaccine shortages.

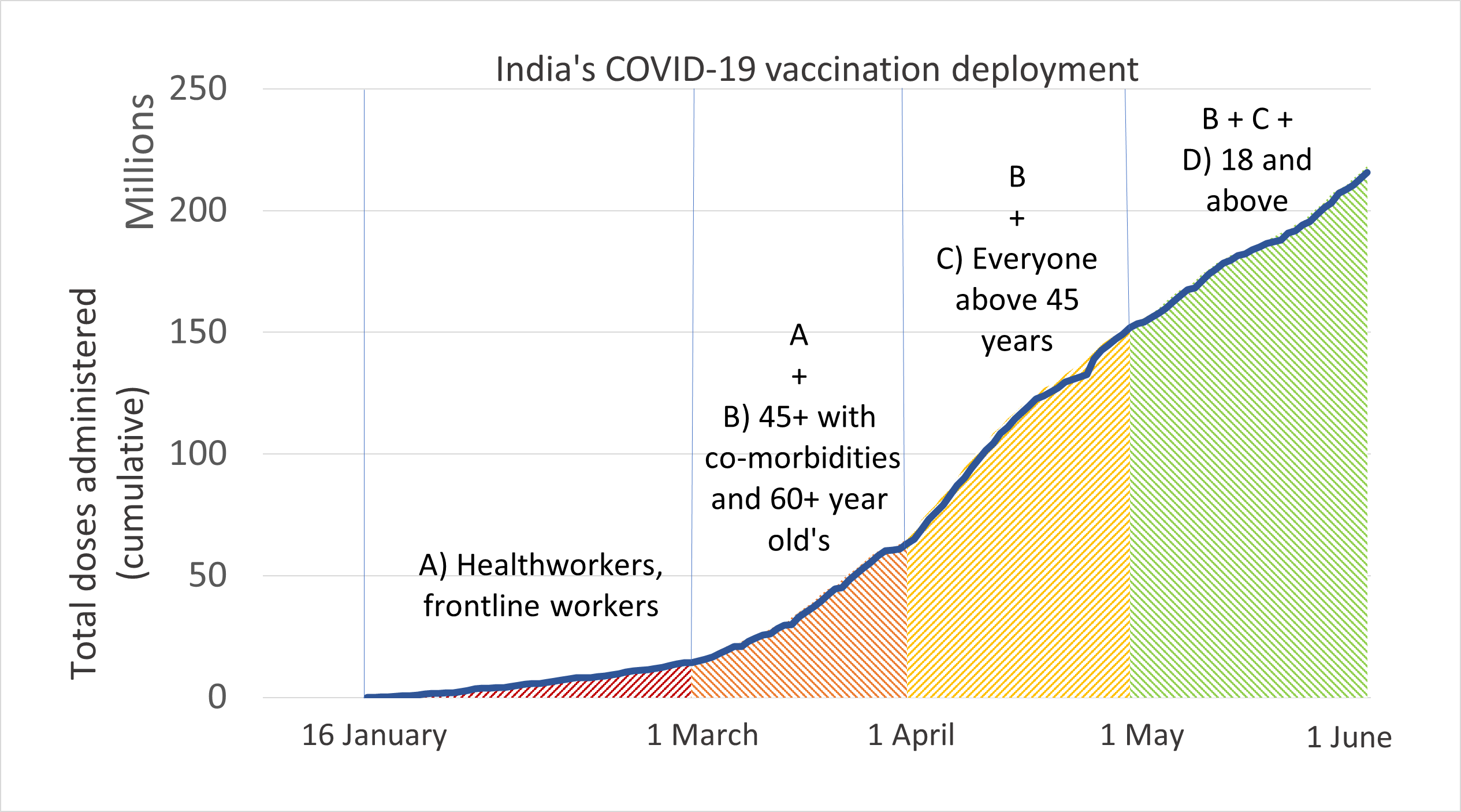
India's COVID-19 vaccination deployment until 3 June

Changes in procurement policies, the liberalised vaccination policy, and differential pricing further complicated the situation. Children in India experienced lower routine immunization coverage and greater delays in immunization during this time. Global vaccine obligations of India were also severely affected including those with south-Asian neighbours, and 190 countries associated with COVAX.

By 22 October 2021, India delivered 1 Billion doses for COVID-19 out of which, 700 million were single doses and 300 million were double doses.

According to a 2022 modelling study published in The Lancet Infectious Diseases journal, over 4.2 million lives were saved in India in 2021 due to vaccination against COVID-19.

=== Immediate relief ===
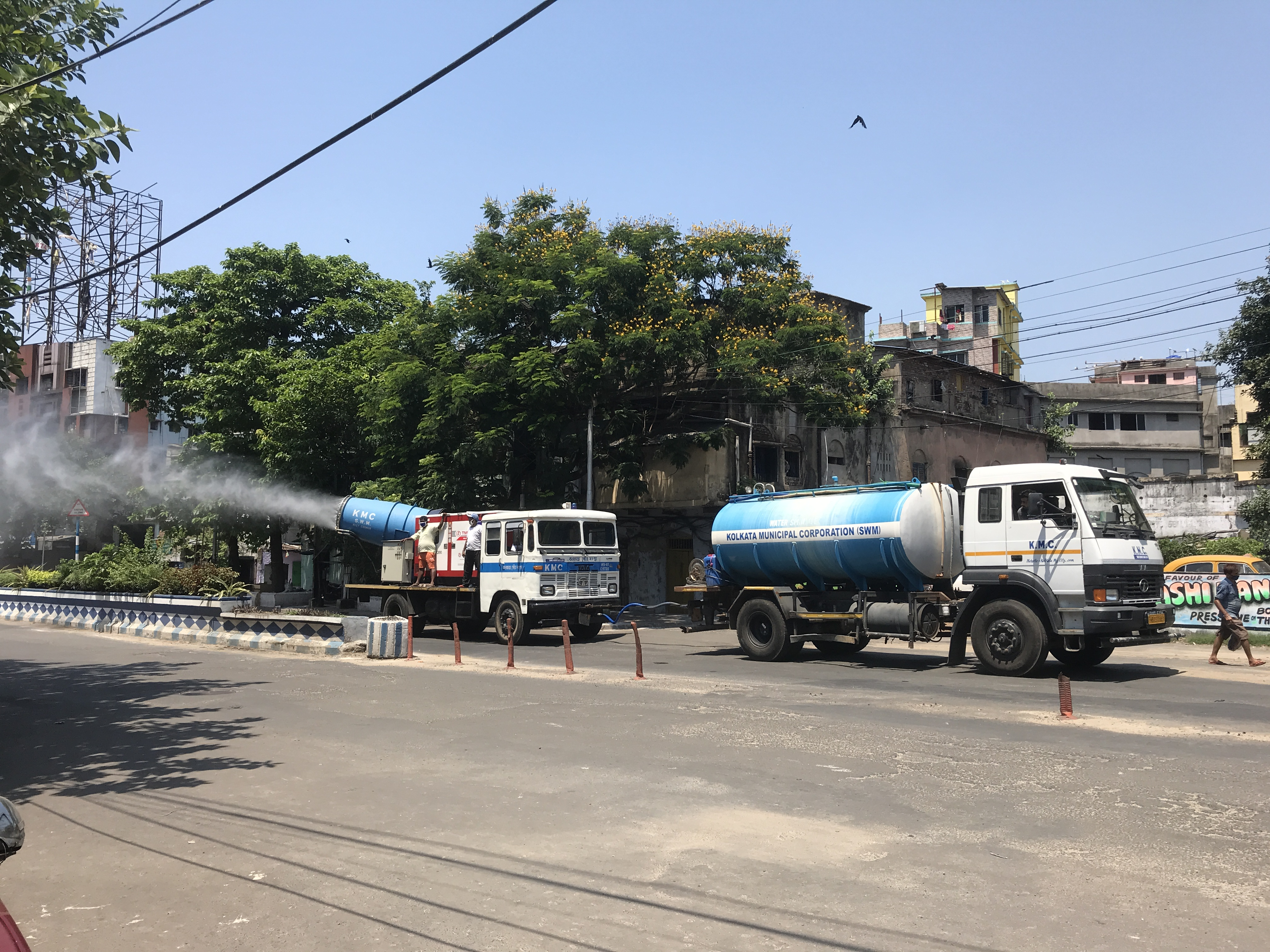
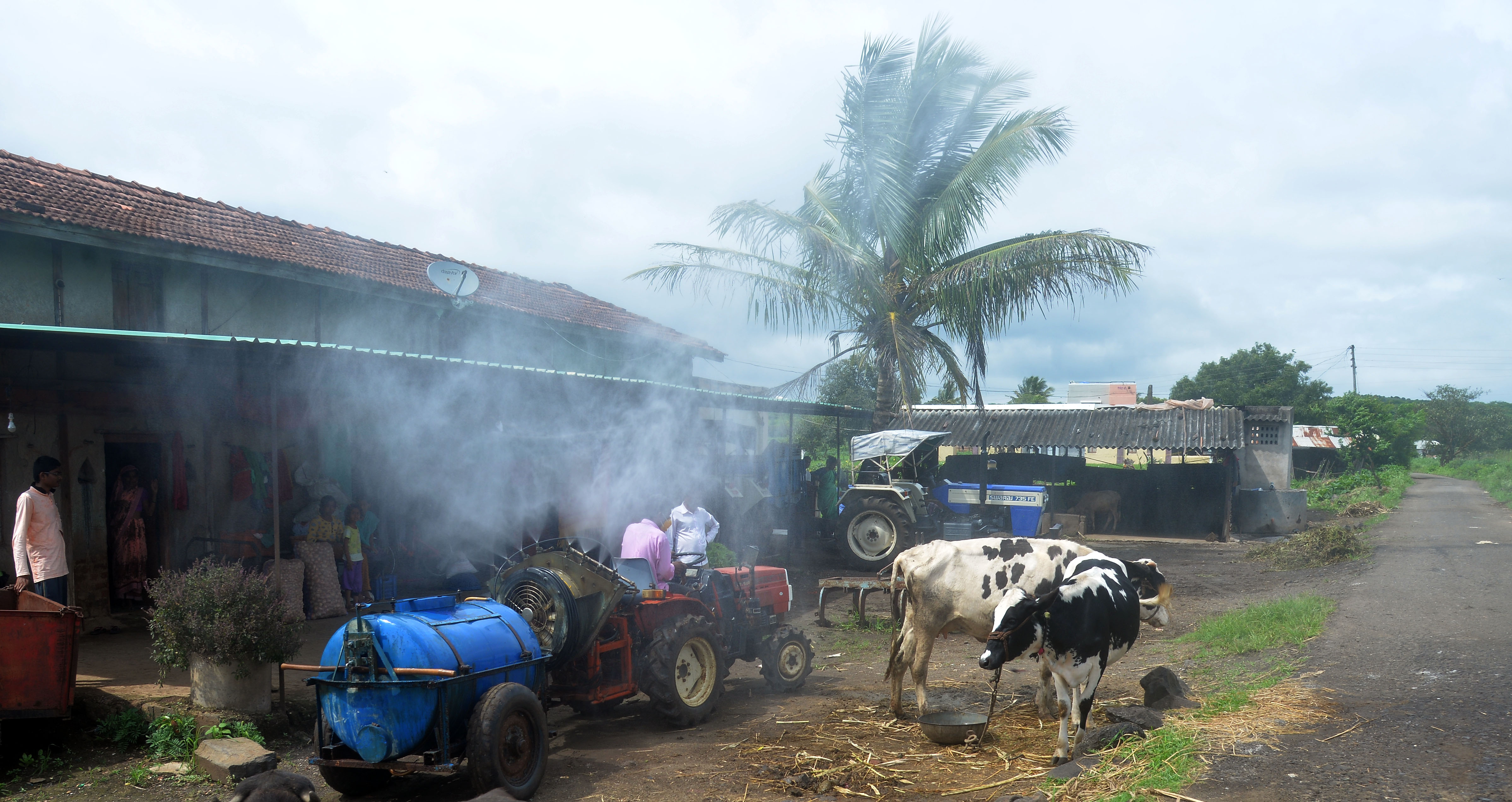
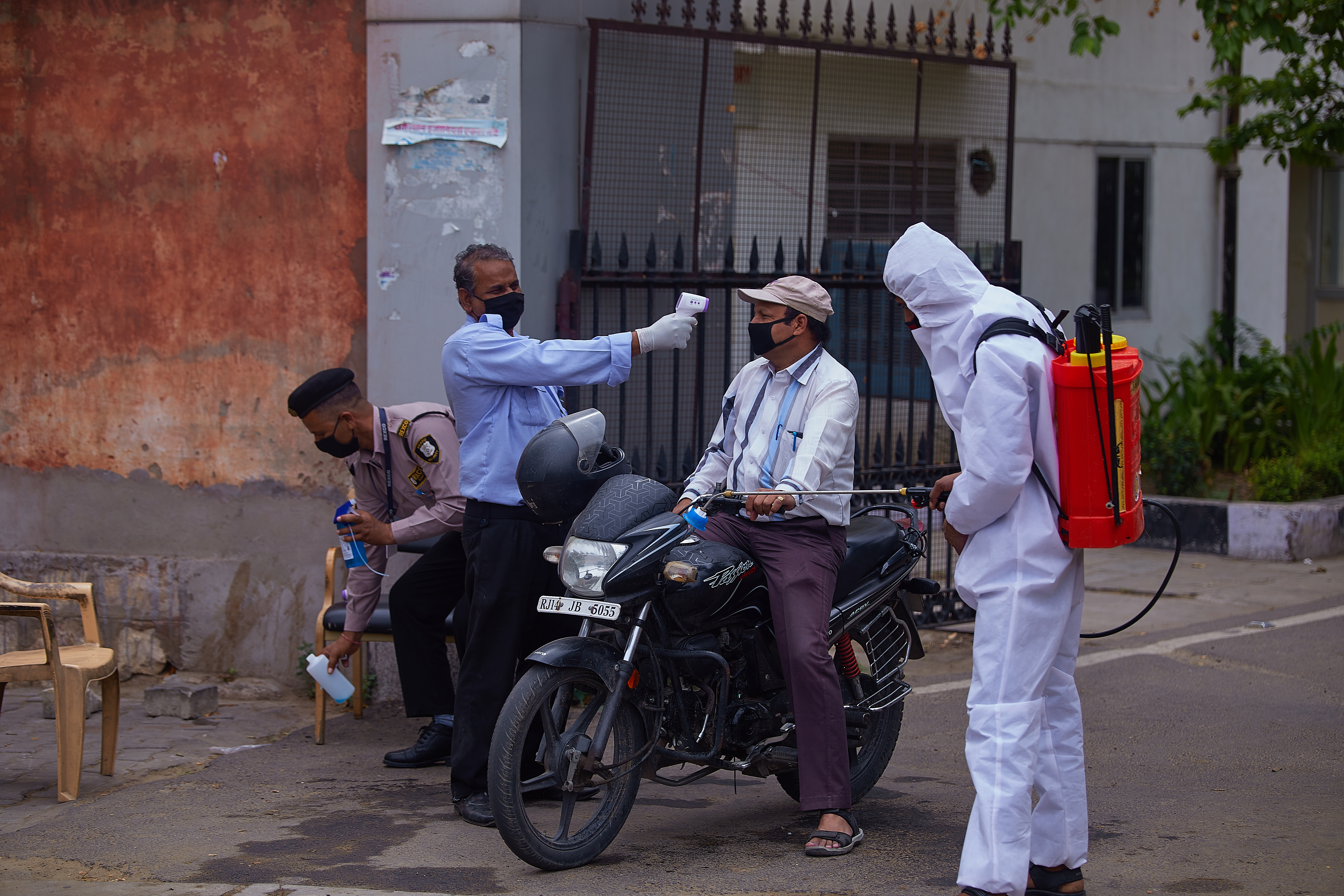
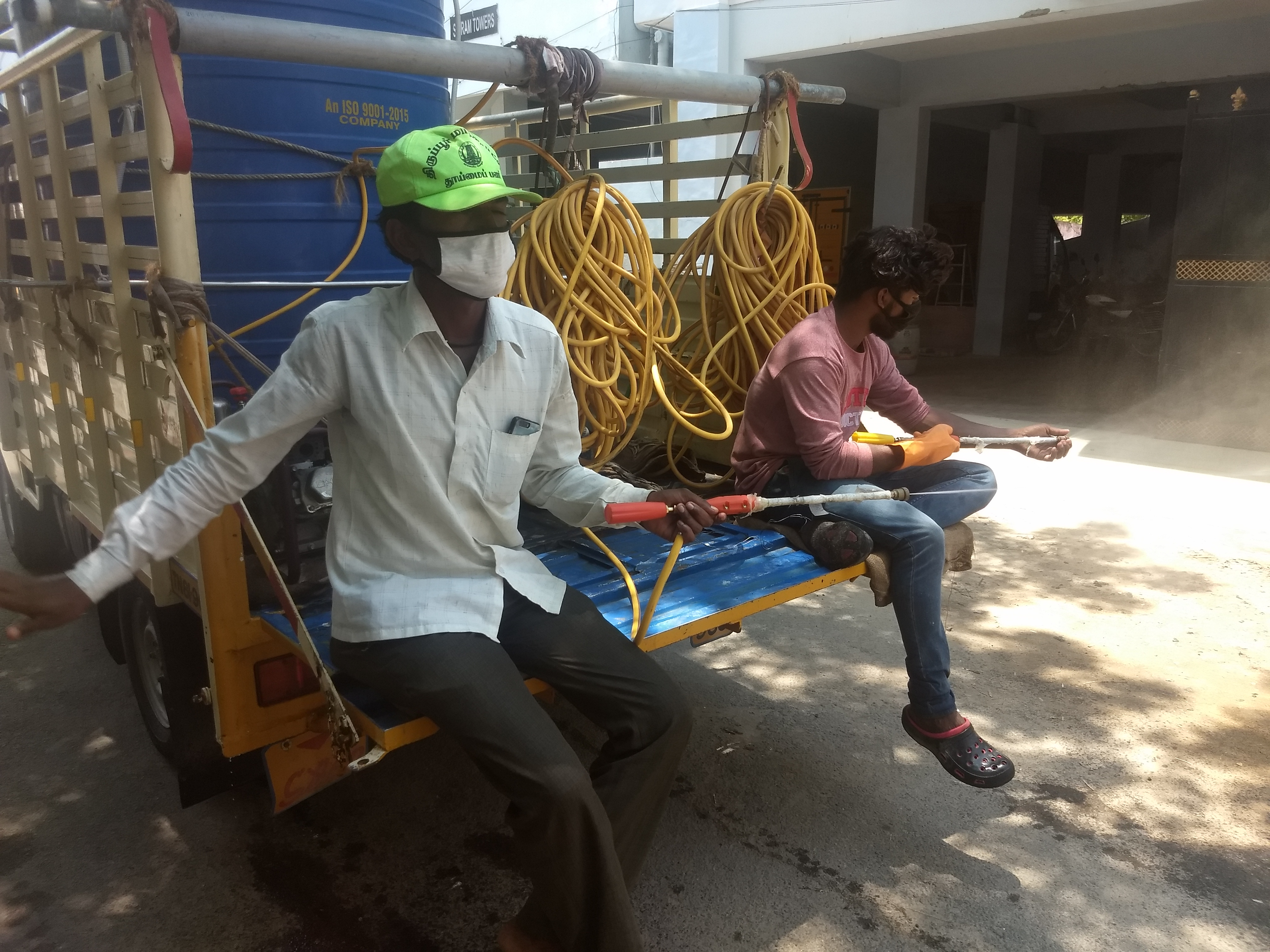
Various sanitisation methods were adopted

==== Welfare ====
On 19 March 2020, Kerala announced a stimulus package of ₹20,000 crore (equivalent to ₹260 billion or US$2.7 billion in 2026) to help the state overcome both the COVID-19 epidemic and economic hardship caused by it. On 21 March, Uttar Pradesh announced ₹1,000 (equivalent to ₹1,300 or US$14 in 2026) to all daily wage labourers. On 22 March, Punjab announced ₹3,000 (equivalent to ₹3,900 or US$41 in 2026) to all registered construction workers. A number of states and union territories went on to announce free and increased rations for ration card holders. Karnataka announced ₹1,610 crore (equivalent to ₹21 billion or US$220 million in 2026) relief for unorganised sectors including flower growers, washer-men and women, barbers, construction workers, auto and cab drivers, MSMEs, and weavers. The Delhi government announced that if a doctor, nurse or hygiene worker dies during treatment, their family will be provided ₹10 million (US$110,000). The Union government also announced the distribution of rations.

==== Economic relief and stimulus package ====
A food security scheme, part of wider economic relief package of ₹1.7 lakh crore (equivalent to ₹2.2 trillion or US$23 billion in 2026), was announced by the center on 26 March 2020. This also included direct cash transfer, primarily for migrant labourers and daily wage labourers; and free gas cylinders for three months. This was followed by RBI cutting repo rates, injecting liquidity and permitting banks to provide a moratorium on all loans for three months. Payment of taxes was relaxed and states were provided with short term credit via increased ways and means advances limits. Pending wages of daily wage labourers under Mgnrega scheme were released. On 12 May the Prime Minister announced an economic package of ₹20 lakh crore (equivalent to ₹26 trillion or US$270 billion in 2026); this included previous government actions, including the RBI announcements and the Finance Ministers announcement on 26 March. On 12 October and 12 November, the government announced two more economic stimulus packages, bringing the total economic stimulus to ₹29.87 lakh crore (equivalent to ₹38 trillion or US$410 billion in 2026). ₹15,000 crore (equivalent to ₹190 billion or US$2.1 billion in 2026) was sanctioned for the health sectors response to COVID-19.

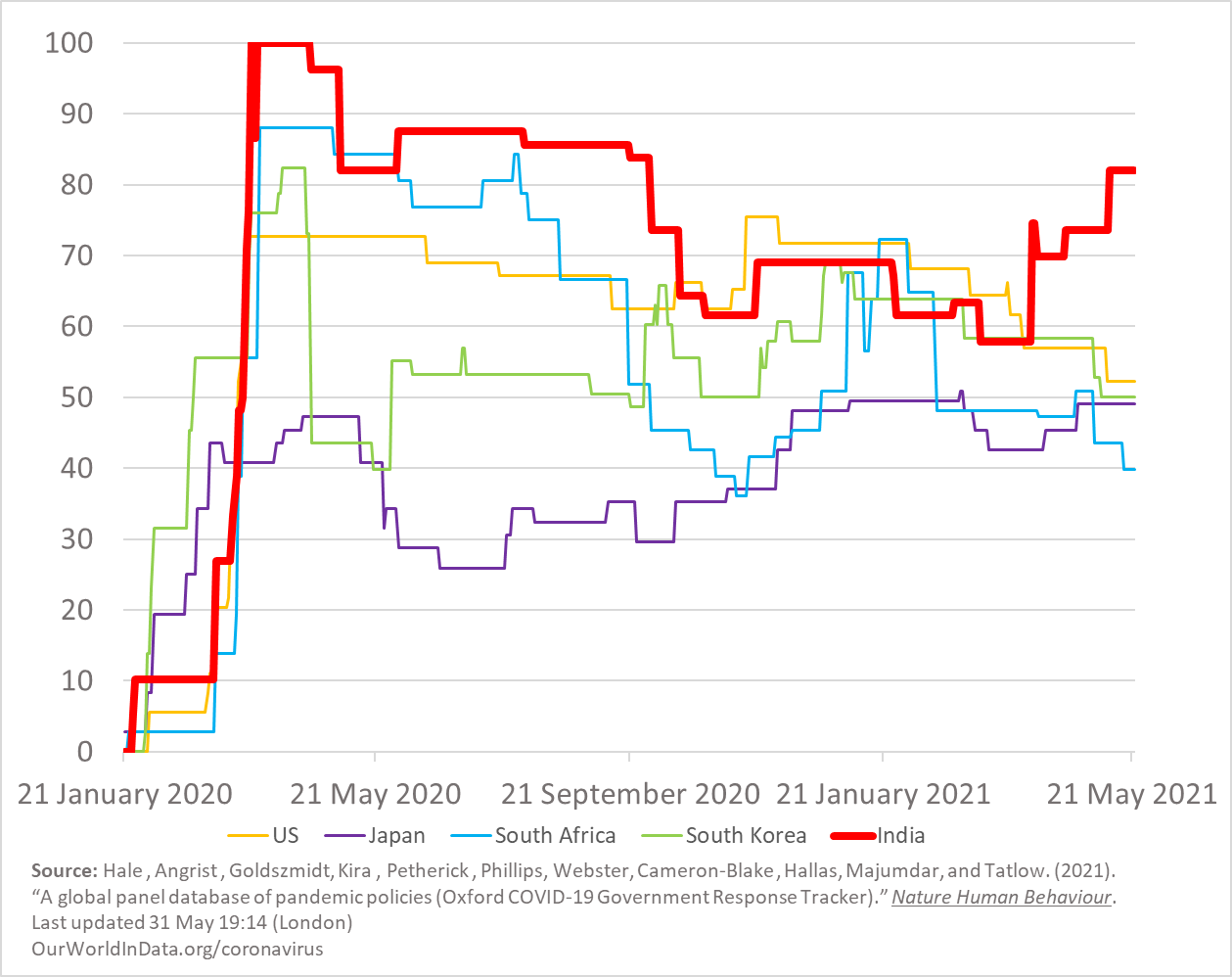
India's (in red) government stringency during the COVID-19 pandemic according to the Oxford COVID-19 Government Response Stringency Index. The stringency index includes schools, workplaces, public events, gatherings, public transport, public information campaigns, stay at home policy, internal movement, international travel, testing policy, contract tracing, face coverings, and vaccination policy.

On 12 June 2021, Finance Minister Nirmala Sitharaman announced to reduce the GST tax rates on the equipments, medicines, masks, sanitizers etc. which are being using for the treatment of COVID-19.

=== Lockdowns ===
==== First wave: Nation-wide ====
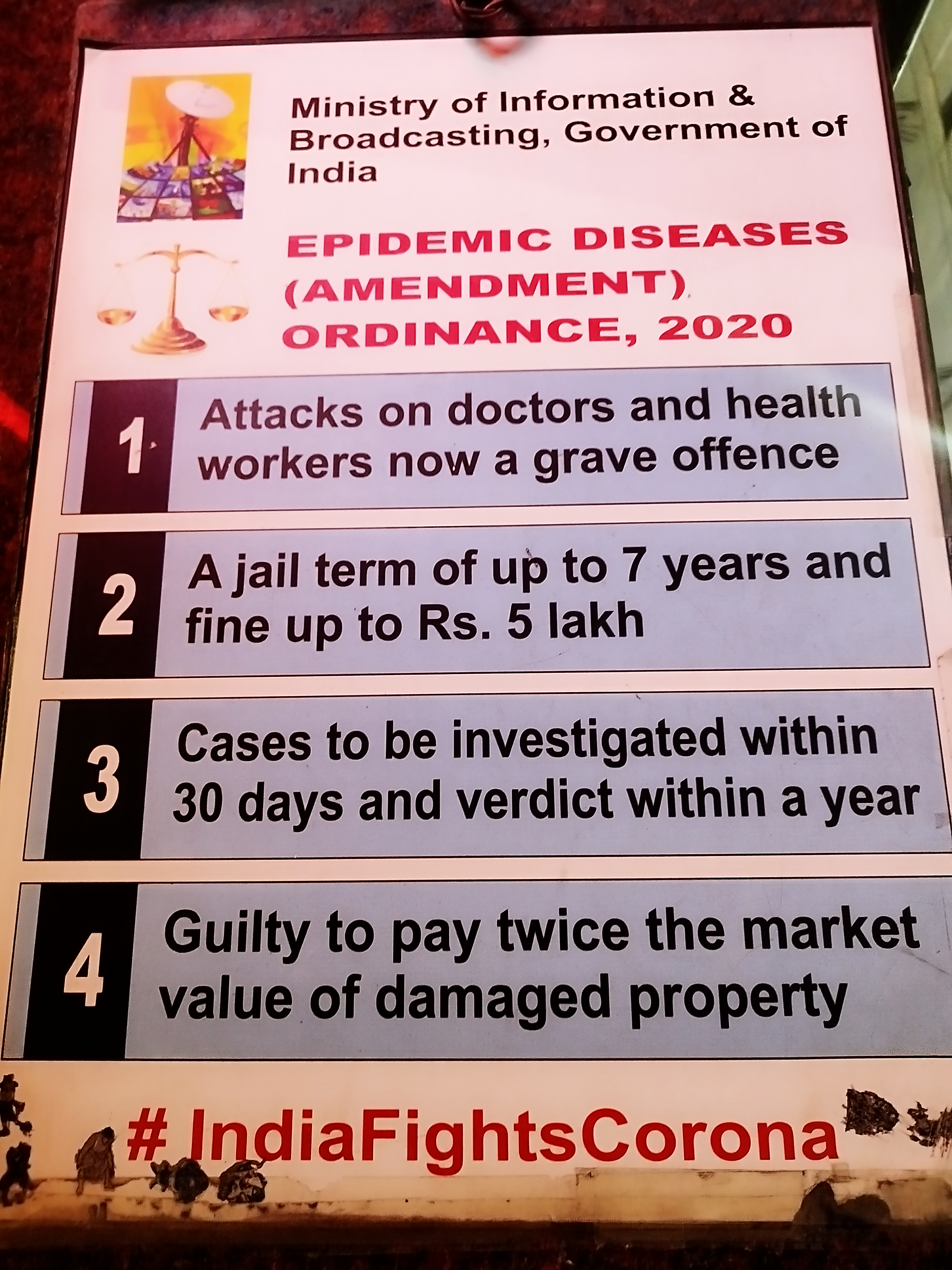
Special provisions inserted in the Epidemic Diseases Act as a result of COVID-19 spread

The Epidemic Diseases Act, 1897 and Disaster Management Act, 2005 was invoked in mid-March 2020. All commercial domestic and international flights were suspended in March. A number of cities and states announced that they would restrict public gatherings, dine-in restaurants, or order the closure of various non-essential businesses through 31 March to slow the spread of COVID-19. On 19 March 2020, Prime Minister Modi asked all Indians to observe a 14-hour Janata curfew ("people's curfew") on 22 March, and to thank essential workers by clapping or ringing bells at 5 p.m. outside their homes. The curfew was used to evaluate the feasibility of a national lockdown.

On 24 March, with 519 confirmed cases and 9 deaths in the country, the Prime Minister announced that India would be placed under a "total lockdown" for at least three weeks. All non-critical businesses and services were ordered closed except for hospitals, grocery stores, and pharmacies, and there was a "total ban" on leaving the home for non-essential purposes. All public transport was suspended.

On 16 April, districts were divided into zones using a colour-coded tier system based on incidence rates, classified as a "Red" (hotspot), "Orange", or "Green" (little to no transmission) zone. All of India's major cities fell into Red zones. Beginning 20 April, agricultural businesses and stores selling farming supplies were allowed to resume operation, as well as public works programmes, cargo transport, and banks and government centres distributing benefits. Phase 3 and 4 of the lockdown extended until 31 May, with incremental relaxations and changes. The country began a phased lifting of restrictions on 8 June. This phased lifting of restrictions continued in a series of "unlocks" which extended into November 2020.

The government was criticised for not using the lockdown to prepare the health system for when the lockdown would be lifted.

==== Second wave: State-wise and localized ====
Cities in Maharashtra such as Amravati and Nagpur started imposing curfew restrictions and lockdown measures in late February and early to mid-March 2021. On 4 April, Maharashtra imposed a weekend lockdown and night curfew among other restrictions. By early to mid-May, 35 of 36 of India's states and union territories had some form of state-wide and localised restriction. The second wave of the pandemic in India has seen no nationwide lockdown. Phased unlocking was announced starting June in Delhi, Tamil Nadu, Maharashtra, Uttar Pradesh and a number of other states.

=== Administration, committees and task forces ===
India's covid response is being guided by a number of committees, empowered groups, advisory groups and task forces. Some of these were formed before the pandemic such as the National Technical Advisory Group on Immunisation (NTAGI), "India's apex advisory body on immunization", and the Integrated Disease Surveillance Programme (IDSP) under the National Centre for Disease Control. IDSP was brought in as early as 17 January 2020. Some of these were constituted following the onset of the pandemic such as the ICMR COVID-19 Task Force. The National Expert Group on Vaccine Administration for COVID-19 (NEGVAC), formed in August 2020 would guide the national vaccine delivery strategy. In October 2020, NEGVAC advice resulted in the formation of a three-tier state level mechanism for the implementation of the vaccine strategy. The overall response has been led by the Prime Minister and his office; at least 67 review meetings have been held by it between January 2020 and May 2021.

Table of EGs, Task Forces and Committees
Formation Date	Name	Members	Notes	Ref
2020
3 Feb	Group of Ministers (GOM) on COVID-19	Chaired by Union Minister of Health and Family Welfare Harsh Vardhan	On 17 May 2021, the 26th meeting of the GOM was held.	
29 Mar	11 Empowered Groups	Representatives from the Prime Minister's Office and the cabinet secretariat. Headed by Secretary level officers, NITI Aayog members including Amitabh Kant	Set up under Disaster Management Act 2005; 11 empowered groups set up to ensure quick decision making related to the pandemic and coordinate response.	
7 April	National Task Force for COVID-19 (ICMR COVID-19 Task Force)	Headed by VK Paul, Randeep Guleria and Balram Bhargava.	Set up by ICMR; terms of reference includes "identifying research priorities, review evidence, align research with level of outbreak and response; identify and create protocol; develop concept notes and identify partners for implementation".	
14 April	Vaccine Task Force	Co-chaired by VK Paul and PSA K. VijayRaghavan	Set up by the Prime Minister's Office; until 3 May 2021, 23 meetings of the VTF have been held.	
~31 May	National COVID-19 Supermodel Committee	M Vidyasagar, Manindra Agrawal, Lt Gen Madhuri Kanitkar, Biman Bagchi, Arup Bose, Gagandeep Kang, Sankar K Pal	Set up under the Department of Science and Technology; forecasting and modelling related to the pandemic.	
12 Aug	National Expert Group on Vaccine Administration for COVID-19 (NEGVAC)	Headed by VK Paul and Union Health Secretary Rajesh Bhushan	Vaccine delivery strategy.	
14 Sep	6 Empowered Groups (reconstituted)	Headed by V.K. Paul, Guruprasad Mahapatra, Amitabh Kant, Tarun Bajaj, Ajay Bhalla	The 11 empowered groups set up on 29 March 2020 were reconstituted into 6 EGs. The groups had also undergone modification in May 2020.	
26 Oct	State Steering Committee. State/ District/ Urban/ Block Task Forces.	Chaired by Chief Secretary, Principal Secretary (Health), District Magistrate, Municipal Commissioner, SDM/ BDO respectively.	Following NEGVAC advice, the union government asked the states to form state-specific mechanisms in preparation for the implementation of the COVID-19 vaccination drive.	
25 Dec	Indian SARS-CoV-2 Consortium on Genomics (INSACOG)	Ten laboratories of Department of Biotechnology, MoST, CSIR, ICMR and MoHFW	"To monitor the genomic variations in the SARS-CoV-2 on a regular basis through a multi-laboratory network."	
2021
9 May	National Task Force	Devi Shetty, Gagandeep Kang, Naresh Trehan, Saumitra Rawat, Shiv Kumar Sarin, Zarir Udwadia	Set up by the Supreme Court of India; "to facilitate a public health response to the pandemic based on scientific and specialised domain knowledge" and oxygen related issues.	
Others: MoHFW's National Media Rapid Response Cell (NMRRC)

=== Pseudoscience practices ===
Despite no scientific evidence behind the use of animal products to boost immunity against COVID-19, some individuals sought out traditional or religiously inspired methods. One such method involved scrubbing oneself in cow dung and urine, followed by rinsing off in cow milk or buttermilk on a weekly basis at cow shelters. Other methods involved consumption of cow dung and urine. Proponents of these pseudoscience preventative methods also occasionally consumed cow urine to boost immunity against SARS-CoV-2, and some Indian healthcare professionals likewise participated in these rituals. Cow dung and urine were promoted as effective treatment for COVID-19 by many religious leaders, medical professionals, other key opinion leaders, and government officials.

=== Military ===
The Indian military has supported the Indian government's response during the pandemic. During the second wave, some of the steps taken by the Indian military to help the fight against the pandemic includes setting up of COVID facilities, setting up of oxygen PSA plants, providing domestic and international air and water transport assistance, providing medical assistance to civilians, providing nursing assistance and truck drivers, providing support to centre and states as requested, roping in retired military medics, providing manpower with specialised skills, and roping in the National Cadet Corps. The three armed forces were functioning under Operation CO-JEET. Operation Samudra Setu 1 which was officially conducted between 5 May 2020 and 8 July 2020 and focused on repatriation; and Samudra Setu 2 in 2021 focused on oxygen related transport.

=== Private sector ===
In March–April 2020, several companies and organisations donated masks and other pandemic related supplies. Several large business groups contributed to the PM CARES Fund. Leading Indian corporates have come forward to provide support to hospitals across the country. This includes procuring, setting up and maintaining cryogenic tanks, medical equipment and ventilators. Business leaders in India have also set up COVID-19 facilities. The chief executive officers of 40 US companies set up a global task force to collaborate on procuring equipment to support India. Ola is providing doorstep delivery of medical oxygen.

=== International ===
==== International support ====
The Indian government provided around 65.5 million doses of covid vaccines to 95 countries between 20 January 2021 and late March 2021. 10.5 million doses were gifted while the remaining were commercial and COVAX obligations.

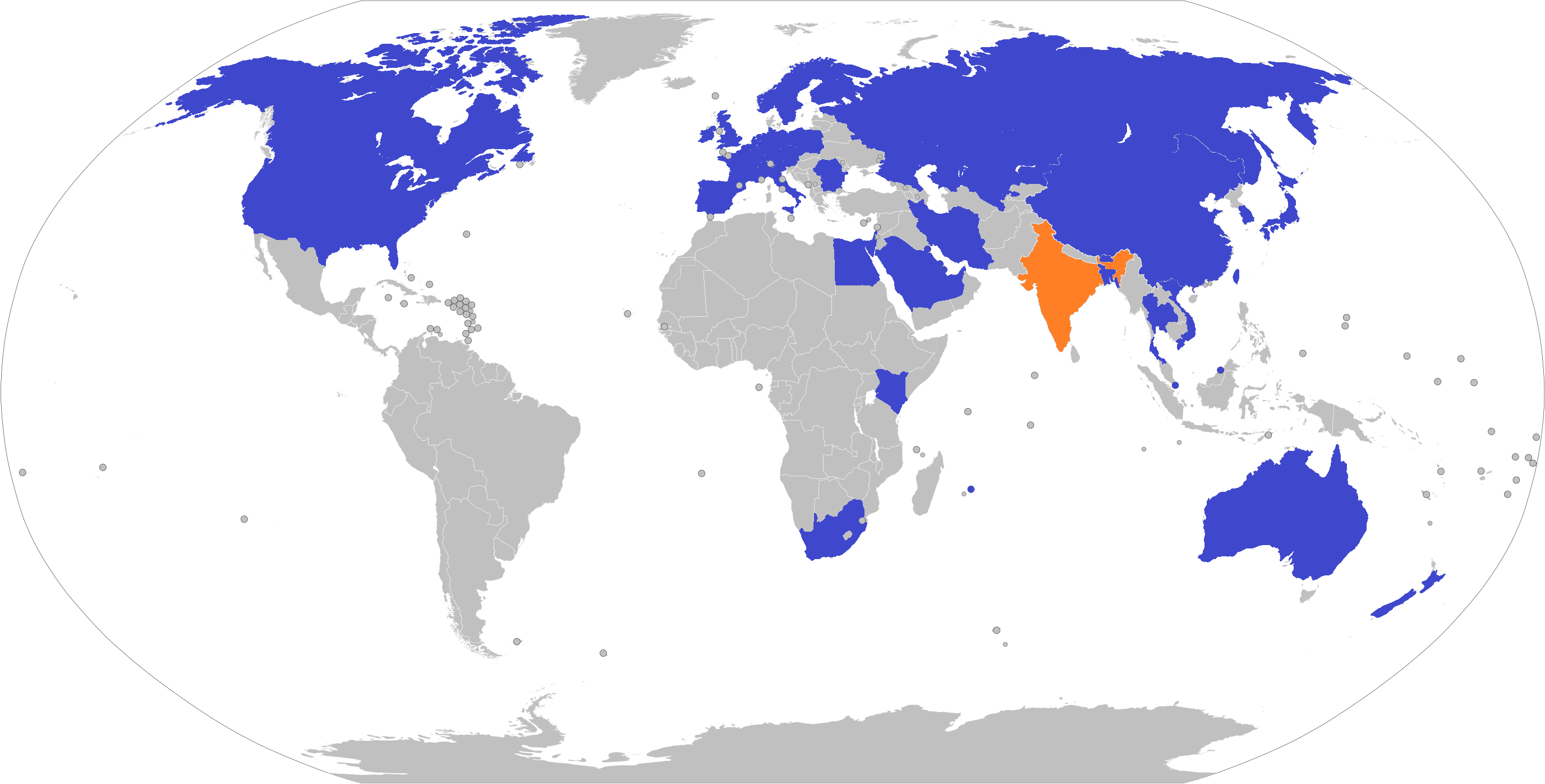
International support to India during the second wave

International support has been provided to India since the beginning of the pandemic in 2020. In late April 2021, international relief being transported to India increased. European countries such as France, Ireland, Belgium, Romania, Luxembourg, Portugal and Sweden sent pandemic related aid such as oxygen concentrators, ventilators and medicines. France and Germany also sent oxygen plants; Germany also sent 12 army paramedics to operate the plants. Oxygen related equipment was shipped from Bahrain, Thailand, Singapore, Saudi Arabia and the United Kingdom. Russia, United States of America and UNICEF sent various relief material including oxygen producing units. In April 2021 Taiwan sent 150 oxygen machines to India. The oxygen machines had been purchased by the Taiwanese government and modified for India's electrical voltage. Other countries to have provided support include Bhutan, Bangladesh, Kuwait, Kenya, Turkiye, Switzerland, Poland, Netherlands and Israel. On 5 May 2021, Indian External Affairs Minister said that "What you describe as aid, we call friendship" in response to foreign support during the pandemic. On 16 April, China sent 650,000 testing kits to India, but their use was discontinued in view of a very low accuracy.

There were international concerns related to how the support being sent to India is being used. By 5 May India had received 5,769,442 items in aid. Support between 27 April and 14 May included "10,796 oxygen concentrators, 12,269 oxygen cylinders; 19 oxygen generation plants; 6,497 ventilators, more than 4.2 lakh Remdesivir vials". The government released the institutions and the states to which the support had been sent.

=== Response shortages and criticism ===
The role of the National Centre for Disease Control during the COVID-19 pandemic has been questioned including the subdued sharing of data collected by the IDSP. Disease surveillance in India through IDSP faces perpetual shortage of funds and manpower resulting in a weak nationwide data collection system. The IDSP does not track deaths taking place outside hospitals, or deaths due to COVID-19 of those not tested, one of the many reasons under-counting is built into the system. The lack of epidemiologists in senior decision-making positions of COVID-19 related committees has been evident, including the absence of state-level epidemiologists in a number of states. In April 2020, the health ministry asked states to go on a hiring spree and fill vacancies for epidemiologists. Indian Council of Medical Research has been criticised for did not updating the "treatment protocol for COVID-19" between July 2020 and April 2021. The "National Task Force for COVID-19" did not meet during February and March despite members claiming it was obvious a second wave was in the making. A number of warnings pertaining to a surge in cases in March, shortages in life-saving equipment and a second wave were downsized and went unheeded. A number of problems were found with the forecasting and modelling by the National COVID-19 Supermodel Committee by independent commentators. In early May 2021, the committee said that they had not been able to predict the second wave accurately. A lot of problems with India's failing response to the second wave was the general and long term issues of the public health system in India.

== Evacuations by India related to the COVID-19 pandemic ==
Throughout the COVID-19 pandemic, the central and state governments of India coordinated numerous international and domestic evacuations.

=== Background ===
==== COVID-19 pandemic ====
SARS-CoV-2 was first identified in the city of Wuhan, Hubei, China in mid-December 2019, when a group of people developed a pneumonia without clear causes, and existing treatments were found to be ineffective. SARS-CoV-2 has similar characteristics to severe acute respiratory syndrome (SARS) and Middle East respiratory syndrome (MERS), with the resulting disease being named COVID-19. Within a number of weeks, several thousand people in Hubei's provincial capital of Wuhan were infected, and the Chinese central government imposed strict containment measures, including a lockdown of Hubei itself.

As the virus spread worldwide, more countries also instilled their own lockdowns and put travel restrictions into place. In response, many nations evacuated their citizens as well as other nationals to transport them home. India was no exception: to control the COVID-19 pandemic in the country, all visas were suspended from 13 March and international flights were suspended nine days later from 22 March. India had started a national lockdown on 25 March, which restricted the movement of people in the country.

==== Migration ====
The Indian diaspora is the largest in the world, with the UN estimating their size at 17.5 million in 2019. The Ministry of External Affairs has higher figures, with the number of Non-resident Indians or NRIs (Indian citizens who do not live in the country on a regular-enough basis to pay income tax) alone being over 13 million. In addition, India also has a substantial population of internal migrant workers, with Reuters estimating that there are 100 million such workers.

==== Previous evacuations ====
India has conducted several large-scale evacuations in modern times, particularly in the Middle East where there is a high concentration of Indians and several conflicts in recent history. The 1990 airlift of Indians from Kuwait has been recognized as the world's largest civilian airlift, with over 110,000 people evacuated. Domestically, Operation Rahat, which the Indian Air Force claimed was the biggest civilian helicopter evacuation ever, airlifted over 19,600 people from Uttarakhand and Himachal Pradesh during the 2013 North India floods.

=== International ===
==== January–April 2020 ====
After the lockdown in Hubei, the government owned flag carrier Air India flew to Wuhan to evacuate Indian citizens, particularly students, stranded there. As cases spiked in Italy and Iran, the latter country of which some pilgrims had been stuck in, efforts were shifted to evacuate Indians from Milan (where Air India already flew before the pandemic) and Iranian cities. These flights were free for passengers.

Departure date	Evacuees	Nationalities (Note: If all passengers were Indian nationals, no other note is made.)	Departure airport	Arrival airport	Notes
1 February 2020	324	(India) 324	(China) Wuhan Tianhe International Airport	Indira Gandhi International Airport	This was India's first evacuation flight. There were three minors, 211 students and 110 working professionals, and the flight was operated by Air India.
2 February 2020	330	(India) 323 (Maldives) 7	(China) Wuhan Tianhe International Airport	Indira Gandhi International Airport	This was India's second flight. All passengers were quarantined in Delhi and Manesar, Haryana.
27 February 2020	111	(India) 76 (Bangladesh) 23 (China) 6 (Myanmar) 2 (Maldives) 2 (South Africa) 1 (United States) 1 (Madagascar) 1	(China) Wuhan Tianhe International Airport	Indira Gandhi International Airport	This was the third evacuation flight sent by India to Wuhan. India also provided 15 tonnes of medical assistance comprising masks, gloves and other emergency medical equipment to China through the same Indian Air Force flight.
27 February 2020	124	(India) 119 (Sri Lanka) 2 (Nepal) 1 (South Africa) 1 (Peru) 1	(Japan) Tokyo Narita International Airport	Indira Gandhi International Airport	This flight mostly had crew members of the Diamond Princess as passengers.
10 March 2020	58	(India) 58	(Iran) Tehran (unknown airport)	Hindon Airport	The Indian Air Force used a C-17 Globemaster transport aircraft to evacuate Indian pilgrims from Iran.
11 March 2020	83	(India) 74 (Italy) 6 (United States) 3	(Italy) Milan Malpensa Airport	Indira Gandhi International Airport	The flight was operated by Air India. All the non-Indian citizens were of Indian origin. All evacuees were placed under quarantine for 14 days.
15 March 2020	218	(India) 218	(Italy) Milan Malpensa Airport	Indira Gandhi International Airport	Air India operated the flight. The evacuees brought to New Delhi will be shifted to Indo-Tibetan Border Police's camp in Chhawla area where they will be quarantined for 14 days.
15 March 2020	234	(India) 234	(Iran) Tehran Imam Khomeini International Airport	Chhatrapati Shivaji International Airport	131 students and 103 pilgrims, among others, were evacuated from Iran on a Mahan Air flight organized by the Indian Embassy. They were quarantined for 14 days in Indian Army's wellness centre facility in Jaisalmer.
16 March 2020	53	(India) 53	(Iran) Tehran and Shiraz Tehran Imam Khomeini International Airport	Jaisalmer Airport	52 students and 1 teacher were evacuated by Air India and were then quarantined at an Army Wellness Centre in Jaisalmer.
22 March 2020	263	(India) 263	(Italy) Rome Leonardo da Vinci–Fiumicino Airport	Indira Gandhi International Airport	Evacuated by Air India from Rome, Italy, and then were quarantined at Indo-Tibetan Border Police's camp near Delhi.
29 March 2020	275	(India) 275	(Iran) Tehran Imam Khomeini International Airport	Jodhpur Airport	After preliminary screening, they were quarantined at Army Wellness Centre Jodhpur.

==== May 2020–present: Vande Bharat Mission ====
The Indian government initiated a massive evacuation program called "Vande Bharat Mission" on 7 May 2020. This involved flights via Air India and its low-cost arm Air India Express. In the first three phases of the mission, the government did not allow private airlines to participate, though they have been allowed to participate in the fourth phase onwards. The government continues to set the fare, determine the routes and decide the number of flights.

Over 67,000 evacuation requests were registered by MEA by 8 May; twenty days later, the number of registrations had increased to over 300,000. It was initially predicted that the total number of civilians evacuated could surpass the Kuwait airlift, with estimates ranging from 192,000 to 250,000. On 6 August, the MEA declared that almost 950,000 Indians were repatriated.

As well as evacuating Indian nationals back to the country, certain flights will also evacuate anyone who wants to leave, provided they are a national, permanent resident, or have a visa valid for at least one year. Unlike previous evacuations, passengers have to pay for their journey, with fares ranging from ₹15,000 (US$160) for the Gulf states to ₹100,000 (US$1,100) for the United States.

==== Phase I ====
Phase one, which was conducted from 7–17 May, mostly targeted areas with high concentrations of Indians. It was predicted that this phase would feature a total of 64 flights, half of which were for the Gulf states, as well as two naval ships for Indians in the Maldives under the label "Samudra Setu" (Sea Bridge). The MEA gave a higher number of 84 flights, which may have been due to counting domestic connections on the same plane as a separate flight. As of 15 May, All India Radio reported that 56 flights had been conducted.

Departure date	Inbound evacuees	Outbound evacuees (Note: The Indian media is focusing mostly on those returning to India, so outbound counts may go mostly unreported.)	Foreign destination	Indian destination	Notes
7 May 2020	177	—	(United Arab Emirates) Abu Dhabi International Airport	Cochin International Airport	First flight under the mission. Three passengers on the flight to Kochi later tested positive for COVID-19.
7 May 2020	177	—	(United Arab Emirates) Dubai International Airport	Calicut International Airport	A substantial portion of passengers were pregnant women, stranded infants, and elderly persons taken on humanitarian grounds.
7–8 May 2020	234	0	Singapore Changi International Airport	Indira Gandhi International Airport	The flight to Delhi, AI 381, was slightly delayed. Hotels throughout Delhi were prepared to quarantine the evacuees.
12 May 2020	177/179	—	(United Arab Emirates) Dubai International Airport	Mangalore International Airport	20 passengers later tested positive for the virus.

- On 9 May, Air India flight carrying 129 passengers from Dhaka, Bangladesh landed at Delhi airport. Air India flight with 180 Indians from Sharjah reached Lucknow. Air India flight from Kuwait with 163 adults and four infants landed in Hyderabad with 163 nationals on board. Also 177 Indians from Kuala Lumpur reach Trichy in Tamil Nadu. The second flight from Singapore, landed at Mumbai with 243 Indians. 180 Indian nationals including three children from Dubai arrived at Chennai.
- On 10 May, INS Jalashwa, with 700 Indian nationals from the Maldives arrived at the Kochi Port. This was an operation of the Indian Navy called Operation Samudra Setu.
- On 10 May, 326 Indian nationals from London, landed at the Chhatrapati Shivaji Maharaj International Airport in Mumbai. 177 passengers from Kuala Lumpur landed at Kochi. 117 Indians from Kuwait landed at Chennai.
- On 11 May, 323 Indians from London landed at Bangalore. 118 Indians stranded in San Francisco landed at Hyderabad. Air India flight 1387 carrying Indians from Manila arrived in Mumbai.

==== Phase II ====
This phase started on 17 May and ended on 10 June. (Note: This is based on the Air India schedule; other sources, including the MEA, have given different timeframes.) The scope of evacuations was expanded to cover more European and Central Asian countries. It is planned that over 30,000 Indian nationals will be brought back to India through 149 flights from 40 countries in this phase.

Departure date	Inbound evacuees	Outbound evacuees	Foreign destination	Indian destination	Notes
28 May 2020	230 (est.)	—	Bangladesh	Tripura; Assam; Meghalaya	Evacuation done over land.

==== Phase III ====
This phase started on 11 June with scheduling over 300 flights from 50 countries. This phase is planned to include private airlines.

==== Phase IV ====
The fourth phase of Vande Bharat Mission will start on 3 July. This phase will be mainly focused on Gulf Countries and Singapore, Thailand and Malaysia. A total of 1050 flights will be scheduled. Out of the 1050 flights, 750 flights will be operated by Indian-based private airlines and rest of them will be operated by Air India Express. Air India will commence phase 4 on 4 July. Air India will operate additional flights from India to Europe and the United States from 22 July 2020 to 31 July 2020 under Vande Bharat Mission

==== Phase V ====
The 5th phase began on 1 August 2020 until 31 August 2020, with over 700 flights to 53 countries planned. Air India operated more flights to the United States, France, Germany, the United Kingdom, the UAE and more. Out of these flights, was ill-fated Air India Express Flight 1344, which crashed and killed 21 aboard.

==== Phase VI ====
The Phase 6 of Vande Bharat Mission has start on 1 September and India has operated a total of 1059 flights from Afghanistan, Bahrain, Cambodia, Canada, China, France, Germany, Jordan, Kuwait, Malaysia, Maldives, Oman, Qatar, Saudi Arabia, Singapore, Thailand, UAE, UK and USA.

==== Phase VII ====
The phase 7 of the Vande Bharat mission was operationalized in Oct 2020 and more than 1000 international flights have been scheduled from 19 countries under this phase during the course of October. Under the phase 7 of Vande Bharat Mission India has operated flights from Australia, Bahrain, Canada, France, Germany, Israel, Japan, Kenya, Kuwait, Malaysia, Maldives, Myanmar, Nigeria, Oman, Qatar, Singapore, UAE, UK and USA.

==== Samudra Setu II ====
In support of the nation's fight against COVID-19 and as part of operation 'Samudra Setu II', seven Indian Naval ships viz. Kolkata, Kochi, Talwar, Tabar, Trikand, Jalashwa and Airavat have been deployed for shipment of liquid medical oxygen-filled cryogenic containers and associated medical equipment from various countries.

INS Kolkata and INS Talwar, mission deployed in Persian Gulf, were the first batch of ships that were immediately diverted for the task and entered port of Manama, Bahrain on 30 April 2021.

INS Talwar, with 40 MT Liquid Medical Oxygen (LMO) embarked, is headed back home.

INS Kolkata has proceeded to Doha, Qatar for embarking medical supplies and will subsequently head to Kuwait for embarking Liquid Oxygen tanks.

Similarly, on the Eastern seaboard, INS Airavat too has been diverted for the task, while INS Jalashwa, the LPD which played a key role during op Samudra Setu last year was pulled out of maintenance, readied and sailed out to augment the effort.

INS Airavat is scheduled to enter Singapore for embarking Liquid oxygen tanks and INS Jalashwa is standing by in the region to embark medical stores at short notice.

The second batch of ships comprising Kochi, Trikand and Tabar mission deployed in Arabian sea have also been diverted to join the national effort.

=== Domestic ===
According to Indian Railways, over 1,000,000 migrant workers along with their families were taken home on Shramik Special (shramik is Hindi for "labour") trains. For the most part, state governments are taking responsibility to arrange the travel of workers back home. The state of Uttarakhand, a huge source of migrant workers, has had 130,000 applications from residents wishing to get back home.

=== Reception ===
The fees levied to passengers have presented a significant barrier to Indians who want to evacuate but did not have enough money to go home. For example, in both the Middle East and domestically in India, migrant workers have not been paid for several weeks, making it difficult for them to afford evacuation flights, trains, and buses. Passengers also raised complaints about inadequate payment and reservation infrastructure for the Vande Bharat mission, with worries about security and the 30-minute time limit to pay.

The mission notably excluded the state of West Bengal. In response, a state minister accused the MEA of discrimination, while Piyush Goyal claimed that the state government had not confirmed quarantine arrangements and that 3,700 people had registered to return there. A couple days later, an evacuation flight from Dhaka, Bangladesh to the state capital Kolkata was confirmed.

The plight of domestic migrant workers in particular caught the attention of media across the world, as the lockdown meant that they could not return home easily after losing their jobs and images of workers walking to their native places became widespread. Negative comparisons have been made between the situation of many domestic migrants and Indians abroad: Shekhar Gupta criticized the media and Narendra Modi for focusing on the Vande Bharat Mission and thus the more affluent at the expense of the working class, and some politicians criticised the central government for not focusing on migrant workers enough.

After March, minors born abroad with OCI status or Indian visas were not allowed to travel with their Indian citizen parents back to India due to the earlier suspension of all visas for the country. In response, some MEA officials have proposed allowing some OCIs to be eligible for the flights as well.

=== Incidents ===
==== Air India Express Flight 1344 ====
One of the flights under the mission, Air India Express Flight 1344 from Dubai International Airport to Calicut International Airport, skidded off the runway and crashed into a gorge, killing 21 out of the 190 people on board.

==== Air India Flight AI-312 27-Aug Fiasco ====
On 26 August, Indians including women and children were not allowed to board the Air India flight AI-312 to Incheon (South Korea) at the Indira Gandhi International Airport (New Delhi) without prior information. More than 180 Indian passengers bought ticket to fly from India to Korea to join their families, universities and jobs.

These passengers reached Delhi airport from different cities of India. But hours before the boarding they were informed that they are not allowed to board the flight due to some approval issues with South Korea. All passengers were forced to return to their home cities.

== Impact ==
=== Displacement of migrant workers ===
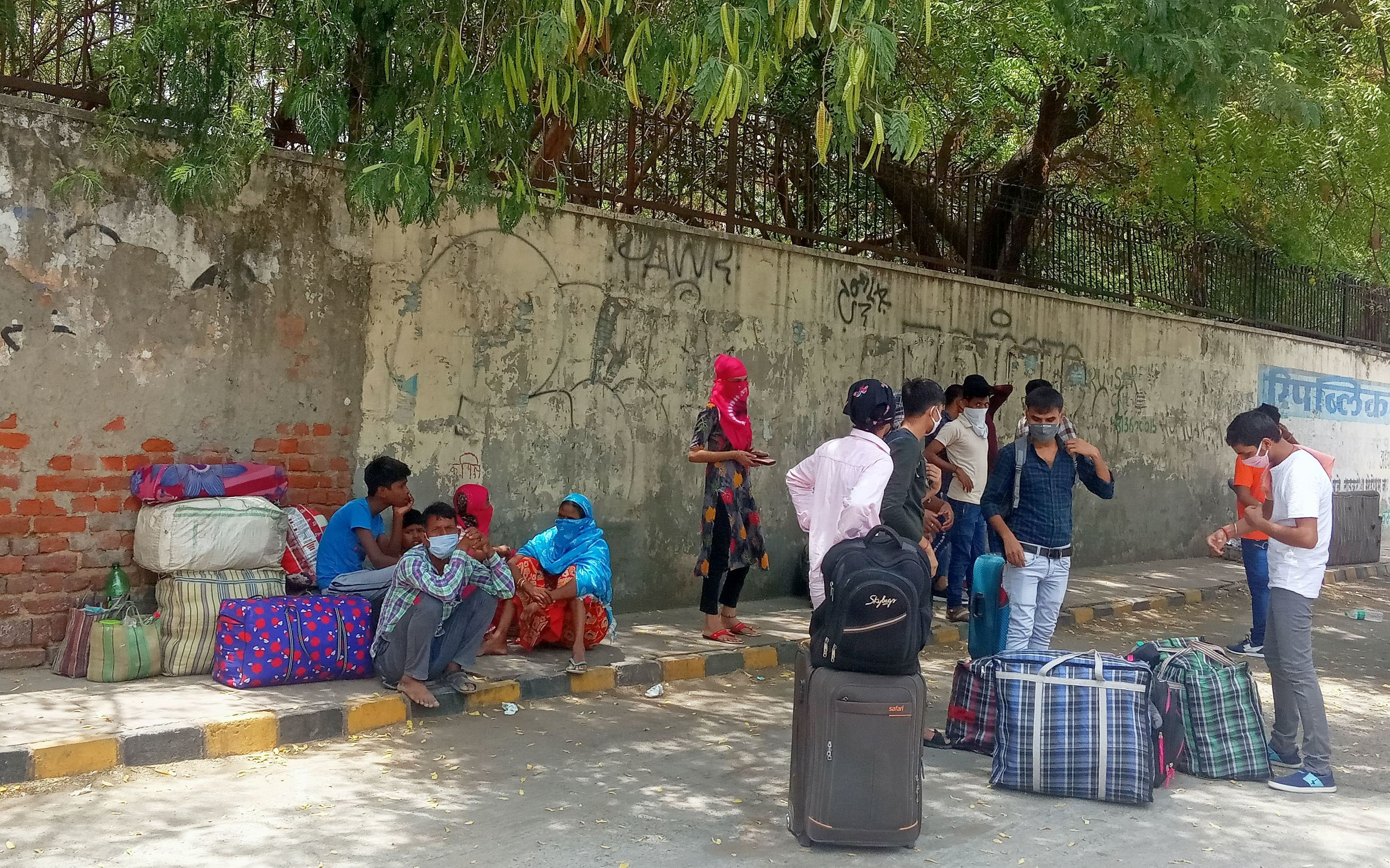
Stranded migrant workers during fourth phase of lockdown in Delhi

The 2020 lockdown left tens of millions of migrant workers unemployed. With factories and workplaces shut down, many migrant workers were left with no livelihood. They thus decided to walk hundreds of kilometres to go back to their native villages, accompanied by their families in many cases. In response, the central and state governments took various measures to help them. The central government then announced that it had asked state governments to set up immediate relief camps for the migrant workers returning to their native states, and later issued orders protecting the rights of the migrants.

In its report to the Supreme Court of India on 30 March 2020, the central government stated that the migrant workers, apprehensive about their survival, moved in the panic created by fake news that the lockdown would last for more than three months. In early May, the central government permitted the Indian Railways to launch "Shramik Special" trains for the migrant workers and others stranded, but this move had its own complications. On 26 May, the Supreme Court admitted that the problems of the migrants had still not been solved and ordered the Centre and States to provide free food, shelter and transport to stranded migrant workers.

=== Drug shortages ===
In January 2020, Indian pharma companies raised the issue that drug supplies could be hit if the pandemic situation in China became worse. India sources about 70% of its pharmaceutical ingredients from China. In March 2020, India restricted export of 26 pharmaceutical ingredients; this restriction pointed to impending global shortages. During the second wave of the pandemic in India shortages of certain drugs caused some COVID-19 patients to go to the black market. In April 2021, other important COVID-19 related drugs also faced lowered stocks and sharp rise in cost of raw materials.

=== Education ===
On 16 March 2020, the union government ordered the closure of schools and colleges. On 18 March, Central Board of Secondary Education (CBSE) released revised guidelines for examination centers incorporating social distancing measures. On 19 March, CBSE and JEE examinations for the Indian Institutes of Technology and other engineering college admissions were postponed. States across the country postponed or cancelled school examinations; younger students were either automatically promoted or promoted based on prior performance. The Union Public Service Commission also postponed the interview for the Civil Services Examination. Only a few educational institutions in India have been able to effectively adapt to e-learning and remote learning; the digital divide is further impacted by serious electricity issues and lack of internet connectivity.

=== Economy ===
Due to limited social movement restrictions during the second wave relative to lockdown measures during the first wave, the economic impact of the second wave to date is less severe than that of the first wave. Socio-economic indicators such as power demand, labour participation, and railway freight traffic fell less during the second wave as compared to the first wave. The first wave has strengthened domestic economic resilience, visible during the second wave, despite the severity of the second wave. The Indian Finance Ministry, in their Monthly Economic Review for April 2021 released on 7 May 2021, wrote that "economic activity has learnt to operate 'with Covid'". Since the beginning of the pandemic in India, poverty has increased, and livelihoods have been affected. The Reserve Bank of India (RBI) had projected a Gross Domestic Product (GDP) growth rate of 6.2% during 2019–2020, whereas after the outbreak of COVID-19, the RBI revised the expected growth GDP downwards to 4.8%, indicating that the Indian economy has received a severe negative impact due to the pandemic.

A study by the Azim Premji University in May 2021 found that women who were in the workforce before the pandemic were seven times more likely to be laid off than men. And when it came to those who had already lost their jobs, women were 11 times more likely than men not to return to work.

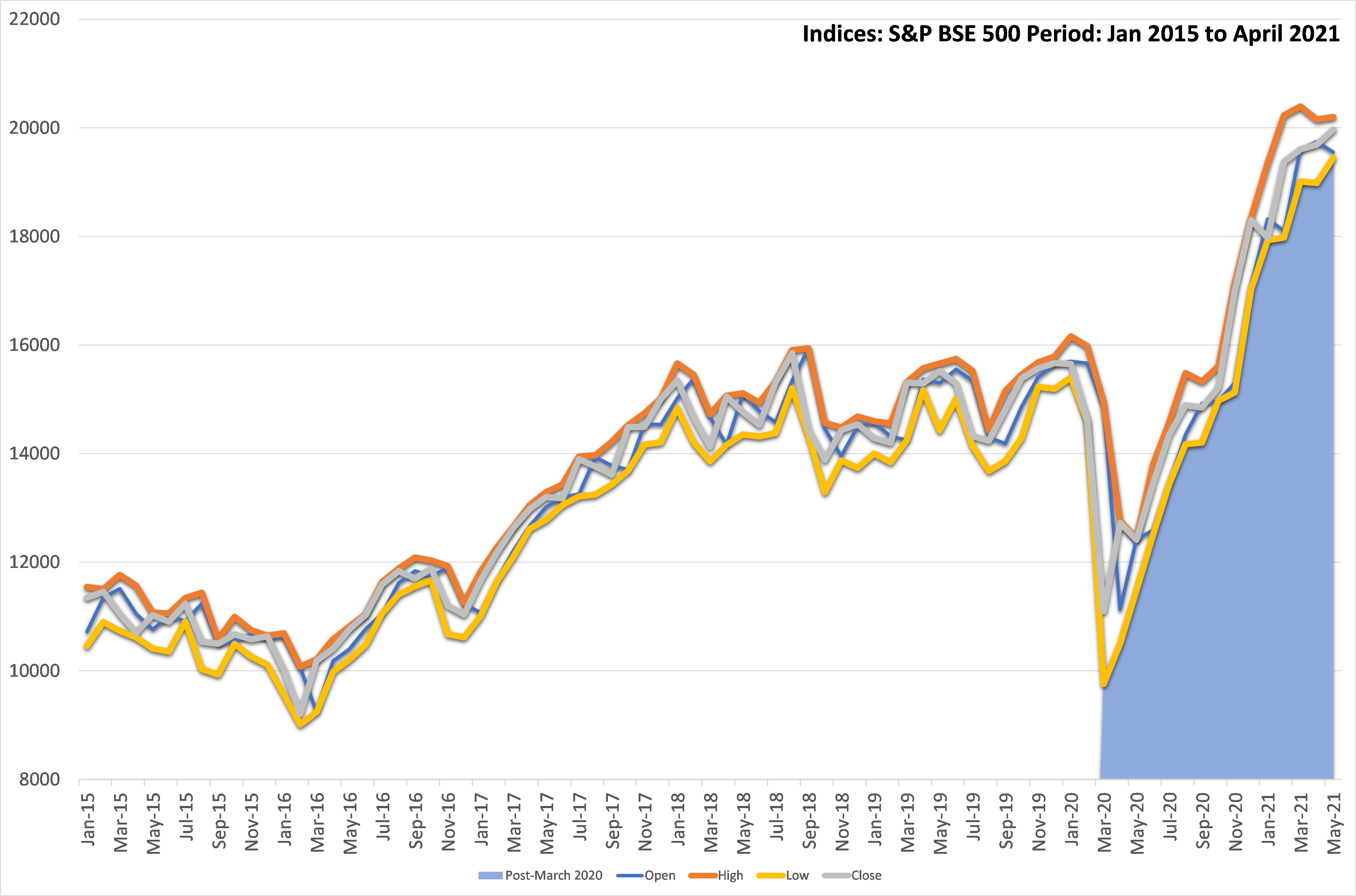
Indices: S&P Bombay Stock Exchange (BSE) 500 (1 January 2015 to 1 April 2021). Post March 2020 is highlighted in blue.

Indian stock markets witnessed a flash crash on 2 March 2020 on the back of the Union Health Ministry's announcement of two new confirmed cases. On 12 March 2020, Indian stock markets suffered their worst crash since June 2017 after WHO's declaration of the outbreak as a pandemic. On 23 March 2020, stock markets in India posted its worst losses in history. SENSEX fell 4000 points (13.15%) and NSE NIFTY fell 1150 points (12.98%). However, on 25 March 2020, one day after a complete 21-day lock-down was announced by the Prime Minister, SENSEX posted its biggest gains in over a decade. The domestic stock markets have been in a positive rally from October 2020 to April 2021.

=== Freedom of expression ===
During the COVID-19 pandemic, restrictions imposed under public health and emergency measures had implications for freedom of assembly in India. In July 2020, the International Commission of Jurists (ICJ) and the World Organisation Against Torture highlighted concerns raised in a United Nations Special Rapporteur's report regarding the use of emergency powers to impose broad prohibitions on peaceful protests and assemblies. The organisations noted that restrictions on public gatherings introduced during the pandemic should comply with international legal standards of legality, necessity, and proportionality, and cautioned against the use of public health measures to unduly suppress peaceful dissent. They emphasised that the right to freedom of peaceful assembly remains protected under international human rights law even during states of emergency.

On 25 April 2021 the government confirmed that it had made an emergency order requiring at least 100 social media posts to be removed by Facebook, Instagram, and Twitter, which included posts that it believed were misinformation, inducing panic among the public, or obstructing the response to the pandemic. This included critical tweets by West Bengal Minister of Labour and Law Moloy Ghatak, filmmaker and journalist Vinod Kapri, MP Revanth Reddy, and actor Viineet Kumar.

On 30 April 2021, in a suo moto case regarding the government's response to the pandemic, a Supreme Court of India bench headed by Justice Dhananjaya Y. Chandrachud commented on "free flow of information" and equated its restriction to contempt of court, "There should be free flow of information; we should hear voices of citizens. This is a national crisis. There should not be any presumption that the grievances raised on the internet are always false.[...] there should not be any kind of clampdown."

On 21 May 2021, the Ministry of Electronics and Information Technology ordered social media outlets to remove all content that "names, refers to, or implies [an] 'Indian variant' of coronavirus", under the justification that it is misinformation because the World Health Organization does not officially recognise or use the term in relation to Lineage B.1.617.

=== Other diseases ===
Data
Comparison of month-wise tuberculosis (TB) notification
between 2019 and 2020 in India.

The attention given to fighting COVID-19 caused a reduction in attention given to other diseases such as tuberculosis, resulting in ten of thousands of deaths. This has also caused a set-back to the fight against tuberculosis by over a decade. The fall in tuberculosis registrations in the country fell 24% from 2019 to 2020 due to pandemic related issues. Immunisation programs have been impacted, operations postponed and neglected and institutional delivery of babies decreased during the lockdown in 2020.

=== Healthcare and frontline workers ===
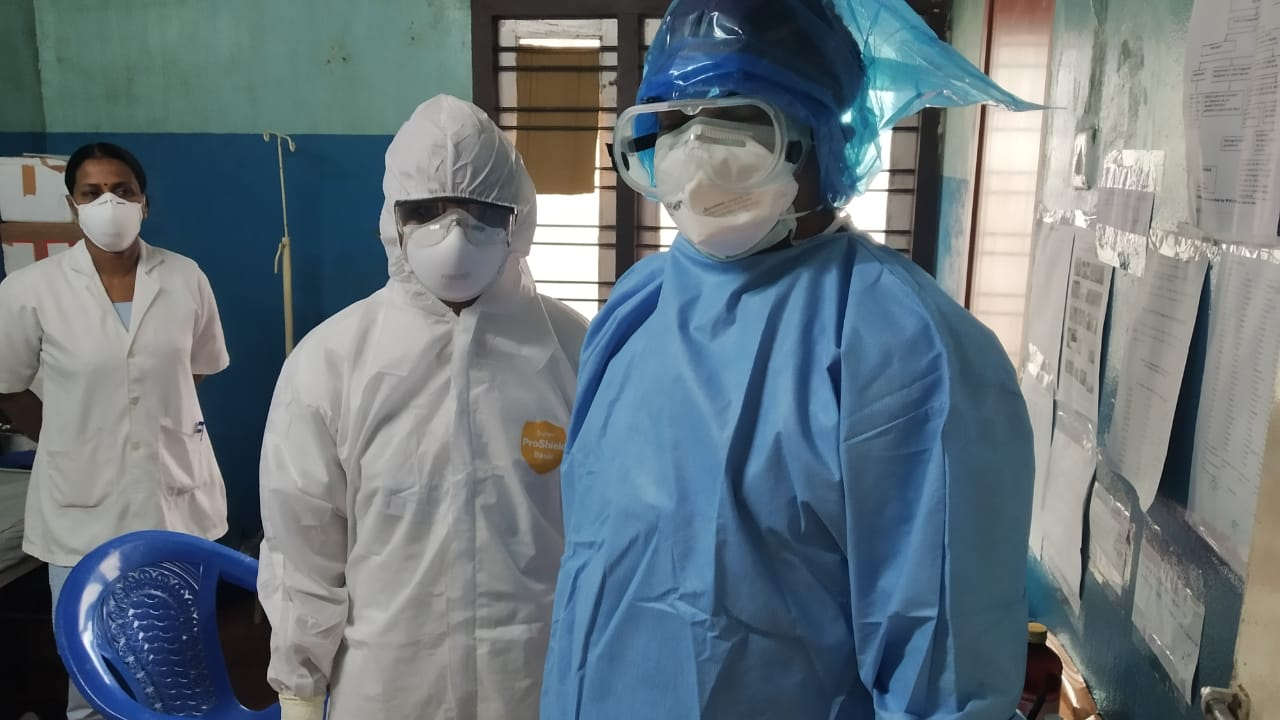
Healthcare workers in Kerala during the pandemic

On 8 August 2020, Indian Medical Association (IMA) announced that 198 doctors had died due to COVID-19. This number was increased to 515 by October 2020, and 734 by 3 February 2021. However, on 2 and 5 February 2021 the health ministry announced in the Rajya Sabha and Lok Sabha respectively that 162/174 doctors, 107/116 nurses and 44 ASHA workers/199 healthcare workers had died due to COVID-19. The figures were based on the governments "Insurance Scheme for Health Workers fighting COVID-19". As of 17 April 2021, IMA put the number of deaths of doctors at 747. Ten of thousands of doctors, nurses and health workers have been infected with covid. Healthcare workers followed by frontline workers in India were provided with covid vaccinations first, starting from 16 January 2021. This included 9,616,697 healthcare workers and 14,314,563 frontline workers; by May 2021 a majority of these had also been given their second dose.

As per June 2021 figures of IMA, 776 doctors have died from COVID-19. Karnataka Government announces plan to construct a COVID-19 Memorial.

=== Religion ===
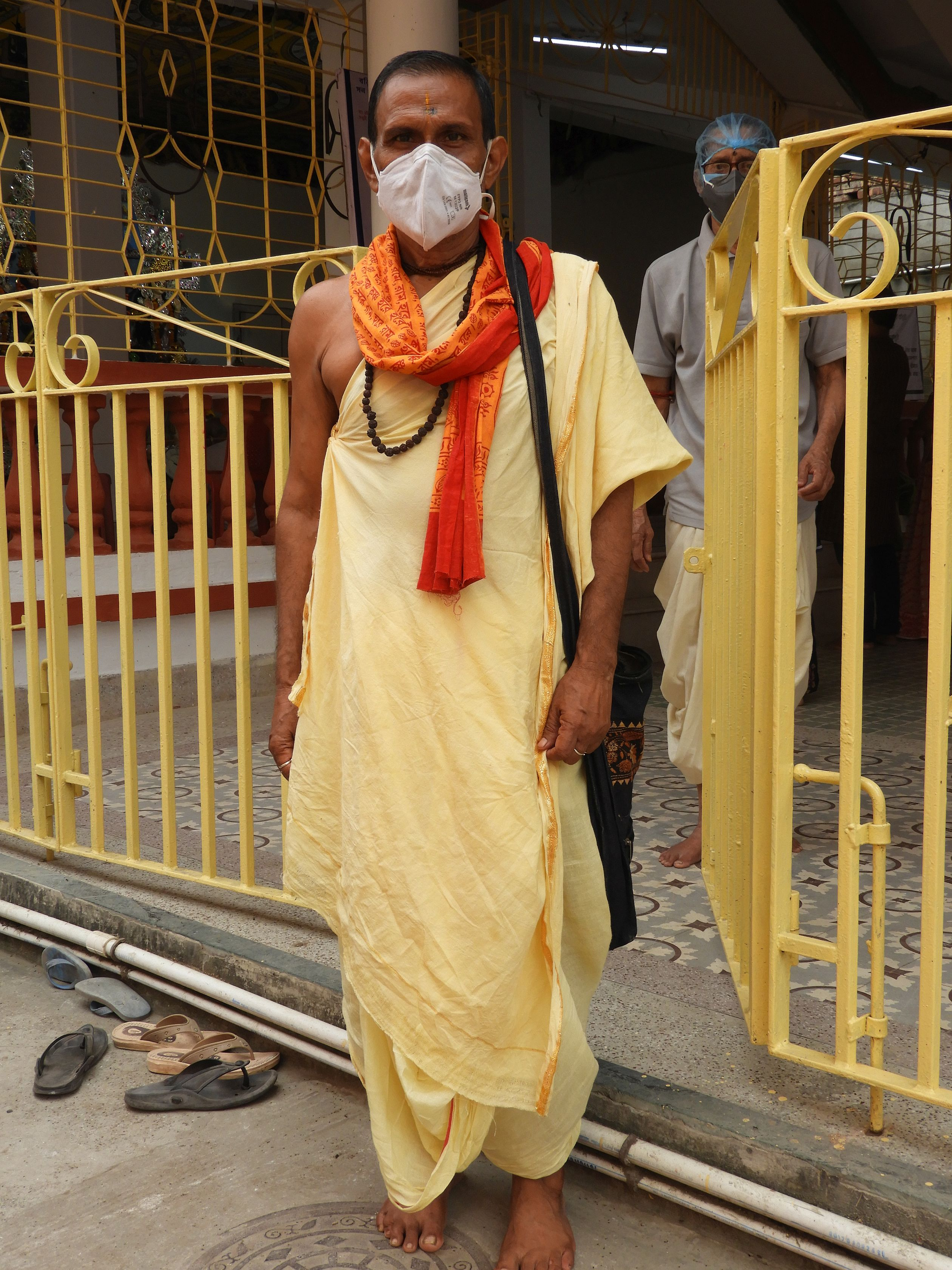
A priest during Durga Puja in Kolkata, October 2020

On 4 March 2020, the Prime Minister tweeted that he would not be participating in Holi programmes due to COVID-19. The pandemic and subsequent lockdown resulted in numerous religious festivals being largely celebrated within homes or seeing less than normal public turnouts adhering to social distancing guidelines. The Char Dham was conducted in a controlled manner; in 2020 pilgrims numbered 400,000 while the previous year had seen 3,800,000 pilgrims. Many religious institutions adapted and connected to their devotees via livestreaming, radio and television. Purported super-spreader events of a religious nature included the 2020 Tablighi Jamaat COVID-19 hotspot in Delhi, and the 2021 Haridwar Kumbh Mela. The state of Uttarakhand, where the Kumbh took place, saw an 1800% increase in COVID-19 transmission during the period when Kumbh was held. 2021 saw numerous religious events ignoring social distancing guidelines such as Holi and Eid.

=== Rural and semi-rural India ===
Over 70% of India's population, i.e. over 740 million people in India, live in rural areas. The share of COVID cases in rural and semi-rural India increased from 40% in mid-July 2020 to 67% in August 2020. This increase in covid cases was largely attributed to the movement of COVID infected migrant workers from urban areas back to their native villages. Issues aggravating the situation in rural and semi-rural areas include a severe lack of human resources in the health field. The second wave also saw migrants coming back from urbans areas, indicated by the sharp rise in employment generation through MGNREGS. By May 2021, more than half the cases in Maharashtra and Uttar Pradesh were from rural areas. Another indicator of the situation in villages is the rush of villagers to semi-urban and urban areas in search of healthcare, "about 30–35 per cent of the patients in hospitals in Bhopal are from villages and small towns located within a 200 km radius. It's the same story in Indore." On 16 May 2021 a UP government official confirmed the report that corpses of people who died from the virus in the rural areas had been dumped in the Ganges River due to lack of funds. Following this report, the UP state government announced that it will pay ₹5,000 (equivalent to ₹6,100 or US$65 in 2026) to poor families to cremate or bury the bodies of the dead.

=== Transport ===
17 March 2020 onwards, private airlines such as IndiGo and Go First started cancelling flights. On 19 March, the Government of India announced that no international flights will be allowed to land in India from 22 March. On 23 March, the union government announced the suspension of all domestic flights in the country starting 25 March. Vande Bharat Mission, a mass evacuation program, was started by the government of India to repatriate 250,000 stranded Indians around the world. The Ministry of tourism in India launched Stranded in India for foreign tourists stranded in India to find information and access tourism support infrastructure. On 7 August, Air India Express Flight 1344, a repatriation flight, crashed at Calicut International Airport, killing 18. Two of the survivors tested positive for COVID-19.

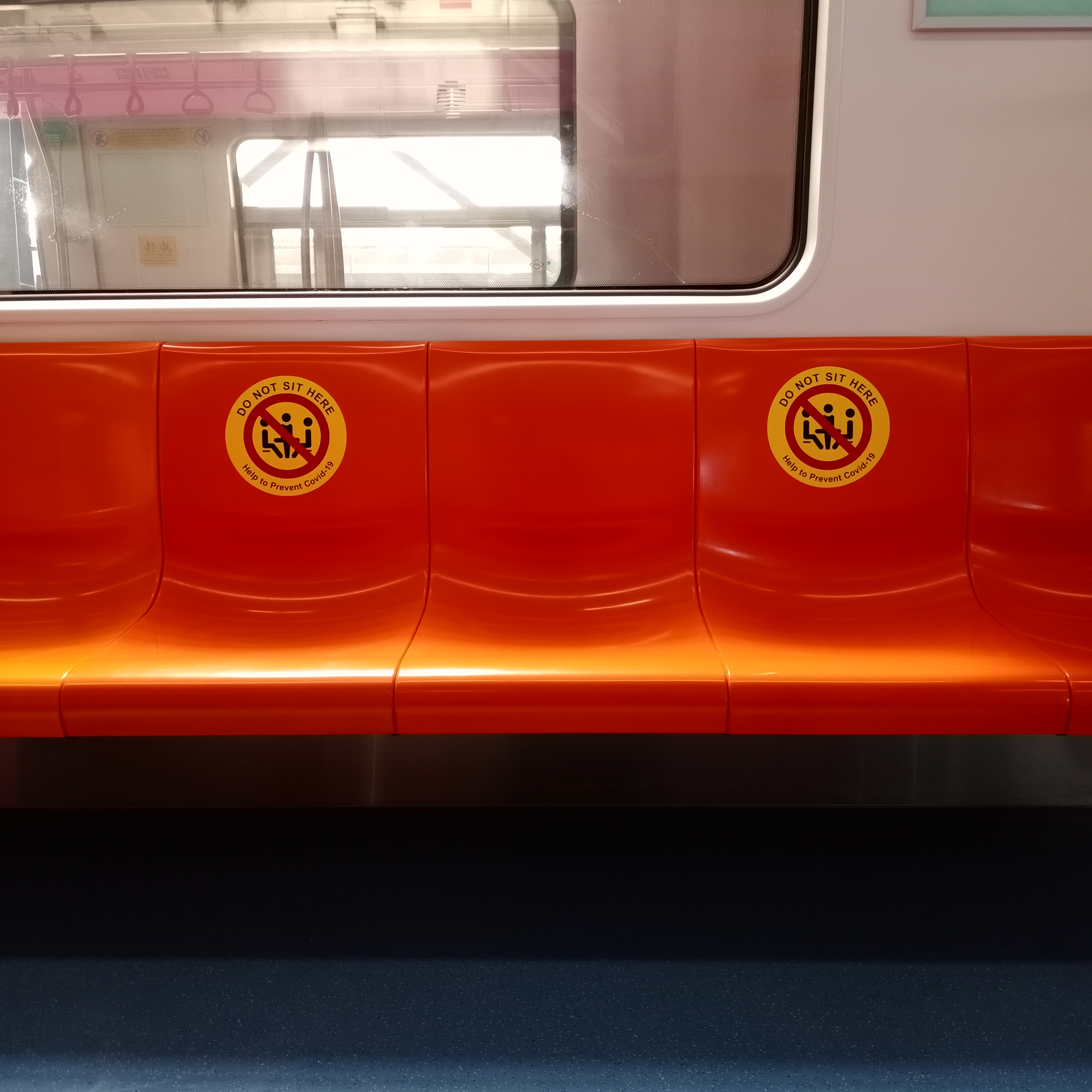
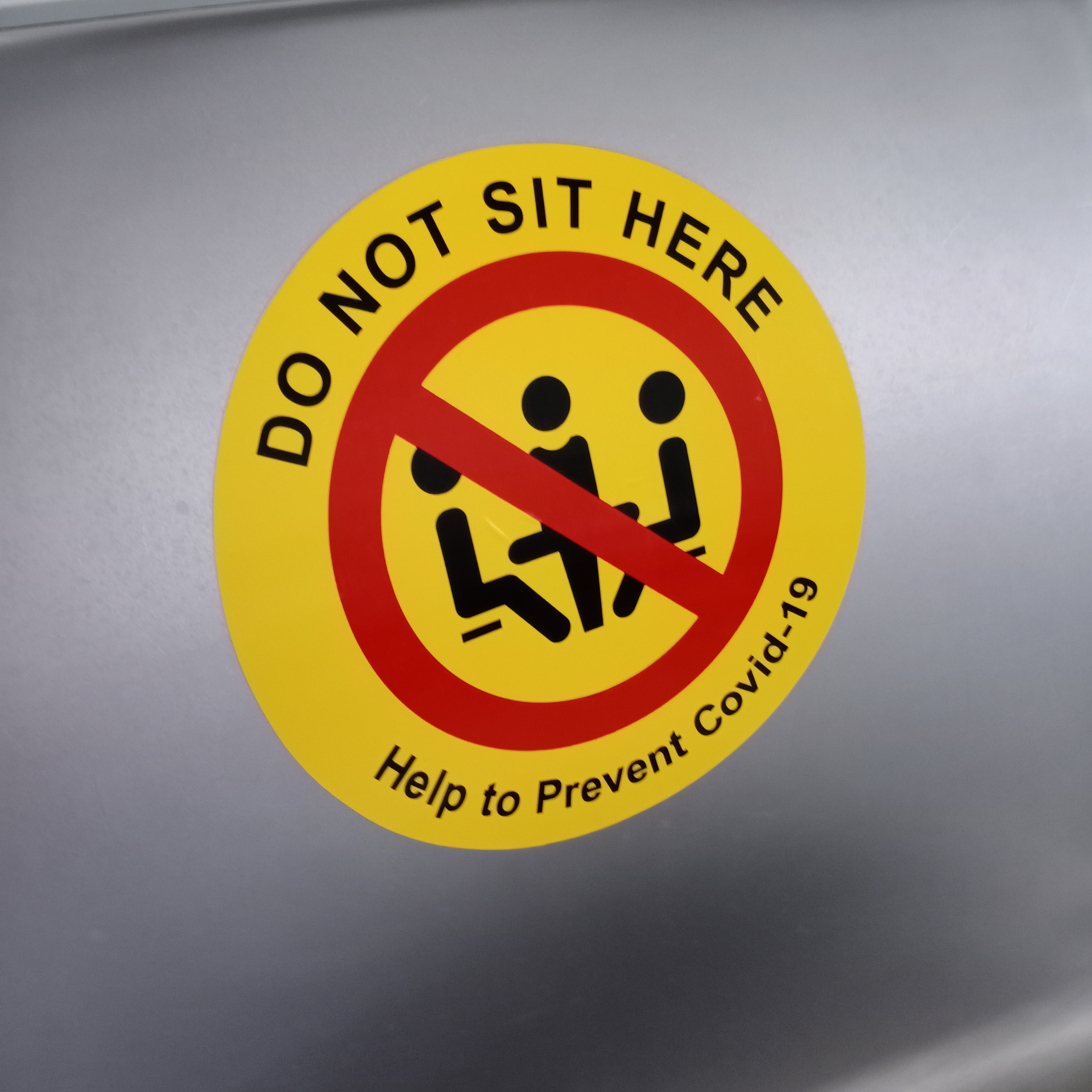
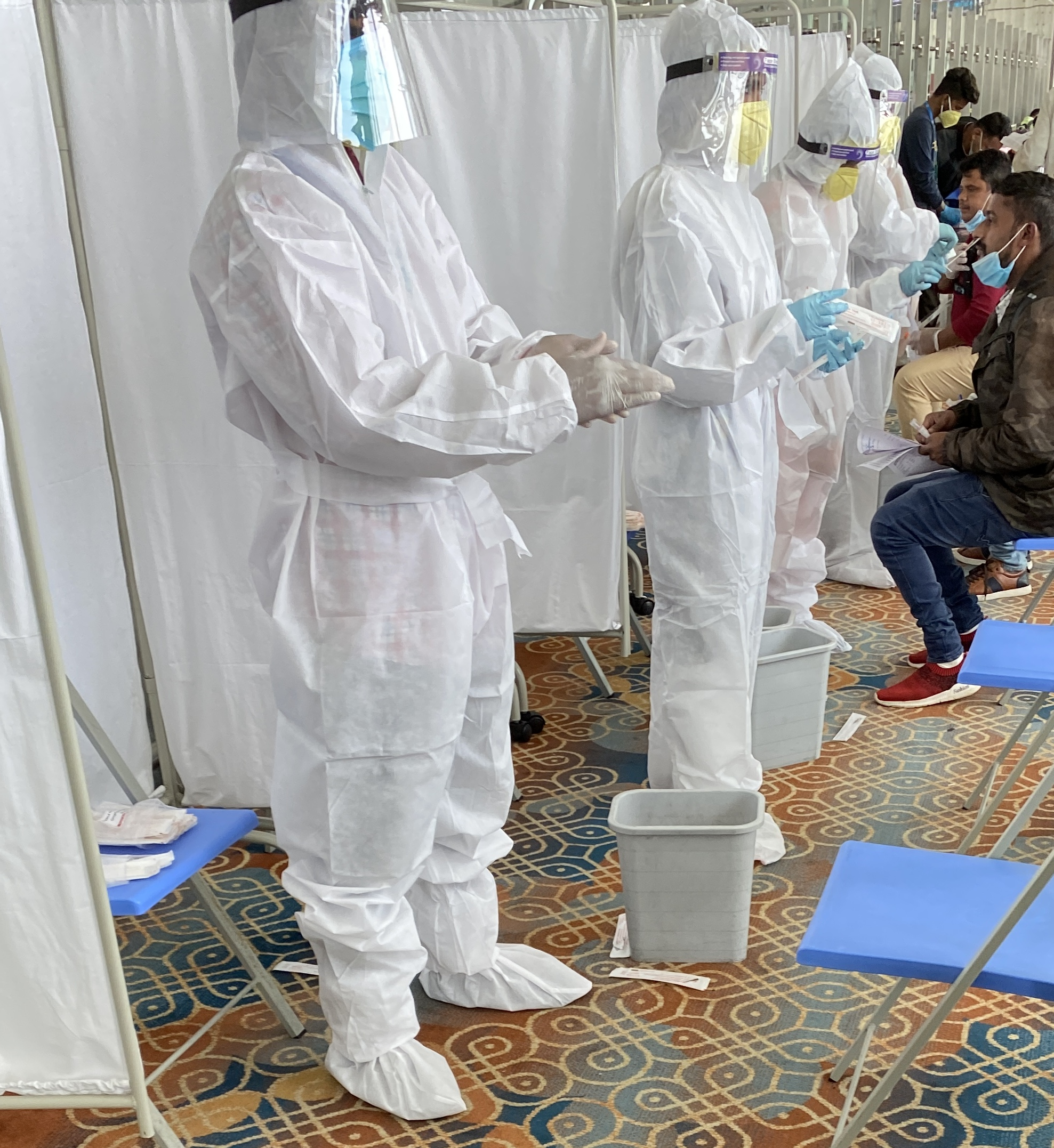
(Left, Center) Social distancing signage on the Delhi Metro.
(Right) Quarantine and testing at Bengaluru Airport in April 2021.

Indian Railways took various initiatives to fight against the pandemic. Initially this included removing curtains and blankets from AC coaches, hiking platform tickets, and cancelling 3700 trains. Metro services across India were suspended. On 22 March, all train services in the country were cancelled baring goods trains, that is around 12,500 trains, and all non-essential passenger transport including interstate transport buses. After Prime Minister Modi extended the nationwide lockdown to 3 May, Indian Railways suspended all services on its passenger trains and all ticket bookings indefinitely. On 8 May, the Aurangabad railway accident occurred due to confusion related to the pandemic. Public transport across the nation was affected.

==== Shift to private transport ====
People's mobility preferences were linked to their income levels. Higher household income correlated with increased adoption of work-from-home (WFH) measures. Higher income groups tended to own private vehicles and had more WFH opportunities. Both lower and higher-income commuters shifted to private vehicles, with the latter favoring two-wheelers.

Public transportation and shared vehicles, which provide few social distancing options for work travel, saw sharp drops during the first pandemic phase. Similarly, trip shares for using private vehicles for work-related purposes declined, perhaps as a result of work-from-home.

During the pandemic, women shifted to more work-from-home compared to men. Before COVID, women made more discretionary trips. A TERI study showed reduced metro use among women in Delhi NCR. Women were expected to increase personal car use by 9% and use taxis and autorickshaws more. In Bangalore and Kolkata, women increased their use of intermediate public transport and cars, respectively. Men continued to dominate car use.

=== Other ===
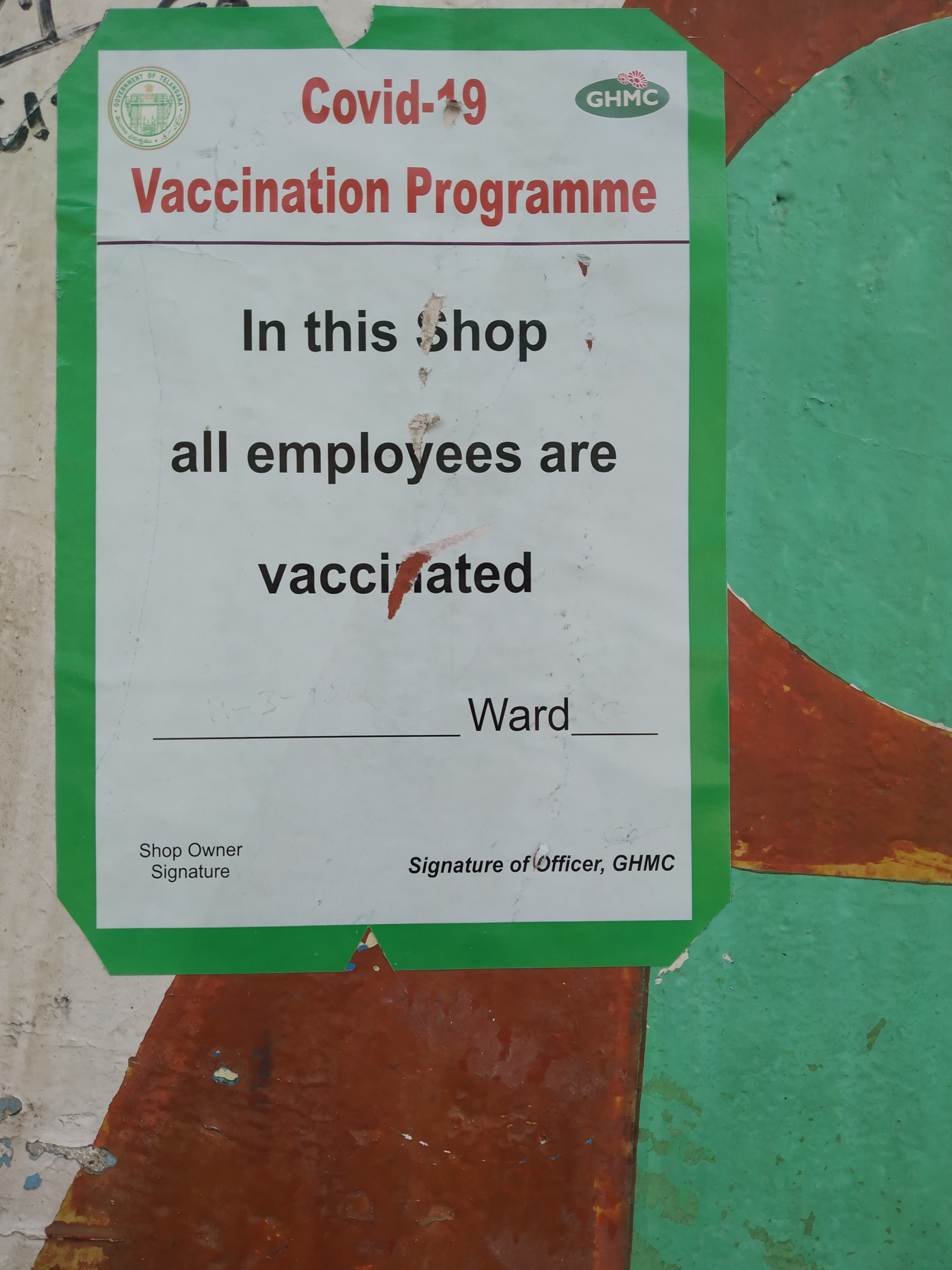
Many shopkeepers have posted "Shop vaccination certificates" in their shops to create psychological ease in their visiting customers

In March 2020, there were several incidents of panic buying in India related to the pandemic. Retailers and consumer goods firms saw their average daily sales more than double on 19 March as consumers rushed to buy essentials ahead of Modi's address to the nation. Modi assured the citizens that there was enough food and ration supplies and advised them against panic buying. The lockdown disrupted food supplies and threatened to trigger a food crisis. By the first week of April, essential industries such as growing, harvesting and food deliveries were allowed to operate.

A number of sporting events and fixtures in India were suspended, postponed or conducted behind closed doors such as the Indian Open badminton tournament, I-League, 2020 Indian Super League final, TCS World 10 Bengaluru, the IAAF Gold Label Road Race, and a FIFA World Cup qualification match (India versus Qatar). The 2020 ISSF World Cup, which was to commence on 15 March in New Delhi, was postponed. On 13 March, the Board of Control for Cricket in India (BCCI) announced that the opening of the 2020 IPL was postponed from 29 March to 15 April; the tournament was eventually suspended indefinitely. The IPL was eventually play in United Arab Emirates in September and November 2020. BCCI also cancelled the ODI matches between India and South Africa on 15 and 18 March, which were originally announced to be played without spectators.

From 7 March 2020, the Border Security Force decided to conduct the Wagah-Attari border ceremony without any spectators. The Padma Awards ceremony, scheduled for 3 April 2020, was postponed. On 17 March 2020, it was announced that all historical buildings in the country would remain closed to visitors; the monuments were opened to the public on 6 July 2020.

The International Indian Film Academy Awards, scheduled to take place on 27 March 2020, was cancelled. Cinema halls were shut down; film bodies decided to stop the production of films, TV shows and web series until 31 March 2020. On 25 March 2020, all major video streaming services in the country jointly announced that they would restrict streaming of high definition video on cellular networks during the 21-day lockdown, to preserve network capacity and infrastructure.

== Statistics ==
Cases have been reported in all states and union territories. Reconciliation of data has been undertaken by a number of states and union territories, significantly Maharashtra and Bihar, with respect to deaths. Between 1 and 5 June 2021, 7.6 million tests were reconciled.

=== Undercounting of cases and deaths ===
Undercounting of total cases and death figures was reported during the first wave in 2020. The discrepancies were detected by comparing official death counts released by the governments to the number of deaths reported in obituaries, at crematoria and burial grounds, etc. Some states were reported to have not added suspected cases to the final count contrary to WHO guidelines. Similar undercounting was reported during the second wave in 2021. There have been large gaps noted between official death figures and the sudden increase in the number of bodies being cremated and buried. Several crematoria that had been in disuse earlier were brought back into operation to keep up with the demand. Although the 2021 wave had the largest number of deaths, a study of the pandemic's first wave in 2020 showed excess deaths as high as 1.19 million people, with life expectancy dropping most precipitously among Muslims, scheduled castes, and women.

A series of articles in The Hindu newspaper in 2021 estimated that compared to previous years, the number of additional deaths during the pandemic (known as the 'excess mortality') was about four times the official COVID death toll in Chennai, Kolkata and Mumbai, and could be up to ten times higher in the state of Gujarat. However, it is not clear what proportion of these are due to COVID and what are due to other factors such as overcrowding of medical facilities, lock-down, etc. A report by the Center for Global Development stated that the second wave of COVID-19 in India was the "worst tragedy since the partition". The report, based on serosurveys, household data and official data, pointed towards a significant underreporting of deaths, with estimates ranging from about 1 million to 6 million deaths overall, with central estimates varying between 3.4 and 4.9 million deaths.

On the evening of 11 April, two reporters from the Gujarati language newspaper Sandesh and a photojournalist staked out the mortuary of the 1,200-bed state-run COVID-19 hospital in Ahmedabad. Over 17 hours, they counted 69 body bags coming out of a single exit before they were loaded into waiting ambulances. Next day, Gujarat officially counted 55 deaths, including 20 from Ahmedabad. Again on the night of 16 April, these journalists visited 21 cremation grounds around Ahmedabad and counted more than 200 bodies, with photographic and video evidence. The next day Ahmedabad counted only 25 deaths. Similar disparities in numbers were seen on other days. The Gujarat government denied the under-counting and stated that they were following federal protocols.

A study conducted by the University of California, Berkeley, and units of Harvard University, estimated in August 2021 that more than 16,000 excess deaths had occurred in 54 municipalities in Gujarat between March 2020 and April 2021. The study used data from civil death registers in a subset of Gujarat's 162 municipalities. The authors stated that the "vast majority" of these deaths could likely be attributed directly to COVID-19. The government's estimate of the death toll from COVID-19 for the entire state was approximately 10,000 for the same period.

As of February 2022, according to the country's federal health ministry's daily statement, the number of deaths had risen to 500,055, up 1,072 in the previous 24 hours, while the total number of infections was 41.9 million.

In April 2022, The New York Times reported that India was preventing the WHO from publishing its estimate of the global death toll from the coronavirus pandemic. In May 2022, the World Health Organization reported the number of Covid deaths in India to be an estimated 4.7 million mainly during a surge in May - June 2021, a figure that is almost 10 times the official number and nearly a third of the estimated global Covid deaths. The figure is similar to other estimates of Indian Covid deaths, but Indian authorities have rejected these estimates and questioned the methodology used. This WHO report reflect people who died of COVID-19 and also those who died as an indirect result of the virus. The report "accounts for deaths averted during the pandemic, for example because of the lower risk of traffic accidents during lockdowns." WHO said it was yet to fully examine new data provided by India and it may add a disclaimer due to ongoing conversation with India. Some others estimated up to 6 million deaths due to COVID in India.

== See also ==
- COVID-19 pandemic death rates by country
- COVID-19 pandemic in South Asia
- SAARC COVID-19 Emergency Fund
- Vaccine Maitri
- A list of COVID-19 articles by state Template:COVID-19 pandemic in India
- Evacuations related to the COVID-19 pandemic
