= INSACOG =

Indian Consortium to study and monitor COVID-19 genome sequencing

Indian SARS-CoV-2 Consortium on Genomics

Consortium overview
- Formed: December 30, 2020; 5 years ago
- Type: Consortium under Government of India
- Status: Active
- Parent department: Department of Biotechnology
- Website: dbtindia.gov.in/insacog

INSACOG (Indian SARS-CoV-2 Consortium on Genomics or Indian SARS-CoV-2 Genetics Consortium) is the forum set up under the Ministry of Health and Family Welfare by the Government of India on 30 December 2020, to study and monitor genome sequencing and virus variation of circulating strains of COVID-19 in India. Initially it was tasked to study the virus variant Lineage B.1.1.7 earlier found in United Kingdom in December 2020.

INSACOG works as a consortium of 38 national laboratories for genome sequencing located in different parts of India. All these 10 laboratories are required to share 5% of positive samples to INSACOG for further research and studies. A National Centre for Disease Control (NCDC) nodal unit maintain a database of all samples of the new variants. Two national genomic sequencing database centers are appointed 1) National Institute of Biomedical Genomics and 2) CSIR Institute of Genomics and Integrative Biology. In its early research INSACOG identified virus variant Lineage B.1.617 referred to as a double mutation variant. NIBMG developed a dedicated portal for INSACOG, known as the INSACOG DataHub, enabling sentinel sites to analyze generated data in a harmonized manner.

== See also ==
- GISAID
