= Timeline of the COVID-19 pandemic in the Philippines (2021) =

This article attempts to document the timeline of the COVID-19 pandemic in the Philippines in 2021.

== Timeline ==
=== January ===
- January 3 – The country banned the entry of travelers from the US until January 15, 2021, as the new virus variant was detected in Florida. This also include those who have been to the US within 14 days prior to their arrival in the country as revealed by spokesperson Harry Roque.
- January 4
  - NBI's spokesperson Ferdinand Lavin said that the bureau will investigate PSG's illegal COVID-19 vaccination.
  - Manila will provide mandatory free confirmatory COVID-19 tests to all its returning residents but violators will face criminal charges as declared by mayor Isko Moreno
  - Makati will provide free COVID-19 vaccine to its constituents as the city government allocated P1 billion, (the largest amount of vaccine fund for a city in the country) according to city mayor Abby Binay. However, the city is yet to disclose the source of the vaccine. Later on January 12, 2021, it was revealed that the vaccine will be AstraZeneca's AZD1222.
- January 6
  - A traveler from the Philippines has been tested positive for the new virus strain of COVID-19 in HK. The patient arrived in HK via Philippine Airlines flight PR300 on December 22. Meanwhile, DOH firmly stated the presence of B.1.1.7 strain in the country has not yet been detected.
  - The country added travel ban to foreigners from 6 more countries namely – Brazil, Finland, India, Jordan, Norway, and Portugal from January 8–15, 2020 amid the new virus variant as announced by Malacañang based on the joint recommendation of DOH and DFA. Foreigners who obtained negative RT-PCR test results before January 8 will still required to undergo facility-based 14-day quarantine.
- January 8 – The country issued travel ban to foreigners from Austria and South Africa over new coronavirus strain from January 10–15, 2020 as announced by the Palace.
- January 9
  - DOH announced 1,952 fresh new cases of the disease, the highest number of daily cases in a span of more than 3 weeks. This data added to the total number of cases to 485,797 in which 26,784 are still active. Meanwhile, 291 recoveries were recorded, making 449,615 for the total number of recoveries; and 34 deaths with 9,398 as total.
  - A number of local government units allocated acquisition funds for yet undisclosed COVID-19 vaccine sources which include Antipolo, BARMM, Biliran, Borongan, Cainta, Cavite, Cebu City, Davao City, Iloilo, Leyte, Legazpi City, Malabon, Marikina, Navotas, Northern Samar, Noveleta, Ormoc, Parañaque, Pasay, Puerto Princesa, Quezon, Samar, San Jose Del Monte, Santa Rosa, Tacloban, Tagbilaran, and Zamboanga City.
- January 11
  - DOH identified a total of 4,512 fixed COVID-19 vaccination posts in the whole country with a presumed rate of 100 jab tasks per team.
  - Despite reported low efficacy rate, the country was able to secure 25 million sinovac vaccines which is set to arrived in February 2021 as announced by Palace spokesperson Harry Roque
  - A number of cities in the country already secured deals with the procurement of AstraZeneca's AZD1222 vaccine which includes Bacolod, Caloocan, Iloilo City, Las Piñas, Makati, Mandaluyong, Manila, Muntinlupa, Pasig, Quezon City, San Juan, Tagbilaran, Taguig, Valenzuela, and Vigan.
  - At least 61 out of 146 cities in the country already set to acquire COVID-19 vaccines for their residents according to League of Cities of the Philippines President and Bacolod Mayor Evelio Leonardia.
- January 12 – The country extended travel ban to China, Jamaica, Luxembourg, Oman, and Pakistan from January 13–15, 2021 amid the threat of new virus strain. Meanwhile, Filipinos coming from these countries are required to undergo mandatory 14-day quarantine.
- January 13 – Philippine Genome Center (PGC) together with DOH officially confirmed that the more contagious B.1.17 virus variant already reached the country when a swab test from a 29-year-old businessman from Kamuning, Quezon City who arrived on January 7, 2021, from UAE yielded a positive result to the variant. The patient experienced pneumonia while his female partner had negative result. Consequently, DOH and Quezon City Epidemiology and Surveillance Unit (CESU) immediately conducted contract tracing over the incident.
- January 14 – Food and Drug Administration (FDA) approved Emergency Use Authorization (EUA) for Pfizer–BioNTech COVID-19 vaccine roll-out. This is the first EUA granted in the country
- January 15
  - The country extended travel ban to 35 countries and territories which includes Australia, Austria, Brazil, Canada, China, Denmark, Finland, France, Germany, HK, Iceland, India, Ireland, Israel, Italy, Jamaica, Japan, Jordan, Lebanon, Luxembourg, Netherlands, Norway, Oman, Pakistan, Portugal, Singapore, South Africa, South Korea, Spain, Sweden, Switzerland, UK, and US from January 15–31, 2021; while UAE and Hungary from January 17–31, 2021 amid the new virus strain. Consequently, Cebu Pacific temporarily won't accept foreign passengers who came from, or travelled from these countries within 14 days prior to arrival in the Philippines from January 15–31, 2021.
  - DOH undersecretary Dr. Maria Rosario Vergeire warned uncooperative passengers of Emirates Flight No. EK 332 that arrived at NAIA on January 7, 2021, that they may face future sanctions based on the Republic Act 11332 of 2019 if they failed to response to contract tracing efforts of the government. Still 13 out 159 passengers of the said flight are yet to respond to the said contact tracing in response to the first reported B.1.1.7 infected patient in the country.
- January 16 – Despite still indecisive use of sinovac in the country, China pledged to donate half a million doses of the said vaccine to the country as announced by their Foreign Minister Wang Yi during its recent state visit. However, donated vaccines can only be accepted by DOH upon acquiring EUA from FDA.
- January 17 – In less than a year after its first reported case, the country breached 500,000 mark on the number of COVID-19 cases as DOH reported 1,895 fresh cases, reaching 500,577 count which includes 24,691 still active cases; 5,868 recoveries adding to 465,991 recovered patients; and 11 deaths bringing to 9,895 toll. The country ranked at 32nd place with the most cases in the world and 2nd in Southeast Asia only behind to world's 19th ranked Indonesia (907,929 cases).
- January 18
  - Bontoc mayor Franklin Odsey tested positive for COVID-19, opting the capital town to imposed lockdown to its pre-identified barangays from January 18–31.
  - Philippine Superliga partnered with Go Negosyo program will procure vaccines for all its players as revealed by its league chairman Philip Ella Juico, becoming the first major sports organization in the country to acquire its own vaccines.
- January 21
  - Senator Pia Cayetano filed Senate Bill No. 1999 which aim to create vaccine passport initiative that will to set up a database registry of individuals who had been inoculated including their vaccination details as well as to monitor vaccine distribution and its effects. Holders of these passports may also be given certain privileges, access or exemptions to international and domestic travel, health checkpoints, quarantine, and business establishments.
  - Despite World Health Organization's non-recommendation of COVID-19 vaccination for pregnant women, DOH will still seek obstetrics' and gynecologist's opinion on the possible inoculation of the said group.
  - Bharat Biotech of India applied for EUA in the country for their developed COVAXIN as announced by FDA.
- January 22 – Sixteen (16) more cases of UK-COVID-19 variant were reported in the country as announced by the DOH with 12 of these cases are from Bontoc, Mt. Province.
- January 23
  - Bontoc mayor Franklin Odsey revealed the reported UK variant cases originated from a Filipina who arrived on December 11, 2020, from UK. The said individual attended a tribal ritual and infected 11 others. Initially, she was tested negative upon arrival but later developed symptoms and yielded positive result after a re-test on December 18, 2020. Two villages within the town, including barangays Samoki, the epicenter of the new UK-COVID-19 variant were placed under lockdown with Bontoc alone had 203% increased over two weeks span.
  - Experts from DOH's technical advisory group disclosed that the more contagious UK variant had entered the country on December 10, 2020 (that time the variant was still unknown) through a Bontoc female patient who arrived from UK, much earlier than the reported case on January 13, 2021, from a Quezon City male resident who arrived from UAE.
- January 24
  - Barangay Guadalupe in Cebu City placed under lockdown every Sunday that started on January 24, 2021, over the sudden spike on the number of cases within the village based on their new barangay resolution. Residents were barred to leave their homes unless for emergency or important business, or they are frontliners or APOR.
  - Bontoc mayor Franklin Odysey issued an Executive Order extending lockdown in barangay Tocucan, Bontoc Ili, Caluttit, Poblacion, and Samoki effective January 25–31, 2021 amid threat of the new coronavirus variant. The town has 341 total COVID-19 cases, with 90 recoveries and 249 active cases.
- January 25
  - Commission on Higher Education approved limited face-to-face classes for students of medicine and allied health sciences in areas under MGCQ. Meanwhile, students in GCQ areas are allowed go into COVID-19 hospitals. UP Manila, Ateneo de Manila University, and Our Lady of Fatima University-Valenzuela were among the universities who were allowed by the commission but other schools who wish to hold limited face-to-face classes must submit an application as confirmed by commissioner Prospero De Vera III.
  - Philippine Red Cross kicked-off COVID-19 saliva testing initially at its headquarter in Mandaluyong and at its molecular laboratory, Port Area Manila. The said test was priced at P2,000 per test, P1,800 less expensive than the regular swab testing.
- January 26 – Pasig became the first LGU in the country with COVID-19 vaccination plan approved by the DOH-WHO as announced by mayor Vico Sotto.
- January 27 – Starting February 1, 2021, travelers arriving in the country regardless of origin are required to have their COVID-19 tests on the 5th day of quarantine instead of arrival date unless any earlier symptoms will occur as announced by Malacañang upon the recommendation of IATF-EID and DOH. Once tested negative on the 5th day, passengers will be endorsed to LGU of destination to continue the mandatory 14-day quarantine.
- January 28 – FDA granted EUA of AstraZeneca COVID-19 vaccine, becoming the 2nd vaccine after Pfizer–BioNTech COVID-19 vaccine with approved EUA in the country.
- January 29 – Palace through its spokesperson announced regions – NCR and CAR will be placed under GCQ including Batangas, Tacloban City, Davao City, Davao del Norte, Lanao del Sur, and Iligan City from February 1–28, 2021. Meanwhile, the rest of the country under MGCQ.
- January 30 – After a year of its first reported case, the country logged 2,109 COVID-19 infected individuals pushing the tally to 523,516. Meanwhile, 146 recoveries and 17 deaths were also recorded bring the total recovered patients to 475,904 and death toll to 10,669. Thus, 36,943 cases are still active with country's recovery rate at 90.9%.

=== February ===
- February 1
  - Asian Development Bank allocated $25 M to the country to loan out for procurement of COVID-19 vaccines to 70 million Filipinos, as a target by the DOH.
  - Baguio City implemented daily curfew hours from 10 pm to 4 am; and liquor ban from 8 pm to 10 am in the entire city as GCQ commences in CAR.
  - Ilocus Sur temporarily closed its borders with Mt. Province as to prevent the possible entry of B.1.1.7 strain from Bontoc through an issued executive order by governor Ryan Singson. Two of its borders are located at barangay Aluling and Commilas in the town of Cervantes.
- February 5
  - Foreigners with valid visa are allowed to entry the country starting February 16, 2021, requiring that they should have a pre-booked accommodation for at least 6 nights in accredited quarantine hotels or venues and also subject to swab test on the 6th day from their arrival date, as announced by Palace spokesperson Harry Roque. Among those allowed are foreigners who are parents of minor Filipinos, parents of Filipino children with special needs; accredited officials and international organization officials, airline crews, those with investor visas, medical practitioners including their medical escorts.
  - The country logged 8 more cases from B.1.1.7 COVID-19 – 3 additional from Bontoc, 2 from La Trinidad, Benguet, 2 OFWs, and 1 from Liloan, Cebu as announced by DOH.
  - Malacañang released the list of priority groups for COVID-19 vaccination as follows:

List of priority groups for COVID-19 vaccination
ID	Group	Population Description
A1	Frontliners	all health professionals and non-professionals such students, nursing aides, janitors, and BHC
A2	Senior Citizens	population aged 60 years old and above.
A3	PWC	Person with Comorbidities or person with pre-existing medical condition(s).
A4	Uniformed	frontline personnel in essential sectors and those identified by IATF-EID during ECQ.
A5	Indigents	indigenous population
B1	Education-Social	all teachers and social workers
B2	Government	all other government employees
B3	Essential	all other essential workers
B4	High Risk	other socio-demographic population at higher risks
B5	OFWs	those in the country during the time of vaccination
B6	Workforce	all employees or workforce not included in the preceding groups
C	Others	rest of Filipino population not included in the above groups

- February 8 – The country recorded the first death caused by UK-variant B.1.1.7 COVID-19 through an 84-year-old man from La Trinidad, Benguet got sicked between 3rd–4th week of January 2021. DOH is still investigating the case since the patient has no reported contact to any positive carrier. With this, 22 out of 25 B.1.1.7 patients were already recovered; 2 are still active; and 1 fatality.
- February 11
  - The country is expected to receive an initial batch of 600,000 COVID-19 vaccine shots from Sinovac on February 23, 2021, as announced by Palace spokesman Harry Roque.
  - Bohol eased health protocol for arriving tourists in the province. According to Governor Arthur C. Yap, tourists are no longer required to undergo any quarantine procedures as long a negative swab result is presented
- February 12 – The IATF-EID allows the reopening of select leisure facilities such as cinemas, theme parks, museums, libraries, and arcades in areas under General Community Quarantine, an amendment from the previous ruling wherein these facilities are only open in areas under Modified General Community Quarantine. The seating capacity for religious gatherings in GCQ areas has been expanded to 50 percent.
- February 13 – Four barangays in Ubay, Bohol namely, Bood, Fatima, Poblacion, and Tapon were placed under MECQ effective immediately until further notice due to sudden spike on the numbers of COVID-19 cases in the municipality as announced by the Municipal Inter-Agency Task Force (MIATF). Up to this date, Ubay has recorded a total of 76 confirmed cases, with 29 still active cases, 45 recoveries, and 2 fatalities.
- February 14 – Metro Manila mayors opposed the IATF-EID resolution allowing movie theaters to reopen, thus moving the target reopening date to March 1, 2021. Manila Mayor Isko Moreno Domagoso gives free swab tests to employees in the cinema industry in a bid to ensure a safe reopening.
- February 15 – The country breached the 550,000-mark on the number of COVID-19 cases with the actual total of 550,860 as DOH reported 1,685 new cases, with 27,588 still active cases. Two fatalities were also recorded, the lowest since July 21, 2020; and 14 recovered patients, bringing the total recoveries to 511,755 at 92.90% recovery rate.
- February 17 – The country has signed an indemnity agreement as requirement to acquire Pfizer's and AstraZeneca's COVID-19 vaccines from COVAX as revealed by IATF-EID vaccine czar Carlito Galvez Jr. With this deal, the government guarantees to shoulder the cost for any adverse effects of all vaccine receivers as confirmed by NTF deputy chief implementer Vince Dizon.
- February 18 – Two OFW balikbayans from UAE and Canada tested positive with the disease despite receiving COVID-19 vaccine jabs. The first patient was a 43-year-old male UAE based-OFW from Mandaue City tested positive on February 8, 2021, who received the Sinopharm BIBP vaccine set on December 12, 2020, and January 2, 2021. The second case was a 25-year-old female from Canada who tested positive on February 14, 2021. However, this female patient was only able to have her first dose of Tozinameran Pfizer–BioNTech vaccine on January 13, 2021. DOH reiterated that vaccine doesn't absolutely provide immunity to individual but rather preventing the disease to become severe.
- February 20 – Pasay LGU placed 33 barangays and 1 business establishment under a 14-day lockdown due to sudden spike of COVID-19 cases as announced by their city administrator Dennis Acorda.
- February 22
  - President Duterte refused NEDA's proposal of placing the entire country on MGCQ before COVID-19 vaccination roll-out.
  - FDA granted EUA to Sinovac's CoronaVac, became the third vaccine with approved EUA in the country.
  - Cebu became the 1st province in the country to scrap RT-PCR requirement for incoming local tourists through Executive Order No. 12 of 2021 signed by Governor Gwendolyn Garcia as to ease travel restrictions and gradually reviving the tourism industry. Tourists are only required to present valid medical certificates 7 days prior to their arrival and resort or hotel pre-booking details.
- February 27 – Despite clamors of imposing MGCQ for the entire country, Malacañang approved new quarantine status placing NCR, Apayao, Baguio City, Kalinga, Mt. Province, Batangas, Tacloban City, Iligan City, Davao City, and Lanao del Sur on GCQ for March 2021. While the rest of the country under MGCQ.
- February 28 – At around 4 pm at Villamor Air Base, the country officially received its first batch of COVID-19 vaccines, became the last ASEAN country to do so. These CoronaVac vaccines were from Sinovac Biotech donated by China consisting of 600,000 shots.

=== March ===
- March 1 – PGH Director Dr. Gerardo Legaspi became the first official recipient of COVID-19 vaccine as vaccination rollout began in the country.
- March 2 – Six cases of B.1.351 South African variant was detected in the country by UP-PGC as announced by DOH. With first detection in the country, 3 of these cases are local, 2 are ROFs, and one still unknown.
- March 4 – President Rodrigo Duterte personally welcomed the arrival KLM Flight 803 carrying 487,200 doses of the AstraZeneca COVID-19 vaccine at Ninoy Aquino International Airport. These vaccine came from COVAX facility in Belgium.
- March 7, 2021 – The country has received additional 38,400 doses of AstraZeneca COVID-19 vaccines which arrived at 6:43 p.m at NAIA 3 as confirmed by the National Task Force against COVID-19. This set of vaccines came from COVAX Facility from Amsterdam loaded on a Boeing 777 commercial flight of Royal Dutch Airline flight KLM803 via Bangkok. As of the date, the country already gained more than 1.1 million doses of vaccines.
- March 9 – The country has breached 600,000 mark on the total of number of COVID-19 cases which peaked at 600,428 as announced by DOH. This consists of 41,822 still active cases with 2,668 as newly recorded cases; 171 new recoveries with total at 546,078; 7 mortalities, bringing the death toll to 12,528.
- March 12 – OCTA Research group named 12 cities in NCR and 3 cities in Cebu were among the top 15 areas with a significant increasing trend in the number of new COVID-19 cases. This includes Quezon City, Manila, Pasay, Makati, Parañaque, Taguig, Caloocan, Pasig, Malabon, Valenzuela, Marikina, Navotas, Cebu City, Mandaue, and Lapu-Lapu.
- March 15 – Metro Manila Council enforced uniform curfew from 10 P.M. to 5 A.AM in NCR that will run for 2 weeks from March 15–31, 2021. Only essential workers were exempted from the said curfew
- March 18 – A new SARS-CoV-2 variant had emerged in the country named as P.3, a third generation COVID-19 variant with similarity with Japanese B.1.1.248 and Brazilian variant P.1. The said variant was first discovered in Central Visayas after analyzing 33 samples from late January to early February 2021 conducted by UP.
- March 19
  - DOH logged 7,103 new COVID-19 cases, the highest recorded number of new cases in a single day in the country since the start of pandemic. This number also passed the previous highest record which is 6,958 on August 10, 2020. The total number was brought to 648,066 with 72,264 active cases which is also the highest this year. DOH also announced 390 recoveries and 13 deaths, bringing the total recovered patients to 561,902 and death toll to 12,900.
  - Country's FDA granted EUA to Russian's Sputnik V Gam-COVID-Vac COVID-19 vaccine. Late trials of the vaccine showed 91 percent efficacy rate as revealed by FDA
- March 20 – The country logged a new daily record high for the number of new COVID-19 cases at 7,999 surpassing just yesterday's record of 7,103. This number brought the total number of cases to 656,056 with 80,642 as active cases. DOH also recorded new 597 recoveries and 30 deaths which added to the total of 562,484 recovered patients and 12,930 fatalities.
- March 21 – Amid the sudden surge of COVID-19 cases in the country, President Rodrigo Duterte had placed NCR+ (includes NCR, Bulacan, Cavite, Laguna, and Rizal) under GCQ starting March 22 until April 4, 2021, with additional measures based on IATF-EID Resolution No. 104.
- March 22 – The country logged a new daily high record of 8,019 new COVID-19 cases, surpassing the tally last 2 days ago, bringing the total number of cases to 671,792. This number includes 80,970 or 12.1% active patients; 103 new recoveries with total at 577,850; and 4 fatalities with total death toll at 12,972.
- March 24 – Additional 400,000 doses of COVID-19 Sinovac vaccine donated by China arrived at NAIA at exactly 7:21 a.m. via Philippine Airlines flight and welcomed by Senator Bong Go, chairman of the Senate Committee on Health, Sec. Francisco Duque III, vaccine czar Carlito Galvez Jr., and Chinese Ambassador Huang Xilian. It was the second batch of Sinovac vaccines donated by China which now at 1M doses in total.
- March 25 – A new daily high record of 8,773 new COVID-19 cases was reported by DOH, bringing the total to 693,048 with active cases at 99,891, also the highest daily record since the start of the pandemic. Another 574 recoveries and 56 fatalities were logged stretching the total to 580,0062 for recovered patients and 13,095 death toll.
- March 26 – COVID-19 cases in the Philippines breached the 700,000-mark on Friday with another record-high 9,838 newly reported infections, as the capital region's coronavirus wards continued to see a stream of fresh admissions.
- March 27 – A new record high of 118,122 active cases out of 712,442 total COVID-19 cases with the addition of 9,595 new infections was logged by the DOH. This data includes 481 recuperated patients at 581,161 total recoveries, and 10 fatalities at 13,159 death toll.
- March 29
  - President Rodrigo Duterte personally welcomed the arrival of Philippine Airlines flight PR361 from Beijing at Villamor Airbase carrying 1M doses of Sinovac COVID-19 vaccines. The set is the first batch of 26M doses of vaccines procured by the government from Sinovac.
  - The country recorded a new daily high of 10,016 new COVID-19 cases which brought the total cases to 731,894. This number includes 115,495 active cases, 78 new recoveries (recuperated patients at 603,213), and 16 fatalities (death toll at 13,186).
  - During his weekly state address, President Rodrigo Duterte had placed NCR+ bubble under ECQ until April 4, 2021; Quirino under ECQ from April 1–15, 2021; Santiago City with MECQ from April 1–30, 2021; Cordillera Region, Cagayan, Isabela, Nueva Vizcaya, Batangas, Lanao del Sur, Davao City, Iligan City, and Tacloban City under GCQ from April 1–30, 2021; and MGCQ for the rest of the country.
  - Former president Joseph Ejercito-Estrada tested positive to COVID-19 and had been rushed to hospital due to weakening body as revealed by his son and former senator Jinggoy Estrada.

=== April ===
- April 2 – The country recorded a new all-time daily high of 15,310 new COVID-19 cases as the total confirmed cases skyrocketed to 771,497. Active cases surged to 153,809 which is also the highest recorded number of infected patients in a single day. Meanwhile, DOH also reported 434 new recuperated patients and 17 fatalities bringing the total recoveries to 604,368 and death toll to 13,320.
- April 3
  - ECQ was extended in NCR+ bubble for a week from April 5–11, 2021 as announced by Malacañang through spokesperson Harry Roque Jr.
  - Philippine Orthopedic Center reported 117 out of its 180 tested personnel came positive with COVID-19 according to Dr. John Andrew Michael Bengzon, officer-in-charge.
- April 5 – The country had breached the 800,000 mark as the total number of COVID-19 cases surged to 803,398 with 8,355 fresh cases reported. Active cases reached 143,726 or 17.9%; recoveries increased by 145 to 646,237; and death toll climbed by 10 to 13,435. Meanwhile, DFA also reported 17 new cases for Filipinos abroad with total at 16,423; recoveries at 10,060; and death toll at 1,049.
- April 7 – The country's COVID-19 death toll had breached 14,000-mark, which peaked at 14,059 as DOH confirmed 242 new fatalities. Additional 6,414 fresh cases and 163 recuperated patients were also reported bringing the total cases to 819,164 and total recoveries at 646,404.
- April 8
  - FDA granted an hospital's request for compassionate special permit to use Ivermectin against COVID-19 as revealed by Rolando Domingo, Director General.
  - With reported unusual blood cloths with persons having low platelet count after inoculation, DOH temporarily stopped the use of AstraZeneca vaccine in the country upon FDA's recommendation, for people below 60 years old.
- April 9 – The country logged an all-time daily record on the highest number of deaths on a single day at 401 fatalities, bringing the total death toll to 14,520. Active cases also reached a new all-time high at 178,351 or 21.2% of the total cases as DOH reported 12,225 new cases and 946 recuperated patients, with total cases at 840,554 and 647,683 recoveries respectively.
- April 11 – Malacañang through its spokesperson Harry Roque announced NCR+ bubble will be placed to a more relaxed MECQ status from April 12–30, 2021 after being put under ECQ.
- April 12 – COVID-19 death toll in the country had breached 15,000 mark with additional new 204 fatalities raising the total to 15,149. DOH also logged 11,378 fresh cases and 267 recuperated patients bringing the total cases to 876,225 of which 157,451 or 18% are still active cases and 703,625 as total recoveries.
- April 15 – COVID-19 cases in the country had breached 900,000 mark with additional 11,429 new infections bringing the total to 904,285 in which 20.3% or 183,527 as active cases. DOH also recorded new 856 recoveries and 148 fatalities, pushing the total to 705,164 for recuperated patients and 15,594 for death toll.
- April 18 – The number of recoveries in the country had reached an all-time high at 72,607 recorded in a single day since the start of the pandemic. Meanwhile, DOH also logged 10,098 new cases and 150 fatalities, pushing the total cases to 936,133 in which 141,089 or 15.1% are active; and death toll at 15,960.
- April 19
  - FDA approved EUA of Bharat Biotech's Covaxin and Johnson & Johnson's Janssen COVID-19 vaccine as confirmed by Director General Rolando Domingo.
  - DOH approved FDA's recommendation to lift the suspension order on the use of AstraZeneca vaccine for people under 60 years old, as revealed by undersecretary Maria Rosario Vergeire.
- April 22 – An additional 500,000 shots of Sinovac COVID-19 vaccine (procured) arrived at NAIA at 5:16 p.m. via a PAL flight which welcomed by vaccine czar Carlito Galvez Jr. and DOH Secretary Francisco Duque III.
- April 26 – The country had breached 1-M mark on the number of COVID-19 cases with additional 8,929 new infections, swelling the total cases to 1,006,428. Meanwhile, DOH also logged new 11,333 recuperated patients and 70 deaths bringing total recoveries at 90.9% or 914,952 count and death toll at 1.67% or 16,853. Current active cases is 74,623 at 7.4%.
- April 27 – All travelers, including those with recent travel history within the last 14 days from India were temporarily banned from entering the country, from April 29 to May 14, 2021, amid the threat of South Asian B.1.617 COVID-19 variant as announced by Malacañang spokesperson Harry Roque.
- April 28
  - MECQ status for NCR+ bubble is extended until May 14, 2021, as announced by President Rodrigo Duterte. Meanwhile, Abra, Santiago City, and Quirino were placed under MECQ; Apayao, Baguio City, Benguet, Ifugao, Kalinga, Mountain Province, Cagayan, Isabela, Nueva Vizcaya, Batangas, Quezon, Tacloban City, Iligan City, Davao City, and Lanao del Sur under GCQ; and rest of the country under MGCQ from May 1–31, 2021.
  - Metro Manila Council through Resolution 21-09 Series of 2021, agreed to adjust curfew hours from 10 pm to 4 am in NCR starting May 1, 2021, as announced by MMDA.
- April 29 – The sixth batch of Sinovac COVID-19 vaccine (procured) arrived at NAIA at around 7:10 a.m consisting of 500,000 doses via a Cebu Pacific chartered flight from Beijing. In total, the country received a total of 3.5M doses of CoronaVac including the earlier 1M doses which had been donated by the Chinese government. The said vaccine batch will be temporarily stored in a cold storage facility in Marikina City before disseminating to LGUs.
- April 30 – After an appeal from its LGU, Malacañang through its spokesperson, Sec. Roque announced Ifugao is now shifted to stricter MECQ on May 1–14, 2021 together with NCR+ bubble. Meanwhile, Puerto Princesa City is placed under GCQ status from May 1–31, 2021.

=== May ===
- May 1
  - The first batch of the Sputnik V COVID-19 vaccine (procured) arrived at NAIA around 3:44 p.m consisting of 15,000 doses via Qatar Airways. Secretary Carlito Galvez Jr., NTF chief implementer and vaccine czar, said the 15,000 doses will be used for a dry run in preparation for the arrival of bigger shipments this month.
  - The Philippine government started the vaccination of A4 priority group consisting of economic frontliners through a symbolic inoculation on Labor Day.
- May 3 – Health Secretary Francisco Duque III administers President Rodrigo Duterte with the Sinopharm BIBP vaccine.
- May 5 – The country temporarily imposed ban to travelers including those with 14-days prior travel history from Nepal, Sri Lanka, Bangladesh, and Pakistan from May 7 to 14, 2021 amid the threat of B.1.617 COVID-19 variant as announced by Executive Secretary Salvador Medialdea.
- May 7
  - The country breached 1-M mark on the total number of recoveries as DOH announced additional 4,227 recuperated patients, bringing the total to 1,003,160 at 92.22% rate. Meanwhile, 7,733 fresh cases and 108 fatalities were also reported, raising the total confirmed cases to 1,087,885 and death toll to 18,099.
  - The seventh batch of the Sinovac COVID-19 vaccine (procured) arrived at NAIA around 7:59 a.m consisting of 1,500,000 doses via Cebu Pacific.
- May 8 – The third batch of AstraZeneca COVID-19 vaccine arrived at NAIA around 1 p.m consisting of 2,030,400 doses via Singapore Airlines flight.
- May 10 – The first batch of Pfizer–BioNTech COVID-19 vaccine arrived at NAIA around 9 p.m consisting of 193,050 doses via Air Hong Kong.
- May 12 – The second batch of Sputnik V COVID-19 vaccine (procured) arrived at NAIA around 9 p.m consisting of 15,000 doses via Qatar Airways. Food and Drug Administration Director General Eric Domingo told GMA News Online that the 15,000 doses delivered on Wednesday were Component 2 or the Sputnik V's second dose.
- May 13 – Malacañang through its spokesperson announced the shift of NCR plus to GCQ status from May 15–31, 2021, including CAR, Cagayan, Isabela, and Nueva Vizcaya, Batangas, Quezon, Puerto Princesa City, Iligan City, Davao City, and Lanao Del Sur. Meanwhile, Santiago City, Zamboanga City, Quirino, and Ifugao were placed under MECQ and rest of the country under MGCQ from May 15–31, 2021.
- May 14 – All travelers including those with 14-days prior travel history from Oman and the United Arab Emirates were added to travel ban from May 15–31, 2021 as confirmed by Presidential spokesman Harry Roque upon the recommendation of DOH amid the threat of B.1.617 COVID-19 variant. Meanwhile, travel ban from India, Pakistan, Nepal, Bangladesh and Sri Lanka was extended until May 31, 2021.
- May 20
  - The eight batch of the Sinovac COVID-19 vaccine (procured) arrived at NAIA around 7:35 a.m consisting of 500,000 doses of government-procured via a commercial Cebu Pacific flight, bringing the country's total stockpile of the vaccine so far to 5.5 million of CoronaVac.
  - The highest daily vaccination rate was recorded in the country with 229,769 inoculations administered in a day since the start of the nationwide vaccination drive. Currently, a total of 3,718,308 doses were already administered to priority population which includes frontliners, senior citizens, and people with comorbidities.
- May 23 – IATF-EID placed Iloilo City under MECQ status including the provinces of Apayao, Benguet, Cagayan from May 23–31, 2021 amid the sudden surge of COVID-19 cases.
- May 25 – The country passed the 20,000 mark on the number of COVID-19 deaths as DOH recorded 36 additional fatalities bringing the death toll at 20,019. Meanwhile, 3,972 fresh cases and 4,659 recuperations were also reported raising the total cases to 1,188,672 and recoveries to 1,120,452 at 94.26% rate.
- May 30
  - The third batch of the Sputnik V COVID-19 vaccine (procured) from Moscow arrived at NAIA around 10:30 p.m consisting of 50,000 doses via Qatar Airways.
  - Barangay Namruangan in Cabugao, Ilocos Sur was placed under 'extreme' ECQ from May 29 to June 11, 2021, through a resolution approved by Mayor Edgardo Cobangbang Jr. due to rising number of COVID-19 cases. The village reported 31 cases which consists mainly of its barangay officials. Residents aren't allowed to leave their homes, and their essential needs are covered by the municipality. Meanwhile, the rest of the town is under MECQ until June 8, 2021.
- May 31
  - President Rodrigo Duterte approved IATF-EID's recommendation to extend GCQ in the NCR+ bubble from June 1–15, 2021. Also placed under GCQ are Baguio City, Kalinga, Mountain Province, Abra, Isabela, Nueva Vizcaya, Quirino, Batangas, Quezon, Iligan City, Davao City, Lanao del Sur, and Cotabato City from June 1–30, 2021. Meanwhile, MECQ were set to Santiago City, Cagayan, Apayao, Benguet, Ifugao, Puerto Princesa City, Iloilo City, Zamboanga City, Zamboanga Sibugay, Zamboanga del Sur, Zamboanga del Norte, Cagayan de Oro City, Butuan City, and Agusan del Sur; and MGCQ for the rest of the country from June 1–15, 2021.
  - Travel ban was extended from June 1–15, 2021 for travelers from India, Pakistan, Nepal, Bangladesh, Sri Lanka, Oman, and the United Arab Emirates as to prevent the spread of the double mutant B.1617 COVID-19 variant upon the approval of President Rodrigo Duterte.

=== June ===
- June 6 – The ninth batch of Sinovac COVID-19 vaccine (procured) arrived at NAIA around 7:36 a.m consisting of 1,000,000 doses via Cebu Pacific flight.
- June 7 – FDA Director General Eric Domingo confirmed the approval of EUA of the Sinopharm BIBP vaccine, becoming the 8th vaccine to receive regulatory approval in the country after Sinovac, Pfizer-BioNTech, Oxford-AstraZeneca, Gamaleya-Sputnik V, Johnson & Johnson, Covaxin and Moderna. Earlier on May 8, 2021, WHO approved the emergency use of the said vaccine.
- June 8 – The Food and Drug Administration (FDA) has approved the amendment to the emergency use authorization for Pfizer-BioNTech coronavirus disease 2019 (COVID-19) vaccine for individuals 12 and above, a health official confirmed Tuesday.
- June 10
  - The tenth batch of Sinovac COVID-19 vaccine (procured) arrived at NAIA around 7:28 a.m consisting of 1,000,000 doses via Cebu Pacific flight.
  - The second batch of Pfizer–BioNTech COVID-19 vaccine arrived at NAIA around 8:30 p.m consisting of 2,279,160 doses via Air Hong Kong.
- June 11 – The fourth batch of the Sputnik V COVID-19 vaccine (procured) from Moscow arrived at NAIA consisting of 100,000 doses via Qatar Airways.
- June 13 – DOH Undersecretary and treatment czar Leopoldo Vega revealed that only 2% of the country's 109.48M population are fully vaccinated who are able to receive both doses of COVID-19 vaccines after three months since the start of the vaccination rollout.
- June 17 – The eleventh batch of Sinovac COVID-19 vaccine (procured) arrived at NAIA around 7:30 a.m consisting of 1,500,000 doses via Cebu Pacific flight.
- June 24 – The twelfth batch of Sinovac COVID-19 vaccine (procured) arrived at NAIA around 7:26 a.m consisting of 2,000,000 doses via Cebu Pacific flight.
- June 27 – The first batch of Moderna COVID-19 vaccine (procured) arrived at NAIA around 11 p.m consisting of 249,600 doses via Singapore Airlines flight.
- June 28
  - The thirteenth batch of Sinovac COVID-19 vaccine (procured) arrived at NAIA around 7 a.m consisting of 1,000,000 doses via Cebu Pacific flight.
  - The Philippines has administered more than 10 million doses of COVID-19 vaccines to its population nearly four months since its inoculation program began.

=== July ===
- July 8 – The fourth batch of AstraZeneca COVID-19 vaccine (donated) arrived at NAIA around 8:26 p.m consisting of 1,124,100 doses via All Nippon Airways flight from Japan.
- July 9
  - The fifth batch of AstraZeneca COVID-19 vaccine (donated) from COVAX facility arrived at NAIA Terminal 3 around 4 p.m consisting of 2,028,100 doses via Emirates flight EK332.
  - The fourth batch of Sputnik V COVID-19 vaccine (procured) arrived at NAIA around 10:50 p.m consisting of 132,200 doses via Qatar Airways flight.
- July 10 – The fifth batch of Sputnik V COVID-19 vaccine (procured) arrived at NAIA around 9:30 p.m consisting of 37,800 doses via Korean Air flight.
- July 14 – The fourteenth batch of Sinovac COVID-19 vaccine (procured) arrived at NAIA around 8 a.m consisting of 1,000,000 doses via Cebu Pacific flight.
- July 15 – The second batch of Moderna COVID-19 vaccine (procured) arrived at NAIA around 5 p.m consisting of 250,800 doses via Singapore Airlines flight.
- July 16
  - The fifth batch of AstraZeneca COVID-19 vaccine (procured) arrived at NAIA around 10 a.m consisting of 1,150,800 doses via China Airlines flight.
  - The first batch of Janssen COVID-19 vaccine (donated) from the US and COVAX arrived at NAIA around 4 p.m consisting of 1,606,600 doses via Emirates flight EK332.
- July 17
  - The country had breached 1.5 M mark on the number of COVID-19 cases as 6,040 fresh cases were added, bringing the cumulative total to 1,502,359. Meanwhile, DOH also recorded 7,213 recoveries, raising total recuperated patients to 1,428,504 which 95.1% of the total case. However, death total was increased to 26,598 as 122 succumbed patients were added to the list.
  - The fifteenth batch of Sinovac COVID-19 vaccine (procured) arrived at NAIA around 8 a.m consisting of 1,500,000 doses via Cebu Pacific flight.
  - The second batch of Janssen COVID-19 vaccine arrived (donated) from the US and COVAX at NAIA around 4 p.m consisting of 1,632,800 doses via Emirates flight EK332.
- July 21 – The third batch of Pfizer–BioNTech COVID-19 vaccine (procured) arrived at NAIA around 6:45 p.m consisting of 511,290 doses via Air Hong Kong flight.
- July 22 – The sixteenth batch of Sinovac COVID-19 vaccine (procured) arrived at NAIA around 7:48 a.m consisting of 1,500,000 doses via Cebu Pacific flight.
- July 23 – The seventeenth batch of Sinovac COVID-19 vaccine (procured) arrived at NAIA around 7 a.m consisting of 1,000,000 doses via Cebu Pacific flight.
- July 26 – The fourth batch of Pfizer–BioNTech COVID-19 vaccine (procured) arrived at NAIA around 6:35 p.m consisting of 375,570 doses via Air Hong Kong flight.
- July 29 – The eighteenth batch of Sinovac COVID-19 vaccine (procured) arrived at NAIA around 7:30 a.m consisting of 1,500,000 doses via Cebu Pacific flight.
- July 30 – The nineteenth batch of Sinovac COVID-19 vaccine (procured) arrived at NAIA around 7:38 a.m consisting of 1,000,000 doses via Cebu Pacific flight.

=== August ===
- August 2 – The sixth batch of AstraZeneca COVID-19 vaccine arrived at NAIA around 4:30 p.m consisting of 415,040 doses from the United Kingdom.
- August 3 – The third batch of Moderna COVID-19 vaccine arrived at NAIA around afternoon consisting of 3,000,060 doses through COVAX.
- August 5 – The twentieth batch of Sinovac COVID-19 vaccine (procured) arrived at NAIA around 7 p.m consisting of 1,000,000 doses via Philippine Airlines flight.
- August 8 – The fourth batch of Moderna COVID-19 vaccine (procured) arrived at NAIA around 4 p.m consisting of 326,400 doses via Singapore Airlines flight.
- August 11
  - The first batch of the Sinopharm BIBP vaccine arrived at NAIA around 1 p.m consisting of 100,000 doses via Etihad Airways flight donated by United Arab Emirates.
  - The fifth batch of Pfizer–BioNTech COVID-19 vaccine (procured) arrived at NAIA around 8:30 p.m consisting of 813,150 doses via Air Hong Kong flight.
- August 12 – The twenty-first batch of Sinovac COVID-19 vaccine (procured) arrived at NAIA around 7 p.m consisting of 2,000,000 doses via Philippine Airlines flight.
- August 13 – The sixth batch of Sputnik V COVID-19 vaccine (procured) arrived at NAIA around 5 p.m consisting of 15,000 doses via Qatar Airways flight QR-932.
- August 20
  - The country logged the highest single day record of new COVID-19 cases which is 17,231, stretching the total cases to 1,807,800 and active cases to 123,251 despite two laboratories failing to submit their reports. This number surpassed the previously recorded 15,310 cases recorded on April 2, 2021. DOH also recorded 5,595 new recoveries and 317 fatalities, bringing the total recuperated patients to 1,653,351 (91.46%) and death toll at 31,198 (1.73%).
  - The second batch of the Sinopharm BIBP vaccine donated by the Chinese government arrived at NAIA Terminal 2 around 5:55 p.m consisting of 739,200 doses via Philippine Airlines flight.
- August 21 – The third batch of the Sinopharm BIBP vaccine (donated) consisting of 260,800 doses and the twenty-second batch of Sinovac vaccine (procured) consisting of 1 M doses arrived at NAIA Terminal 2 around 6:40 a.m. via Philippine Airlines flight.
- August 23
  - FDA approved EUA of Sputnik Light, a single-dose COVID-19 vaccine developed by Russia's Gamaleya Institute as announced by vaccine czar Carlito Galvez, Jr. and later confirmed by FDA Director General Eric Domingo. Efficacy rate of the vaccine is said to be at 79.4% according to Russian Direct Investment Fund.
  - DOH posted a new highest single-day record of fresh cases of COVID-19 with 18,332, pushing the accumulative total cases to 1,857,646. Also reported are 13,794 new recoveries and 151 fatalities bringing the total survivor count to 1,695,335 and death toll to 31,961.
- August 28 – The country recorded a new highest single-day fresh cases with 19,441 pushing active cases and total cases to 142,679 (7.4% ) and 1,935,700 respectively. Meanwhile, DOH also logged 19,191 recuperated patients and 167 deaths, bringing total recoveries and death toll to 1,760,013 (90.9%) and 33,008.
- August 30 - For the 4th time in a single month, new COVID-19 cases in the country reached an all-time high peaking at 22,366 tally, raising active cases and total cases to 148,594(7.5%) and 1,976,202 respectively. Meanwhile, DOH also recorded 16,864 survivors and 222 fatalities, bringing recoveries and death count to 1,794,278 (90.8%) and 33,330 (1.69%).
- August 31 - WHO through its representative Dr. Rabindra Abeyasinghe, confirmed community transmission and dominance of SARS-CoV-2 Delta variant in the country, based on the conducted biosurveillance reporting that 69% of the samples examined were from Delta type.

=== September ===
- September 1 - The country breached the 2-M mark on the total number of COVID-19 cases with 2,003,955 cases cumulatively as DOH reported 14,216 new infections, pushing the number of active cases to 140,949 (7%). Meanwhile, 18,754 new survivors and 86 fatalities were also logged, bringing total number recoveries to 1,829,473 (91.3%) and death toll at 33,533 (1.67%).
- September 3 – FDA approved the amendment to the emergency use authorization for Moderna COVID-19 vaccine for individuals 12–17 years old.
- September 9 - The country logged the highest daily COVID-19 cases with 22,820, bringing active cases to 166,672 (7.7%) and total accumulative count to 2,161,892. DOH also recorded 12,337 new survivors and 61 sucummbed patients, raising total recoveries to 1,960,487 (90.7%) and death toll to 34,733 (1.61%).
- September 10
  - President Rodrigo Duterte through Proclamation No. 1218 extended national state of calamity due to COVID-19 for another year. The chief executive first declared national state of calamity for same reason on March 16, 2020.
  - Another batch of AstraZeneca vaccine (procured) consisting of 502,000 doses arrived at NAIA Terminal 1 at around 9 a.m. via China Airlines Flight CI 701. This supply of vaccine was procured by the Dose of Hope program, a private sector which aims to deliver 6 million vaccines to the people. Meanwhile, National Task Force against COVID-19 claimed 52.8 million of the 187.6 million procured vaccine doses have already arrived in the country.
  - Another batch of Sinovac vaccine (procured) consisting of 1.5 million doses arrived at NAIA Terminal 2 at around 5:55 p.m. via Philippine Airlines Flight PR359. Currently, an estimate of 15 million Filipinos have already completed their vaccination while another 20.8 M have their first inoculation.
- September 11 - The country yet again recorded the highest daily cases of COVID-19 with 26,303 new infections, stretching active cases to 185,706 (8.4%) and total count to 2,206,021. Meanwhile, the death toll climbed to 34,978 (1.59%) with addition of 79 sucummbed patients and total recoveries to 1,985,337 (90%) with 16,013 new survivors.
- September 13 - Another batch of Sinovac vaccine (procured) consisting of 2 million doses arrived at NAIA Terminal 2 at around 7 a.m. via Philippine Airlines flight from Beijing.
- September 18
  - Another batch of Moderna vaccine (procured) consisting of 961,000 doses arrived at NAIA Terminal 1 at around 4 p.m.of via China Airlines flight from the United States. National Task Force Against COVID-19 (NTF) claimed that 712,800 doses were procured by the government while the remaining 248,200 doses were procured by the International Container Terminal Services Inc. (ICTSI).
  - Another of batch Sputnik V COVID-19 vaccine (donated) consisting of 190,000 doses which is allotted for second dose arrived at NAIA Terminal 2 at around 11 p.m. from Russian Direct Investment Fund
- September 19
  - Another batch of Sinovac vaccines (procured) consisting of 3 million doses arrived at NAIA Terminal 2 past 6 p.m.
  - Another batch of Pfizer-BioNTech COVID-19 vaccine consisting of 2,020,590 doses (donated) from COVAX facility arrived at NAIA Terminal 3 around 11:50 p.m. via Emirates Flight EK2520
- September 20 - Another batch of Pfizer-BioNTech COVID-19 vaccines (donated) consisting of 561,500 doses from COVAX facility arrived at NAIA Terminal 3 in the evening via Air Hongkong flight.
- September 22 - Another batch of Pfizer-BioNTech COVID-19 vaccines (procured) consisting of 940,680 doses arrived at NAIA Terminal 3 at around 9:20 p.m via Air Hongkong flight.
- September 23 - Another batch of Pfizer-BioNTech COVID-19 vaccines (procured) consisting of 728,910 doses arrived at NAIA Terminal 3 at around 9:20 p.m via Air Hongkong flight.
- September 26 - Another batch of Sinovac vaccines (procured) consisting of 3 million doses arrived at NAIA Terminal 2 at around 6 p.m. via Philippine Airlines flight. So far, around 69 million doses of combined COVID-19 vaccines have been delivered in the country.
- September 27 - With the addition of 18,449 new cases, the country breached 2.5 million on the number of COVID-19 cases, with cumulative total of 2,509,177 wherein 158,169 (6.3%) are still active cases. Meanwhile, DOH also reported 21,811 new recoveries and 93 fatalities bringing total number of recuperated patients to 2,313,412 (92.2%) and death toll at 37,494 (1.5%).
- September 28
  - President Rodrigo Duterte approved vaccination of general population, including minors, against COVID-19 that will start in October 2021 as announced by Malacañang.
  - President Rodrigo Duterte approved CHED's request to conduct limited face-to-face classes for other 5 degree programs in HEIs under MGCQ which includes Engineering and Technology programs; Hospitality/Hotel and Restaurant Management; Tourism/ Travel Management; Marine Engineering and Marine Transportation.
- September 29 - Another batch of Pfizer vaccines (procured) consisting of 391,000 doses arrived at NAIA Terminal 3 at around 8:30 p.m. via Air Hongkong flight.
- September 30 - Another batch of Moderna COVID-19 vaccines (procured) consisting of 1,233,300 doses arrived at NAIA Terminal 1 at around 9:30 a.m. via China Airlines flight.

=== October ===
- October 1
  - Another batch of Pfizer vaccines (donated) consisting of 883,350 doses from COVAX Facility arrived at NAIA Terminal 3 at around 4:15 p.m. via Emirates flight.
  - Another batch of Sinovac vaccines (procured) consisting of 2.5 million doses arrived at NAIA Terminal 2 at around 5:40 p.m. via Philippine Airlines flight.
- October 2 - Another batch of Pfizer vaccines (donated) from COVAX Facility consisting of 889,200 doses arrived at NAIA Terminal 3 at around 4:15 p.m via Emirates flight EK332.
- October 3
  - Another batch of Pfizer vaccines (donated) from COVAX Facility consisting of 1,813,500 doses arrived at NAIA Terminal 1 at around 3:30 a.m. via De Havilland Beaver U-6A flight.
  - The country recorded the highest single-day increase on the number of survivors which is 45,249, bringing the total recoveries to 2,442,623 (94.19%). Meanwhile, 13,273 new infections and 112 deaths were also logged raising the total cases to 2,593,399 (112,008 or 4.32% as active cases) and fatalities to 38,768 (1.49%).
- October 6 - Another batch of Pfizer vaccines (procured) consisting of 1,015,560 doses in which 76,050 doses allocated for Visayas first arrived at Mactan–Cebu International Airport around 6:35 p.m.; and 862,290 doses allocated for Luzon arrived at NAIA Terminal 3 at around 8:30 p.m., via Air Hong Kong flight. The remaining 77,220 doses allocated for Mindanao arrived at Francisco Bangoy International Airport on October 7, 2021, morning via Philippine Airlines flight PR 1181.
- October 7 - Another batch of Pfizer vaccines (procured) consisting of 1,003,860 doses in which 141,570 doses (allocated for Visayas) first arrived at MCIA in the evening, followed by 797,940 doses (allocated for Luzon) at NAIA Terminal 3 at around 8:45 p.m. via Air Hongkong flight LD-456. The remaining 64,350 doses (allocated for Mindanao) arrived at FBIA on October 8, 2021, morning.
- October 8
  - Another batch of Moderna vaccines (procured) consisting of 2,132,140 doses arrived at NAIA Terminal 1 at around 9:30 a.m. via China Airlines flight CI 701.
  - Another batch of AstraZeneca vaccines (procured) consisting of 661,100 doses also at NAIA Terminal 1 around 9:30 a.m via same China Airlines flight CI 701.
- October 9 - Another batch of Moderna vaccines (procured) consisting of 1,363,300 doses arrived at NAIA Terminal 1 at around 4:00 p.m. via China Airlines flight CI 703.
- October 10 - Another batch of Pfizer vaccines (donated) consisting of 918,450 doses from COVAX Facility arrived at NAIA Terminal 3 at around 4:15 p.m. via Emirates flight EK332.
- October 11
  - Another batch of Pfizer vaccines (donated) consisting of 924,300 doses from COVAX Facility arrived at NAIA Terminal 3 at around 4:00 p.m. via Emirates flight.
  - Another batch of Pfizer vaccines (procured) consisting of 272,610 doses arrived at NAIA Terminal 3 at around 9:20 p.m. via Air Hong Kong flight.
- October 14 - Another batch of Pfizer vaccines (procured) consisting of 1,015,560 doses - 76,050 doses arrived at MCIA at around 6:35 p.m.; 862,290 doses at NAIA Terminal 3 at around 9:35 p.m. via an Air Hongkong flight; and the remaining 77,220 doses arrived at FBIA Friday morning via PAL Flight PR 1809 .
- October 15
  - Another batch of AstraZeneca vaccines (donated) by Germany consisting of 844,800 doses from COVAX Facility arrived at NAIA Terminal 3 via Emirates Flight EK332 at around 4 p.m.
  - Another batch of Pfizer vaccines (procured) consisting of 1,068,210 doses arrived at NAIA Terminal 3 via Air Hongkong Flight at around 9 p.m.
- October 16
  - Another batch of Sputnik V vaccines (procured) consisting of 720,000 doses arrived at NAIA Terminal 3 via Emirates Flight EK332 at around 4 p.m.
  - Another batch of Pfizer vaccines (procured) consisting of 207,090 doses arrived at NAIA Terminal 3 at around 9 p.m. via Air Hongkong flight.
- October 20 - A batch of AstraZeneca COVID-19 vaccine (donated) consisting of 2,000 doses from the government of Brunei arrived at NAIA Terminal 1 at 2:10 p.m. on board a Royal Brunei Airlines aircraft flight BI 683.
- October 21
  - A batch of Pfizer COVID-19 vaccine (procured) consisting of 1,014,390 doses landed at NAIA Terminal 3 at around 10 p.m. via an Air Hong Kong plane.
  - A batch of Sputnik V COVID-19 vaccine (procured) consisting of 400,000 jabs arrived at NAIA Terminal 3 at around 10 p.m. via a Qatar Airways flight.
- October 22
  - A batch of AstraZeneca COVID-19 vaccine (procured) for a private sector under "Dose of Hope" program consisting of 698,600 vials inside RAP80995 PC envirotainer via a China Airlines flight arrived at NAIA Terminal 1 at early morning.
  - A batch of Pfizer COVID-19 vaccine (procured) consisting of 1,016,730 shots arrived at NAIA Terminal 3 past 10 p.m. via Air Hong Kong flight.
- October 24 - A batch of Sinovac COVID-19 vaccine consisting of 3 million doses (1 million donated and 2 million procured) from China arrived at NAIA Terminal 2 past 6 p.m. on board a Philippine Airlines flight.
- October 27 - Another batch of Pfizer vaccine (procured) consisting of 976,950 doses arrived at NAIA Terminal 3 around 9 p.m. via an Air Hongkong flight.
- October 28 - The country received a batch of AstraZeneca COVID-19 vaccine (donated) from the government of Japan consisting of 896,000 shots landed at NAIA Terminal 1 at 12:30 p.m. via an All Nippon Airways flight.
- October 29 - A batch of Pfizer vaccine (procured) consisting of 976,440 doses arrived at NAIA Terminal 3 at around 9:10 p.m. via Air Hong Kong flight LD3458.
- October 30
  - A batch of AstraZeneca COVID-19 vaccine (donated) from the government of Japan consisting of 1,065,600 jabs landed at NAIA Terminal 1 at past 12:30 p.m. via an ANA Cargo flight.
  - A batch of AstraZeneca COVID-19 vaccine (donated) from COVAX facility consisting of 1,546,200 vials arrived at NAIA Terminal 3 at past 3 p.m. via an Emirates flight.
- October 31 - The country received a batch of Pfrizer COVID-19 vaccine (donated) from the US through COVAX facility consisting of 2,098,980 doses arrived at NAIA Terminal 2 at around 7:00 p.m. via a Silk Way West Airlines flight. In total, the country already received 100,528,240 COVID-19 vaccine doses.

=== November ===
- November 2 - A batch of Sputnik V COVID-19 vaccines (procured) consisting of 2.7 million shots (1,350,000 doses each of Sputnik V Components I and II), arrived at NAIA Terminal 2 at around 3 p.m. via Philippine Airlines Flight PR8623.
- November 8 - President Rodrigo Duterte personally welcomed the arrival of Sputnik V COVID-19 vaccines (procured) consisting of 2,805,000 doses at Villamor Air Base, Pasay City, delivered via Air Bridge Cargo Airlines at around 7:30 p.m.
- November 9 - A batch of AstraZeneca COVID-19 vaccine (donated) consisting of 793,900 doses from COVAX facility from the government of Germany arrived at NAIA Terminal 3 past 4 p.m. via Emirates Flight EK332.
- November 10
  - A batch of Sinovac COVID-19 vaccines (procured) consisting of 3 million vials arrived at NAIA Terminal 2 at around 11 a.m via Philippine Airlines flight.
  - A batch of Pfizer COVID-19 vaccine (procured) consisting of 866,970 shots arrived at NAIA Terminal 3 shortly before 9 p.m. via an Air Hongkong flight.
- November 11
  - A batch of Sinovac COVID-19 vaccines (procured) consisting of 3 million jabs from China landed at NAIA Terminal 2 at around 6 p.m. via Philippine Airline flight PR359.
  - A batch of Pfizer COVID-19 (procured) consisting of 866,970 doses from the US arrived at NAIA Terminal 3 at around 9 p.m. via Air HongKong flight LD456.
- November 13 - A batch of Moderna COVID-19 vaccine (procured) consisting of 1,279,000 vials arrived at NAIA Terminal 1 via China Airlines flight CI701 at roughly 10 a.m.
- November 12 - IATF-EID approved the DFA's recommendation to recognize COVID-19 vaccination certificates from the following countries: Albania, Australia, Austria, Colombia, Czech Republic, Egypt, Georgia, Greece, India, Iraq, Ireland, Italy, Japan, Kazakhstan, Maldives, Malta, Monaco, Netherlands, Palau, Samoa, Singapore, Tunisia, Turkey, United Arab Emirates, United Kingdom, Uruguay, and Vietnam.
- November 15 - A batch of Pfizer COVID-19 vaccines (donated) consisting of 301,860 doses from the United States through WHO and COVAX arrived at past 10 p.m. at NAIA Terminal 3 via an Air Hongkong flight. Currently, the country already received a total of 123,560,200 vaccine doses.
- November 16 - A batch of Moderna COVID-19 vaccines (procured) consisting of 1.3 million vials arrived at NAIA Terminal 1 at around 9 a.m. via a China Airlines flight.
- November 17
  - Country's FDA approved EUA of Novavax COVID-19 vaccine, developed by Serum Institute of India and Novavax.
  - A batch of Sinovac vaccine (procured) consisting of 3,530,400 doses arrived at NAIA Terminal 2 past 7 a.m. via a PAL flight.
- November 18 - A batch of Pfizer-BioNTech vaccine (procured) consisting of additional 609,570 doses arrived at NAIA Terminal 3 around 9:20 p.m. via Air Hong Kong flight LD456.
- November 19
  - A batch of Moderna COVID-19 vaccines (procured) consisting of 1,306,000 jabs arrived at NAIA Terminal 1 at 9:51 a.m. via a China Airlines flight.
  - The first batch of Sputnik Light (donated), a single dose COVID-19 vaccine developed by Moscow's Gamaleya Institute, consisting of 5,000 doses arrived at NAIA Terminal 2 past 2 p.m. via AirBridge Cargo flight RU9230. Accompanied with this flight is a batch of Sputnik V vaccine (procured) consisting of 2,805,000 vials.
  - A batch of additional Pfizer-BioNTech vaccine (procured) consisting of additional 609,570 doses arrived at NAIA Terminal 3 past 9 p.m. via Air HongKong flight.
- November 20 - A batch of Pfizer-BioNTech vaccine (procured) consisting of 609,570 doses arrived at NAIA Terminal 3 past 8 p.m. via an Air Hong Kong flight.
- November 24 - A batch of AstraZeneca COVID-19 vaccines (donated) from Australia arrived at NAIA Terminal 3 at around 10:05 a.m via Cathay Pacific Airlines flight CX907.
  - A batch of additional Pfizer-BioNTech vaccines (procured) consisting of additional 609,570 doses arrived at NAIA Terminal 3 past 9 p.m. via Air HongKong flight.
- November 25
  - A batch of AstraZeneca COVID-19 vaccines (donated) from the United Kingdom (UK) through the Covax Facility consisting of 3,191,040 vials arrived at NAIA Terminal 3 at 4:03 p.m. via Emirates Flight EK332.
  - A batch of Pfizer-BioNTech COVID-19 vaccines (procured) consisting of 1,017,900 shots landed at NAIA Terminal 3 at around 8 p.m. via an Air HongKong flight.
- November 30 - The country received a batch of AstraZeneca COVID-19 vaccine (donated) from South Korea consisting of 539,430 doses which arrived at NAIA Terminal 3 at around 8 p.m. via Air Hong Kong flight LD456.

=== December ===
- December 1 - The country received a batch of AstraZeneca vaccines (donated) from the government of France through COVAX consisting of 1,632,900 doses which arrived at NAIA Terminal 3 around 4 p.m. via Emirates flight EK 332.
- December 2 - A batch of Pfizer vaccine doses (procured) consisting of 1,082,250 shots landed at NAIA Terminal 3 around 8 p.m. via Air Hong Kong flight LD456.
- December 6
  - A batch of Moderna COVID-19 vaccine (procured) consisting of 1,497,200 doses arrived at NAIA Terminal 1 past around 3:30 p.m via China Airlines.
  - A batch of Pfizer BioNTech vaccine (procured) consisting of 1,085,760 doses landed at NAIA Terminal 3 at around 9 p.m. via Air Hong Kong flight.
- December 8 - A batch of Pfizer BioNTech vaccine (procured) consisting of 1,082,250 arrived at NAIA Terminal 3 at around 8:30 p.m. via an Air Hong Kong flight.
- December 9
  - A batch of Astrazeneca vaccines (procured) for a private sector consisting of 255,200 shots landed at NAIA Terminal 1 morning via a Korean Air flight.
  - A batch of Pfizer BioNTech vaccine (procured) consisting of 1,017,900 jabs arrived at NAIA Terminal 3 evening via Air Hong Kong flight LD456.
- December 10
  - A batch of Moderna vaccines (procured) consisting of 2,948,000 doses - 2,102,000 doses were purchased by the government, while 846,000 doses were bought by the private sector, landed at NAIA Terminal 1 around 9:35 a.m. via China Airlines flight CI701.
  - A batch of AstraZeneca vaccine (procured) consisting of 698,600 vials arrived at NAIA Terminal 1 around 9:35 a.m. via the same China Airlines flight CI701.
- December 13
  - A batch of Pfizer BioNTech vaccine (procured) consisting of 859,950 doses landed at NAIA Terminal 3 at 9:05 p.m. via Air Hong Kong flight LD456.
- December 14
  - The country received additional Sinovac's COVID-19 vaccine (donated) from China consisting of 2 million doses which landed at NAIA Terminal 2 via Philippine Airlines flight PR359 around 6 p.m.
  - Additional batch of Moderna vaccine (donated) from the French government consisting of 1,058,400 doses and from the government of consisting of Spain consisting of 453,600 shots through COVAX which landed at NAIA Terminal 3 around 4 p.m. via Emirates flight EK332.
  - The country also received Johnson and Johnson Janssen COVID-19 (donated) from the Ductch government consisting of 945,600 vials Janssen which arrived at NAIA Terminal 3 around 4 p.m. via Qatar Airways flight QR932.
- December 15
  - DOH recorded first two cases of COVID-19 Omicron variant which came from the samples taken from a Returning Overseas Filipino (ROF) from Japan who arrived on December 1 via Philippine Airlines PR 0427 and a Nigerian national who arrived from Nigeria on November 30 via Oman Air WY 843.
  - The country received a batch of AstraZeneca vaccine (donated) from the British government consisting of 214,500 jabs which arrived at NAIA Terminal 3 via Emirates flight EK332 around 4 p.m.
  - The country received a batch of Moderna vaccine (donated) from Germany through COVAX consisting of 856,800 doses which landed NAIA Terminal 3 past 4 p.m via Qatar Airways flight QR932.
  - The country also received a batch of Janssen COVID-19 vaccine (donated) from the government of Germany and Netherlands consisting of 3,055,200 doses through COVAX which landed NAIA Terminal 3 past 4 p.m via the same Qatar Airways flight QR932.
  - A batch of Pfizer BioNTech vaccine (procured) consisting of 1,187,550 doses arrived NAIA Terminal 3 via Air Hong Kong flight LD456 around 8 p.m.
  - A batch of AstraZeneca vaccine (procured) bought by private sector consisting of 2,249,400 shots arrived at NAIA Terminal 3 around 9 p.m. via Korean Air flight KE623.
  - The country received a batch of Moderna vaccine (donated) from the German government consisting of 2,840,100 shots through COVAX which arrived at NAIA 3 around 10 p.m. via Qatar Airways QR928.
- December 17
  - The country received a batch of Moderna vaccine (donated) from the German government through COVAX consisting of 1,020,500 doses which landed at NAIA Terminal 3 shortly before 4 p.m. via Singapore Airlines Flight SQ912.
  - The country received a batch of AstraZeneca (donated) from the government of Argentina through COVAX consisting of 500,000 doses which landed at NAIA Terminal 3 around 4 p.m. via a Singapore Airlines flight.
  - A batch of Pfizer BioNTech vaccine (procured) consisting of 1,164,150 vials arrived at NAIA Terminal 3 past 9 p.m. via an Air Hong Kong flight.
  - Additional batch of Moderna vaccine (donated) from Germany through COVAX consisting of 940,800 shots arrived at NAIA Terminal 3 past 10 p.m. via a Singapore Airlines flight.
- December 18 - The country received a fresh batch of Pfrizer BioNTech vaccine (donated) from the French government through COVAX consisting of 811,980 doses which arrived at NAIA Terminal 3 past 9 p.m. via an Air Hong Kong flight.
- December 19
  - The country received a batch of Moderna vaccine (donated) from the German government through COVAX consisting of 1,062,100 doses which landed at NAIA Terminal 3 shortly before 4 p.m. via a Singapore Airlines flight.
  - A batch of AstraZeneca vaccine (procured) for a private sector consisting of 663,400 shots arrived at NAIA Terminal 3 around 7:30 p.m. via a KLM Royal Dutch Airlines flight.
  - Another batch of Moderna vaccine (donated) from Germany through COVAX consisting of 535,300 jabs arrived at NAIA Terminal 3 around 10 p.m. via a Singapore Airlines flight.
- December 20
  - A batch of Pfizer's COVID-19 vaccine (procured) consisting of 976,950 vials arrived at NAIA Terminal 3 around 9 p.m. via Air Hong Kong flight.
  - The country received a batch of Pfizer vaccine (donated) from the US through COVAX consisting of 1,776,060 shots which landed at NAIA Terminal 3 around 4 p.m. via an Emirates flight.
- December 21
  - The country logged the lowest daily cases of COVID-19 this year which is 168 fresh cases, bringing the cumulative tally of 2,837,719 with 9,384 (0.31%) as active cases. It is also the lowest record since May 2020. Meanwhile, DOH also recorded 372 new recoveries and 10 fatalities, raising recuperated patient numbers to 2,777,541 (97.9%) and death toll at 50,794 (1.79%)
  - The country received a batch of Pfizer's COVID-19 vaccine (donated) consisting of 1,623,960 shots and AstraZeneca's COVID-19 vaccine (donated) consisting of 1,697,000 vials, from US and French government respectively through COVAX which arrived at NAIA Terminal 1 at around 6 a.m. via Emirates flight EK334.
  - A batch of Moderna vaccine (procured) consisting of 1,358,600 doses arrived at NAIA Terminal 1 around 9 p.m via Korean Air flight KE623.
  - The country received a batch of AstraZeneca vaccine (donated) from the government of Argentina consisting of 500,000 doses which landed at NAIA Terminal 3 via Turkish Airlines flight TK0084 at around 8 p.m.
- December 22 - The country received a batch of Pfizer vaccine (donated) from the French government through COVAX consisting of 810,810 doses which arrived at NAIA Terminal around 9 p.m. via Air Hong Kong flight LD456, .
- December 23
  - FDA approved for the first anti-COVID pill emergency use authorization for Molnupiravir.
  - FDA approved the amendment to the emergency use authorization for Pfizer COVID-19 vaccine for individuals 5–11 years old.
  - A batch of Pfizer COVID-19 vaccine (procured) consisting of 1,187,550 doses landed at NAIA Terminal 3 past 8 p.m. via an Air Hong Kong flight.
  - The country received a batch of Moderna COVID-19 vaccine (donated) from the government of Germany through COVAX consisting of 1,531,000 jabs which landed at NAIA Terminal 1 via an Emirates flight.
- December 24
  - A batch of Pfizer-BioNTech vaccine (procured) consisting of 1,405,170 doses arrived at NAIA Terminal 1 at 3:40 am via an Emirates flight.
- December 25 - Metro Manila becomes the first region in the country to meet its 70% vaccination goal, with 9.59 million individuals have been fully vaccinated as of this date.
- December 27
  - A batch of Moderna vaccine (donated) from the government of Germany through COVAX consisting of 587,800 doses landed at NAIA Terminal 3 past 4 p.m. via Emirates flight EK 322.
  - A batch of Pfizer vaccine (procured) consisting of 1,187,550 vials arrived at NAIA Terminal 3 around 9 p.m. via Air Hong Kong flight LD 456.
- December 28
  - A batch of Astrazeneca vaccine (procured) consisting of 2,005,300 doses landed at NAIA Terminal 1 around 11 a.m. via Korean Air flight KE621.
  - A batch of Pfizer BioNTech COVID-19 vaccine (procured) consisting of 367,380 doses arrived NAIA Terminal 3 at 9:05 pm via an Air Hong Kong flight LD456.
- December 29
  - A batch of AstraZeneca COVID-19 vaccine (procured) consisting of 1,981,500 doses arrived at NAIA Terminal 1 around 11 a.m. via a Korean Air flight
  - A batch of Moderna vaccine (procured) consisting of 1,357,300 jabs arrived at NAIA Terminal 1 around 1:20 p.m. via a Korean Air flight.
  - A batch of Moderna vaccine (procured) consisting of 1,230,800 shots arrived at NAIA Terminal 1 past 9 p.m. via a Korean Air flight.
  - Upon the recommendation of the DFA, the IATF issued the Resolution No. 154-E, recognizing the COVID-19 vaccination certificates of 11 countries - Armenia, Belgium, Canada, France, Germany, Kuwait, New Zealand, Oman, Sri Lanka, Thailand, and United States, for purposes of arrival quarantine protocols as well as for interzonal/intrazonal movement.
- December 30 - A batch of Prizer COVID-19 vaccine (procured) consisting of 609,570 doses arrived at NAIA Terminal 3 before 9 p.m. via an Air Hong Kong flight. This is also the last shipment of Pfizer vaccine for 2021, completing the country's agreement of 40 million vials for the said drug maker.

== See also ==
- 2021 in the Philippines
- COVID-19 vaccination in the Philippines
- Philippine government response to the COVID-19 pandemic
