= Rajendra Achyut Badwe =

Indian oncologist

- Born: Mumbai, Maharashtra, India
- Awards: Padma Shri; Lal Bahadur Shastri National Award; Reach to Recovery International Medal; Joglekar Gold Medal; C. V. Menon Gold Medal; Life Time Achievement Award; Outstanding Service Award

Rajendra Achyut Badwe, is an Indian medical doctor and surgical oncologist. He received the Padma Shri, India's fourth highest civilian award, for his contributions to the field of medicine. He is the former Director of Tata Memorial Centre, succeeded by Sudeep Gupta

== Biography ==
Rajendra Achyut Badwe was born in Mumbai, in the western Indian state of Maharashtra, in 1956. Reported to be a bright student and a winner of the Athalye Medal for Maths, Badwe chose medicine and studied with the Dorab Tata Scholarship, to graduate in medicine (MBBS) in 1978. He was confused about taking engineering or medicine but went with the latter after a coin toss. His post graduation was in general surgery and he secured an MS from Bombay University.

Badwe worked in many institutions of repute before joining Tata Memorial Hospital, Mumbai as the Head of the Department of Surgical Oncology, he worked at the Toronomon Hospital, Tokyo as a Fellow of the International Society for Diseases of the Oesophagus in 1989 and moved to London and worked as the Registrar and honorary consultant at the Guy's Hospital, King's College London School of Medicine and the Royal Marsden Hospital, till 1992.

Rajendra Badwe lives in Mumbai.

== Legacy ==
Badwe is considered an expert in oncology; his opinions are reportedly considered for devising cancer care strategies, disease management and research protocols worldwide. He is credited with pioneering research in breast cancer treatment, which is his specialty. Some of his researches, such as the one where he subjected 350 women with advanced stages of cancer to chemotherapy are well documented. His studies revealed that the survival rate in cases where surgical procedures are resorted to is almost the same as the cases where only medication was administered and medicines are potent enough to combat breast cancer with the same efficacy as surgery. One of his researches, on the Timing of surgery during the menstrual cycle for operable breast cancer has positive effects on the cancer treatment regimes in the US and the UK. His contributions in the areas such as breast cancer, circulating tumour cells, DNA in solid tumours, clinical research methodology, and epidemiological research in oncology are reported to have enabled a better understanding of the cancer biology and in the development of life saving treatments patterns globally. He is also known for his contributions to contemporary management of oral cavity cancers, leading the first randomized study to demonstrate the benefit of prophylactic treatment of neck lymph nodes in patients without evident nodal disease before surgery.

It is reported that Badwe initiated and implemented the Clinical Research Secretariat for the first time in India. He was also behind the establishment of the Department of Atomic Energy Clinical Trials Centres for multi-centre clinical trials. His mammoth research covering 1000 breast cancer patients in India had a reported effect in reducing breast cancer deaths by 25 per cent.

Badwe has published over 100 research articles in various peer-reviewed international and national journals. He serves as a peer reviewer for many journals such as Lancet, British Journal of Cancer, Cancer, International Journal of Surgery, Annals of Oncology, Indian Journal of Surgery and the Indian Journal of Cancer. He has also served as a member of the editorials boards of journals like The Breast Journal and the International Journal of Surgery and Mammology.

Badwe also delivers keynote addresses at various medical seminars.

== Positions ==
Rajendra Badwe is the former director of the Tata Memorial Centre and the head of the Department of Surgical Oncology, Tata Memorial Hospital, Mumbai. He is also a member of the International Atomic Energy Agency panel of experts.

The Government of India has utilised his services for setting up cancer care centres in Andhra Pradesh and Punjab. He was a key advisor to the government in the establishment of a National Cancer Centre and six All India Institutes in the fashion of the All India Institute of Medical Sciences. Dr. Badwe is also an advisor to the Government of India, Breast Health Global Initiative and the World Health Organization (WHO) and is the head of the Innovation Council for Cancer Research, a Government of India programme.

- Member of the Governing Council - All India Institute of Medical Sciences, Delhi
- Member - Committee on non-communicable diseases - Indian Council of Medical Research
- Member - Committee on non-communicable diseases - Department of Bio Technology - Ministry of Science and Technology - Government of India

== Awards and recognitions ==
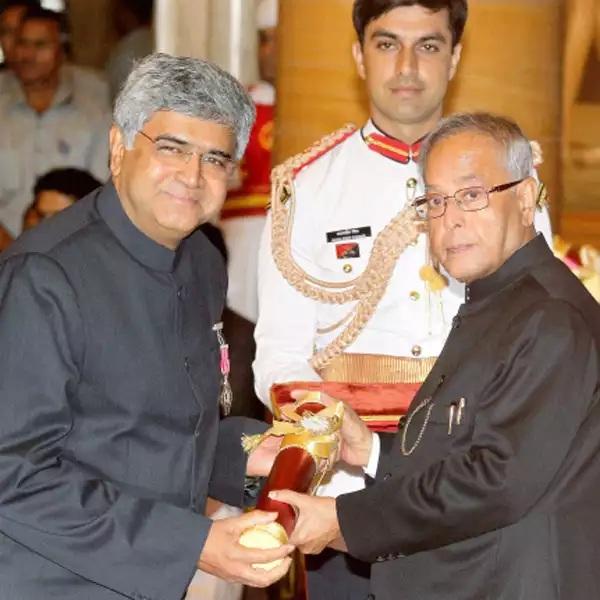
Pranab Mukherjee presents Padma Shri to Rajendra Achyut Badwe

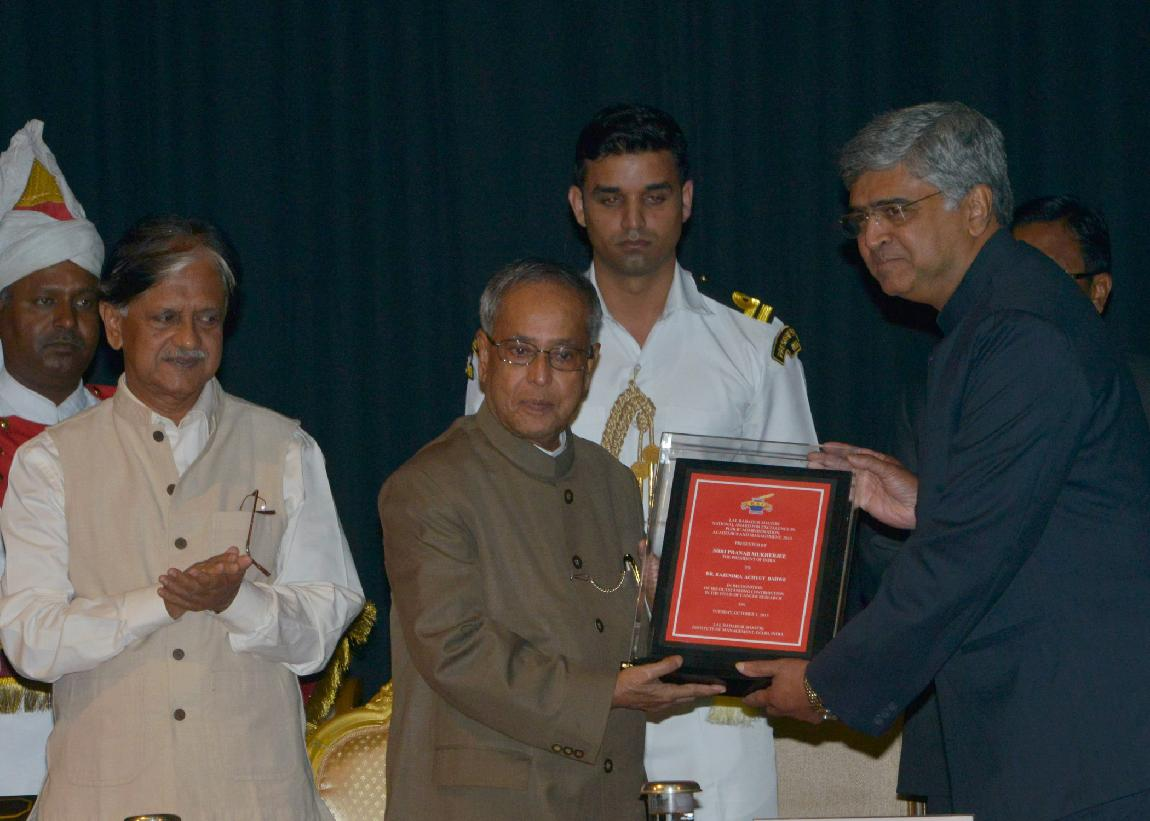
President of India, presenting the Lal Bahadur Shastri National Award for Excellence in Public Administration, Academics & Management to Dr R A Badwe

Badwe received two awards of repute, in 2013. In January, the Government of India conferred on him the fourth highest civilian award of Padma Shri. Nine months later, in October, the Lal Bahadur Shastri Institute of Management recognised Dr. badwe's services by way of the Lal Bahadur Shastri National Award.

He has also received many other awards such as the Reach to Recovery International Medal of the International Union Against Cancer (UICC), Joglekar Gold Medal in 1993, C. V. Menon Gold Medal in 1994 and the Life Time Achievement Award in 2010 and the Outstanding Service Award, both of the Indian Nuclear Society.

== See also ==
- Tata Memorial Hospital
- Breast cancer
