= Yash Pal =

Indian physicist (1926–2017)

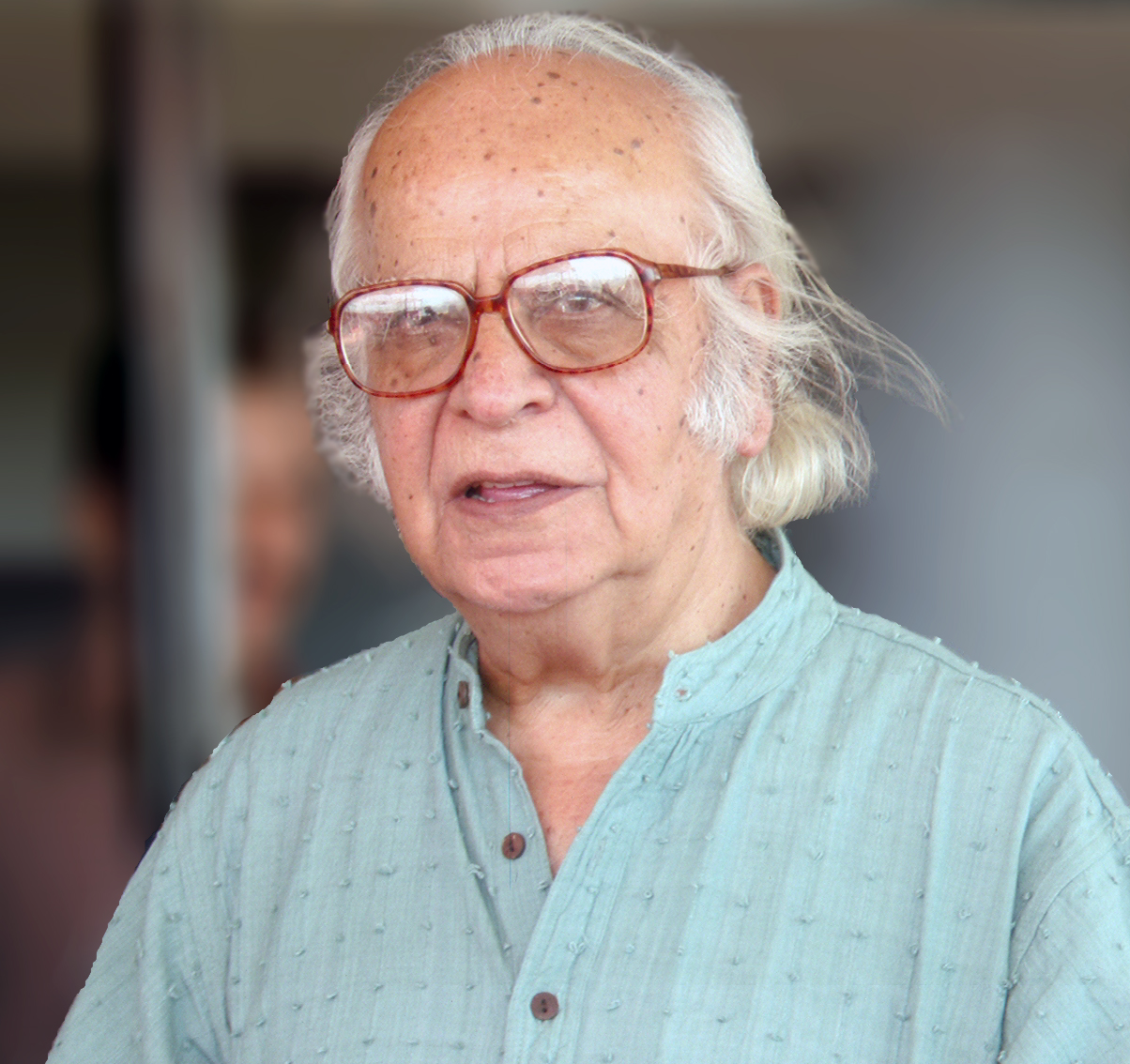
- Prof. Yash Pal at the inauguration of the IUCAA Girawali Observatory in 2006
- Born: Yash Pal; 26 November 1926; Jhang, British India (now in Punjab, Pakistan)
- Died: 24 July 2017 (aged 90); Noida, Uttar Pradesh, India
- Citizenship: Indian
- Education: University of the Punjab; Panjab University, Chandigarh; MIT
- Known for: Space science, Education, Television anchor, Public Outreach
- Awards: Padma Vibhushan (2013); Padma Bhushan (1976); Marconi Prize (1980); Lal Bahadur Shastri National Award; Kalinga Award (2009)
- Scientific career
- Fields: Physics, Astrophysics
- Workplaces: TIFR, Mumbai, Space Applications Centre, Ahmedabad, University Grants Commission (India)
- Doctoral advisor: Bruno Rossi

Yash Pal (26 November 1926 – 24 July 2017) was an Indian scientist, educator and educationist. He was known for his contributions to the study of cosmic rays, as well as for being an institution-builder. In his later years, he became one of the leading science communicators of the country.

Starting his career at Tata Institute of Fundamental Research (TIFR), he later remained Chairman of the University Grants Commission from 1986 to 1991. In 2013, he was awarded India's second highest civilian honour, the Padma Vibhushan.

== Early life ==
Yash Pal was born in 1926 in Jhang, Punjab Province, British India, now in Pakistan. The town Jhang was also the place of birth of Yash Pal's contemporary, Abdus Salam, the renowned theoretical physicist and the only Pakistani Physics Nobel laureate. He had a peaceful life in the town of Quetta with his parents until the disastrous 1935 Quetta earthquake (the deadliest earthquake in South Asia until 2005 with over 60,000 casualties) when young Yash Pal and his siblings (a brother and a sister) were rescued from beneath the remains of the buildings that were razed down to ground. Since the town was recovering and being rebuilt, he could not attend school for a year. He was raised in Kaithal district, Haryana.

=== Education ===
During 1945–1947, he studied for BSc Honours in Physics at the Lahore campus of the undivided University of the Punjab, where he also participated in the Students Union at Lahore as a student activist. As he was entering the final year of BSc in 1947, his studies were disrupted once again due to partition. He was then visiting Delhi due to his father's job transfer and could not return to Lahore to resume his studies due to the riots that broke out after partition. Eventually, a group of students including Yash Pal and their teachers who had all migrated from Lahore, were able to convert some obsolete WW2 army barracks in Delhi into operational classrooms, supported by Prof. D.S. Kothari (a professor of physics at Delhi University) among others.

During 1947–1949, he continued his studies in the Delhi campus of the newly carved up Panjab University. He received the MSc degree in Physics from Panjab University in 1949. Later on, he moved to Boston, United States to pursue doctoral studies and obtained the PhD degree in Physics from the Massachusetts Institute of Technology in 1958.

== Career ==
Yash Pal started his career at the Tata Institute of Fundamental Research (TIFR), Bombay (now Mumbai), as a member of the Cosmic Rays group. He went to Massachusetts Institute of Technology for his PhD and returned to TIFR, where he remained until 1983.

In 1972, the Government of India set up its Department of Space and embarked on an independent space programme. Yash Pal took charge as the first Director of the newly set up Space Applications Centre, Ahmedabad, in 1973. At the same time, he continued to be on the faculty of TIFR.

Yash Pal's administrative assignments at the government-level and beyond began with his appointment as the Secretary General of the Second United Nations Conference on Peaceful Uses of Outer Space (1981–82). He held the posts of Chief Consultant, Planning Commission (1983–84) and Secretary, Department of Science and Technology (1984–1986), after which he was appointed chairman, University Grants Commission (UGC) (1986–91). During his tenure as UGC chairman, he advocated the setting up of Inter-University Centres funded by the UGC, on the model of the Nuclear Science Centre (now Inter-University Accelerator Centre), New Delhi. Institutions such as the Inter-University Centre for Astronomy and Astrophysics (IUCAA) emerged from this vision.

Pal was a member of UN Advisory Committee on Science and Technology for Development, Scientific Council, International Centre for Theoretical Physics, Trieste and Executive Committee and United Nations University, and he was Vice President of International Union of Pure and Applied Physics Indian National Science Academy in the year 1980–1981.

He was the Chancellor of Jawaharlal Nehru University (2007-2012).

=== Education ===
==== School education ====
Pal's involvement in school education dates back to the early 1970s, with the pathbreaking Hoshangabad Science Teaching Programme.

In 1993, the Ministry of Human Resource Development (MHRD), Government of India, set up a National Advisory Committee, with Yash Pal as chairman, to go into the issue of overburdening of school children. The report of the committee, entitled "Learning without Burden", is now regarded as a seminal document in Indian education.

When the National Council of Educational Research and Training embarked on the exercise of drawing up the National Curriculum Framework, Pal was asked to chair its steering committee. The Executive Summary of the NCF 2005 document states that the curriculum review exercise was undertaken "in the light of the report, Learning Without Burden (1993)".

==== Higher education ====
Pal's role as UGC chairman has already been described above.

In 2009, the MHRD set up a Committee on Higher Education with Pal as the chairman, for examining reform of higher education in India. In its report, the Committee laid emphasis on the idea of a university, and advocated a number of major structural changes. However, it is not clear whether the Government intends to take any action on the basis of the report.

He submitted a report on "Renovation and Rejuvenation of Higher Education in India" to the Ministry of Human Resource Development on 24 June 2009. He filed the case, Prof. Yashpal & Anr vs State of Chhattisgarh & Ors in the Supreme Court against a law, Chhattisgarh Niji Kshetra Vishwavidyalaya (Sthapana Aur Viniyaman) Adhiniyam, 2002 which is used to establish universities without regulatory approvals and necessary infrastructure. He won the case in February 2005 and 112 private universities formed under the said law in Chhattisgarh had to be closed.

==== Science communication ====
Yash Pal is known for regular appearances on the science programme Turning Point telecast on Doordarshan and for explaining scientific concepts in layman's language, along with participation on advisory boards for televised science programmes such as Bharat ki Chaap.

For the English daily The Tribune, he answered readers' science-related questions.

== Death ==
He died due to old age related illnesses on 24 July 2017 in Noida, Uttar Pradesh.

== Views ==
He was an atheist, and opposed belief in deities, astrology and religious rituals, dismissing them as unscientific.

== Awards and honours ==
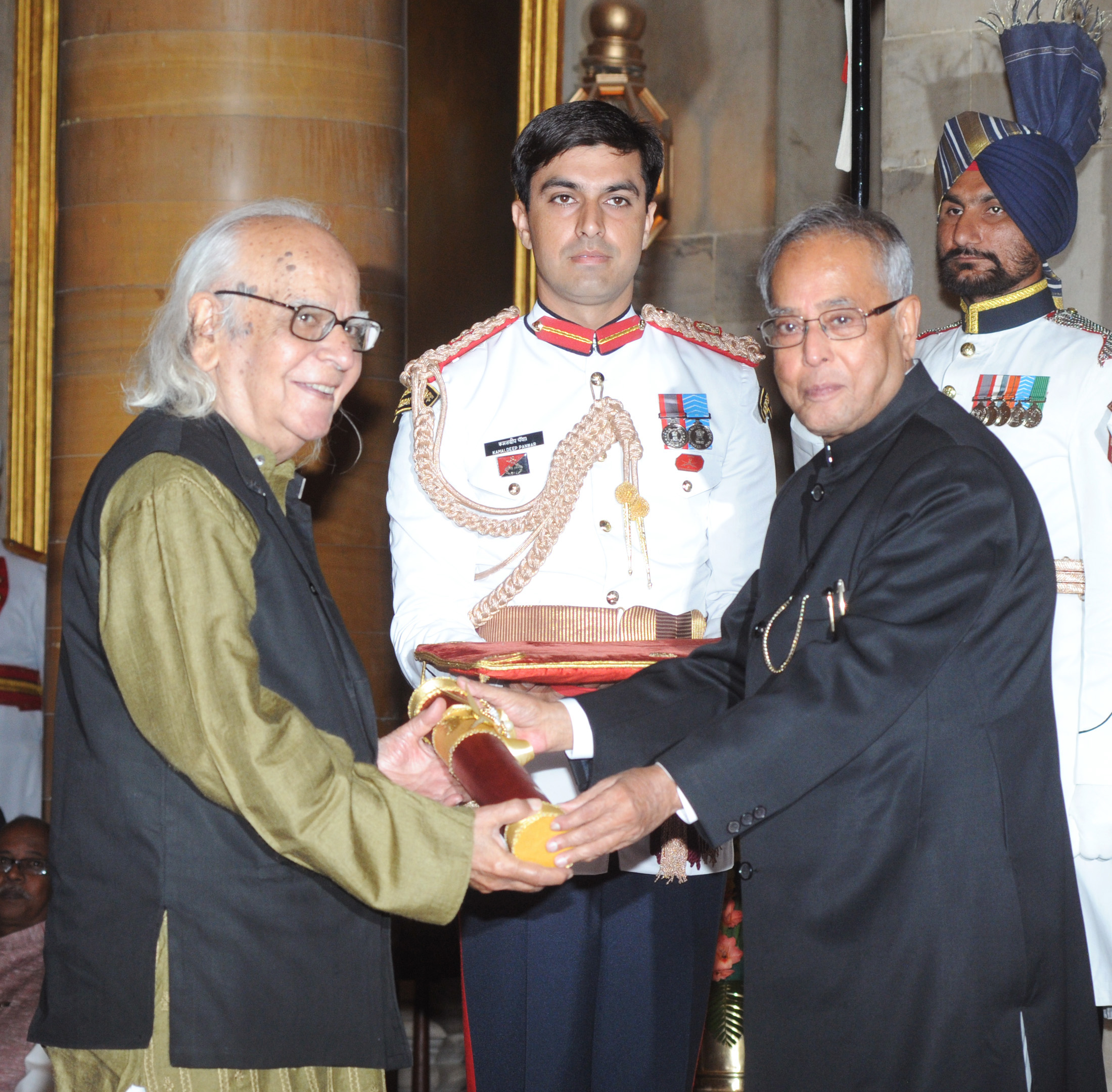
The President, Shri Pranab Mukherjee presenting the Padma Vibhushan Award to Prof. Yash Pal at the Investiture Ceremony at Rashtrapati Bhavan, in New Delhi on April 05, 2013

In 1976, the Indian government awarded Pal the Padma Bhushan for his contribution to science and space technology. A fellow of Indian National Science Academy, Pal was made a Marconi Fellow in 1980 for his work at the Space Applications Centre in Ahmedabad. In 2009, he received the Kalinga Prize, awarded by UNESCO for the popularisation of science. In October 2011 he was also awarded the Lal Bahadur Shastri National Award for excellence in public administration, academics and management.

He was the Chancellor of Jawaharlal Nehru University, New Delhi from March 2007 to March 2012.

Pal was honoured with the Padma Bhushan (1976) and the Padma Vibhushan (2013), the third and second highest Indian civilian honours.

Pal received the Indira Gandhi Prize for Popularization of Science (2000) and the Meghnad Saha Medal (2006) for his outstanding contribution to science.
