= Lal Bahadur Shastri National Award =

Indian annual business award

- Awarded for: Excellence in Public Administration, Academics and Management.
- Country: republic of India
- Presented by: Lal Bahadur Shastri Institute of Management
- First award: 1999
- Website: LBSIM official website

The Lal Bahadur Shastri National Award is an annual prestigious award instituted from Lal Bahadur Shastri Institute of Management, Delhi. This consists of a cash award of 5,00,000 rupees plus a citation and a plaque.

== Background ==
The award was started in 1999 and is provided to a business leader, management practitioner, public administrator, educator or institution builder for his/her sustained individual contributions for achievements of high professional order and excellence. This award is given by the President of India.

== Awardees ==
| Year | Awarded to |
|---|---|
| 2022 | Dr. Bakul Dholakia, Former Director IIM Ahmedabad |
| 2021 | Dr. Randeep Guleria, AIIMS Director |
| 2019 | Dr. Manju Sharma |
| 2018 | Fali S. Nariman, expert of constitution. |
| 2017 | Bindeshwar Pathak |
| 2016 | Shri Gopalkrishna Gandhi, a distinguished administrator, a diplomat and an author of repute" has been chosen for the prestigious Lal Bahadur Shastri National Award for Excellence in Public Administration, Academics and Management:2016 |
| 2015 | Prannoy Roy, co-founder of NDTV |
| 2014 | A. Sivathanu Pillai, for his contribution in developing BrahMos cruise missile. |
| 2013 | Dr. Rajendra Achyut Badwe -Director, Tata Memorial Centre and Professor &Head, Department of Surgical Oncology, Tata Memorial Hospital, Mumbai |
| 2012 | Smt. Tessy Thomas |
| 2011 | Prof. Yash Pal |
| 2010 | Smt. Aruna Roy |
| 2009 | Shri Sunil Bharti Mittal |
| 2008 | Dr. E. Sreedharan |
| 2007 | |
| 2006 | Dr. M. S. Swaminathan |
| 2005 | Dr.Naresh Trehan |
| 2004 | Dr. C.P. Srivastava |
| 2003 | Smt. Ela Ramesh Bhatt |
| 2002 | Dr. R.A. Mashelkar |
| 2001 | Mr. N.R. Narayana Murthy |
| 2000 | Mr. Sam Pitroda |
| 1999 | Prof. C.K. Prahalad |

=== Award gallery ===
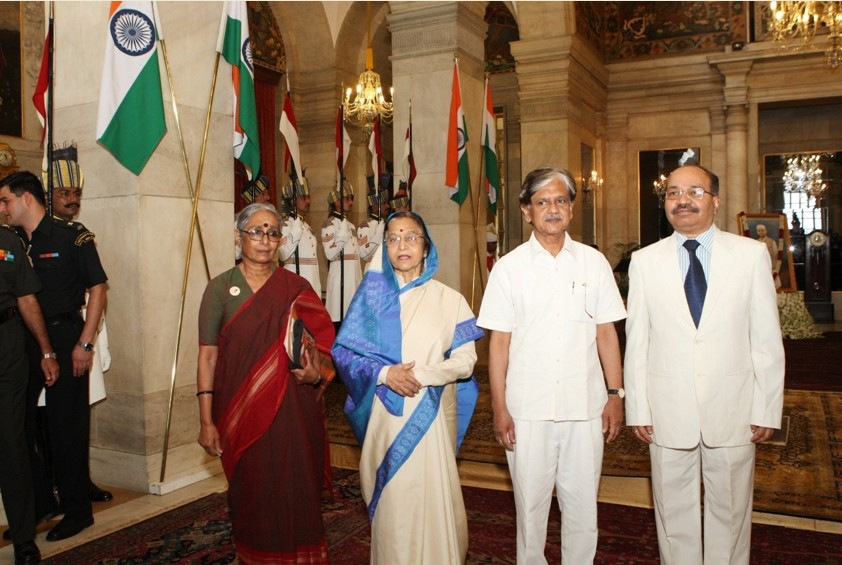
LBS National Award 2010
Smt. Aruna Roy

== See also ==
- Lal Bahadur Shastri Institute of Management
