= Integrated Disease Surveillance Programme =

Indian government epidemiological monitoring system

The Integrated Disease Surveillance Programme (IDSP) is a nationwide disease surveillance system in India incorporating both the state and central governments aimed at early detection and long term monitoring of diseases for enabling efficient policy decisions. It was started in 2004 with the assistance of the World Bank. A central surveillance unit has been set up at the National Centre for Disease Control in Delhi. All states, union territories, and district headquarters of India have established surveillance units. Weekly data is submitted from over 90% of the 741 districts in the country. With the aim of improving digital surveillance capabilities, the Integrated Health Information Platform (IHIP) was launched in a number of states in November 2019.

== Background ==
The IDSP was initiated by the World Bank in November 2004 to 2010 for the whole country and thereafter until 2012 for 9 identified priority states namely Uttarakhand, Rajasthan, Punjab, Maharashtra, Gujarat, Tamil Nadu, Karnataka, Andhra Pradesh and West Bengal. The remaining states were funded from India's domestic budget during 2010 to 2012. The programme continues during 12th Plan (2012–17) under National Health Mission with a budget of Rs. 64.04 Crore from domestic budget only.

Media scanning and verification cell (MSVC) was established under IDSP in July 2008 to improve Event-Based Surveillance and to catch unusual health events reported in the media. MSVC regularly monitors electronic & print media for these events.

The project was undertaken to meet the World Health Organization Guidelines for South East Asian countries on disease surveillance to track the outbreak of diseases and its potential transboundary threats. The International Health Regulations of 2005 lay down comprehensive guidelines on the role of an International Health Regulation (IHR) contact point in surveillance of disease outbreaks in the country. This information is to be shared during unexpected or unusual public health events. The IHR that came into force in 2007, places an obligation upon member states to report certain outbreak reports in order to track global disease trends through health surveillance.

In this case the term surveillance is not used in an intrusive manner, as understood otherwise. The IHR defines "Surveillance" as the systematic ongoing collection, collation and analysis of data for public health purposes and the timely dissemination of public health information for assessment and public health response as necessary.

== IDSP reporting ==
Surveillance Units have been set up in every state. Data from medical colleges, health centres, hospitals, labs, etc. is being utilized for the purpose of tracking and reporting of diseases. A Geographical Information System (GIS) is in use under this scheme.

The data is being collected on ‘S’ syndromic; ‘P’ probable; & ‘L’ laboratory formats using standard case definitions. The data collected also includes meteorological data, historical data, and remote sensing inputs.

Under IDSP data is collected on epidemic prone diseases on a weekly basis (Monday–Sunday) Whenever there is a rising trend of illnesses in any area, it is investigated by the Rapid Response Teams (RRT) to diagnose and control the outbreak.

During March 2014, about 90% districts have reported weekly disease surveillance data from districts. In 2015, the most number of outbreaks reports have been in the following states: West Bengal, Madhya Pradesh, Maharashtra and Karnataka and the top 4 diseases making up these alerts in the same year are Acute Diarrhea disease, food poisoning, measles, and dengue.

== Human resources & training ==
=== Human resources ===
One of the critical components for establishing an effective and responsive surveillance system is the availability of suitable health workforce which includes Epidemiologists, Microbiologists, Entomologists and Veterinarians, amongst others. It is widely acknowledged that in addressing the emerging health needs of the population, the health workforce is confronted by issues of shortages, skewed distribution, quality, accountability, weak capacity, work overload, inadequate growth opportunities and motivation. It is a growing challenge to maintain the needed numbers, quality, mix and distribution of workers to satisfy the healthcare needs of the entire population. Under IDSP, various initiatives were taken with implementation experiences and further major activities are underway and planned to address these issues.

=== Administrative Structure ===
==== Central Surveillance Unit ====
A senior officer from NCDC (Additional Director level) is designated as National Programme Officer (NPO), to coordinate the project activities under six sections namely Budget & Finance, Laboratory strengthening, Information Technology and Communication, Data Management and Monitoring, Human Resource Development and NCD Surveillance. This arrangement facilitated utilizing the services of Epidemiologists, Microbiologists and Statistical officers of NCDC to support the NPO in ensuring enhanced technical support, improved state oversight and troubleshooting.

During inception of the Integrated Disease Surveillance Project in 2004, the contractual positions sanctioned for CSU were Consultant (IT), Consultant (Procurement), Consultant (HR), Consultant (Finance), Accounts Officer, Data Manager, Data Processing Assistants, Data Entry Operators, Stenographer, Administrative Consultant and Class IV staff. In 2005 the World Bank recommended positioning regional coordinators for strengthening monitoring of project implementation by Phase-I States. Subsequently, six regional coordinators were placed in 2006 to support state units. During 2006–2007, the post of Consultant Training had been abolished and Training Manager post was created at CSU. In 2006–07, the Administrative unit shifted to NCDC and the Director of NCDC became the Project Director of IDSP.

A team from Centre for Disease Control & Prevention visited India for IDSP review during 7–17 September 2007. On the basis of the team's recommendations, other positions created at CSU during 2007-08 were those of Web Consultant (1), Statistician-cum-Programmer (1), Administrative Consultant (1), Data Entry Operator (1), Data processing Assistant (1) and Finance Consultant (1).

Subsequently, along with the expansion of the project in 2007–08, the need of technical support arose for ensuring timely and efficient implementation of the project. The Government of India took decision to recruit seven Epidemiologists and two Microbiologists for CSU to strengthen IDSP. During restructuring of the project in March 2010, Expenditure Finance Committee sanctioned the engagement of 13 additional contractual manpower at CSU on 28 February 2010. The positions sanctioned were Advisor Epidemiologist, Advisor Microbiologist, Management Expert, Documentation Officer, Communication Officer, and Consultant (IT) Team leader, Epidemiologists, Consultant (HR), Microbiologist and Media Scanning Assistant.

==== State and District Surveillance Units ====
The contractual positions initially sanctioned for SSU were Consultant (Training), Consultant (Finance & Procurement), Data Manager, Data Entry Operators, Office Assistant and Class IV staff. The contractual positions sanctioned for DSU were Data Manager, Data Entry Operator and Account/Administrative Assistant. Later on some of the posts were discontinued like Account/Administrative Assistant. In 2008 a total of 766 positions were sanctioned (Epidemiologists, Microbiologists, and Entomologist) to be appointed at state and district headquarters on contractual basis, to strengthen the capacity for implementation of IDSP. During restructuring and extension of project post March 2010, the positions of Accountant/Administrative Assistant at DSUs and Office Assistant at SSUs were discontinued. The position of a Veterinary Consultant has been approved for 12th FY Plan Period at SSU.

The HFM and Senior officers reviewed progress of the project several times and desired improvement. An important lacuna pointed out in all these reviews was the lack of adequate personnel in the State and District headquarters to ensure all units under IDSP report timely, report factually and the reports are analyzed for suitable action very promptly. The World Bank too, in its review, identified that the most critical bottlenecks for the programme included lack of dedicated staff for the project and very low capacity especially at district and block levels to analyze and use surveillance data for local decision and outbreak responses.

It was therefore, proposed that Epidemiologists, Microbiologists and Entomologists be appointed at State and District headquarters on contractual basis to strengthen the capacity for implementation of IDSP, so that the system is able to capture changes in disease pattern trend promptly. The 9th Empowered Programme Committee of the NRHM approved the proposal of contractual appointments of 766 positions at State/District levels on 3 January 2008. The 4th MSG NRHM meeting held on 4 August 2008 finally approved the proposal for contractual appointments of 766 health professionals (Epidemiologists, Microbiologists, and Entomologists) under IDSP.

Regarding the method of selection a meeting was held under the chairmanship of Joint Secretary (HFW) on 23 January 2008. MoU was signed with NHSRC for recruitment of contractual health professionals on 21 August 2008. These positions were advertised by NHSRC in National and Regional newspapers, and interviews for these posts were held from 17 November until 20 December 2008, at various locations including Hyderabad, Trivandrum, Guwahati, Mumbai, Lucknow, Chennai, Kolkata, Ahmedabad, Bangalore, Bhopal, Chandigarh, Patna, Jaipur and Delhi. Out of the 2,999 applications received, 1,394 candidates were short listed for interview. However, only 1,033 candidates appeared for the interviews at the aforesaid interview locations, of whom 599 candidates were selected

Consequently, NHSRC forwarded the list of 599 selected candidates (491 Epidemiologists, 85 Microbiologists and 23 Entomologists) to IDSP. After the approval of Secretary (HFW), the list was sent to the Principal Secretary (Health) of concerned States and SSO, IDSP through the Mission Director, NRHM for issuing contract letters to the selected candidates. Further, with restructuring and extension of IDSP by another two years up to March 2012, MOHFW concurred to the proposal of extension of contractual staff under IDSP employed at CSU, SSU and DSU beyond 31 March 2010.

In a major policy shift in May 2010, MoHFW authorized all State Health Societies for recruitment of these contractual professionals. States were also requested to extend the existing contractual engagement subject to their satisfactory performance. The ToRs/guidelines for contractual engagement for these posts were provided by CSU to the States/ UTs.

Total 417 epidemiologists, 126 Microbiologists, 8 Veterinary Consultants, 541 Data Managers, 17 consultant Trainings, 29 Consultant Finances and 25 Entomologists were recruited by States as in April 2016. The eligibility criteria and remuneration of human resources in the States/UTs are reviewed from time to time and necessary changes made as per the need of the hour.

== Types of training under IDSP ==
- TOT- Six days TOT programme is being designed for health personnel and members of rapid response team. Subjects covered in these training programmes are Introduction to surveillance with special reference to IDSP, basic epidemiology, collection and transmission of laboratory specimens and biosafety issues and details in response to outbreaks. A total of 2956 members of RRTs have been trained to date.
- FETP- It is a two-week-long training course designed to train DSOs/ Epidemiologists to enhance their epidemiological skills in outbreak investigations. Though FETP programmes, total 756 DSOs have been trained throughout the country until April 2016.
- Other types of training include Induction training of Microbiologists, Entomologists, finance consultant and other support staff under IDSP.

== Use of big data ==
Although the Indian Government does not identify this project as a big data one, there is vast potential to improve the mapping solutions with the help of using improved technology. The data collected under this scheme meets the criteria of the standard 3 V's to identify big data – Volume, Variety and Velocity of data. Usually a large number of cluster reports and isolated can help identify trends and patterns that will help track the spread of diseases with the help of syndromic surveillance data. A single portal under which data about such diseases can be traced, acts as a single information access point for all other health programmes in the country. While the disease outbreak reports help in timely response and action to mitigate damage, the scheme will also be instrumental in policy decisions and changes for the government.
