= Tata Memorial Centre =

Hospital in Maharashtra, India

Geography
- Location: Mumbai, Maharashtra, India
- Coordinates: 19.004861°N 72.843235°E

Organisation
- Type: Specialist
- Affiliated university: Homi Bhabha National Institute

Services
- Speciality: Oncology; Teaching hospital

History
- Founded: 28 February 1941; 85 years ago

Links
- Website: tmc.gov.in

The Tata Memorial Centre (TMC) is an autonomous institution under the administrative control of Department of Atomic Energy, Government of India. The TMC umbrella includes at least 10 cancer institutes across India, the largest and the central hub of which is the Tata Memorial Hospital (TMH) in Parel, Mumbai, is India's oldest and largest cancer institute.

It has spearheaded the Evidence-based Medicine (EBM) movement in oncology in India, and prioritizes Multidisciplinary Team (MDT) management through disease-specific groups, to ensure quality patient care.

There are many firsts to the TMC name. These include India's first linear accelerator for radiation therapy in 1978, bone marrow transplant in 1983, tissue bank in 1988, PET/CT in 2004, and the first proton therapy unit in a government setup (and second overall) in 2023. It has spearheaded the CAR-T cell trial which has led to the approval indigenous CAR-T cell therapy in India. Importantly, with a mission centered on comprehensive compassionate cancer care for all, approximately 60% of patients receive free or highly subsidized treatments. It is an autonomous institution under the administrative control of Department of Atomic Energy, Government of India. Its current Director is Dr. Sudeep Gupta.

== History and current scope ==
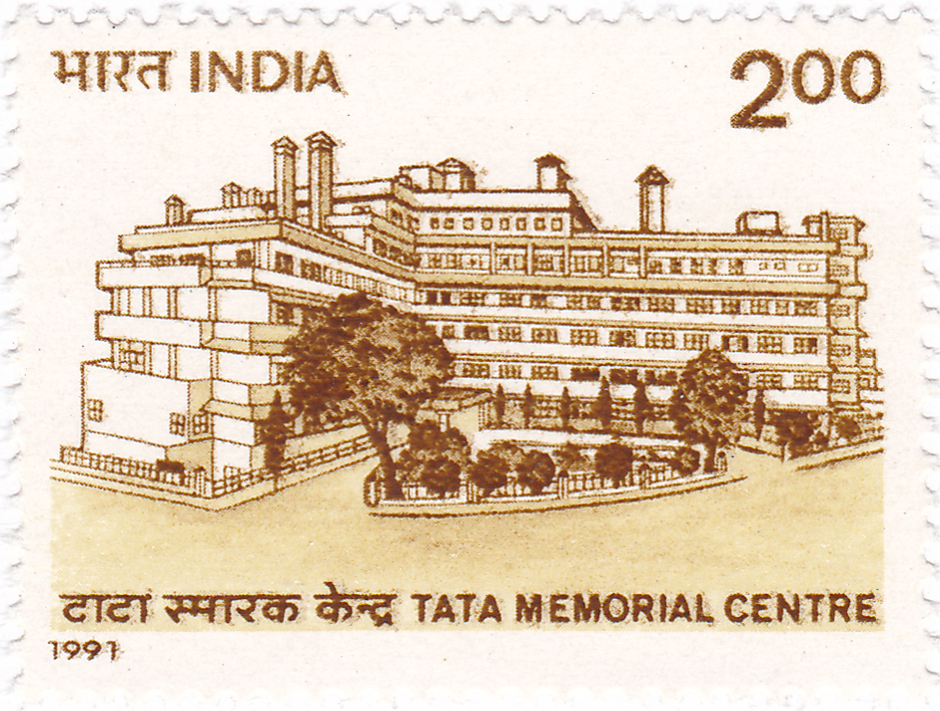
A 1991 stamp dedicated to the 50th anniversary of the Tata Memorial Centre

The Tata Memorial Hospital was initially commissioned by the Sir Dorabji Tata Trust on 28 February 1941 for the advancement of learning and research, disaster relief and other philanthropic activities ‘without any distinction of place, nationality or creed’. The death of Dorabji's wife Meherbai due to leukemia spurred him to create a center dedicated to researching the disease. In 1952, the Indian Cancer Research Centre was established as a research institute for basic research—later called the Cancer Research Institute (CRI). The Ministry of Health took over the Tata Memorial Hospital in 1957. Administrative control of both TMH and CRI was then transferred to the Department of Atomic Energy (DAE) in 1962, and these two arms merged to form the ‘Tata Memorial Center' (TMC) in 1966, with a mandate for service, education and research in cancer.

The Advanced Center for Treatment, Research and Education in Cancer (ACTREC) at Kharghar was inaugurated in 2002, and houses the CRI and the Clinical Research Center (CRC) (inaugurated in 2005), a state-of-the-art research hospital. It houses the Bone Marrow Transplant unit and the Proton Therapy Centre, amongst others, and has now expanded to a fully fledged clinical hospital.

TMC has expanded its outreach across the country with nodal centers established at multiple places across the country, following the ‘hub and spoke’ model. These together register about 120,000 new cancer patients every year. Currently (2024), TMC comprises the following centres:

- Tata Memorial Hospital, Parel, Mumbai
- ACTREC, Kharghar, Navi Mumbai
- Centre for Cancer Epidemiology (CCE), Kharghar, Navi Mumbai
- Homi Bhabha Cancer Hospital and Research Centre (HBCH&RC), Visakhapatnam, Andhra Pradesh
- Homi Bhabha Cancer Hospital (HBCH), Sangrur, Punjab
- Homi Bhabha Cancer Hospital and Research Centre (HBCH&RC), Mullanpur, Punjab
- Dr. Bhubaneswar Borooah Cancer Institute (BBCI), Guwahati, Assam
- Homi Bhabha Cancer Hospital (HBCH), Varanasi, Uttar Pradesh
- Mahamana Pandit Madan Mohan Malviya Cancer Centre (MPMMCC), Varanasi, Uttar Pradesh
- Homi Bhabha Cancer Hospital & Research Centre (HBCH & RC), Muzaffarpur, Bihar

== Patient care ==
TMC focuses on evidence-based cancer management. The patients have the option to choose between different payment classes - the 'general' and 'private' category, with the same set of doctors and the same infrastructure treating both. Extremely poor patients are treated at nominal cost ('NC' category). This cross-subsidization model has proven to be impactful, with over million patient footfalls and about 60,000 admissions happening annually from diverse regions. TMC focuses on multidisciplinary team (MDT) management by dedicated disease management groups for various cancers, with every new patient discussed in a tumor board consisting of surgical, medical and radiation oncologists, radiologists, pathologists and other relevant members of the team together as a group, to ensure that everyone is on the same page. TMC is equipped with facilities, including robotic surgery, proton therapy, 24-hour chemotherapy units, the latest diagnostic modalities (including 24-hour CT and MRI scanners), interventional and minimally-invasive treatment techniques, Bone Marrow Transplant, and CAR-T cell therapy. It also provides tele-consultation and second opinion services for patients. Its ethos and focus on patient care is best captured by the fact that cancer management continued even during the Covid lockdown period, during which almost 500 cancer patients were operated successfully.

Apart from cancer treatment, TMC also focuses on cancer prevention, screening and early detection. It has conducted large randomized controlled trials focusing on the efficacy of simple low cost and effective technologies for early detection of breast and cervical cancers among women. These include demonstrating the effectiveness of cervical cancer screening with visual inspection with acetic acid, and of breast cancer screening with clinical breast examination. This has led to development of pragmatic evidence-based guidelines that have strengthened national cancer control policies in India and have been adopted by other low and middle income countries (LMICs).

== National Cancer Grid (NCG) ==
The National Cancer Grid is a network of major cancer centers, research institutes, patient groups and charitable institutions across India with the mandate of establishing uniform standards of patient care for prevention, diagnosis, and treatment of cancer, providing specialized training and education in oncology and facilitating collaborative basic, translational and clinical research in cancer.

There are over 300 NCG centres across India and other countries. The resource-stratified NCG guidelines for cancer care are linked with Ayushman Bharat reimbursement. Other NCG initiatives include pooled procurement of oncology drugs with a median 82% saving compared to maximum retail price, virtual tumor boards, quality improvement initiatives, and the Koita Centre for Digital Oncology (KCDO).

== Education ==
The Tata Memorial Centre is a recognized training centre for cancer education and research by national and international organisations such as WHO, IAEA and UICC. Tata Memorial Hospital is a post-graduate teaching centre and is affiliated to the Homi Bhabha National University. Every year about 80 post-graduate students register with the centre for doing their Master's or Doctorate courses. There are about 400 students undergoing training every year in medical and non-medical fields in long and short term courses.

== See also ==
- Regional Cancer Centres
- Tata Medical Center
- Homi Bhabha Cancer Hospital and Research Centre, Muzaffarpur
