= National Institute of Biomedical Genomics =

Research institute of India

- Nickname: NIBMG
- Motto: Accelerating Genomics for Health
- Established: 23 February 2009; 17 years ago
- Laboratory type: Genome Research
- Research type: Autonomous Research Institute
- Field of research: Cancer; Infectious disease; Chronic disease; Computational Biology; Statistical Genomics
- Director: Sagar Sengupta
- Chairperson: Sudeep Gupta
- Location: Kalyani, West Bengal, India; 22°57′31.57″N 88°12′21.1″E
- Campus: Urban; 30 acres (12 ha)
- Funded by: Department of Biotechnology
- Affiliations: Regional Centre for Biotechnology
- Operating agency: Biotechnology Research and Innovation Council
- Website: www.nibmg.ac.in

National Institute of Biomedical Genomics (NIBMG) is a national level research institute for genomic medicine in India. It is located at Kalyani West Bengal—50 km from Kolkata. It has been established as an autonomous institution under the Department of Biotechnology, Government of India. This is the first institution in India explicitly devoted to research, training, translation, service, and capacity-building in biomedical genomics. The institute operates from a campus constructed on a 30-acre plot of land near Bidhanpally, Kalyani. The institute stands as a premier genomic facility, advancing precision medicine. Recently recognized as a key hub for detecting fetal anomalies and cancer, it leverages cutting-edge sequencing to revolutionize diagnostics and healthcare outcomes in India.

== Academics ==
The institute, stands as India's first institution explicitly dedicated to research, training, and capacity building in the field of biomedical genomics. As an autonomous institute under the Department of Biotechnology (DBT), it offers specialized academic programs designed to create a new generation of scientists capable of translating genomic insights into clinical solutions.

=== Post-Doctoral Fellowships ===
NIBMG offers prestigious post-doctoral positions for PhD holders to lead independent research projects or join established faculty laboratories. NIBMG Offer Fellowships occasionally, the institute invites applications for "NIBMG Fellows," which are high-tier positions for early-career scientists with an outstanding track record (often requiring 3+ years of post-doctoral experience). For Project-Linked Positions many post-doctoral opportunities are tied to specific extramural grants (e.g., from BIRAC or ICMR) focusing on areas like wastewater surveillance or single-cell multiomics.

=== PhD Programme ===
PhD program at NIBMG is designed for applicants who already hold a Master’s degree and are ready to commit to intensive, original research in biomedical genomics. Research Areas are Cancer Genomics for Understanding somatic alterations and tumor cell diversity, Infectious Disease Genomics for Studying susceptibility to diseases like COVID-19 or Tuberculosis, Computational Biology to Using AI and statistical models to analyze large-scale genomic data. Admission conducted twice a year (typically April and October). Admission is based on scores from national-level fellowships (CSIR-UGC NET, DBT-JRF, ICMR-JRF) followed by two rounds of interviews. Students receive fellowships as per Government of India (GoI) norms (JRF/SRF levels).

=== Integrated MS-PhD Programme ===
Launched in 2019, this is NIBMG’s flagship program for students who wish to transition directly from a Bachelor’s degree into high-level genomic research. The program follows a "2+N" year model. The first two years comprise the Master’s (MS) component, featuring rigorous coursework in biochemistry, biostatistics, human genetics, and computational biology. During the first two semesters, students undergo "lab rotations" across different research areas like cancer, infectious diseases, and chronic diseases to help them choose their PhD mentor. After four semesters, students must pass a comprehensive evaluation to "switch over" to the PhD track. Those who do not qualify or choose to leave may exit with an MS degree. For admission purpose applicants must have to qualify exams like JAM (Biotechnology) or JGEEBILS.

== See also ==
- Indian Institute of Science Education and Research, Kolkata
- Indian Statistical Institute
- Bose Institute
- Indian Institute of Chemical Biology
