= Sudeep Gupta =

Indian medical oncologist

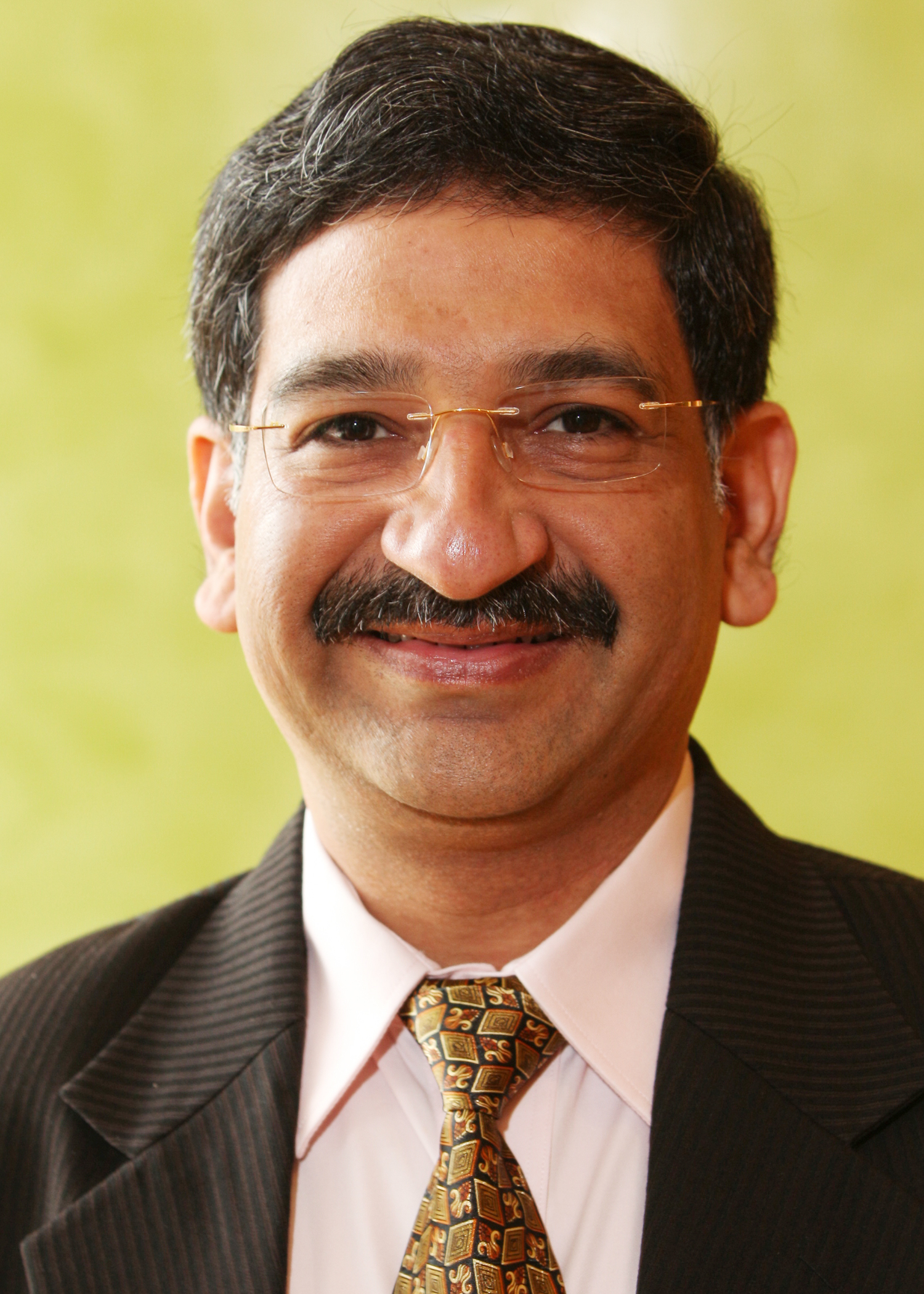
Dr Sudeep Gupta receiving a research grant

Dr Sudeep Gupta, born February 8, 1969, is an Indian medical doctor and medical oncologist, currently serving as the Director of the Tata Memorial Centre (TMC), a unit of the Department of Atomic Energy, Government of India. He succeeded Rajendra Achyut Badwe as the Director of Tata Memorial Centre, Mumbai, in 2023. An alumnus of India’s foremost medical institution, the All India Institute of Medical Sciences (AIIMS), New Delhi, he is recognized for his expertise in breast and gynaecological cancers. Dr Gupta has spearheaded transformative projects during his tenure (December 1, 2018, to November 30, 2023) as the Director of the Advanced Centre for Treatment, Research, and Education in Cancer (ACTREC), one of the institutions under TMC. These include the Proton Therapy Centre, the Women’s and Children’s Cancer Centre, and the Radiological Research Unit (one of the world’s largest therapeutic nuclear medicine facilities), which established ACTREC as a leading institution for cancer care. With over 350 peer-reviewed publications, his contributions to oncology research and cost-effective cancer treatment strategies have earned him national and international acclaim.

== Biography ==
Dr Gupta was born on February 8, 1969, in Moradabad, Uttar Pradesh, India, to a doctor couple who served as medical officers in the Indian Railways. He spent much of his childhood in Tundla, a semi-urban/rural location in Uttar Pradesh, where he studied in a convent school, the Christ The King School (now Christ The King Inter College). Eldest of four siblings, he demonstrated academic excellence from his childhood, standing first in his entire class in his 10th standard Indian Certificate of Secondary Education examination at the St Peters College, Agra and in the 12th Standard Central Board of Secondary Education examination at the Modern School (Barakhamba Road), New Delhi.

He was selected for the MBBS course at the All India Institute of Medical Sciences in 1986, which he completed in 1991. He went on to pursue and complete an MD in Internal Medicine in 1994 and a DM (Doctor of Medicine) in Medical Oncology in 2000 from AIIMS, New Delhi. His mother, herself a gynaecologist and an alumnus of the King George’s Medical College, Lucknow, developed advanced-stage ovarian cancer when Dr Gupta was in the final year of his medical school in 1990. She was treated at AIIMS, Delhi, went into remission, suffered a relapse when he was in the final year of MD Medicine and then suffered repeated exacerbations of the cancer, until she died in 1999 because of brain metastases. Dr Gupta was likely influenced by this personal experience in taking up oncology as his career.

== Career And Legacy ==
Dr. Sudeep Gupta joined the Tata Memorial Centre in 2001 as an Assistant Professor in the Department of Medical Oncology. He distinguished himself as an astute clinician and an accomplished teacher. He also developed an interest in clinical and translational research related to breast and gynaecological cancers, which are his core interests.He was noticed by the TMC leadership and considered for leadership positions. He was selected as the Deputy Director of ACTREC and then its Director in December 2018. Dr. Gupta has authored over 350 peer-reviewed publications and several book chapters. His notable works include a randomised controlled trial on cervical cancer treatment strategies, presented at the Plenary session of the European Society of Medical Oncology (ESMO) in 2017 and published in the Journal of Clinical Oncology. This study influenced global clinical practices for cervical cancer treatment. Another landmark study on using carboplatin for triple-negative breast cancer, presented at the San Antonio Breast Cancer Symposium in 2022, showcased his commitment to cost-effective therapies. His work often bridges the gap between clinical practice and laboratory research, particularly in tumour evolution and hypoxia. His work has impacted global clinical practices, emphasizing cost-effective interventions.

In November 2023, Dr. Gupta was appointed Director of the Tata Memorial Centre, furthering his vision for accessible, research-driven cancer care. He has emphasised the progressive adoption of the hub-and-spoke model of cancer care delivery in India to make cancer care accessible to all citizens.

Beyond his professional obligations, along with a cancer survivor, Mrs Devieka Bhojwani, he established the Women's Cancer Initiative, a non-governmental organization based in Tata Memorial Hospital, which offers financial and logistic assistance to women with breast and gynaecological cancers. He has also served as editor-in-chief of the Indian Journal of Medical and Paediatric Oncology and created Year in Review, a top-tier breast cancer conference every year in Mumbai and a website of the same name that archives major oncology conferences. Because of his work in cancer care and control, Dr Gupta has been conferred several prestigious orations at top conferences and by institutions.

Dr Sudeep Gupta's career includes leadership, research, and patient-centred care, while his dedication to education, advocacy, and community engagement.

== Positions held ==
- Director, Tata Memorial Centre (2023–Present)
- Director, Advanced Centre for Treatment, Research, and Education in Cancer (ACTREC) (2018–2023)
- Deputy Director, ACTREC (2013–2018)
- Faculty member in the Department of Medical Oncology, Tata Memorial Centre (2001–present)

== Selected papers ==
- Gupta, Sudeep; Maheshwari, Amita; Parab, Pallavi; Mahantshetty, Umesh; Hawaldar, Rohini; Sastri (Chopra), Supriya; Kerkar, Rajendra; Engineer, Reena; Tongaonkar, Hemant; Ghosh, Jaya; Gulia, Seema; Kumar, Neha; Shylasree, T. Surappa; Gawade, Renuka; Kembhavi, Yogesh; Gaikar, Madhuri; Menon, Santosh; Thakur, Meenakshi; Shrivastava, Shyam; Badwe, Rajendra (1 June 2018). "Neoadjuvant Chemotherapy Followed by Radical Surgery Versus Concomitant Chemotherapy and Radiotherapy in Patients With Stage IB2, IIA, or IIB Squamous Cervical Cancer: A Randomized Controlled Trial". Journal of Clinical Oncology. 36 (16): 1548–1555. doi:10.1200/JCO.2017.75.9985.
