= Evacuations related to the COVID-19 pandemic =

COVID-19 evacuation timeline

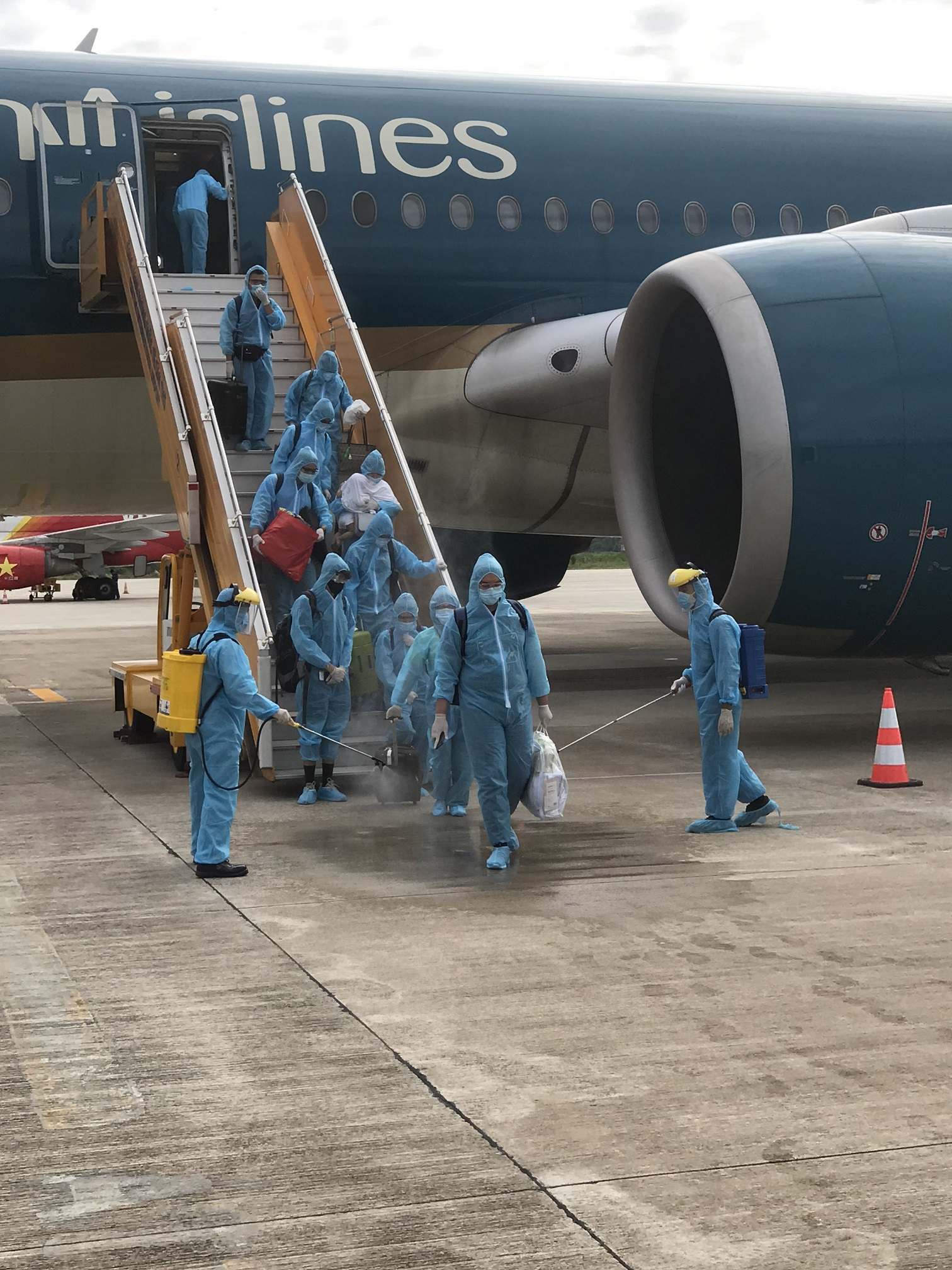
Citizens with hazmat suits, being sanitized after deboarding from a Vietnamese repatriation flight in August 2020.

This article lists major evacuations conducted by several countries as a result of the COVID-19 pandemic.

The SARS-CoV-2 virus was first identified in the city of Wuhan, Hubei, China in mid-December 2019, when a group of people developed a pneumonia without clear causes, and existing treatments were found to be ineffective. The novel coronavirus has similar characteristics to severe acute respiratory syndrome (SARS) and Middle East respiratory syndrome (MERS). Within a number of weeks, several thousand people in Hubei's provincial capital of Wuhan were infected, and the Chinese central government imposed strict containment measures, including a lockdown of Hubei itself.

Due to the effective lockdown of Wuhan and Hubei, and the continued growth of the outbreak in these locations, several countries planned to evacuate their citizens and/or diplomatic staff from the area. This was done primarily through chartered flights of the home nations, which were provided prior clearance by Chinese authorities. Australia, Belgium, France, Germany, India, Indonesia, Japan, the Philippines, Sri Lanka, Thailand, and the United States were among the first to plan the evacuation of their citizens. Pakistan has said that it will not be evacuating any citizens from China due to lack of domestic facilities to help treat Pakistanis who may be infected.

== International evacuations ==
=== Statistical overview ===
Organizing country/ies	Citizens evac.	Others evac.	Total evac.	As of	Ref.
India	–	–	4,582,000+ (Note: Includes Non-resident Indians (NRIs) and persons of Indian origin (PIOs). PIOs, are technically foreign citizens.)	2021-03-15	
Philippines	1,375,686	15+ (Note: At least 15 foreign citizens were evacuated. This figure was based on a 25 May flight which evacuated South Korean, Japanese, and American citizens.)	1,375,701+	2021-08-24	
European Union (Note: Only flights activated under and/or sponsored by the EU Civil Protection Mechanism.)	82,064	10,116	92,180	2020-09-10	
United States	–	–	108,972	2020-06-05	
Poland	47,500 (est.) (Note: As of 2 April 2020.)	800	54,000+	2020-04-05	

=== Military and organisation evacuations ===
The Peace Corps evacuated all volunteers, estimated at over 7,000 (Note: As of 30 September 2019, the Peace Corps had 7,334 members serving or being trained.) and suspended all volunteer programmes.

=== Major civilian evacuations ===
From 15 March to 15 April, the Polish flag carrier LOT flew over 54,000 people, including Poles and other nationals, under the "LOTDoDomu" (LOT Flight Home) programme.

The government of India plans to evacuate citizens from around the world through the "Vande Bharat Mission" in May. The first phase, with over 15,000 Indian citizens planned to be evacuated from 7 to 13 May, focuses mostly on the Gulf states and other areas with high concentrations of Indians such as the US and UK, while the second phase, starting 15 May, will shift efforts to other European and Central Asian countries. It has been predicted that this evacuation will surpass the 1990 airlift of Indians from Kuwait to be the biggest in the country's history, with estimates ranging as high as 192k-250k nationals to be brought home. As India closed its airspace to international flights in March, these flights are crucial for both citizens wanting to return to India as well as anyone who wants to leave the country via outbound flights.

=== List of international evacuations ===
Departure date	Organizing country/ies	Evacuees	Nationalities (Note: If all passengers were nationals of the country that organised the evacuation, no note is made.)	Departure airport	Arrival airport	Notes
2020-01-30 to 2020-03-17	Turkmenistan		(Turkmenistan)	Beijing, Moscow, Minsk, Istanbul	Turkmenabat Airport	Turkmenistan removed all its citizens from countries with coronavirus.
2020-01-24 to 27	Vietnam	200	(China) 200	Da Nang International Airport; Cam Ranh International Airport	(China) Wuhan Tianhe International Airport	Vietnam permitted four exceptional flights to take tourists and others from Wuhan home in the period 24–27 January, and organised a flight to evacuate citizens and diplomats.
2020-01-29	Australia; New Zealand	300 (est.)		(China) Wuhan Tianhe International Airport		On 26 January, ABC News's exclusive report showed over 100 Australian children were trapped in Wuhan as the Foreign Minister Marise Payne said diplomatic staff were making effort on evacuation plans. On 29 January, Australia and New Zealand announced that they would cooperate in the evacuation of their citizens from Wuhan. There are between 50 and 82 New Zealanders in Wuhan and 600 Australians in Hubei including 140 Australian children in Wuhan. The New Zealand Government chartered a Boeing 777-200ER aircraft from the national carrier Air New Zealand to assist in evacuation efforts, subject to approval from Chinese officials. While prioritising New Zealand nationals, Australian and Pacific Island citizens were also carried.
2020-01-29	United States	195		(China) Wuhan Tianhe International Airport	March Air Reserve Base	First US evacuation flight, with a fuel stop in Anchorage.
2020-01-29	Japan	206		(China) Wuhan Tianhe International Airport	Tokyo Haneda Airport	This was Japan's first evacuation flight. Three passengers later tested positive for the virus, with two of them becoming Japan's first asymptomatic cases.
2020-01-30	Japan	210		(China) Wuhan Tianhe International Airport	Tokyo Haneda Airport	This was Japan's second flight from Wuhan.
2020-01-30	Singapore	92		(China) Wuhan Tianhe International Airport	Singapore Changi Airport	Singaporeans were evacuated from Wuhan via a special Scoot flight, crewed by volunteers from the airline after co-ordination between Singapore and Chinese authorities facilitated the flights. However, not all Singaporeans were evacuated as some displayed symptoms before the flight. Two of the evacuees were later confirmed as the first Singaporeans to have the virus. Both were asymptomatic during the flight but were found to have a fever upon arrival.
2020-01-31	Japan	149		(China) Wuhan Tianhe International Airport	Tokyo Haneda Airport	Japan's third flight from Wuhan.
2020-01-31	Republic of Korea	368		(China) Wuhan Tianhe International Airport	(South Korea) Gimpo International Airport	
2020-01-31	United Kingdom	110	(United Kingdom) 83 (European Union) 27	(China) Wuhan Tianhe International Airport	Royal Air Force Brize Norton	Passengers left Wuhan with military medics from the UK, arriving at RAF Brize Norton in England. The British passengers were quarantined at a segregated block of Arrowe Park Hospital on the Wirral; all passengers were tested before and during the flight, with none having the virus. The other EU nationals were flown on to Spain from Brize Norton. More Britons (up to 150) were supposed to be on the flight, which was planned to leave a day earlier, but China initially declined permission, and then anyone who had a Chinese passport (including infants and a newborn to British parents) were told they could not leave. Shortly before the flight departed, this decision was reversed, but it was too late for people to get to the airport even though the plane was also delayed for several hours. The British government plans to send another plane if necessary.
2020-01-31	France	180		(China) Wuhan Tianhe International Airport	Istres-Le Tubé Air Base	
2020-01-31	China	76		(Thailand) Suvarnabhumi International Airport	Wuhan Tianhe International Airport	
2020-01-31	China	124		(Malaysia) Kota Kinabalu International Airport	Wuhan Tianhe International Airport	
2020-01-31	China	111		(Japan) Tokyo Haneda Airport	Wuhan Tianhe International Airport	
2020-01-31	Germany	124		(China) Wuhan Tianhe International Airport	Frankfurt Airport	The German Air Force plane was denied a stopover in Moscow after its starting point in Wuhan, according to the German Minister of Defence. Originally, the plane had received approval for a layover in Moscow to stop for refuelling and a change of crew personnel. The aircraft evacuated 102 German and 26 non-German citizens. The plane made a stopover in Helsinki on its way to Frankfurt Airport. The German Minister of Health stated that all passengers showed no symptoms of the coronavirus. On its way to Wuhan, the aeroplane carried 10,000 suits of protective equipment as requested by the Chinese government. Two passengers later tested positive for the virus.
2020-02-01	Republic of Korea	333		(China) Wuhan Tianhe International Airport	(South Korea) Gimpo International Airport	South Korea's second flight, operated by Korean Air.
2020-02-01	Sri Lanka	33		(China) Wuhan Tianhe International Airport	Mattala Rajapaksa International Airport	A special SriLankan Airlines plane flew from Wuhan after co-ordination between the Sri Lankan Government and Chinese authorities. After arrival all passengers were quarantined at a segregated block at Diyatalawa Garrison of the Sri Lanka Army.
2020-02-01	India	324		(China) Wuhan Tianhe International Airport	Indira Gandhi International Airport	This was India's first evacuation flight. There were three minors, 211 students and 110 working professionals, and the flight was operated by Air India.
2020-02-01	Turkey	42	(Turkey) 32 (Azerbaijan) 10	(China) Wuhan Tianhe International Airport	Ankara Esenboğa Airport	A cargo plane delivered medical equipment to China before taking the evacuees to Ankara. All passengers were quarantined in a local disused hospital.
2020-02-01	Jordan	71	(Jordan) 55 (Palestine) 7 (Oman) 3 (Tunisia) 3 (Bahrain) 1 (Lebanon) 1	(China) Wuhan Tianhe International Airport	Queen Alia International Airport	Flown by Royal Jordanian, making it the first Wuhan evacuation flight by a flag carrier.
2020-02-01	Mongolia	31		(China) Wuhan Tianhe International Airport	Chinggis Khaan International Airport	The flight was operated by MIAT Mongolian Airlines for the government. Passengers were quarantined at the National Center for Communicable Diseases.
2020-02-01	Myanmar	59		(China) Wuhan Tianhe International Airport	Mandalay International Airport	Myanmar National Airlines operated the flight.
2020-02-01	Bangladesh	312		(China) Wuhan Tianhe International Airport	Shahjalal International Airport	Using a chartered Boeing 777-300ER of Biman Bangladesh Airlines, the government evacuated many people in Wuhan, mostly students studying there. After arrival they were taken to hajj camp which was turned into quarantine near Dhaka airport for 14 days. 3 people who had high temperature was taken to CMH hospital.
2020-02-01	Morocco	167		(China) Wuhan Tianhe International Airport		Mostly students and staff of the country's embassy to China. Passengers were quarantined for 20 days instead of the standard 14.
2020-02-01	China	89		(Thailand) Phuket International Airport	Wuhan Tianhe International Airport	
2020-02-02	Indonesia	238		(China) Wuhan Tianhe International Airport	Hang Nadim International Airport	Government of Indonesia chartered a Batik Air aircraft with 18 crews and 30 medics to evacuate around 200 Indonesian citizens from Hubei Province. All passengers were then transferred to Raden Sadjad Air Force Base, in Ranai, Natuna Island using one Boeing 737 and two C-130 Hercules from Indonesian Air Force.
2020-02-02	India	330	(India) 323 (Maldives) 7	(China) Wuhan Tianhe International Airport	Indira Gandhi International Airport	This was India's second flight. All passengers were quarantined in Delhi and Manesar, Haryana.
2020-02-02	Algeria	46+	(Algeria) 36 (Tunisia) 10 (Libya) Unspecified number of students	(China) Wuhan Tianhe International Airport		Flown by Air Algérie. Also delivered supplies to China.
2020-02-02	Saudi Arabia	10		(China) Wuhan Tianhe International Airport	King Khalid International Airport	Mostly students, flight to Riyadh operated by Saudia.
2020-02-03	Italy	56	Italians and Poles	(China) Wuhan Tianhe International Airport	Pratica di Mare Air Base	Flown by a specially equipped KC-767.
2020-02-03	France	254		(China) Wuhan Tianhe International Airport	Istres-Le Tubé Air Base	The flight had 65 French nationals on board as well as residents of 29 other countries.
2020-02-03	Australia	243		(China) Wuhan Tianhe International Airport	Christmas Island Airport	Qantas flight chartered by the Australian government evacuated about 240 people, including 84 children and 5 infants, to the Australian mainland, before they were flown on smaller planes to the Christmas Island Detention Centre for quarantine. The inbound flight delivered medical supplies including masks, protective suits and gloves.
2020-02-03	Taiwan	247		(China) Wuhan Tianhe International Airport	Taoyuan International Airport	Charter flight operated by China Eastern Airlines
2020-02-04	Russia	144	(Russia) 128; 16 from post-Soviet states	(China) Wuhan Tianhe International Airport	Roshchino International Airport	Two military planes evacuated passengers to Tyumen, Siberia for quarantine.
2020-02-04	Malaysia	107		(China) Wuhan Tianhe International Airport	Kuala Lumpur International Airport	Chartered AirAsia flight with Malaysians as well as non-Malaysian family members on board.
2020-02-04	New Zealand	190	(New Zealand) 98 (Note: 54 New Zealand citizens and 44 Chinese New Zealand permanent residents) (Australia) 35 (Note: 23 Australian citizens and 12 Chinese Australian permanent residents) (Timor-Leste) 17 (Papua New Guinea) 17 (United Kingdom) 8 (Samoa) 5 (Tonga) 4 (Fiji) 2 (Kiribati) 1 (Federated States of Micronesia) 1 (Netherlands) 1 (Uzbekistan) 1	(China) Wuhan Tianhe International Airport	Auckland Airport	Aircraft operated by Air New Zealand NZ1942. Except for the Australian residents, who were subsequently sent to Australia, others were sent to Whangaparaoa military base, 25 km away from Auckland, for two weeks of quarantine.
2020-02-04	Thailand	144		(China) Wuhan Tianhe International Airport	U-Tapao International Airport	While the flight left from Don Mueang International Airport in Bangkok, it flew to a different airport in order for passengers to be quarantined at nearby Sattahip Naval Base.
2020-02-04	Iran	84		(China) Wuhan Tianhe International Airport	Imam Khomeini International Airport	59 Iranians, 24 Syrians and one Lebanese citizen were evacuated by a flight operated by Mahan Air.
2020-02-04	United States	350 (est.)		(China) Wuhan Tianhe International Airport	Travis Air Force Base; Marine Corps Air Station Miramar	There were two flights, one of which went to Travis AFB near San Francisco, and the other which refuelled there and continued to MCAS Miramar near San Diego. Passengers on both flights were quarantined for 14 days. On 10 February, one passenger was confirmed infected and became the 13th case in the United States.
2020-02-05	Russia	147		(China) Wuhan Tianhe International Airport	Roshchino International Airport	Two Russian Air Force Il-76TDs evacuated people who were taken to a quarantine base in Tumen rehabilitation center.
2020-02-06	Canada	176		(China) Wuhan Tianhe International Airport	Canadian Forces Base Trenton	The flight was operated by an Airbus A330 (registration number 9H-STY), stopped at Vancouver International Airport to refuel, and then flew to CFB Trenton near Toronto. Quarantine was lifted on 21 February and no one was infected.
2020-02-06	United States	300 (est.)	(United States) 240 (est.) (Canada) 60+	(China) Wuhan Tianhe International Airport	Plane 1 (Canada) Vancouver International Airport; Marine Corps Air Station Miramar; Plane 2 Lackland Air Force Base; Eppley Airfield	Consisted of two flights, one of which had a fuel stop in Vancouver were Canadians disembarked.
2020-02-07	Japan	198		(China) Wuhan Tianhe International Airport	Tokyo Haneda Airport	Fourth Japanese flight from Wuhan.
2020-02-07	Brazil	40	(Brazil) 34 (Poland) 4 (China) 1 (India) 1	(China) Wuhan Tianhe International Airport	(Poland) Warsaw (Brazil) Fortaleza	The Brazilian Air Force used two E-190 planes. One had a fuel stop in Las Palmas, where no one disembarked. All non-Brazilians got off in Warsaw.
2020-02-07	Brunei	2		(China) Wuhan Tianhe International Airport	Brunei International Airport	Operated by Royal Brunei Airlines and arrived the next day.
2020-02-08	China	61		Bali International Airport	Wuhan Tianhe International Airport	A flight chartered by the Chinese Consulate-General picked up 49 adults and 12 children from Bali to Wuhan.
2020-02-09	Philippines	30		(China) Wuhan Tianhe International Airport	Clark Air Base	
2020-02-09	Australia	258		(China) Wuhan Tianhe International Airport	Darwin International Airport	Operated by Qantas Airways, with a total of 266 people evacuated including 8 Pacific Islanders. Everyone was quarantined in an unused mining camp near Darwin.
2020-02-09	Singapore	174		(China) Wuhan Tianhe International Airport	Changi International Airport	SIngaporeans were flown home on another special Scoot flight, numbered TR5121. On 16 February, one passenger was diagnosed with the virus. On 21 February, another confirmed diagnosis was announced.
2020-02-09	United Kingdom	200	(United Kingdom) 105 (incl. family members); 95 others	(China) Wuhan Tianhe International Airport	Royal Air Force Brize Norton	Second British flight from Wuhan.
2020-02-10	France	35		(China) Wuhan Tianhe International Airport	Istres-Le Tubé Air Base	
2020-02-10	Canada	185		(China) Wuhan Tianhe International Airport	Canadian Forces Base Trenton	
2020-02-10	Vietnam	30		(China) Wuhan Tianhe International Airport	Noi Bai International Airport	Flight to Hanoi operated by Vietnam Airlines.
2020-02-11	South Korea	140		(China) Wuhan Tianhe International Airport	(South Korea) Gimpo International Airport	
2020-02-16	Nepal	175		(China) Wuhan Tianhe International Airport	Tribhuvan International Airport	The flight to Kathmandu was operated by Nepal Airlines. The original number of Nepalese to be evacuated was 185, however, 4 of them decided to stay back and 6 were barred to board the flight for medical reasons.
2020-02-17	Japan	65		(China) Wuhan Tianhe International Airport	Tokyo Haneda Airport	Fifth evacuation by Japan from Wuhan.
2020-02-17	United States	380+		(Japan) Tokyo Haneda Airport	Travis Air Force Base; Lackland Air Force Base; Eppley Airfield	Evacuated passengers on the Diamond Princess
2020-02-19	South Korea	7	(South Korea) 6 (Japan) 1 (spouse)	(Japan) Tokyo Haneda Airport	(South Korea) Gimpo International Airport	Air Force flight evacuating Diamond Princess passengers
2020-02-20	Hong Kong	106	84; 18 passengers of other nationalities, possibly Hong Kong residents	(Japan) Tokyo Haneda Airport	Hong Kong International Airport	First Hong Kong evacuation flight for Diamond Princess passengers.
2020-02-20	Australia	164		(Japan) Tokyo Haneda Airport	Darwin International Airport	Two passengers later tested positive.
2020-02-20	Ukraine	72	(Ukraine) 45 (Argentina) 8 (Dominican Republic) 5 (Ecuador) 5 (El Salvador) 4 (Kazakhstan) 2 (Costa Rica) 2 (Israel) 1 (Montenegro) 1 (Panama) 1	(China) Wuhan Tianhe International Airport	(Kazakhstan) Almaty International Airport; Kharkiv International Airport	Another 3 Ukrainian citizens and 1 foreign national were denied boarding the flight by Chinese authorities for medical reasons. Two Kazakhstan citizens have left the airliner during the intermediate landing in Almaty, Kazakhstan. All remaining evacuees were taken to Kharkiv Airport and then they were transported by ground to the National Guard sanatorium in Novi Sanzhary for 14 days quarantine.
2020-02-21	France	64	(France) 28; 36 others	(China) Wuhan Tianhe International Airport	Paris（Airport unknown）	All passengers were quarantined in Normandy.
2020-02-21	Canada	200+		(Japan) Tokyo Haneda Airport	Canadian Forces Base Trenton	Flight for Diamond Princess passengers. After landing in Canada, passengers were held in quarantine in an hotel.
2020-02-21	Taiwan	19		(Japan) Tokyo Haneda Airport	Taoyuan International Airport	Evacuated Diamond Princess passengers.
2020-02-21	Hong Kong	84	(Hong Kong) 82 (Macau) 2	(Japan) Tokyo Haneda Airport	Hong Kong International Airport	Second Hong Kong flight for Diamond Princess passengers. Macaunese passengers were taken to their homes by land over the Hong Kong-Zhuhai-Macau bridge.
2020-02-22	United Kingdom	32	(United Kingdom) 30 (Republic of Ireland) 2	(Japan) Tokyo Haneda Airport		Special plane for Diamond Princess passengers.
2020-02-23	Hong Kong	5 (excluding government workers)		(Japan) Tokyo Haneda Airport	Hong Kong International Airport	Third evacuation flight by Hong Kong for Diamond Princess passengers.
2020-02-24	Taiwan	2		(China) Chengdu Shuangliu International Airport	Taoyuan International Airport	Evacuated a haemophiliac and his mother.
2020-02-25	Philippines	309		(Japan) Tokyo Haneda Airport	Clark Air Base	Repatriates consist of 440 crew members and 5 tourists from the Diamond Princess. The 445 Filipino repatriates were evacuated on two separate flights.
2020-02-25	Philippines	136		(Japan) Tokyo Haneda Airport	Clark Air Base	Repatriates consist of 440 crew members and 5 tourists from the Diamond Princess. The 445 Filipino repatriates were evacuated on two separate flights.
2020-02-26	Malaysia	66		(China) Wuhan Tianhe International Airport	Kuala Lumpur International Airport	Second Malaysian flight from Wuhan, operated by AirAsia.
2020-02-27	India	111	(India) 76 (Bangladesh) 23 (China) 6 (Myanmar) 2 (Maldives) 2 (South Africa) 1 (United States) 1 (Madagascar) 1	(China) Wuhan Tianhe International Airport	Indira Gandhi International Airport	This was the third evacuation flight sent by India to Wuhan. India also provided 15 tonnes of medical assistance comprising masks, gloves and other emergency medical equipment to China through the same Indian Air Force flight.
2020-02-27	India	124	(India) 119 (Sri Lanka) 2 (Nepal) 1 (South Africa) 1 (Peru) 1	(Japan) Tokyo（Airport unknown）	Indira Gandhi International Airport	This flight mostly had crew members of the Diamond Princess as passengers.
2020-02-27	Colombia	23	(Colombia) 15 (Spain) 5 (Mexico) 3	(China) Wuhan Tianhe International Airport	Military Transport Air Command	The flight was operated by the Colombian Air Force. Upon arrival, they were quarantined at a sports villa in Bogotá.
2020-03-02	Turkey	11		Istanbul Airport	(Taiwan) Taoyuan International Airport	After an Israeli passenger on another Turkish Airlines flight tested positive, the airline ran a special flight to take a Taiwanese tour group on the same flight as the confirmed case home.
2020-03-04	United Arab Emirates	215	(Yemen) 58; Unknown number of nationals from nearby countries	(China) Wuhan Tianhe International Airport	Dubai International Airport	
2020-03-04, 05	China	311/309		(Iran) Imam Khomeini International Airport	Lanzhou Zhongchuan International Airport	Two flights, with the first one being operated by China Southern Airlines, evacuated Chinese citizens to the western city. A cluster of cases in Gansu, where Lanzhou is located, were linked to the evacuation.
2020-03-04, 05	Hong Kong	533		(China) Wuhan Tianhe International Airport	Hong Kong International Airport	The Hong Kong government arranged four charter flights to bring back 533 of its residents from Wuhan. Upon arrival, they were quarantined in Chun Yeung Estate in Fo Tan.
2020-03-07	Macau	57		(China) Wuhan Tianhe International Airport	Macau International Airport	
2020-03-07	Philippines	167		Macau International Airport	Ninoy Aquino International Airport	Charter flight organised to bring Overseas Filipino Workers home.
2020-03-10	India	58		(Iran) Tehran（Airport unknown）	Hindon Airport	The Indian Air Force used a C-17 Globemaster transport aircraft to evacuate Indian pilgrims from Iran.
2020-03-10, 11	Taiwan	361		(China) Wuhan Tianhe International Airport	Taoyuan International Airport	After some conflict between the Chinese and Taiwanese governments, two flights, one operated by China Airlines with 169 evacuees and another by China Eastern Airlines carrying 192, arrived around 11 pm on 10 March and 4 am on the 11th respectively.
2020-03-11	China	164		(Iran) Imam Khomeini International Airport	Chengdu Shuangliu International Airport	
2020-03-11	India	83	(India) 74 (Italy) 6 (United States) 3	(Italy) Milan Malpensa Airport	Indira Gandhi International Airport	The flight was operated by Air India. All the non-Indian citizens were of Indian origin. All evacuees were placed under quarantine for 14 days.
2020-03-13	South Africa	114		(China) Wuhan Tianhe International Airport	Polokwane International Airport	112 South African citizens were evacuated on a South African Airways aircraft chartered by the South African Government. Medical screening was performed prior to departure, four South Africans who were showing signs of coronavirus were left behind to mitigate risk. Only South Africans who tested negative were repatriated. Test results cleared all the South Africans, including the flight crew, pilots, hotel staff, police and soldiers who, as a precautionary measure, all remained under observation and in quarantine for a 14-day period at The Ranch Resort.
2020-03-14	Thailand	89		(Italy) Leonardo da Vinci–Fiumicino Airport	U-Tapao International Airport	89 Thai students and tourist were evacuated from Italy on a Thai Airways flight organised by Thai government. They were quarantined for 14 days in Sattahip Naval Base.
2020-03-15	India	218		(Italy) Milan Malpensa Airport	Indira Gandhi International Airport	Air India operated the flight. The evacuees brought to New Delhi will be shifted to Indo-Tibetan Border Police's camp in Chhawla area where they will be quarantined for 14 days.
2020-03-15	India	234		(Iran) （Airport unknown）	Chhatrapati Shivaji International Airport	131 students and 103 pilgrims, among others, were evacuated from Iran on a Mahan Air flight organised by the Indian Embassy. They were quarantined for 14 days in Indian Army's wellness centre facility in Jaisalmer.
2020-03-16	India	53		(Iran) Tehran and Shiraz（Airport unknown）	Jaisalmer Airport	52 students and 1 teacher were evacuated by Air India and were then quarantined at an Army Wellness Centre in Jaisalmer.
2020-03-18	Malaysia	96		(India) New Delhi, Chennai and Mumbai （Airport unknown）	Kuala Lumpur International Airport	First batch of few hundred Malaysians stranded in India by an AirAsia flight.
2020-03-19	Republic of Korea	80	(South Korea) 74 (Iran) 6 (family members of SK nationals)	(Iran) Tehran Imam Khomeini International Airport	(South Korea) Incheon International Airport	An Iran Air charter flight took the passengers from Tehran to Dubai's Al Maktoum International Airport, where they transferred to an Asiana Airlines charter flight going to Incheon.
2020-03-19	Taiwan	72		(Peru) Lima International Airport	(United States) Miami International Airport	A group of 72 Taiwanese tourists flew from Lima to Miami on a privately chartered jet arranged by the Taiwanese government, after Peru declared a state of emergency due to the COVID-19 coronavirus outbreak and closed its borders on 16 March to all commercial traffic.
2020-03-22	Canada	444		(Morocco) Casablanca Mohammed V International Airport	(Canada) Montréal-Pierre Elliott Trudeau International Airport	An Air Canada Charted flight brought 444 Canadians from Casablanca to Montréal.
2020-03-23	Israel	250+		(Italy) Rome and Milan（Airport unknown）	Ben Gurion Airport	Israir operated two flights from Italy to Tel Aviv, with mostly students on board.
2020-03-24, 25	Canada	402		(Peru) Lima International Airport	(Canada) Toronto Pearson International Airport	An Air Canada Charted flight brought 402 Canadians from Lima to Peru.
2020-03-25	United States	1000+		(Peru) Lima International Airport	(United States) Atlanta International Airport	On 25 March, the US government has repatriated over 1000 Americans from Peru.
2020-03-25	United States			(Liberia) Monrovia Roberts International Airport	(United States) Washington Dulles International Airport	A chartered medical flight with limited capacity that gave preference to the elderly flew from Monrovia to Washington DC.
2020-03-25	Hong Kong	500+		(China) Wuhan Tianhe International Airport	Hong Kong International Airport	A total of four flights will be chartered by the government to vacate citizens living in Hubei province outside of Wuhan city.
2020-03-25	Brazil	66		(Peru) Cusco International Airport	(Brazil) Porto Velho Air Force Base	The two Hércules C-130 planes, of the Brazilian Air Force, carried out the rescue of 66 Brazilians who were stranded in Cuzco, Peru.
2020-03-25, 26, 30, 31	United Kingdom	1160+	160 (Republic of Ireland) (European Union); 4 (Hong Kong) (dual citizenship with British National Overseas Passport)	(Peru) Lima International Airport; Arequipa International Airport; Cusco International Airport; Pucallpa International Airport	(United Kingdom) London Heathrow International Airport	The UK government has arranged 7 British Airways charted flights to bring back over 1160 British, Irish and EU Nationals from Lima to London.
2020-03-26	Israel	314+		(India) New Delhi	Ben Gurion Airport	Air India operated a flight from New Delhi, India to Tel Aviv.
2020-03-26	South Korea	198		(Peru) Lima International Airport	(South Korea) Incheon International Airport	An Aeroméxico Charted flight brought 198 Korean from Lima to Incheon.
2020-03-27	Canada	432		(Morocco) Casablanca Mohammed V International Airport	(Canada) Montréal-Pierre Elliott Trudeau International Airport	An Air Canada Charted flight brought 432 Canadians from Casablanca to Montréal.
2020-03-29	United States	153		(Colombia) Bogota El Dorado International Airport	(United States) Atlanta International Airport	The U.S. Embassy, in conjunction with the U.S. Department of Homeland Security, organised an evacuation flight for U.S. citizens from El Dorado Airport in Bogota to Atlanta.
2020-03-29	Taiwan	139	(Taiwan) 55 (Japan) 29 (United States) 34 (Singapore) 14 (Malaysia) 7	(Peru) Cusco International Airport; Lima International Airport	(United States) Miami International Airport	The flight, chartered by LATAM Airlines, departed from Cusco, a southeastern city in Peru, with 38 Taiwanese on board, then flew to the capital, Lima, to pick up an additional 17 Taiwanese Nationals. Another 84 passengers of four different nationalities—Japan, Singapore, Malaysia, and the U.S. – bringing the total number of passengers to 139. The flight landed in Miami and all the passengers can choose to stay in the city or bound to their own country.
2020-03-30	Taiwan			(China) Shanghai Pudong International Airport	(Taiwan) Taoyuan International Airport	Two flights operated by China Airlines between Taoyuan and Shanghai will be opened to transport Taiwanese nationals in Hubei Province home.
2020-03-31	Australia	260		(Peru) Lima International Airport	(Australia) Sydney Airport	A group of about 260 Australians who paid at least $5,160 each for an evacuation flight out of Peru have returned home.
2020-03-31	Republic of Korea	309		(Italy) Milan Malpensa Airport	(South Korea) Incheon International Airport	A Korean Air Charted flight brought 309 Korean from Milan to Incheon.
2020-04-01	United States			(Colombia) Bogota El Dorado International Airport	(United States) Eglin Air Force Base	The U.S. Embassy, in conjunction with the U.S. Department of Defense, has organised an evacuation flight for U.S. citizens from El Dorado Airport in Bogota to Eglin Air Force Base in Destin, FL.
2020-04-01	United States	300		(Liberia) Monrovia Roberts International Airport	(United States) Washington Dulles International Airport	The Embassy of the United States in Liberia has announced the arrival of a second charted flight to evacuate its citizens from Liberia though the country has reported only three confirmed cases of Covid-19.
2020-04-01	Switzerland	203	(Switzerland) (Norway) (United Kingdom) (United States) (Canada) (European Union) (Hong Kong) (dual citizenship with British National Overseas Passport)	(Myanmar) Yangon International Airport	(Switzerland) Zurich Airport	An Edelweiss Air Charted flight brought 203 Swiss, British, Norwegian, EU, American and Canadian nationals from Yangon to Zurich. The first direct flight from Myanmar to Europe.
2020-04-01	Republic of Korea	205		(Italy) Leonardo da Vinci–Fiumicino Airport (Italy) Milan Malpensa Airport	(South Korea) Incheon International Airport	A Korean Air Charted flight brought 205 Korean from Rome and Milan to Incheon.
2020-04-02	United States			(Colombia) Bogota El Dorado International Airport	(United States) Fort Lauderdale–Hollywood International Airport	The U.S. Embassy announced that Spirit Airlines will operate a humanitarian flight from Bogota, Colombia on 2 April 2020. The flight will depart from El Dorado International Airport and arrive at Fort Lauderdale – Hollywood International Airport in Fort Lauderdale, Florida.
2020-04-03	Hong Kong	76	(Hong Kong) 65 (Malaysia) 6 (United Kingdom) 5	(Peru) Cusco International Airport; Lima International Airport	(United Kingdom) London Heathrow International Airport	The Hong Kong Government has arranged a charted flight to bring 65 Hong Kongers, 6 Malaysians and 5 Britons from Lima to London, then the Hong Kongers will go on board a regular connecting flight with secured bookings from London to Hong Kong. For those Hong Kongers and Malaysians who are stranded in Cusco, they will also take a domestic charted flight arranged by the Hong Kong government flying to Lima.
2020-04-18	Taiwan	60		(United Arab Emirates) Dubai International Airport	Taiwan Taoyuan International Airport	The Taiwanese government organised an Emirates charter flight taking 60 Taiwanese nationals back from UAE to Taiwan.
2020-04-21	Brazil	368		Hanoi–Noi Bai International Airport Bangkok–Suvarnabhumi Airport Medan–Kuala Namu International Airport	São Paulo–Guarulhos International Airport	A Garuda Indonesia plane chartered by Brazilian Ministry of Foreign Affairs repatriated a total of 368 Brazilians from Vietnam, Thailand, and Indonesia to São Paulo with stopover in Amsterdam. The flight was planned to depart on 16 April but later rescheduled after Qatari government denied the flight to make stopover in Qatar.
2020-04-28	Ukraine	259		(United States) Miami International Airport	(Ukraine) Kyiv International Airport	
2020-04-30	Hong Kong	319		(Pakistan) Islamabad International Airport	Hong Kong International Airport	The very first flight to take back Hong Kongers from Pakistan after the nationwide lockdown. An estimated number of 2000 Hong Kong citizens are stranded in different parts of the country.
2020-04-30	Fiji			(Australia) Melbourne International Airport	(Fiji) Nadi International Airport	All guests are advised that only Fiji citizens (Fijian passport holders) are able to enter Fiji at this time. As with all recent evacuation flights arrivals, all arriving guests will be required to go into self-isolation at a Fijian Government-mandated facility for 28 days.
2020-05-18	Hong Kong	249		(India) Indira Gandhi International Airport	Hong Kong International Airport	The very first flight to take back Hong Kongers from India after the nationwide lockdown. An estimated number of 3500 Hong Kong citizens are stranded in different parts of the country.

== Large-scale domestic evacuations ==
=== France ===
The French government has strategically moved coronavirus patients from harder-hit areas to those with less cases to spread out the strain on the hospital system. Evacuations done for this purpose include one from Corsica using a naval ship and a series of high-speed TGV trains from Grand-Est to other regions.

=== India ===
Throughout the COVID-19 pandemic in India, the country's central and state governments coordinated numerous international and domestic evacuations. The Indian government initiated a massive evacuation program called "Vande Bharat Mission" on 7 May 2020. This involved flights via Air India and its low-cost arm Air India Express. In the first three phases of the mission, the government did not allow private airlines to participate, though they have been allowed to participate in the fourth phase onwards. The government continues to set the fare, determine the routes and decide the number of flights.

Over 67,000 evacuation requests were registered by MEA by 8 May 2020; twenty days later, the number of registrations had increased to over 300,000. It was initially predicted that the total number of civilians evacuated could surpass the Kuwait airlift, with estimates ranging from 192,000 to 250,000. On 6 August, the MEA declared that almost 950,000 Indians were repatriated.

=== Philippines ===
The national and local governments of Philippines have established and facilitated a program to evacuate its citizens and local migrant workers from COVID-19 hit regions to their home provinces.

== Controversies and issues ==
=== Quarantine locations ===
Australian Prime Minister Scott Morrison announced plans in late January 2020 to quarantine Australian citizens evacuated from Wuhan, including children and the elderly, for a period of 14 days on Christmas Island. The decision to repatriate those citizens using controversial detention facilities formerly used to detain asylum seekers before they were shut down in 2018 has received criticism. Controversially, the government plan also necessitates those evacuees to pay a fee of A$1,000, and would take them to Perth after the quarantine period, where they would need to arrange their own transportation back to their home cities. The Australian Medical Association, in a statement on the same day, stated that the decision to hold Australian citizens in "a place where has been previously the focus of populations under enormous mental and physical trauma and anguish, is not a really appropriate solution."

In some places, local residents rallied against the decision to quarantine evacuees in their region. Residents of Nautana protested against the Indonesian government in early February 2020 for letting the evacuees stay there. Hundreds staged demonstrations and burned tires. As a result, Brimob and Indonesian National Armed Forces troops were deployed to ensure stable security conditions. To protect and give health assurance to local people, President Joko Widodo ordered Health Minister Terawan Agus Putranto to open a temporary office in Natuna.

In the Philippines, the usage of the New Clark City development as a quarantine site was met with opposition from the municipal council of Capas. The local legislative said that they were not consulted by the national Department of Health and the Bases Conversion and Development Authority regarding the plan and suggested the national government to consider a more isolated area as a quarantine site.

After healthy Ukrainian evacuees returned from Wuhan to Ukraine on 20 February 2020, misinformation caused riots as protestors railed against the decision to quarantine the passengers nearby the day after they flew back, and the evacuees' bus was attacked.

=== Fees and payment responsibility ===
Due to the nature of evacuation flights, being flown empty one-way and being arranged by charter airlines in many cases at short notice, many passengers have had to pay substantial fees for a seat. Notably, the U.S. Department of State couldn't show that the prices it charged passengers for some chartered flights complied with its fare policy because it didn't have written guidance for calculating and documenting actual costs. In the United States, a bill was introduced in Congress to propose waiving travel expenses for US citizens evacuated. and in Nigeria, flights have been subsidised by the government. Indian migrant workers also suffered with high prices, which were compounded by their lack of income due to the lockdown and economic downturn. In response, the Jharkhand government and Congress Party branch said it would pay train fares for migrants leaving the state as well as organise special trains for residents to get to their hometowns.

=== Improper procedures ===
In the United States, a Department of Health and Human Services employee claimed that the workers who received Americans from the first evacuation from Wuhan were inadequately trained and equipped.
