= Fo Tan (constituency) =

Hong Kong constituency

- Elected constituency for the Sha Tin District Council
- Boundary of Fo Tan in Sha Tin District
- District: Sha Tin
- Legislative Council constituency: New Territories North East
- Population: 20,520 (2019)
- Electorate: 8,719 (2019)

Current constituency
- Created: 1982 (first time); 1991 (second time)
- Number of members: One
- Member: Vacant

Fo Tan is one of the 36 constituencies in the Sha Tin District in Hong Kong.

The constituency returns one district councillor to the Sha Tin District Council, with an election every four years. The seat has been currently held by independent Scarlett Pong.

Fo Tan constituency is loosely based on area of Fo Tan with an estimated population of 16,982.

== Councillors represented ==
=== 1982 to 1985 ===
Election	Member	Party	Member	Party
1982	Lam Hung-chiu	Independent	Hung Yuk-fai	Independent
1985	Constituency abolished			

=== 1991 to present ===
Election	Member	Party
1991	Thomas Pang Cheung-wai	Independent
1994	Thomas Pang Cheung-wai	DAB
1999	Porinda Liu Huan-yee	Civil Force
2003	Richard Tsoi Yiu-cheong	CTU
2007	Scarlett Pong Oi-lan	Independent (NCF)
2012	Scarlett Pong Oi-lan	Civil Force (NCF)
201?	Scarlett Pong Oi-lan	Independent (NCF)
2019	Lui Kai-wing→Vacant	Civic→Independent

== Election results ==
=== 2010s ===
Sha Tin District Council Election, 2019: Fo Tan
Party	Candidate	Votes	%	±%
Civic	Lui Kai-wing	3,550	56.65	+18.45
Nonpartisan	Scarlett Pong Oi-lan	2,716	43.35	−18.45
Majority		834	13.30	
Turnout		6,282	72.06	
Civic gain from Nonpartisan		Swing		

Sha Tin District Council Election, 2015: Fo Tan
Party	Candidate	Votes	%	±%
Nonpartisan	Scarlett Pong Oi-lan	1,905	61.8	–4.9
Civic	Chan Man-fai	1,250	38.2	
Majority		655	23.6	
Turnout		3,192	42.4	
Independent hold		Swing		

Sha Tin District Council Election, 2011: Fo Tan
Party	Candidate	Votes	%	±%
Independent	Scarlett Pong Oi-lan	1,640	66.7	+17.3
Citizens' Radio	Chan Tak-cheung	522	21.2	
Independent	Porinda Liu Huan-yee	295	12.0	
Independent hold		Swing		

=== 2000s ===
Sha Tin District Council Election, 2007: Fo Tan
Party	Candidate	Votes	%	±%
Independent	Scarlett Pong Oi-lan	1,346	49.4	
Independent	Richard Tsoi Yiu-cheong	1,160	42.6	−24.7
Independent	Wong Mei-ngan	216	7.9	
Independent gain from Independent		Swing		

Sha Tin District Council Election, 2003: Fo Tan
Party	Candidate	Votes	%	±%
CTU	Richard Tsoi Yiu-cheong	1,280	67.3	
Independent	Porinda Liu Huan-yee	622	32.7	−17.8
CTU gain from Independent		Swing		

=== 1990s ===
Sha Tin District Council Election, 1999: Fo Tan
Party	Candidate	Votes	%	±%
Civil Force	Porinda Liu Huan-yee	753	50.5	
Independent	Lee Ho-fai	727	48.7	
Civil Force gain from DAB		Swing		

Sha Tin District Council Election, 1994: Fo Tan
Party	Candidate	Votes	%	±%
Independent	Thomas Pang Cheung-wai	uncontested		
Independent hold		Swing		

Sha Tin District Board Election, 1991: Fo Tan
Party	Candidate	Votes	%	±%
Independent	Thomas Pang Cheung-wai	1,866	54.9	
United Democrats	Cheung Wing-fai	1,517	44.6	
Independent win (new seat)				

=== 1980s ===
Sha Tin District Board Election, 1982: Fo Tan
Party	Candidate	Votes	%	±%
Independent	Lam Hung-chiu	1,489	48.2	
Independent	Hung Yuk-fai	1,445	46.8	
Independent	Sit Hoi	1,178	38.1	
Independent	Wai Kwok-hung	661	21.3	
Independent win (new seat)				
