= Public housing estates in Fo Tan =

Public housing estates in Fo Tan, Hong Kong

The following is a list of public housing estates in Fo Tan, Hong Kong, including estates under the Home Ownership Scheme (HOS), Private Sector Participation Scheme (PSPS), Sandwich Class Housing Scheme (SCHS), Flat-for-Sale Scheme (FFSS), and Tenants Purchase Scheme (TPS) estates.

== Overview ==
Name		Type	Inaug.	No Blocks	No Units	Notes
Sui Wo Court	穗禾苑	HOS	1980	9	3,501	
Chun Yeung Estate	駿洋邨	Public	2020	5	4,846	
Yuk Wo Court	旭禾苑	HOS	2020	1	830	
Choi Wo Court	彩禾苑	HOS	2020	1	806	

=== Sui Wo Court ===
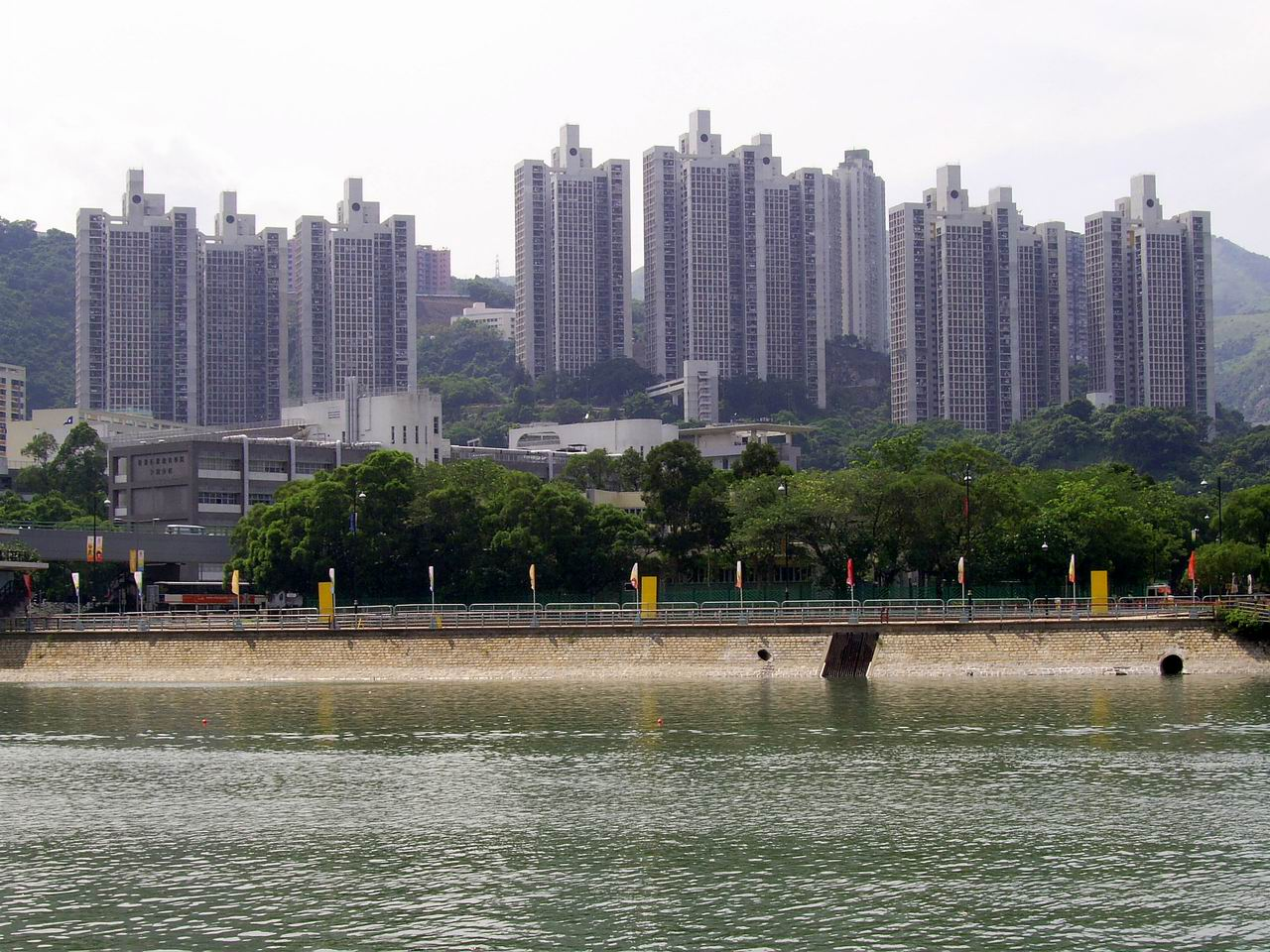
Sui Wo Court

Sui Wo Court (Chinese: 穗禾苑) is one of the first estates under HOS in Sha Tin, built in 1980. It is located on a mountain above Wo Che and east of Fo Tan in the northwest of Sha Tin. It received a Silver Medal at the 1981 Hong Kong Institute of Architects Annual Awards.

=== Chun Yeung Estate ===
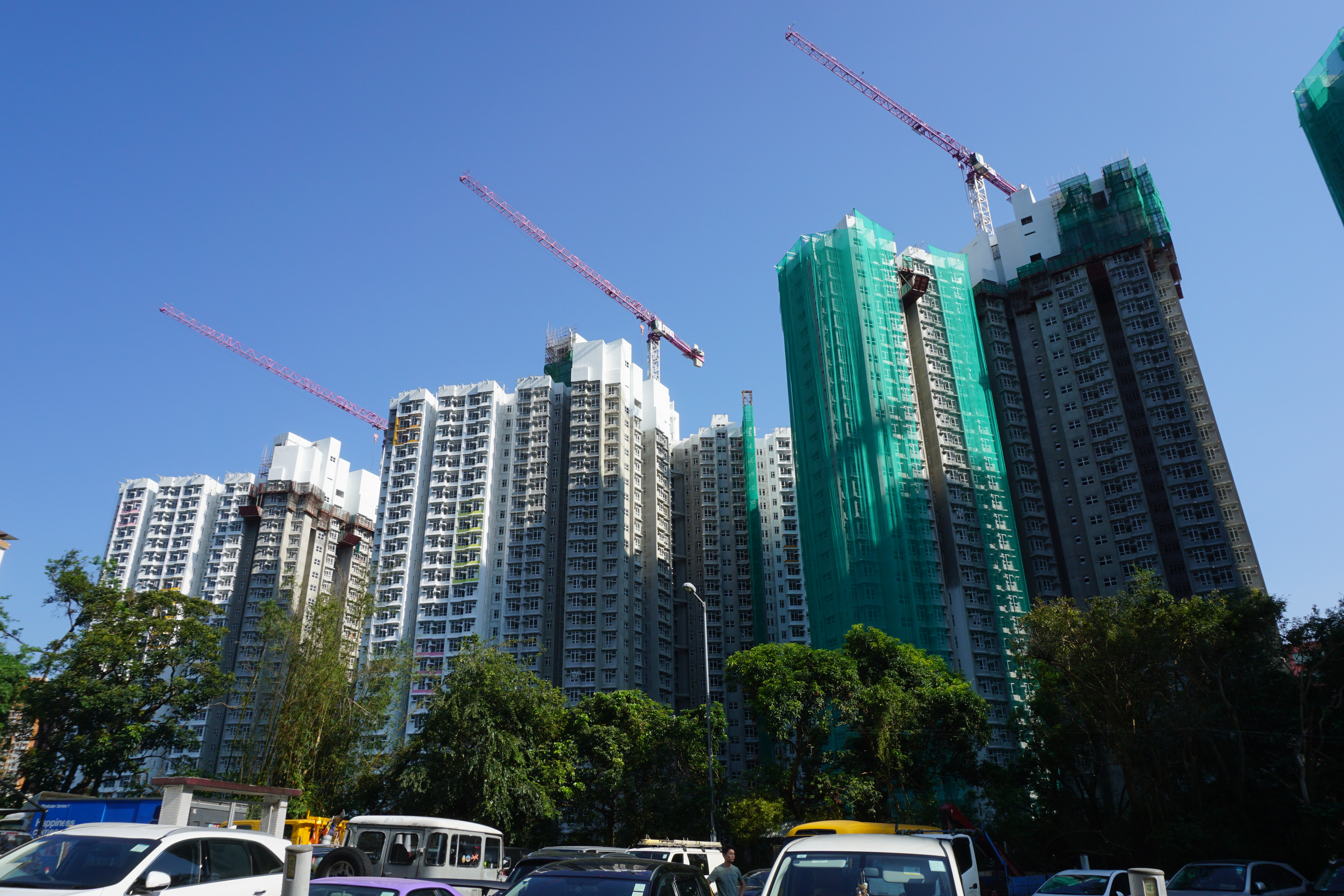
Chun Yeung Estate

Chun Yeung Estate (Chinese: 駿洋邨) is the only public housing estate in Fo Tan, located at the junction of Wong Chuk Yeung Street and Kwei Tei Street. It comprises 5 blocks and 1 shopping centre with totally 4,846 flats. Its name prefix "Chun" means "horse" in English since Sha Tin Racecourse is located in Fo Tan. It was completed in 2020.

The estate was planned as Green Form Subsidised Home Ownership Scheme to be sold to public housing tenants. However, concerns were raised that this may impinge on the quota for public rental housing and further lengthen waiting times. Finally, the plan was put aside and the estate was changed to public rental housing.

Name	Type	Completion
Chun Yat House	Non-standard	2020
Chun Yi House	Non-standard	2020
Chun San House	Non-standard	2020
Chun Sze House	Non-standard	2020
Chun Wu House	Non-standard	2020

=== Yuk Wo Court ===
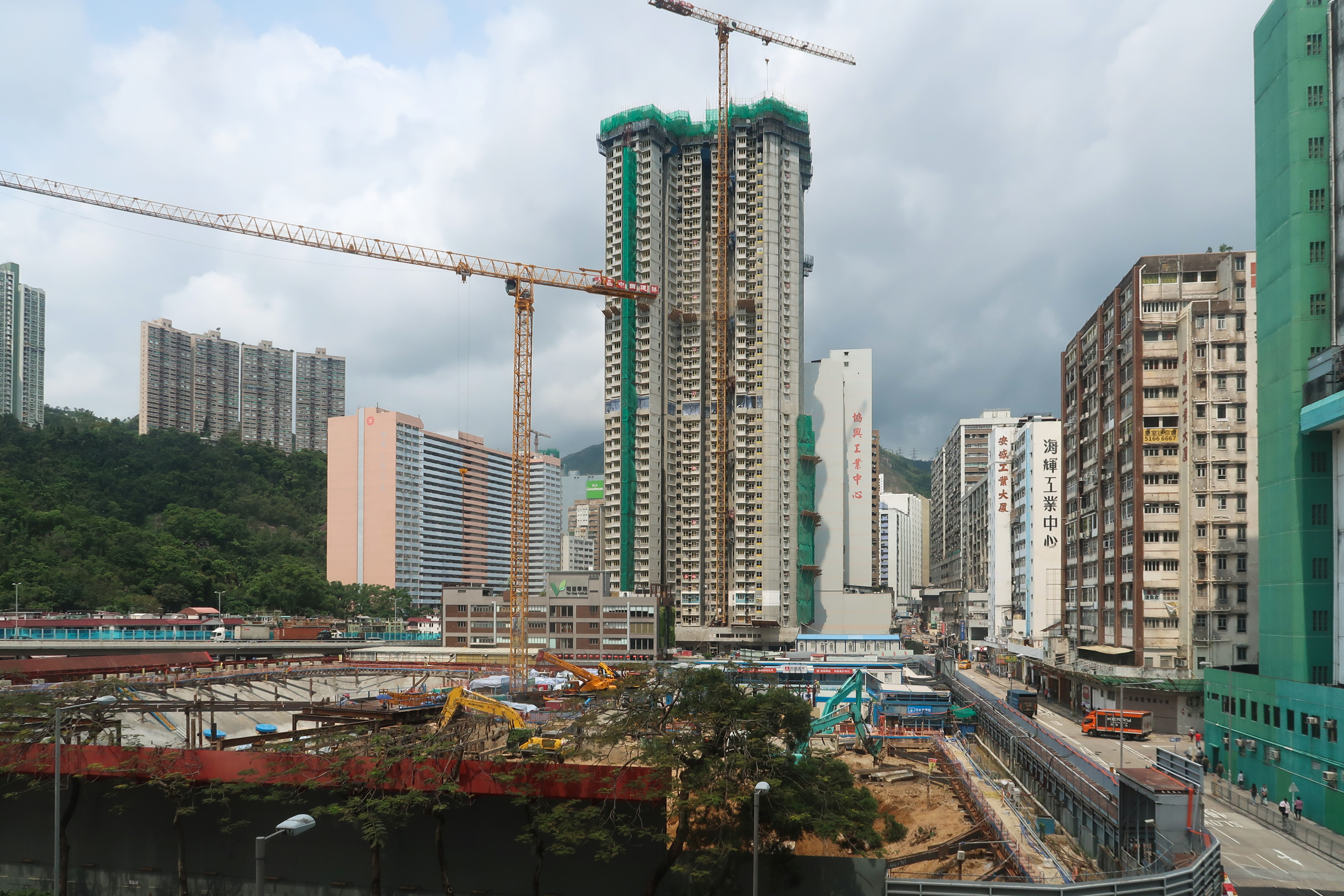
Yuk Wo Court

Yuk Wo Court (Chinese: 旭禾苑) is a Home Ownership Scheme court in Au Pui Wan Street, Fo Tan, near MTR Fo Tan station. It is one of the six HOS courts (others were Kwun Tak Court, Hoi Tak Court, Sheung Man Court, Yung Ming Court and Kam Fai Court) for sale in 2019. With a total site area of about 6,440 square metres, Yuk Wo Court comprises one 47-storey (the highest among the six HOS court) non-standard domestic block providing a total of 830 flats, with a saleable area of about 27.3 sq m to 43.0 sq m and a price range of about HK$1.73M to HK$3.36M. It was completed in 2020.

Name	Type	Completion
Yuk Wo Court	Non-standard	2020

=== Choi Wo Court ===
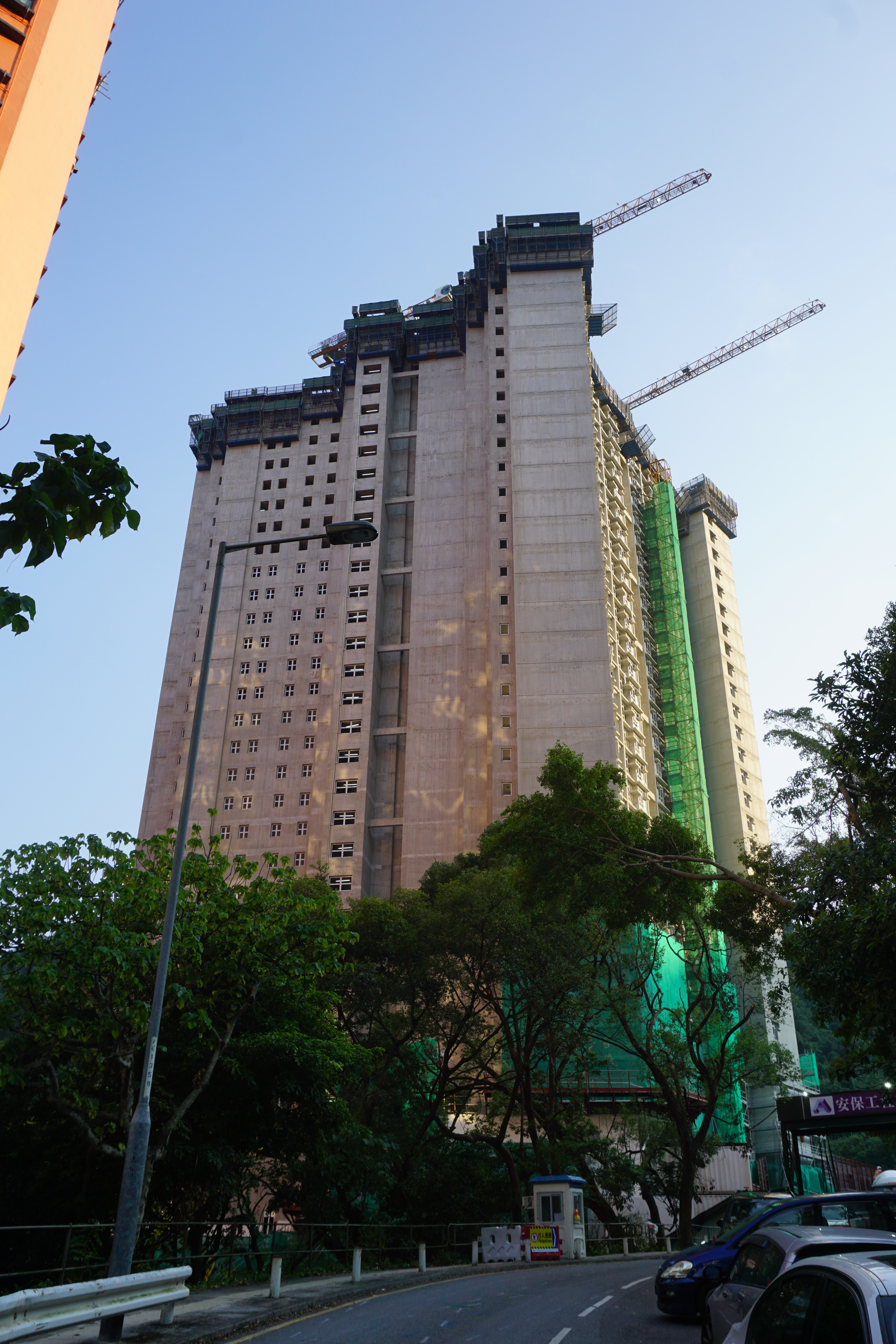
Choi Wo Court

Choi Wo Court (Chinese: 彩禾苑) is a Home Ownership Scheme court in Wo Sheung Tun Street, Fo Tan, near Fo Tan Industrial Area and Chun Yeung Estate. It was formerly the site of Citybus bus depot and comprises one block with 806 units in total. It was completed in 2020.

Name	Type	Completion
Choi Wo Court	Non-standard	2020
