= Sui Wo (constituency) =

Constituency of the Sha Tin District Council of Hong Kong

- Elected constituency for the Sha Tin District Council
- Boundary of Sui Wo in Sha Tin District
- District: Sha Tin
- Legislative Council constituency: New Territories North East
- Population: 12,870 (2019)
- Electorate: 9,063 (2019)

Current constituency
- Created: 1999
- Number of members: One
- Member: vacant

Sui Wo is one of the 41 constituencies in the Sha Tin District in Hong Kong.

The constituency returns one district councillor to the Sha Tin District Council, with an election every four years.

Sui Wo constituency is loosely based on Sui Wo Court, Chun Yeung Estate, Ville de Cascade, Greenwood Terrace and Fo Tan Village in Sha Tin with an estimated population of 12,870.

== Councillors represented ==
Election	Member	Party
1999	Thomas Pang Cheung-wai	DAB
2003	Thomas Pang Cheung-wai	DAB
2007	Thomas Pang Cheung-wai	DAB
2011	Thomas Pang Cheung-wai	DAB
2015	Thomas Pang Cheung-wai	DAB
2019	Ken Mak Tsz-kin→Vacant	Civic→Independent

== Election results ==
=== 2010s ===
Sha Tin District Council Election, 2019: Sui Wo
Party	Candidate	Votes	%	±%
Civic	Ken Mak Tsz-kin	4,054	58.47	+10.67
DAB	Chan Tan-tan	2,879	41.53	−10.47
Majority		1,175	16.94	
Turnout		6,963	76.83	
Civic gain from DAB		Swing		

Sha Tin District Council Election, 2015: Sui Wo
Party	Candidate	Votes	%	±%
DAB	Thomas Pang Cheung-wai	2,160	52.0	–12.0
Civic	Yau Chi-kin	1,984	47.8	+22.2
Nonpartisan	Lisa Li Sui-ha	101	2.4	–8.0
Majority		176	4.2	–34.2
Turnout		4,298	54.8	
DAB hold		Swing	–17.1	

Sha Tin District Council Election, 2011: Sui Wo
Party	Candidate	Votes	%	±%
DAB	Thomas Pang Cheung-wai	1,950	64.0	+4.2
Civic	Pang Yuk-ying	781	25.6	–9.8
Independent	Li Sui-ha	317	10.4	+5.5
Majority		1,169	38.4	+14.0
DAB hold		Swing	+7.0	

=== 2000s ===
Sha Tin District Council Election, 2007: Sui Wo
Party	Candidate	Votes	%	±%
DAB	Thomas Pang Cheung-wai	2,128	59.8	–1.9
Civic	Stephen Char Shik-ngor	1,259	35.4	
Frontier	Li Sui-ha	173	4.9	–33.8
Majority		869	24.4	+1.4
DAB hold		Swing		

Sha Tin District Council Election, 2003: Sui Wo
Party	Candidate	Votes	%	±%
DAB	Thomas Pang Cheung-wai	2,048	61.7	
Nonpartisan	Li Sui-ha	1,272	38.7	
Majority		776	23.0	
DAB hold		Swing		

=== 1990s ===
Sha Tin District Council Election, 1999: Sui Wo
Party	Candidate	Votes	%	±%
DAB	Thomas Pang Cheung-wai	Unopposed		
DAB win (new seat)				
