= Thomas Pang =

Hong Kong politician

Thomas Pang Cheung-wai SBS, JP
- 彭長緯
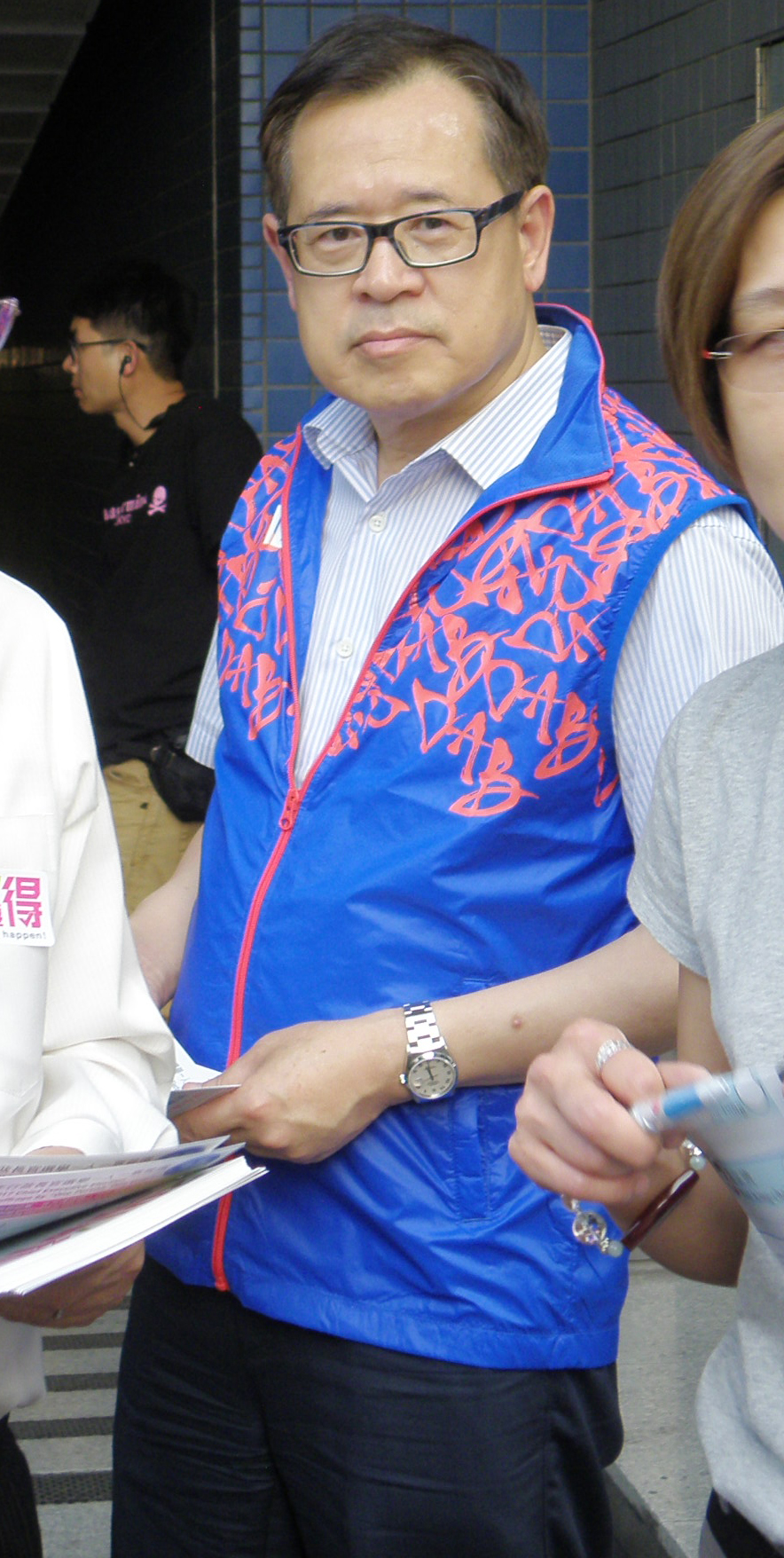

Vice-Chairman of the Democratic Alliance for the Betterment and Progress of Hong Kong
- Incumbent
- Assumed office 19 April 2013
- Chairman: Tam Yiu-chung; Starry Lee
- Preceded by: Lau Kong-wah

Member of the Chinese People's Political Consultative Conference
- Incumbent
- Assumed office February 2013
- Chairman: Yu Zhengsheng

Member of the Sha Tin District Council
- In office 1 January 2000 – 31 December 2019
- Preceded by: New constituency
- Succeeded by: Mak Tsz-kin
- Constituency: Sui Wo
- In office 1 April 1991 – 30 June 1997
- Succeeded by: Porinda Liu
- Constituency: Fo Tan

Member of the Regional Council
- In office 1 April 1995 – 30 June 1997
- Constituency: Sha Tin North

Personal details
- Born: 1954 (age 71–72)
- Party: Democratic Alliance for the Betterment and Progress of Hong Kong (DAB)
- Occupation: Politician

Thomas Pang Cheung-wai, SBS, JP (Chinese: 彭長緯, born 1954) is the current vice-chairman of the Democratic Alliance for the Betterment and Progress of Hong Kong (DAB), the largest pro-Beijing party in Hong Kong.

== Career ==
Pang has been serving in the Sha Tin District for many years. He was first elected to the Sha Tin District Board in the 1991 District Board elections in the Fo Tan constituency. He subsequently joined the Democratic Alliance for the Betterment of Hong Kong (DAB) and won a seat in the Regional Council in the 1995 municipal elections. After the establishment of the Special Administrative Region, he was the member of the Provisional Sha Tin District Board and Provisional Regional Council until the Regional Council was abolished in 1999. In 1998 Legislative Council elections, he failed to get a seat in the Election Committee constituency. In 2000 Legislative Council elections, he ran against Liberal Party's Miriam Lau in the Transport functional constituency but was defeated.

Since the 1999 District Council elections, he has been representing the Sui Wo constituency and is the vice-chairman of the Sha Tin District Council. Through the New Territories District Councils Subsector, he has been member of the Election Committee since 2000.

Pang has been the secretary general of the DAB. In 2013, he became the delegate to the National Committee of the Chinese People's Political Consultative Conference (CPPCC), China's top national consultative body. and also the vice-chairman of the DAB.

Pang has also been appointed to various public positions including member of the Appeal Board on Closure Orders (Immediate Health Hazard), Environmental Campaign Committee, Hospital Authority New Territories Regional Advisory Committee, Intangible Cultural Heritage Advisory Committee, Independent Police Complaints Council (IPCC) Observers, and Municipal Services Appeals Board.

He was made Justice of the Peace on 1 July 2003 and was awarded the Bronze Bauhinia Star in 2008.

Political offices
New constituency	Member of Sha Tin District Board; Representative for Fo Tan; 1991–1997	Council abolished
New constituency	Member of Sha Tin District Council; Representative for Sui Wo; 2000–2019	Succeeded by Mak Tsz-kin
New title	Vice-Chairman of Sha Tin District Council; 2000–2019	Incumbent
Party political offices
Preceded by Lau Kong-wah	Vice Chairman of Democratic Alliance for the Betterment and Progress of Hong Kong; 2013–present Served alongside: Ann Chiang, Starry Lee, Horace Cheung, Chan Yung	Incumbent
