= Evacuations by the Philippines related to the COVID-19 pandemic =

COVID-19 pandemic evacuations by the Philippines
- Location: Worldwide
- Theme: International and domestic evacuations
- Cause: COVID-19 pandemic
- Organised by: Philippine government
- Participants: Displaced Filipinos
- Outcome: 1,375,686 Overseas Filipinos repatriated. (as of August 24, 2021); 257,492 Overseas Filipino Workers stranded domestically evacuated to their home provinces (as of October 20, 2020)

Throughout the COVID-19 pandemic, the national and local governments of the Philippines have coordinated numerous international and domestic evacuations.

== Repatriations ==
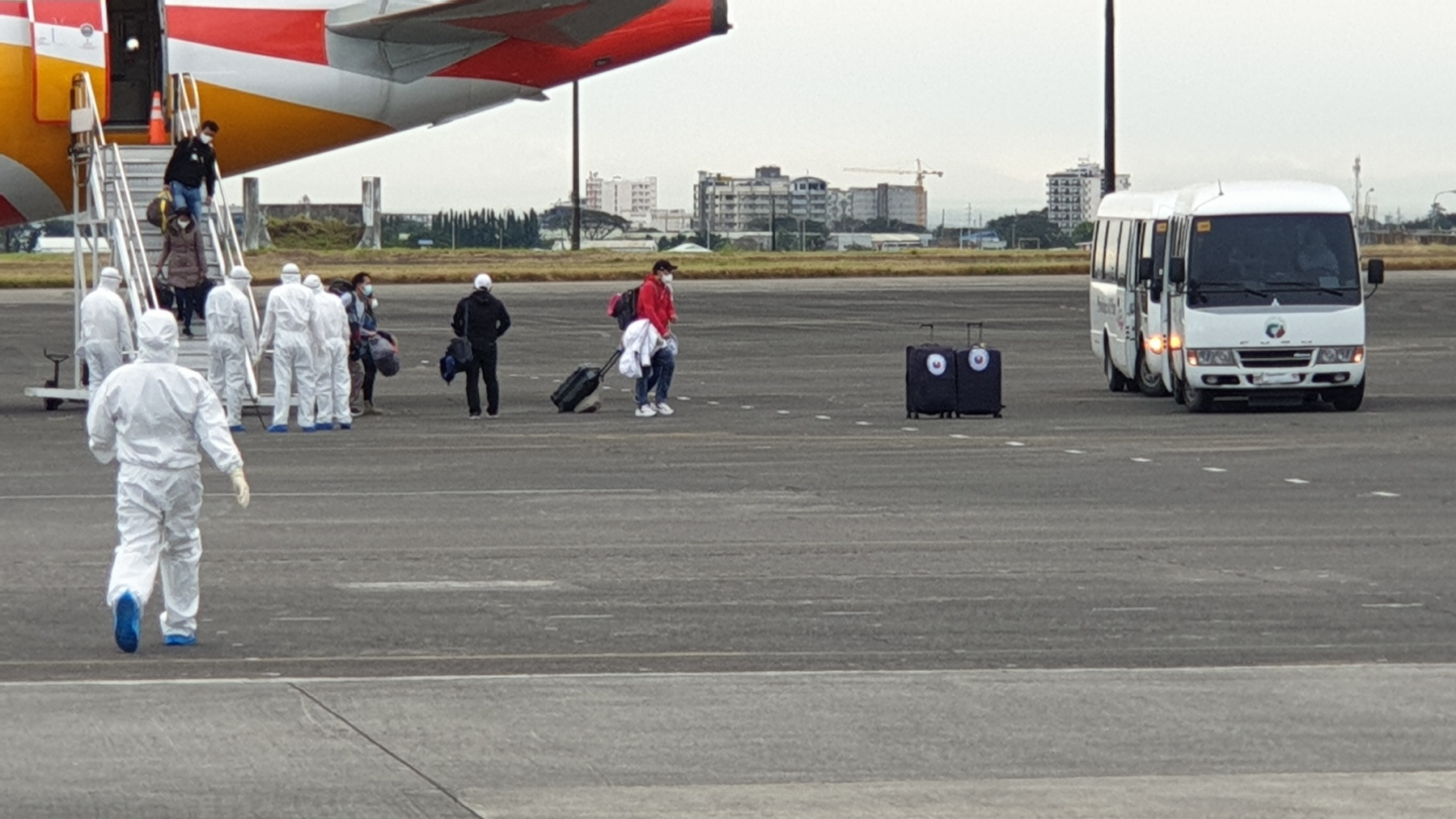
Repatriated Filipinos disembark their plane at Clark Air Base, Pampanga on February 9, 2020

=== Background ===
As early as February 2020, the Philippine government has taken measures to evacuate its citizens during the COVID-19 pandemic. This includes the repatriation of overseas Filipinos from various countries and international conveyances affected by the pandemic and domestic evacuation of locally stranded individuals, which were conducted by the national and local governments.

The Philippine government has repatriated its citizens from various COVID-19 affected countries and international conveyances. By August 24, 2021, more than 1.38 million overseas Filipinos have been evacuated since its first repatriation in the first quarter of 2020. According to the DFA, COVID-19 pandemic–related repatriations have become the largest evacuation effort conducted by the country since the 1991 Gulf War in the Middle East, where approximately 20,000 to 30,000 individuals had been evacuated.

=== Initial evacuations ===
The first of such efforts by the government involved repatriating Filipino nationals in Hubei, China. The government began the repatriation process on January 18, 2020. Upon arrival in the Philippines, individuals underwent mandatory quarantine for 14 days. The Athlete's Village at the New Clark City Sports Hub which also has a clinic run by the Philippine General Hospital was chosen as the quarantine site for repatriated Filipinos and New Clark City was locked down on February 6, 2020, in preparation for the arrival of the repatriates.

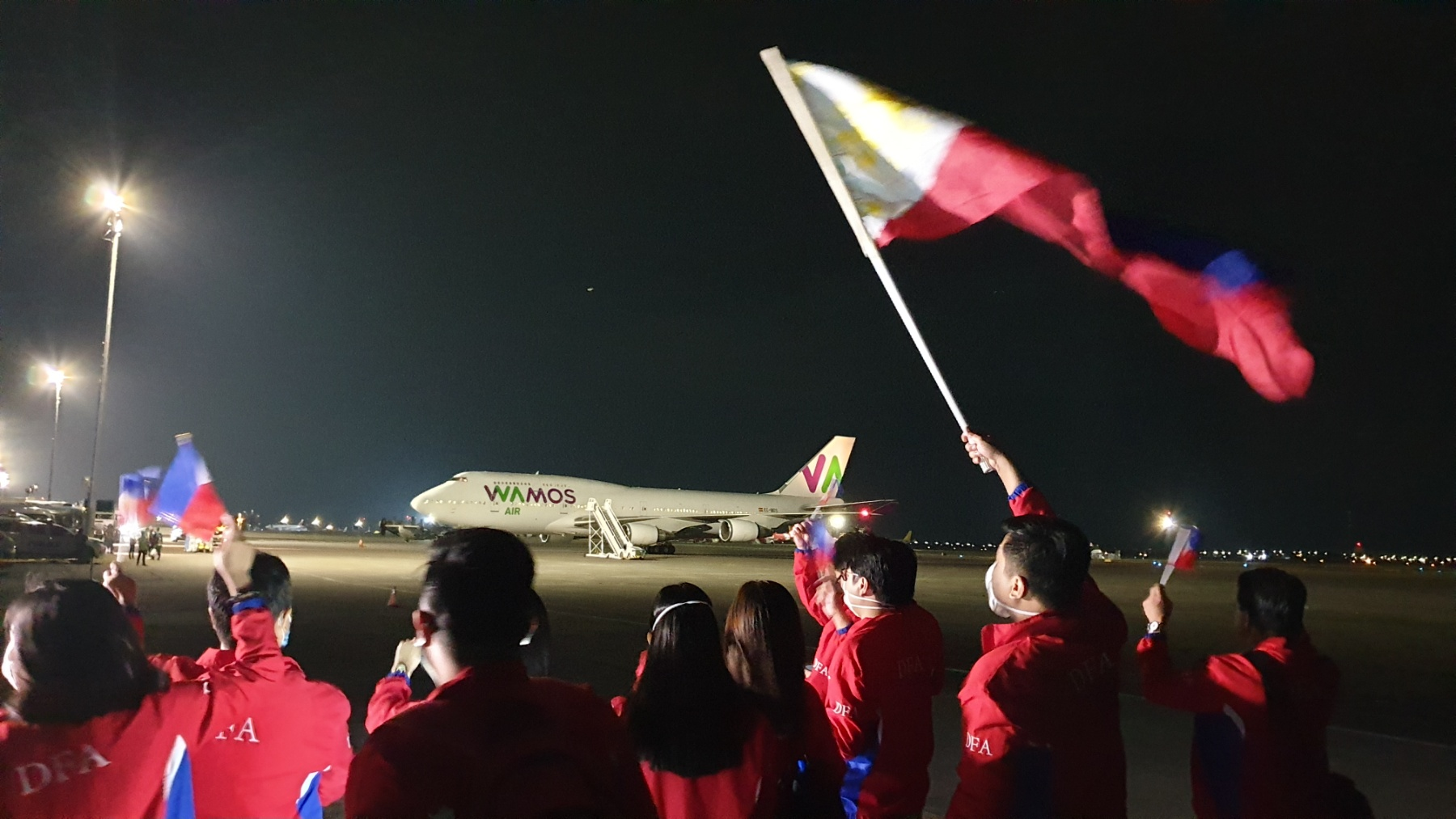
Officials of the Department of Foreign Affairs greets repatriates from M/V Grand Princess at Clark International Airport on March 16, 2020

Likewise, the Philippine government has repatriated Filipino seafarers, and to a lesser extent Filipino tourists, on board cruise ships in various countries and territories. The first of such effort was the repatriation of Filipino crew members and tourists on board the Diamond Princess in February 2020 which was quarantined off the coast of Yokohama due to confirmed COVID-19 infection. 445 Filipinos were quarantined in New Clark City. Filipino nationals on board cruise ships docked in seaports in other countries such as the United States and Italy were also repatriated.

After completing a 14-day quarantine period, repatriated seafarers will be given aid by the Overseas Workers Welfare Administration (OWWA). Each will receive ₱10,000 from the OWWA and ₱20,000 livelihood grant will be made available to Filipino seafarers who opted to stay permanently in the Philippines.

== Domestic evacuations ==
The Hatid Tulong program (formerly Hatid Probinsya) was established by the COVID-19 National Task Force, the Department of Transportation and other government agencies to facilitate the transport of repatriated Overseas Filipino Workers back to their home localities. Another separate program of the national government is Balik Probinsya, which intends to encourage the migration of Metro Manila residents back to their home localities outside the metropolis for long-term settlement. Balik Probinsya program was suspended on June 11, 2020, to prioritize stranded individuals.

== See also ==
- Evacuations related to the COVID-19 pandemic
- Philippine government response to the COVID-19 pandemic
- Overseas Filipinos during the COVID-19 pandemic
