= Fo Tan Village =

Village in Hong Kong

Coordinates: 22.395052°N 114.195872°E

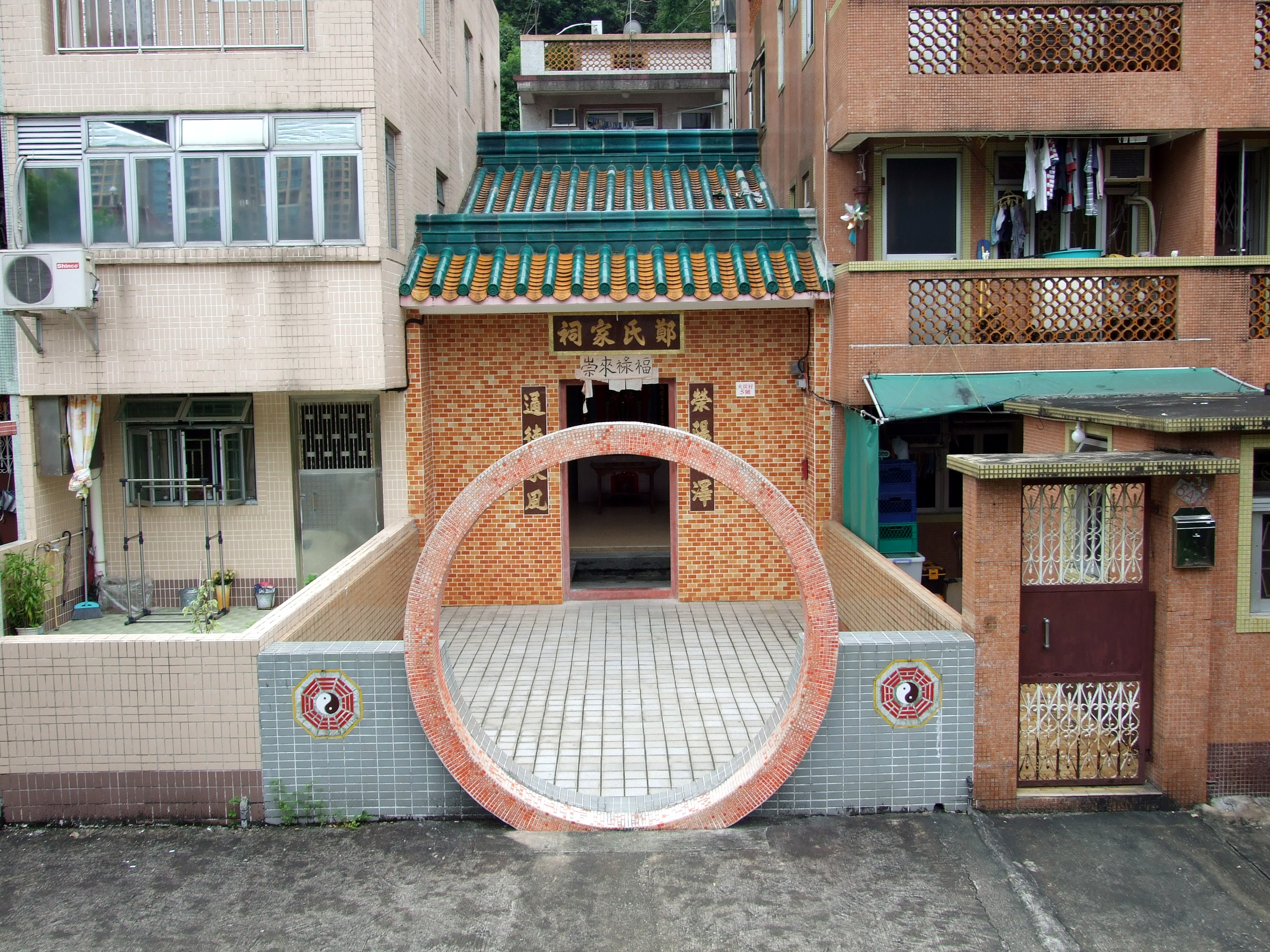
Cheng Ancestral Hall in Fo Tan Village.

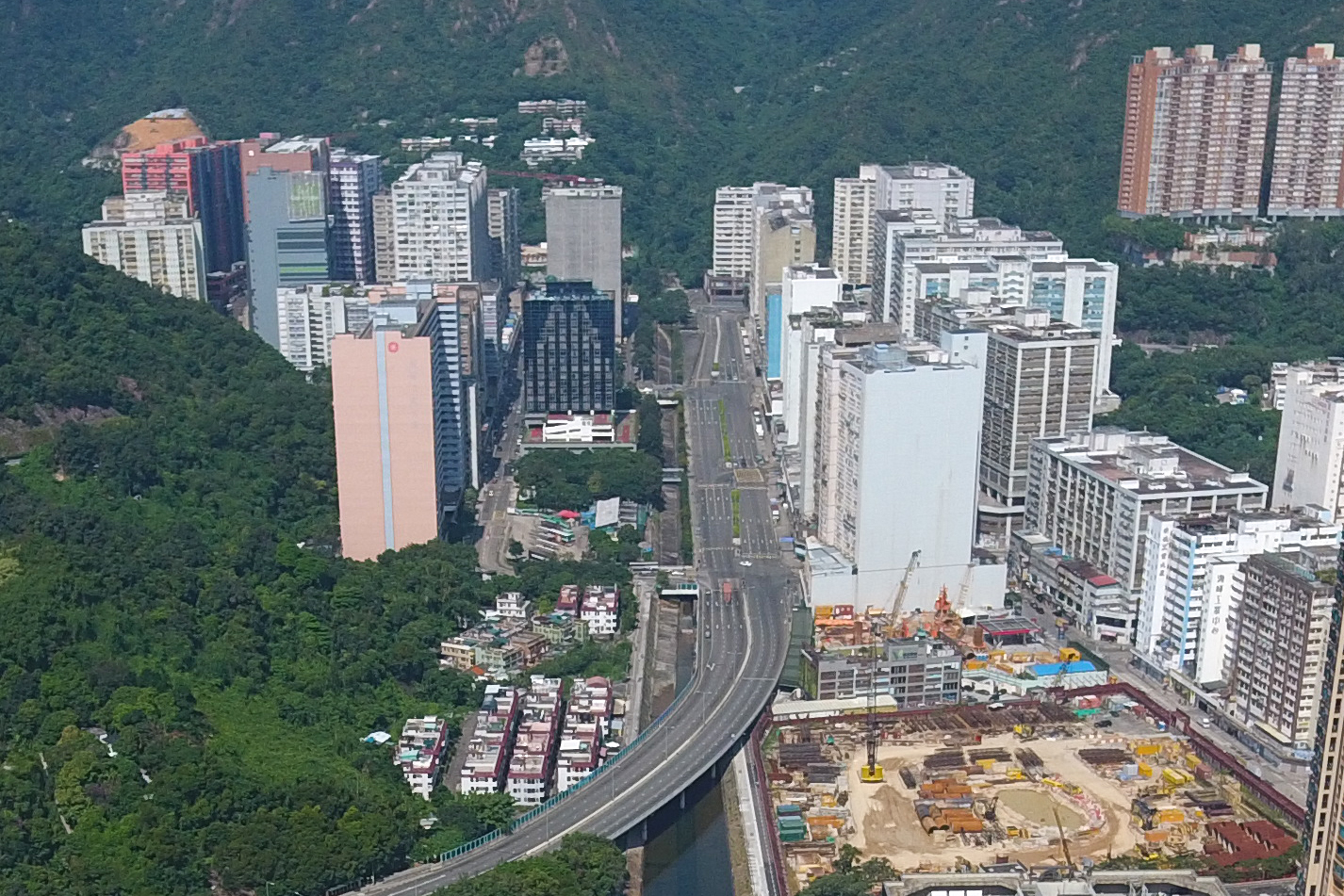
Fo Tan Village (bottom left) within Fo Tan area. The road in the centre is Fo Tan Road.

Fo Tan Village (Chinese: 火炭村) is a village in the Fo Tan area of Sha Tin District in Hong Kong.

== Administration ==
Fo Tan Village a recognized village under the New Territories Small House Policy.

== See also ==
- Kau Yeuk (Sha Tin)
- Sui Wo (constituency)
