= Chun Yeung Estate =

Public housing estate in Fo Tan, Hong Kong

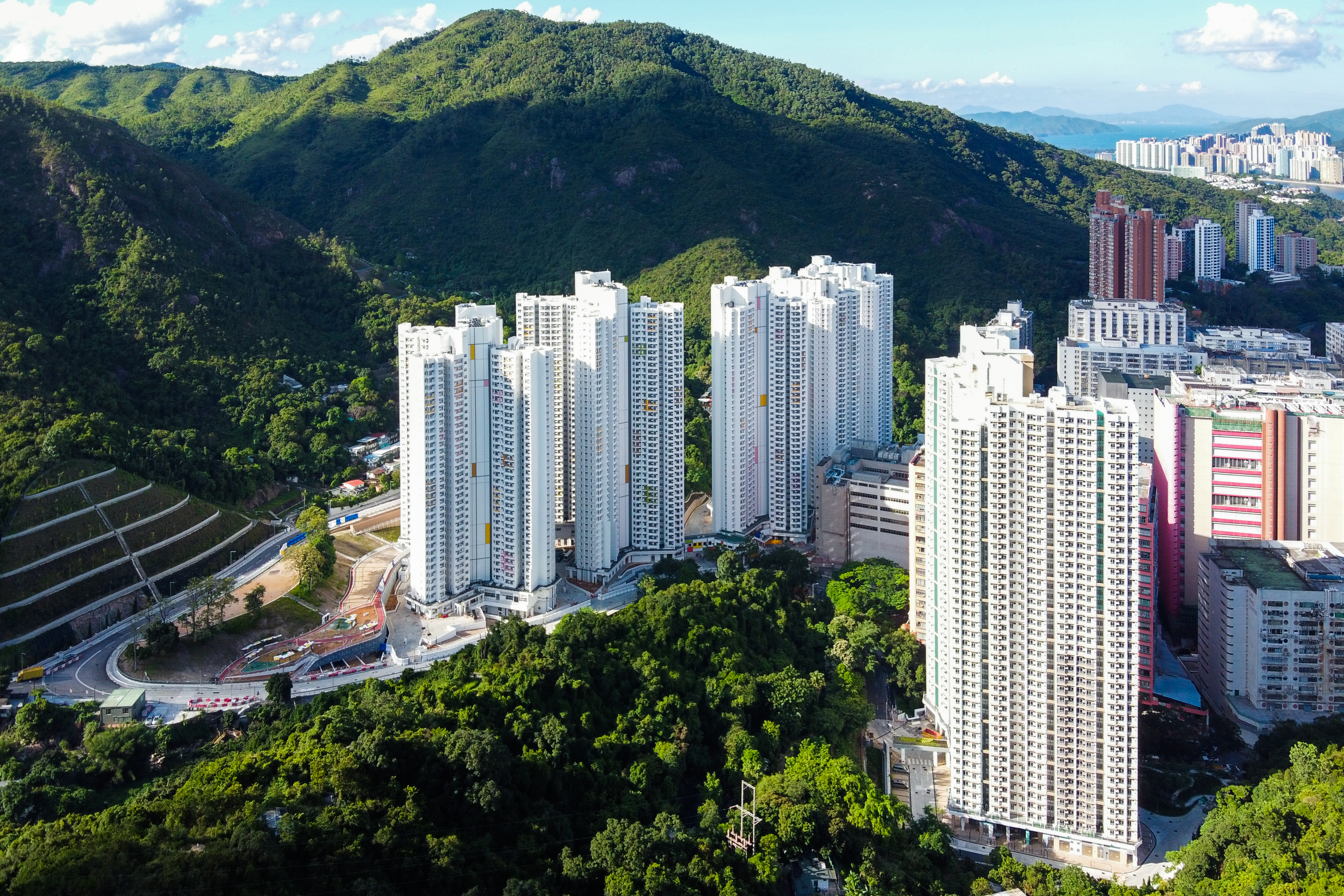
- Chun Yeung Estate
- Interactive map of Chun Yeung Estate

General information
- Location: 28 Wong Chuk Yeung Street, Fo Tan; New Territories, Hong Kong
- Coordinates: 22.399398°N 114.189054°E
- Status: Completed
- Category: Public rental housing
- Population: 8,400 (2020)
- No. of blocks: 5
- No. of units: 4,846

Construction
- Constructed: 2020; 6 years ago
- Authority: Hong Kong Housing Authority

Chun Yeung Estate
- Traditional Chinese: 駿洋邨
Transcriptions
Yue: Cantonese
- Yale Romanization: jeun yèuhng chyūn
- Jyutping: zeon3 joeng4 cyun1

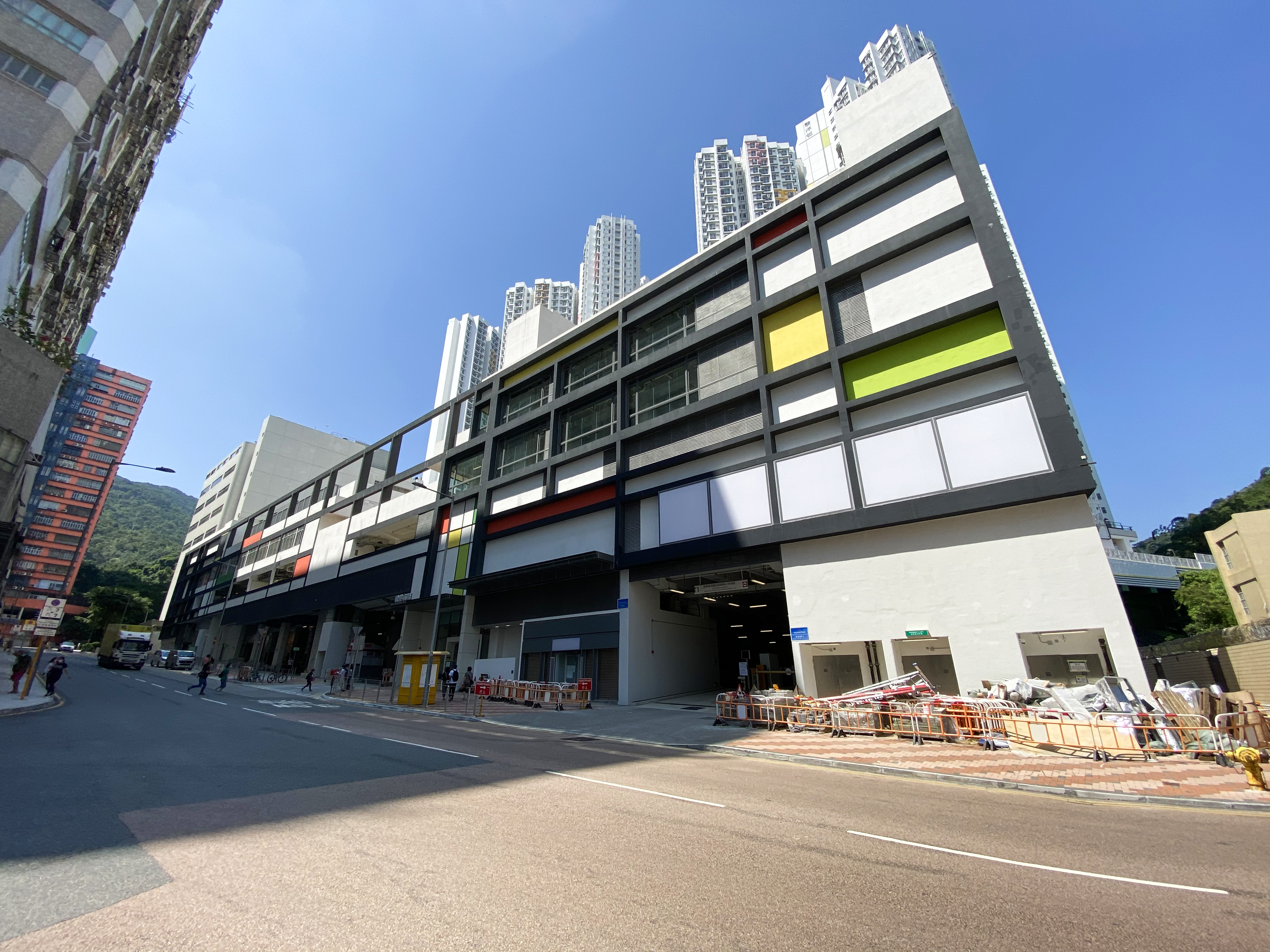
Chun Yeung Shopping Centre

Chun Yeung Estate (Chinese: 駿洋邨) is a public housing estate in Fo Tan, New Territories, Hong Kong. It is the only public housing estate in Fo Tan, located at the junction of Wong Chuk Yeung Street and Kwei Tei Street. It comprises 5 blocks and 1 shopping centre with total of 4,846 flats. Its name prefix "Chun" means "horse" in English since Sha Tin Racecourse is located in Fo Tan. It was completed in 2020.

The estate was planned as Green Form Subsidised Home Ownership Scheme to be sold to public housing tenants. However, concerns were raised that this may impinge on the quota for public rental housing and further lengthen waiting times. Finally, the plan was put aside and the estate was changed to public rental housing.

== History ==
The estate was jointly designed by the Chief Architect of the Housing Department (3), Wong Kwok-hing and Dennis Lau & Ng Chun Man Architects & Engineers, and was contracted by Sun Fook Kong Group. In response to the local environment, the designer referred to the grid style of artist Piet Mondrian and incorporated it into the housing design. There are five blocks in the estate, providing a total of 4846 units, which would be completed in February 2020.

The housing estate was formerly known as the Citybus Fo Tan depot and the Fo Tan Cottage Area. The latter was demolished in 2000 and all residents had moved to Chung On Estate, Ma On Shan. Since then, the land in the cottage area had been used as a temporary parking lot and government waste car park for a long time. It was not until 2010 that it was rezoned with the bus depot land for the construction of public housing.

With the government's announcement of the regularization of the Green Form Subsidised Home Ownership Scheme in 2018, Chun Yeung Estate, which was still unnamed at the time, was listed as a housing estate for sale in the second phase of the scheme. Due to the large number of units in the housing estate, the above proposal was rejected by the Hong Kong Housing Authority and cancelled on the grounds of affecting the supply of public housing. Finally, it was replaced by the first phase of Lai Tsui Court in Cheung Sha Wan.

On the eve of the occupation, due to the global spread of COVID-19, and the existing isolation camps are insufficient for applications, the government stated on 7 February 2020 that it needs to requisition this estate unit for isolation facilities. As the pandemic was once brought under control, the estate was originally scheduled to be returned in July 2020 but due to the rebound of the pandemic during the same period, only the fourth and fifth blocks can be returned as scheduled, while the return date of the other three blocks had been postponed to December that year twice.

As of 28 August 2020, blocks 4 and 5 after the occupation began disinfection and maintenance while the units in the other three blocks were originally expected to be postponed to the second quarter of 2021. However, under pressure from parties, coupled with the stabilization of the pandemic, it would be returned as early as October 2020 and was expected to be occupied in January of the following year. On 24 September 2020, as the last close contact had completed the quarantine, the Chun Yeung Estate Quarantine Center was officially suspended and returned in mid-October of the same year. All subsequent renovation work was completed on 10 December 2020, and then ready to be delivered to prospective tenants as the government had originally expected one to three prospective residents not to be occupied until the end of January 2021. However, it was reported that the prospective residents of Block 3 can move in as early as 10 December, and it was estimated that 80 households will be arranged every day. Even if there were multiple holidays in December, the relevant work would not be suspended.

== Houses ==
Name	Chinese name	Block no.	Building type	Completed
Chun Yat House	駿逸樓	1	Non-standard block	2020
Chun Yi House	駿爾樓	2	Non-standard block	2020
Chun San House	駿山樓	3	Non-standard block (Y-shaped)	2020
Chun Sze House	駿時樓	4	Non-standard block	2020
Chun Wu House	駿湖樓	5	Non-standard block	2020

== Politics ==
Chun Yeung Estate is located in Sui Wo constituency of the Sha Tin District Council. It is currently represented by Ken Mak Tsz-kin, who was elected in the 2019 elections.

== Features ==
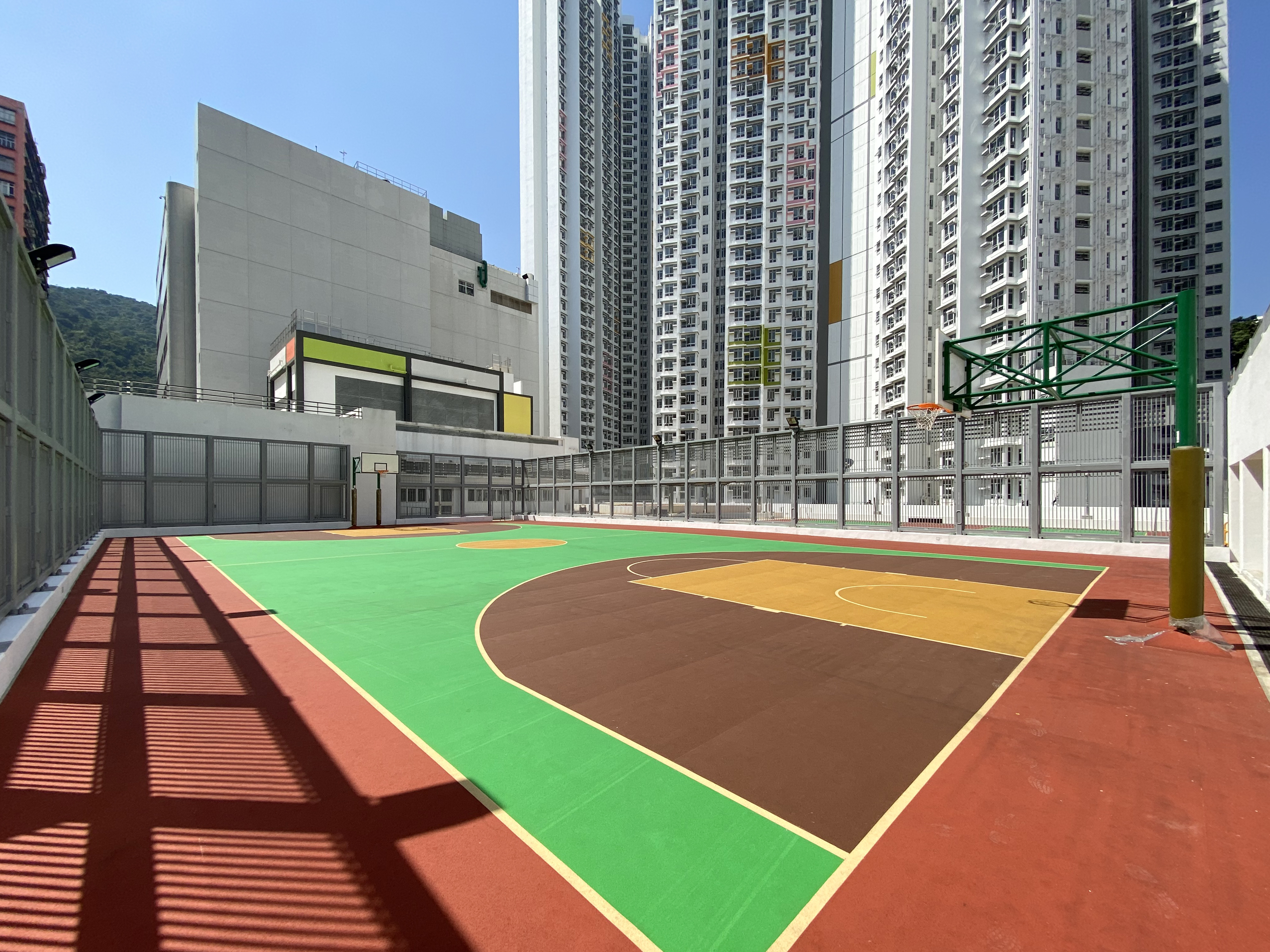
Basketball court

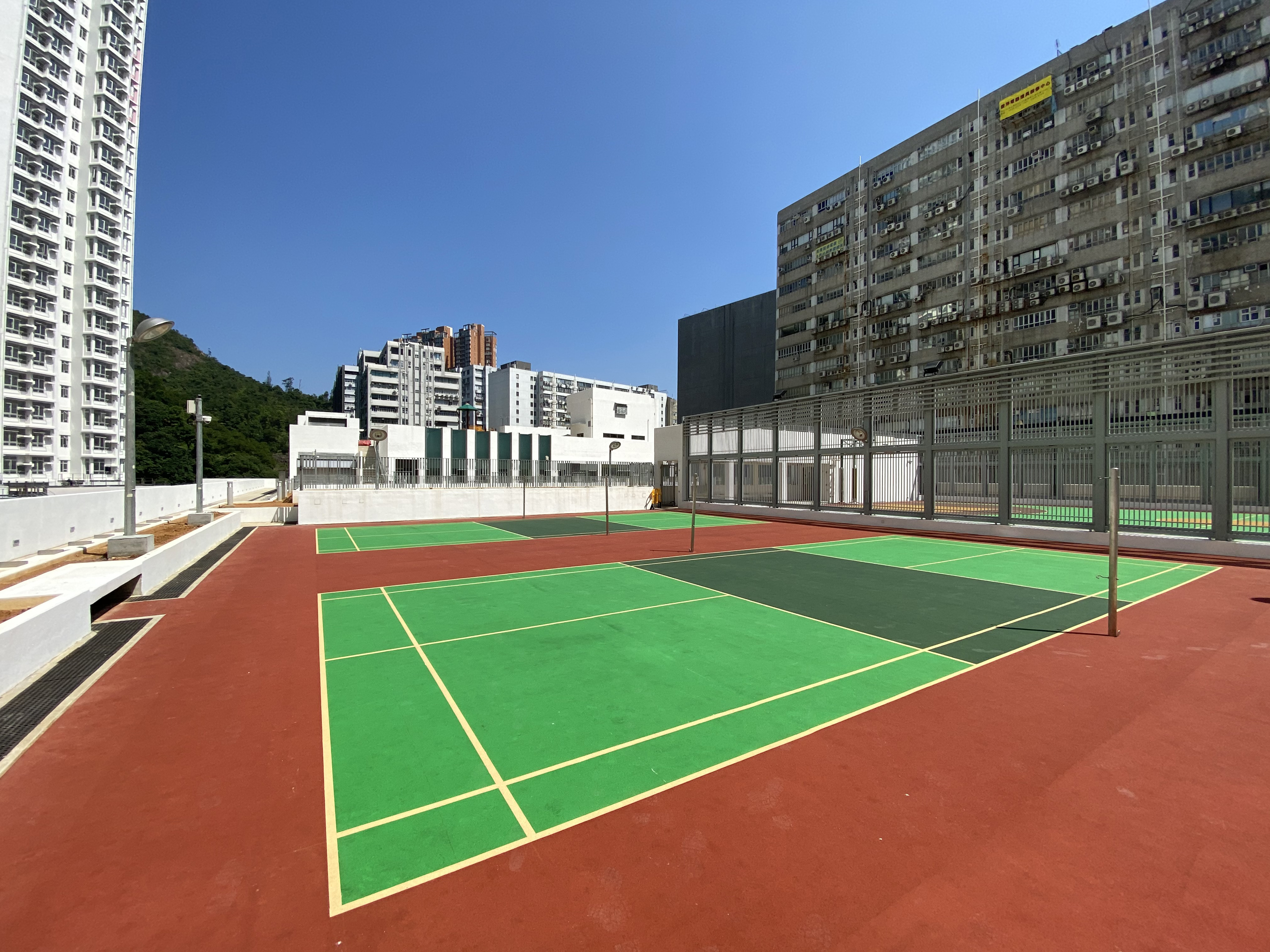
Badminton court

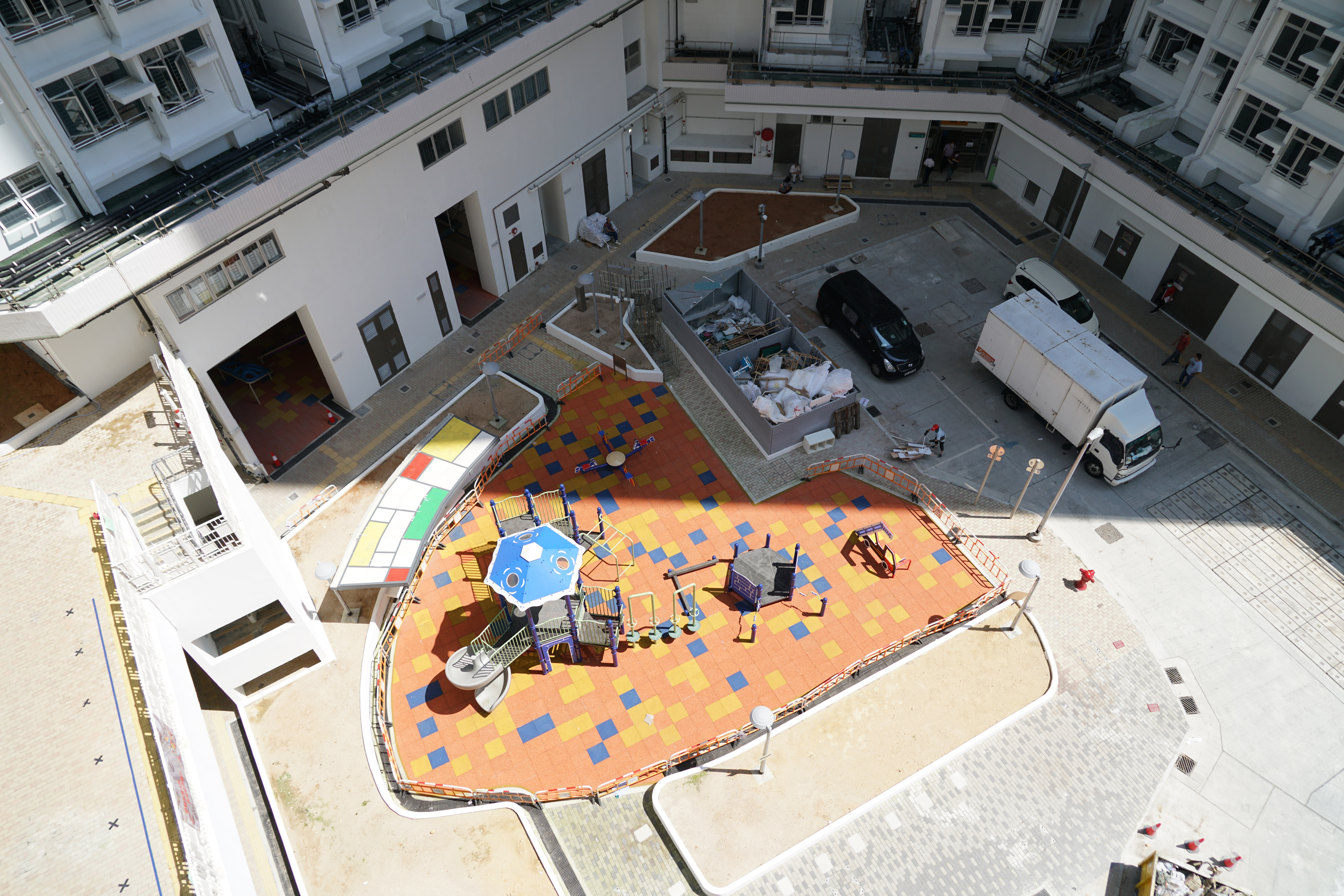
Community playground

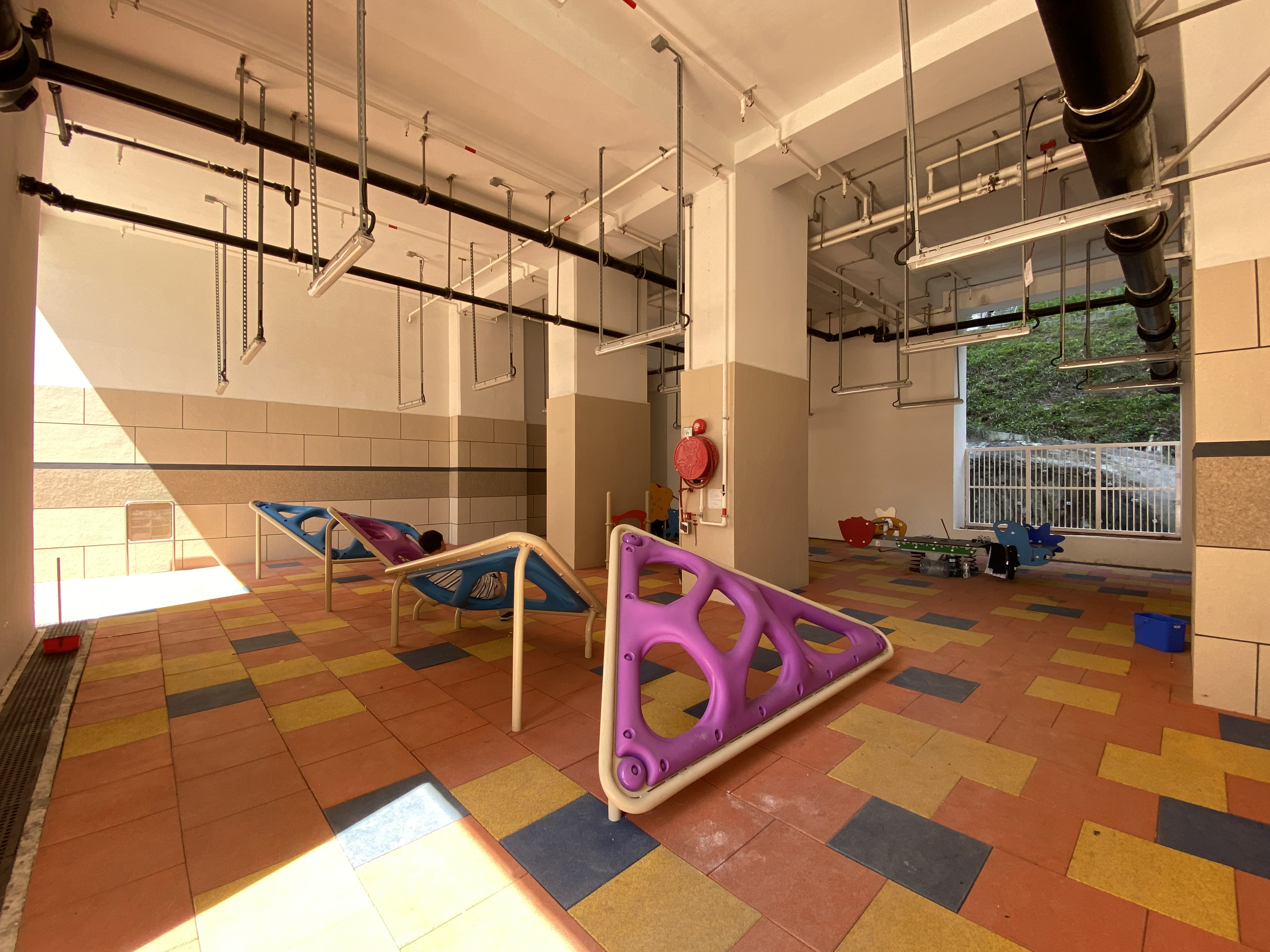
Indoor children's playground in Chun Sze House

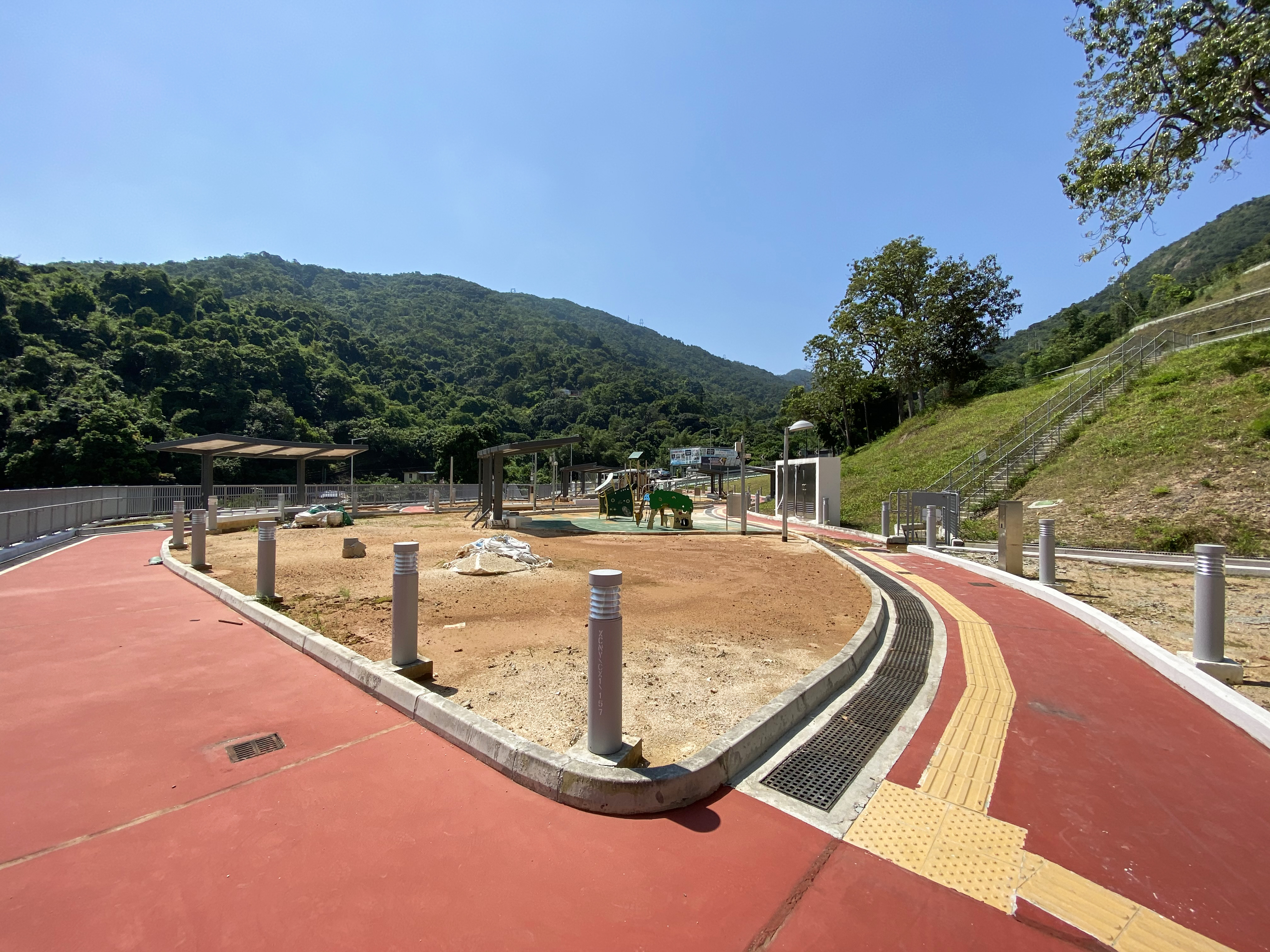
Children's playground near Wong Chuk Yeung Street

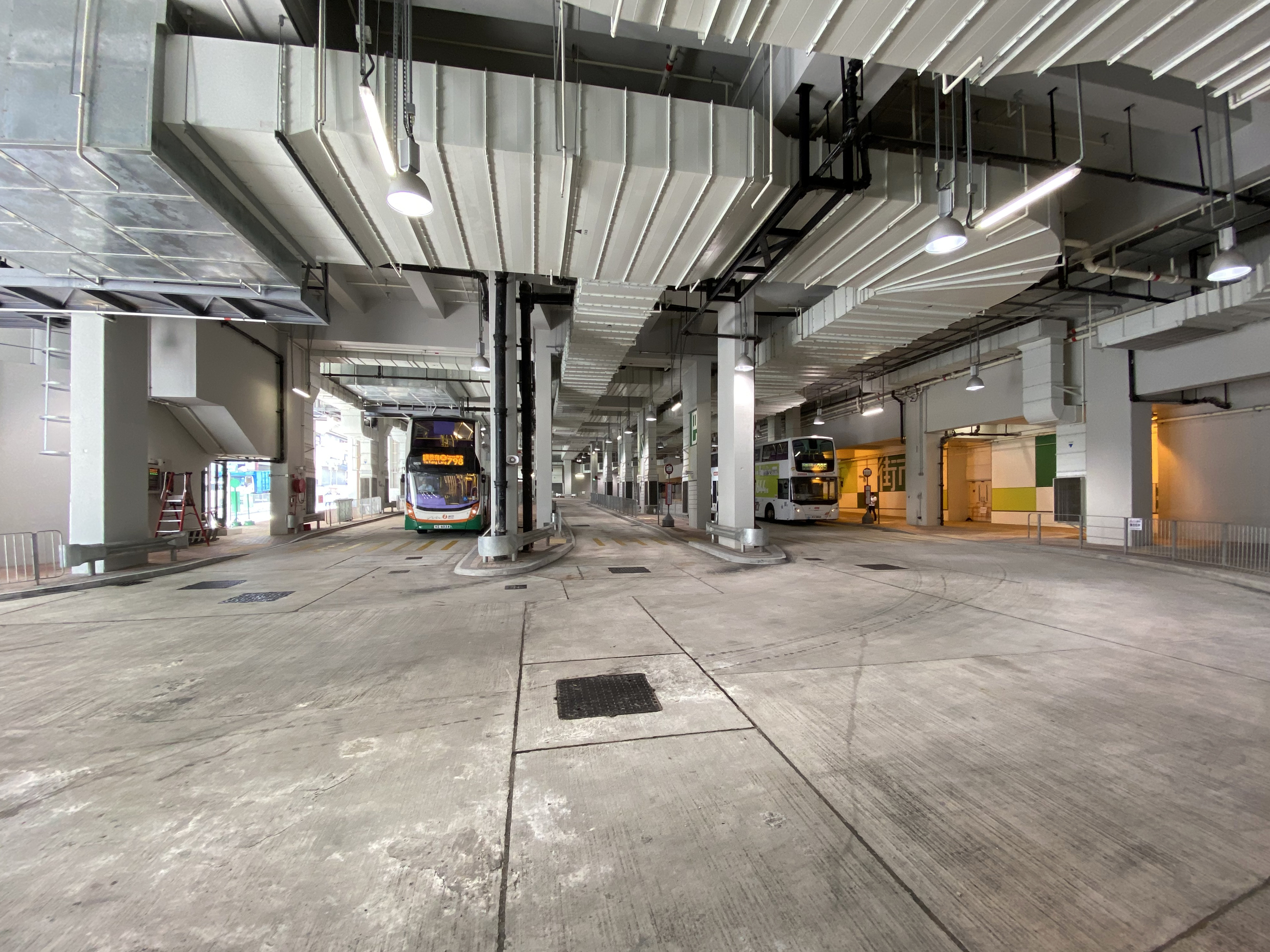
Fo Tan Chun Yeung Estate Public Transport Lay-bys

== See also ==
- Public housing estates in Fo Tan
